= List of reptiles of Florida =

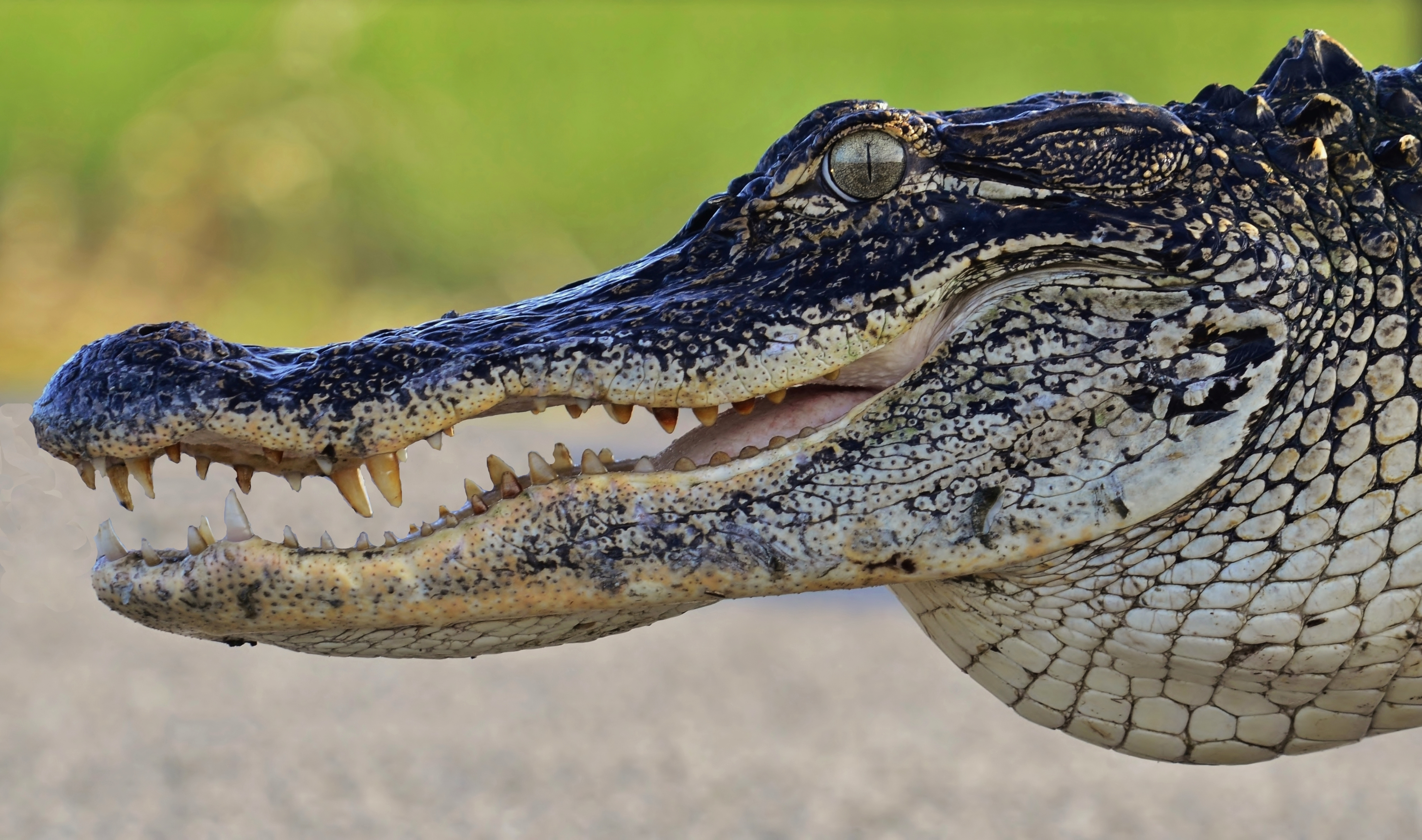
The American alligator is the state reptile of Florida.

This is a list of reptiles which are found in the U.S. state of Florida. This list includes both native and introduced species. Introduced species are put on this list only if they have an established population (large breeding population, numerous specimens caught, invasive, etc.). Three out of the four orders of reptiles can be found in Florida, with the order Rhynchocephalia (tuataras) being absent. Though many sources have different amounts (due to introduced species), this lists 118 species, which is about right.

== Testudines ==
This order includes all the freshwater and sea turtles, as well as the land tortoises. Overall, 26 species can be found. Florida has many turtles, but only one species of tortoise.

=== Emydids ===
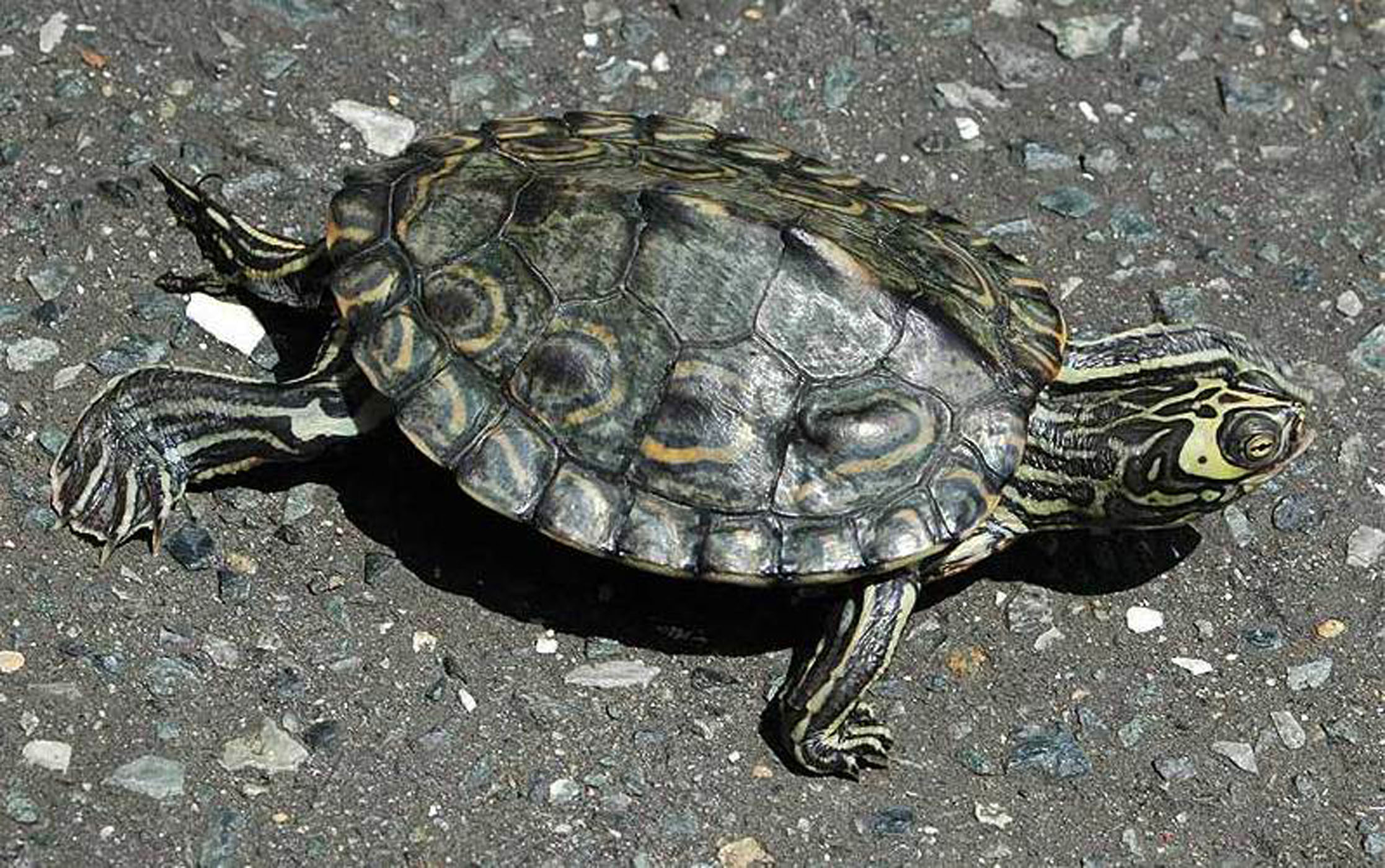
- Barbour's map turtle (Graptemys barbouri)
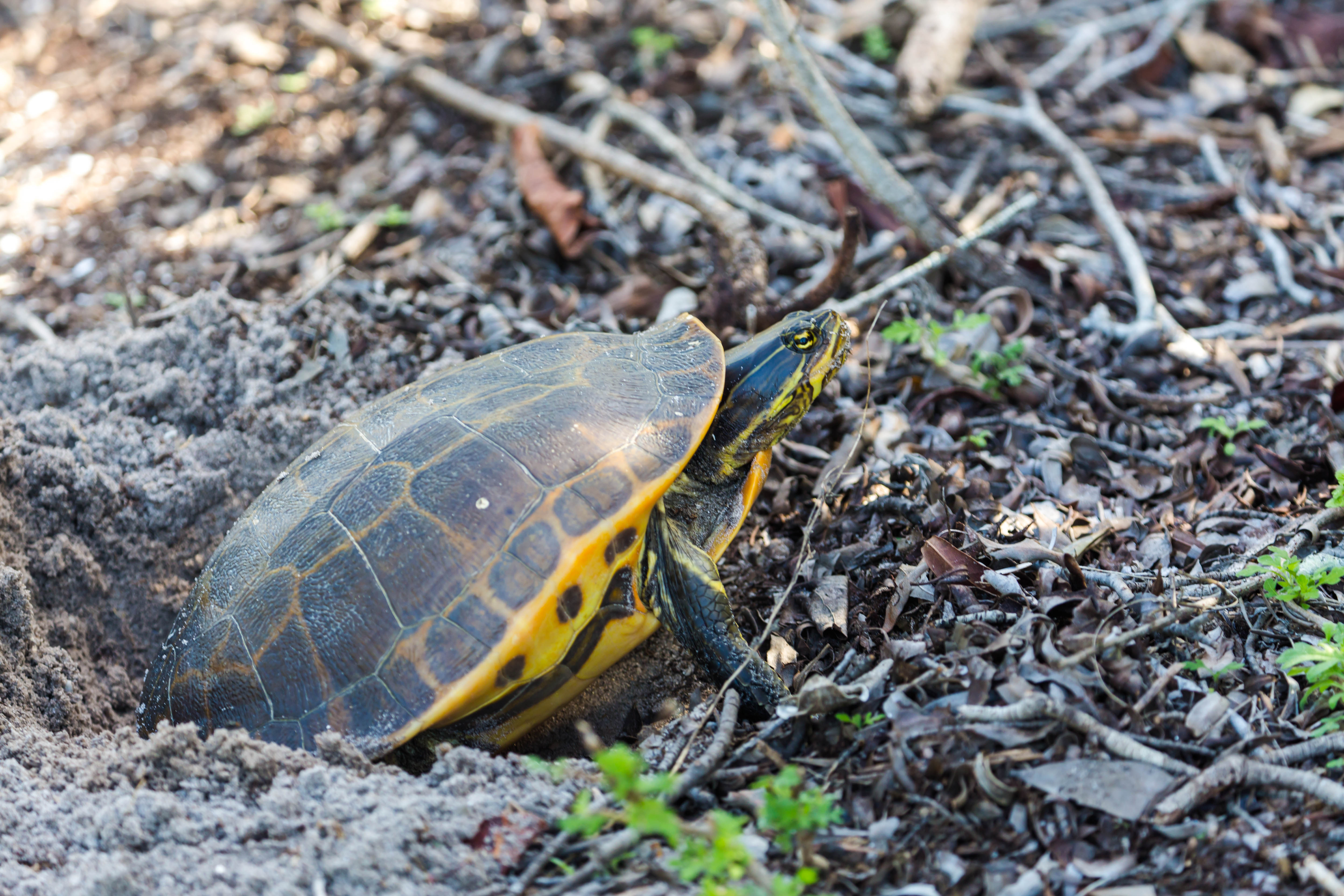
- Chicken turtle (Deirochelys reticularia)
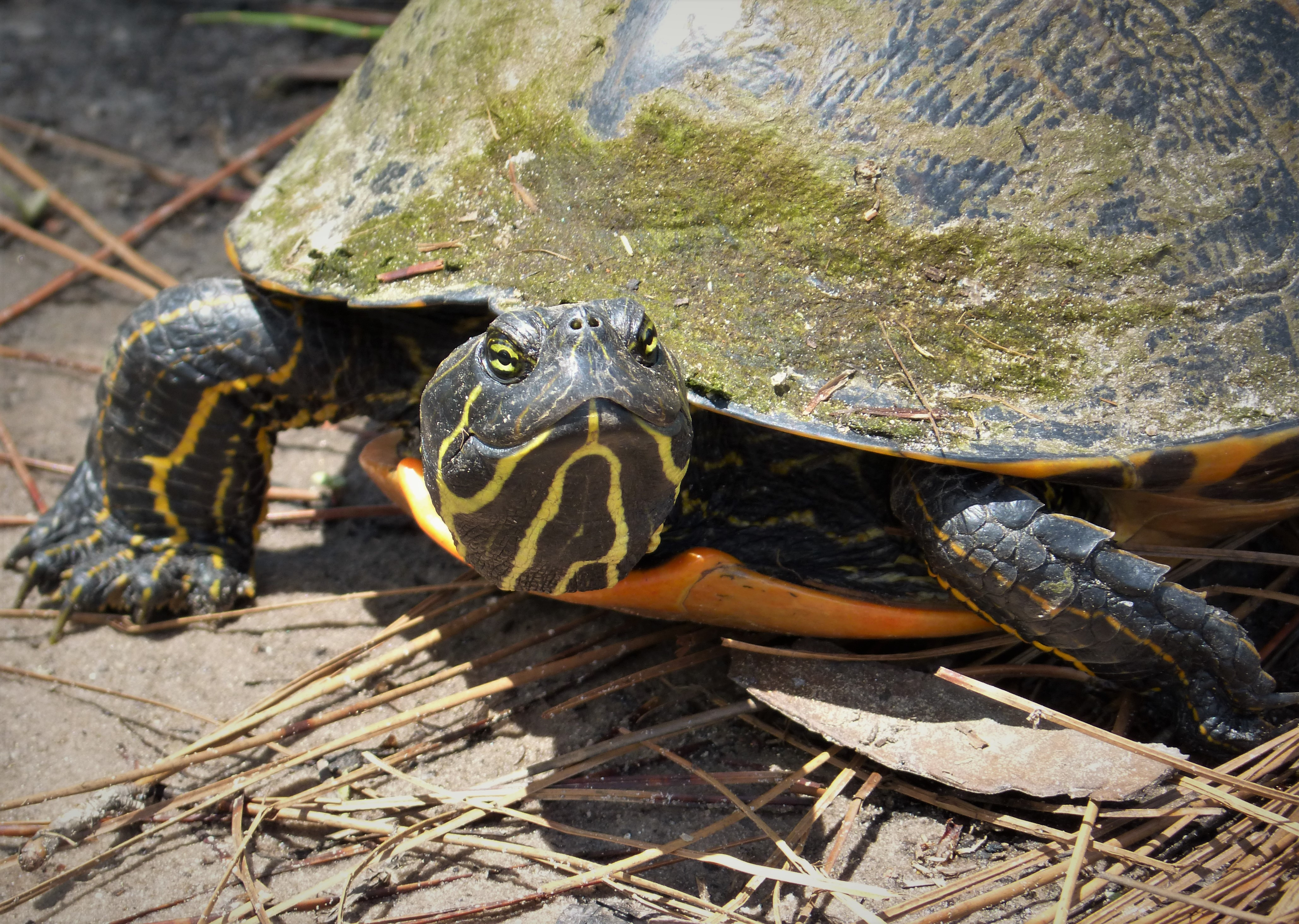
- Coastal plain cooter (Pseudemys floridana)
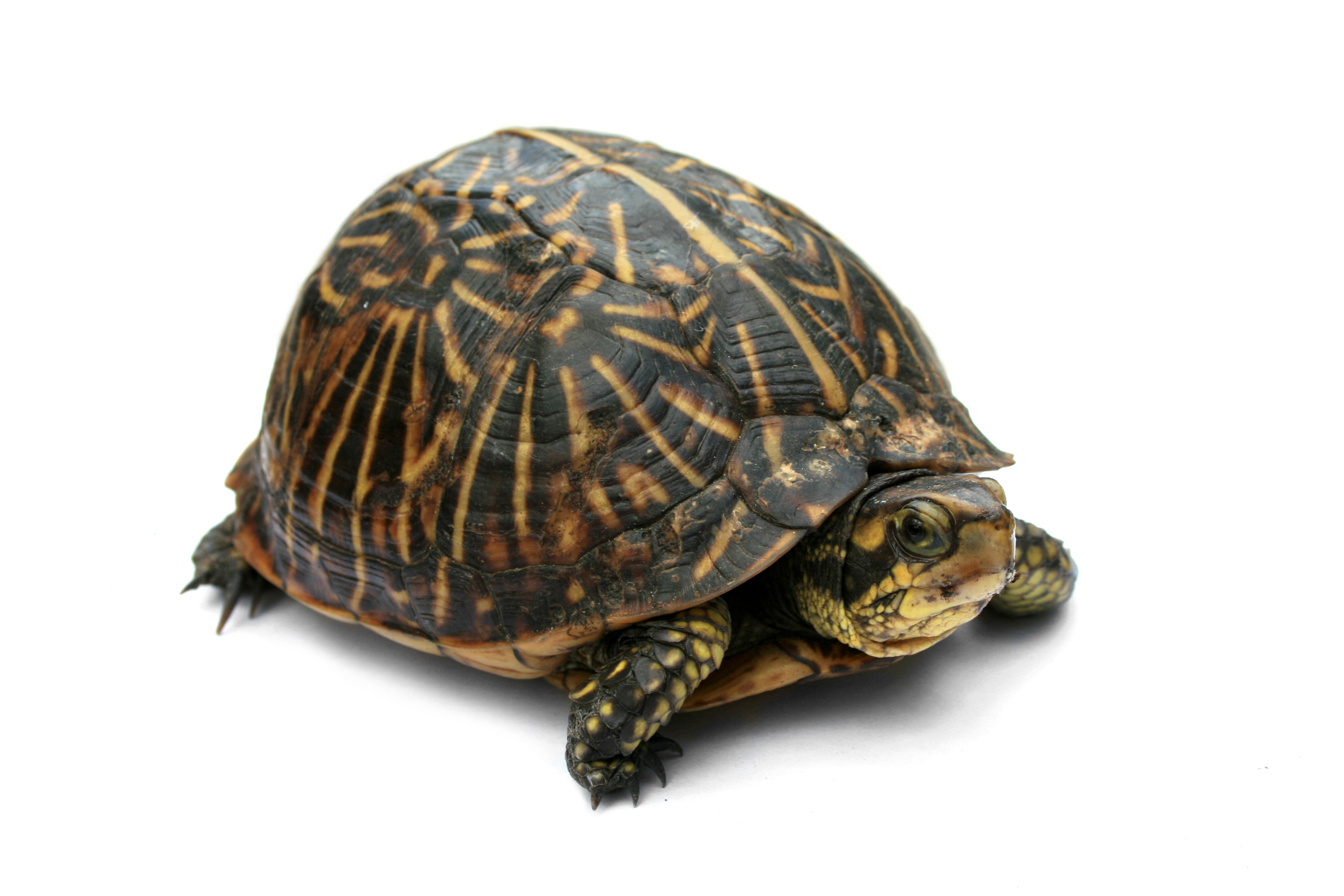
- Common box turtle (Terrapene carolina)
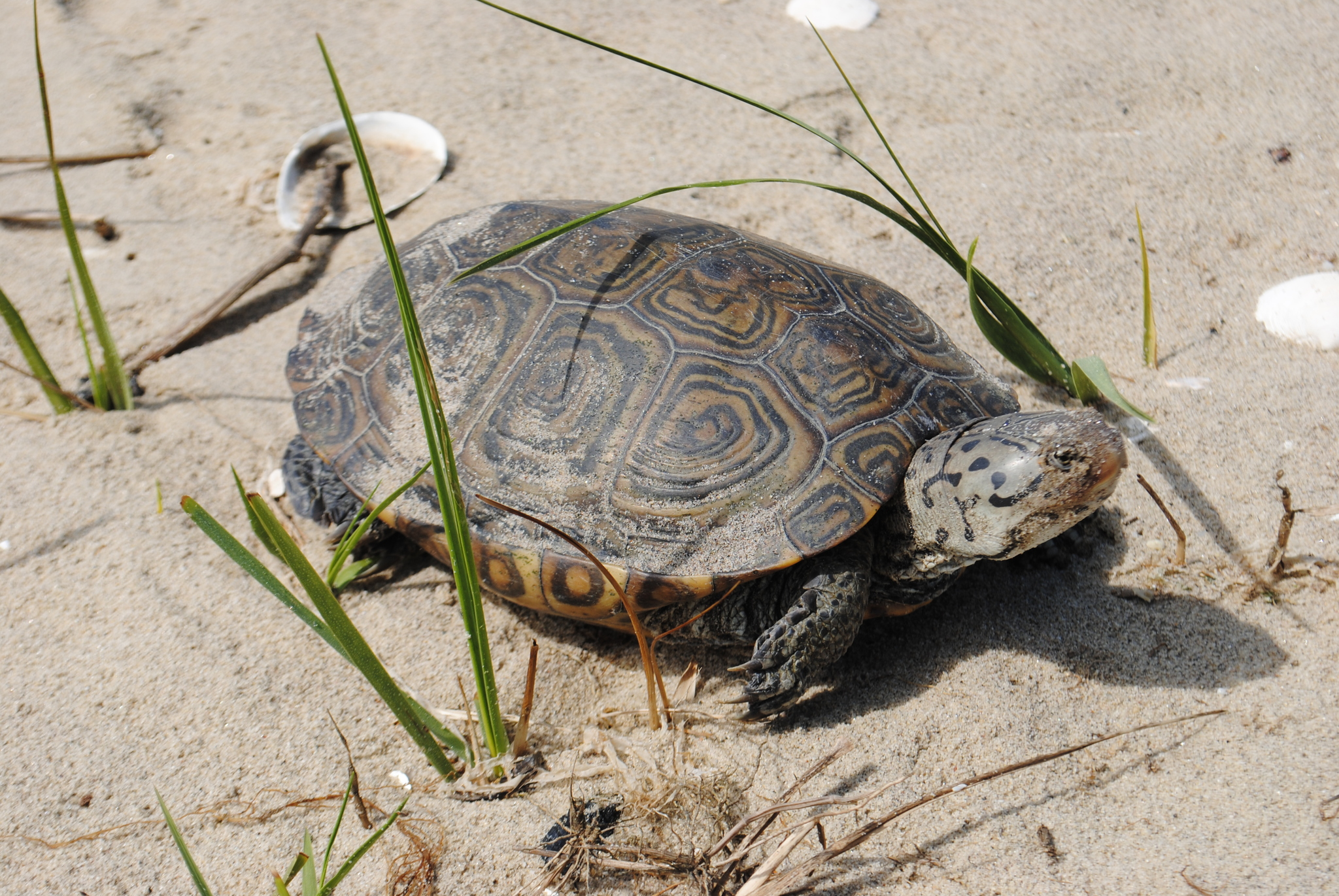
- Diamondback terrapin (Malaclemys terrapin)
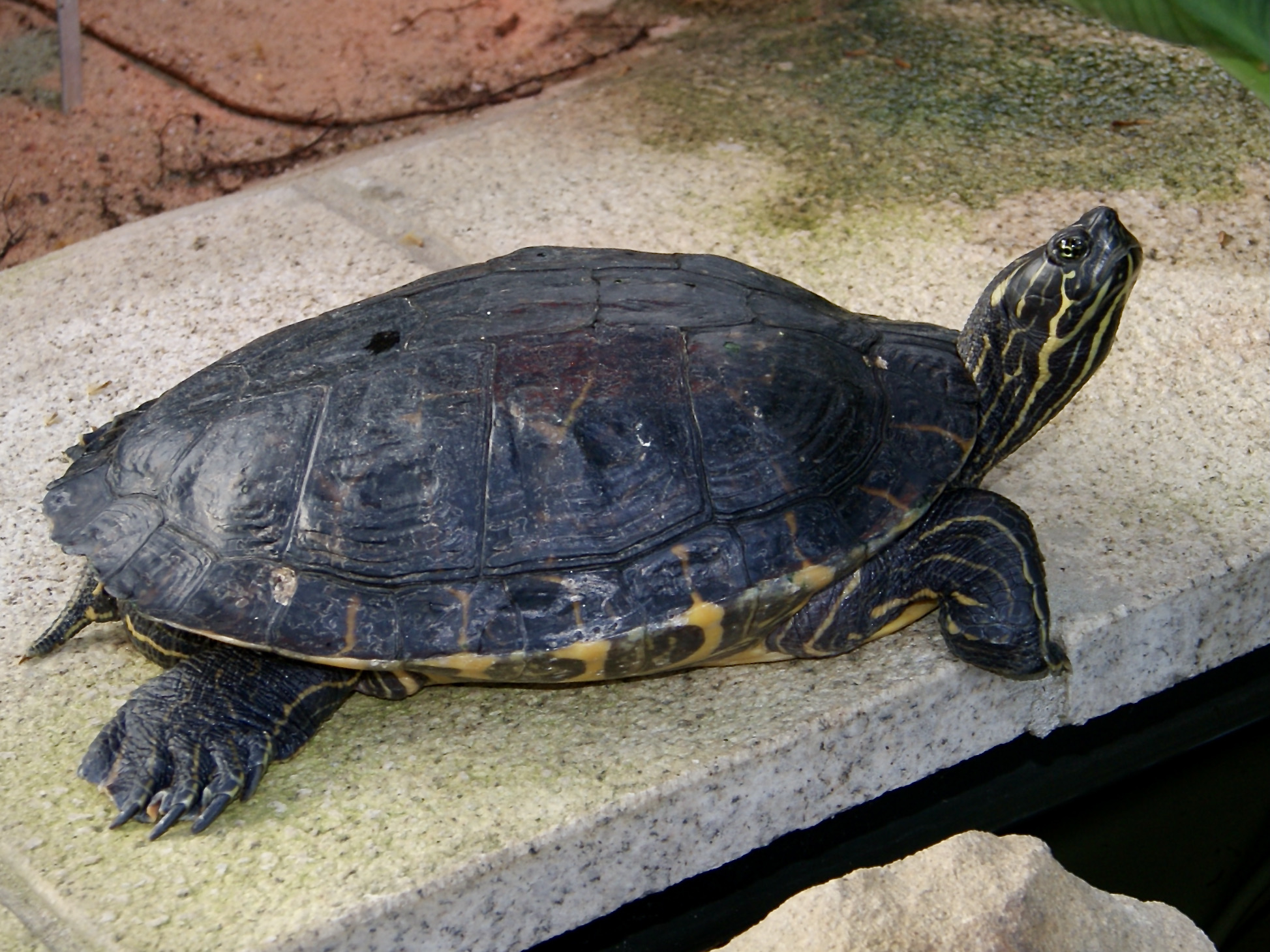
- River cooter (Pseudemys concinna)
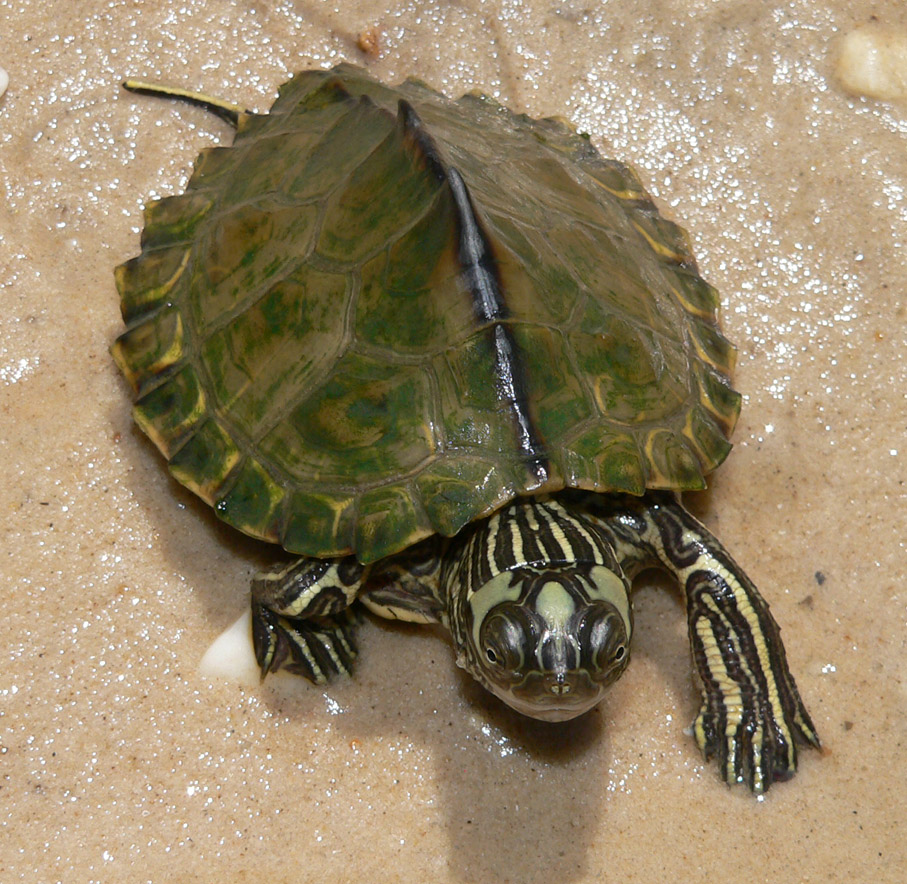
- Escambia map turtle (Graptemys ernsti)
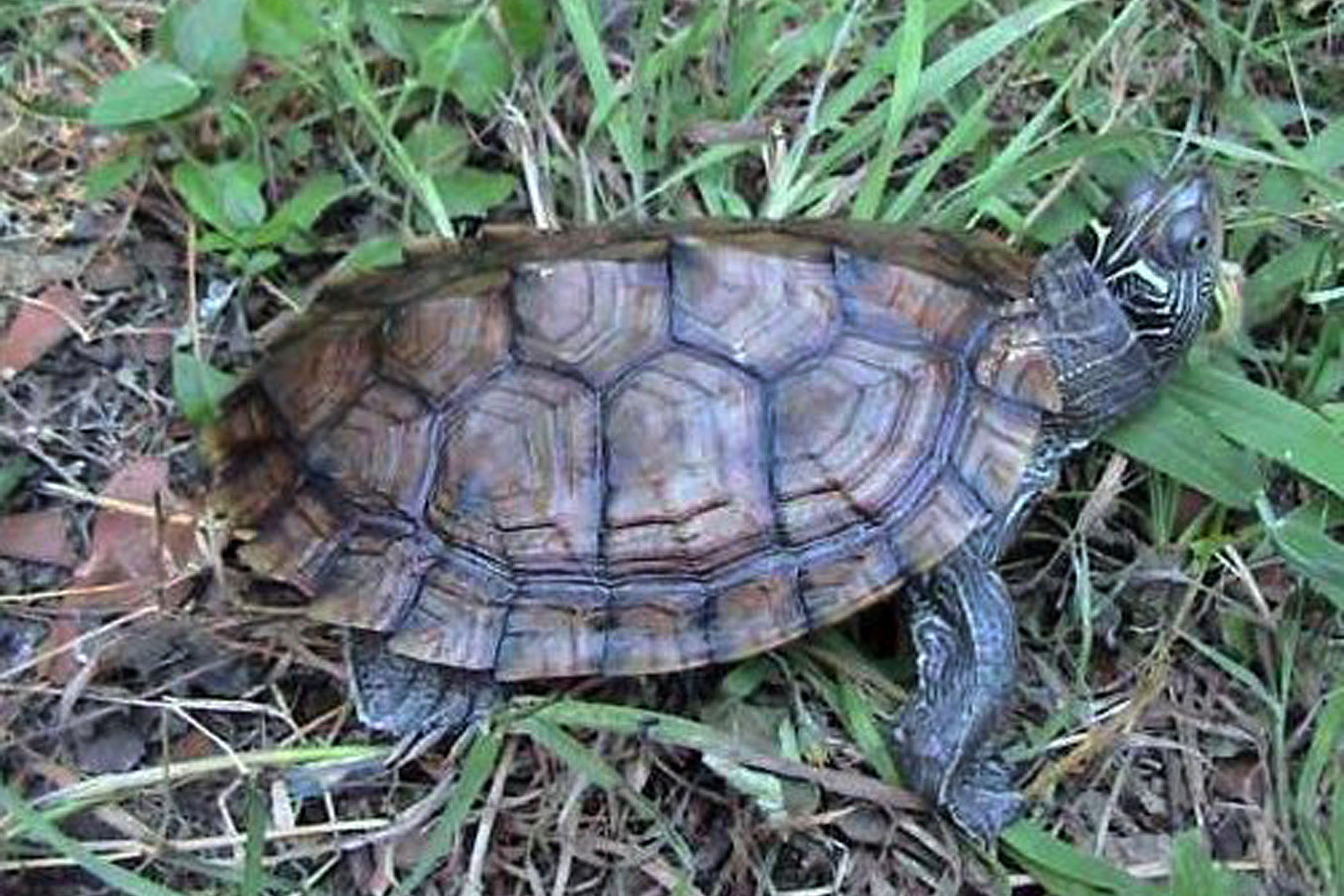
- False map turtle (Graptemys pseudogeographica)
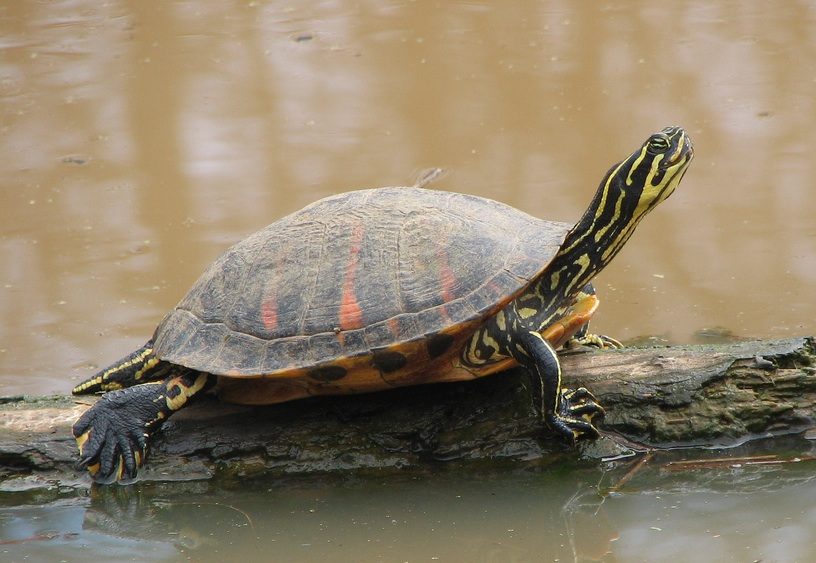
- Florida red-bellied cooter (Pseudemys nelsoni)
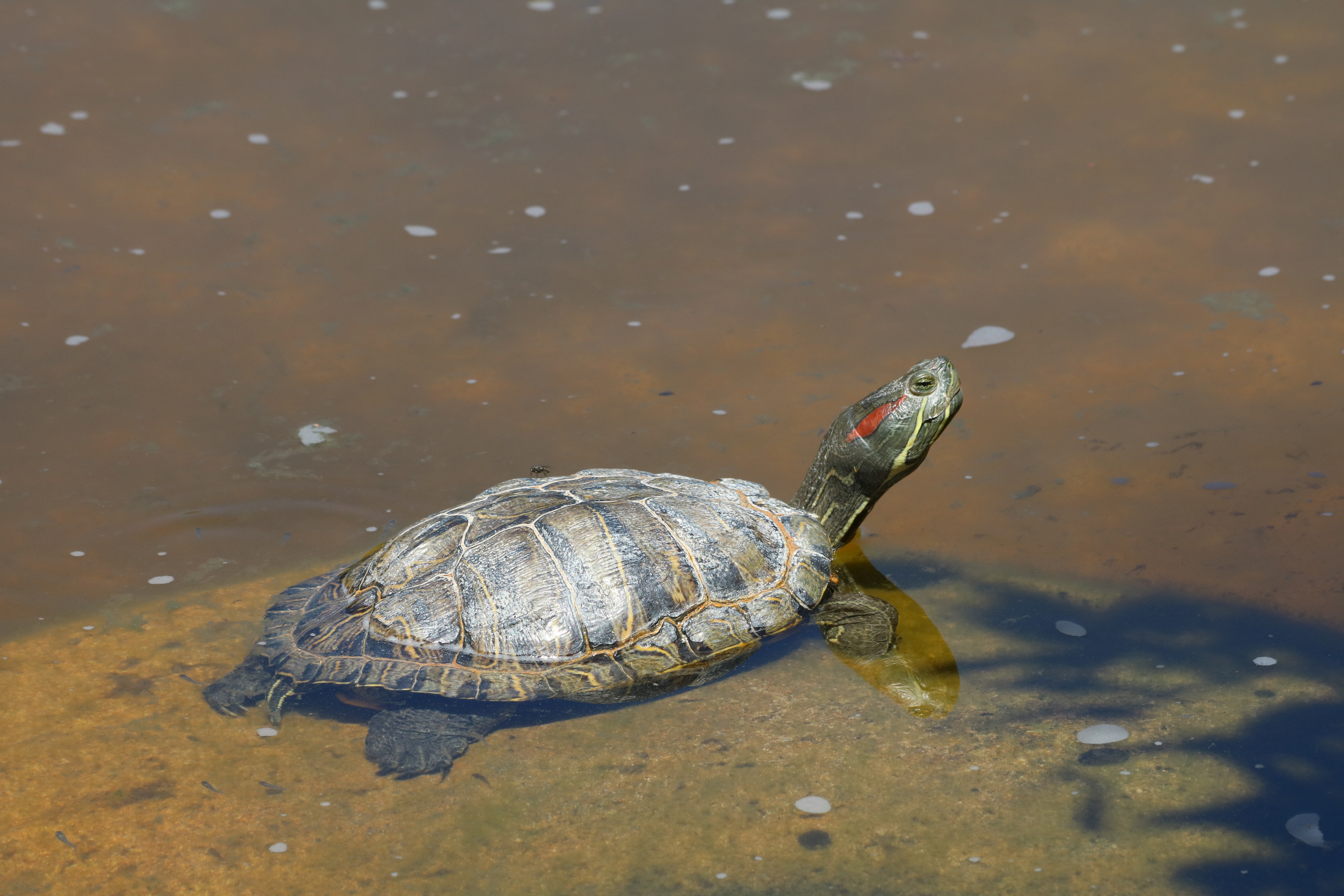
- Pond slider (Trachemys scripta)
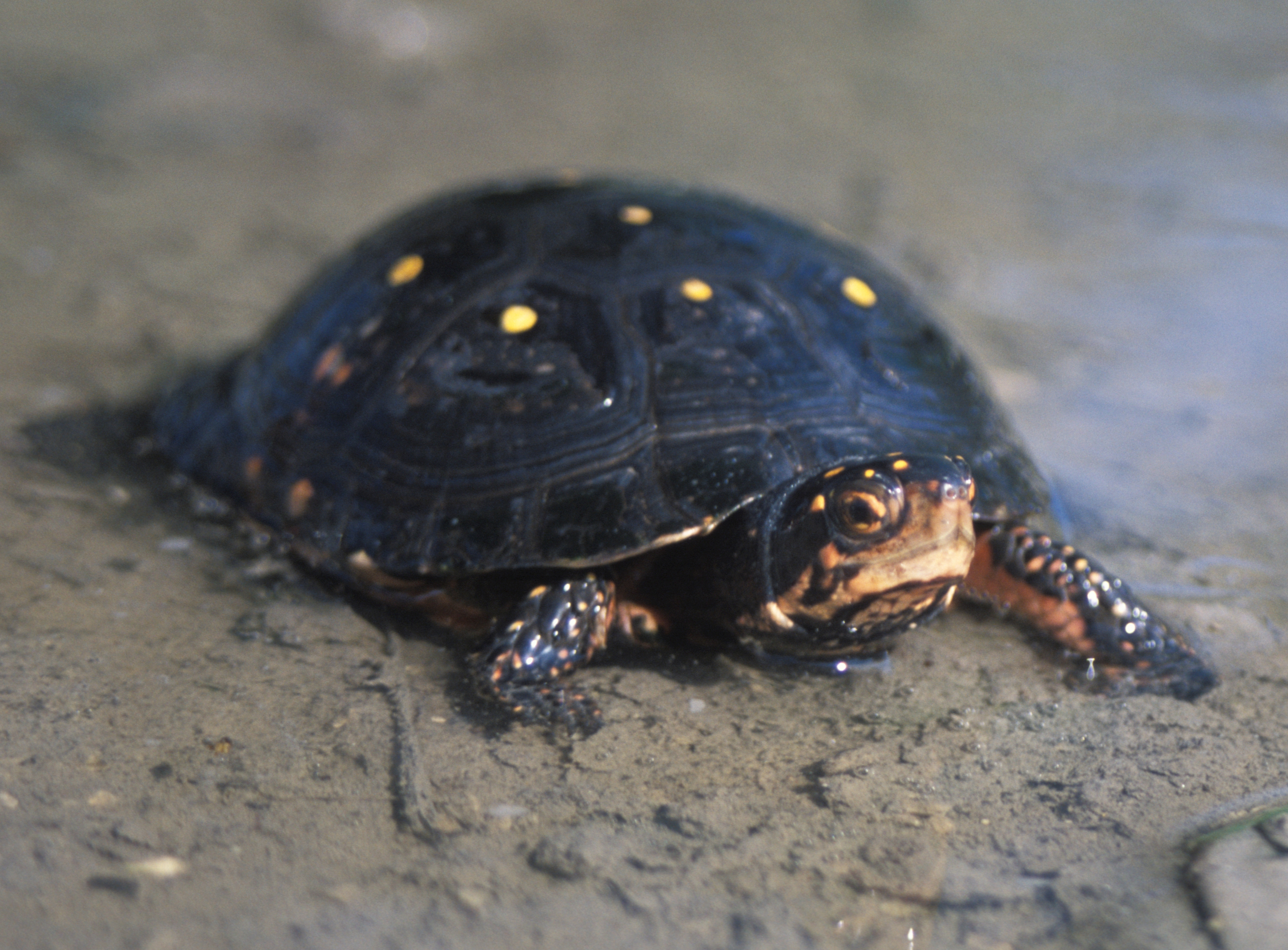
- Spotted turtle (Clemmys guttata)
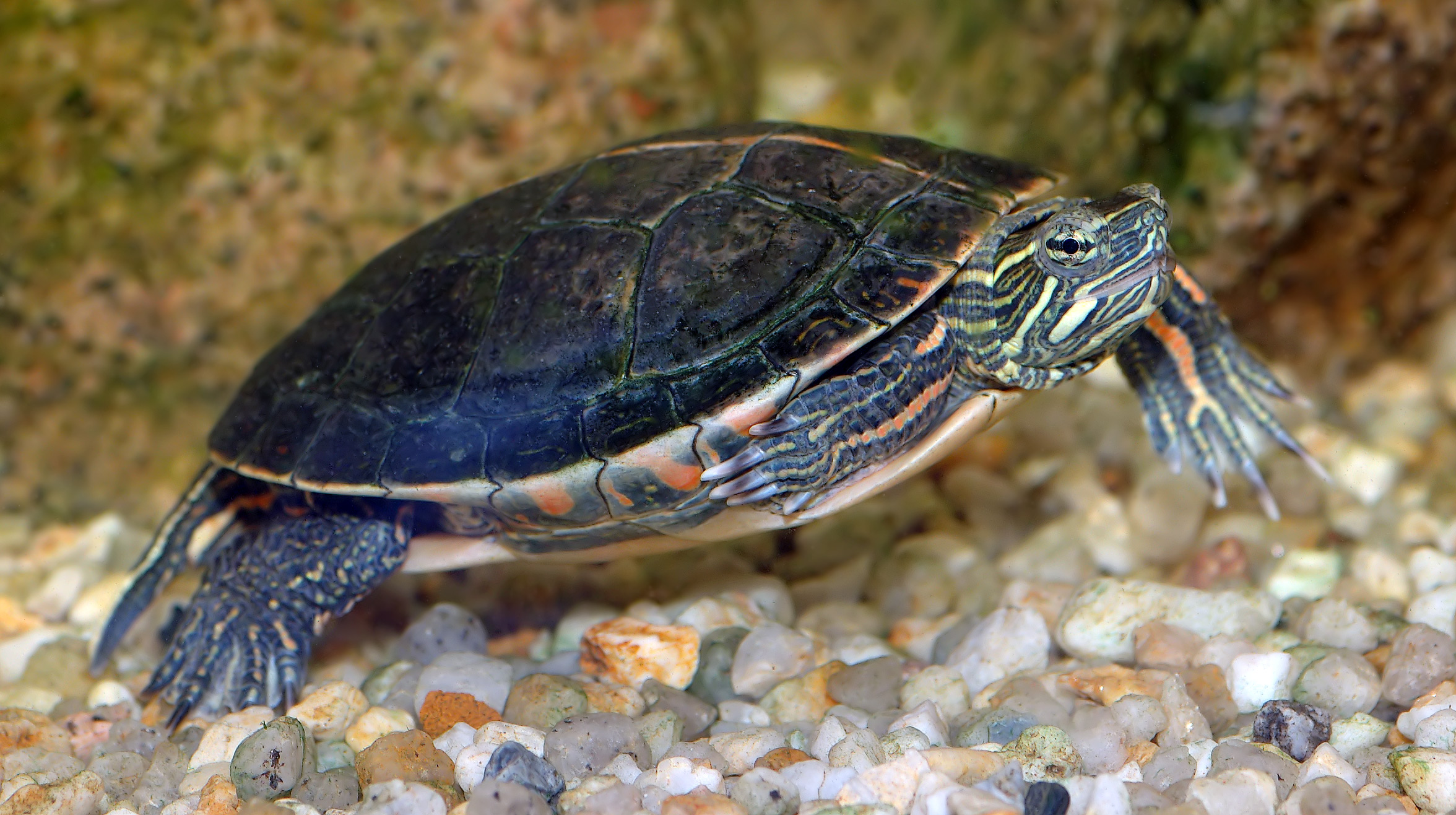
- Painted turtle (Chrysemys picta)
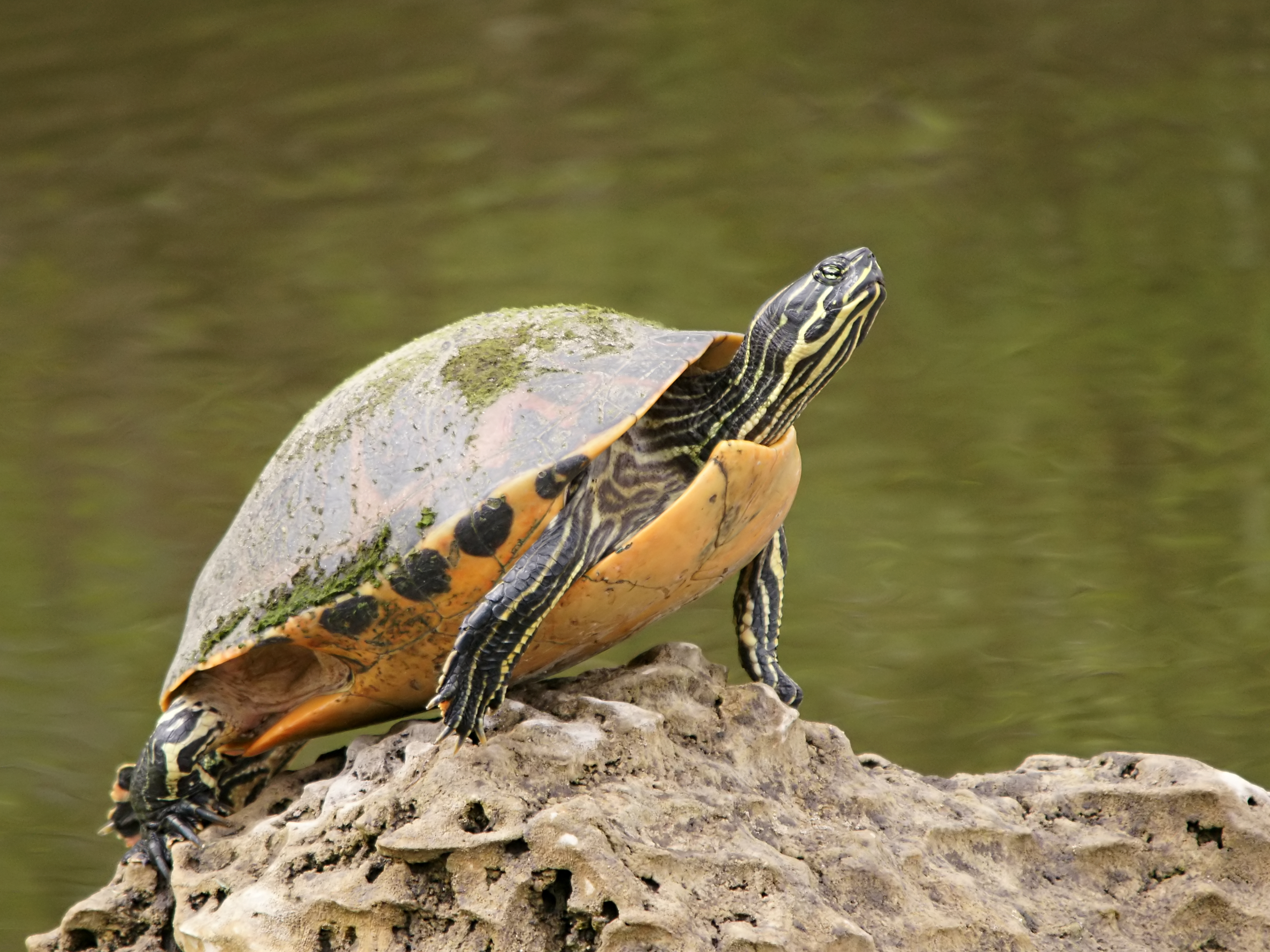
- Peninsula cooter (Pseudemys peninsularis)
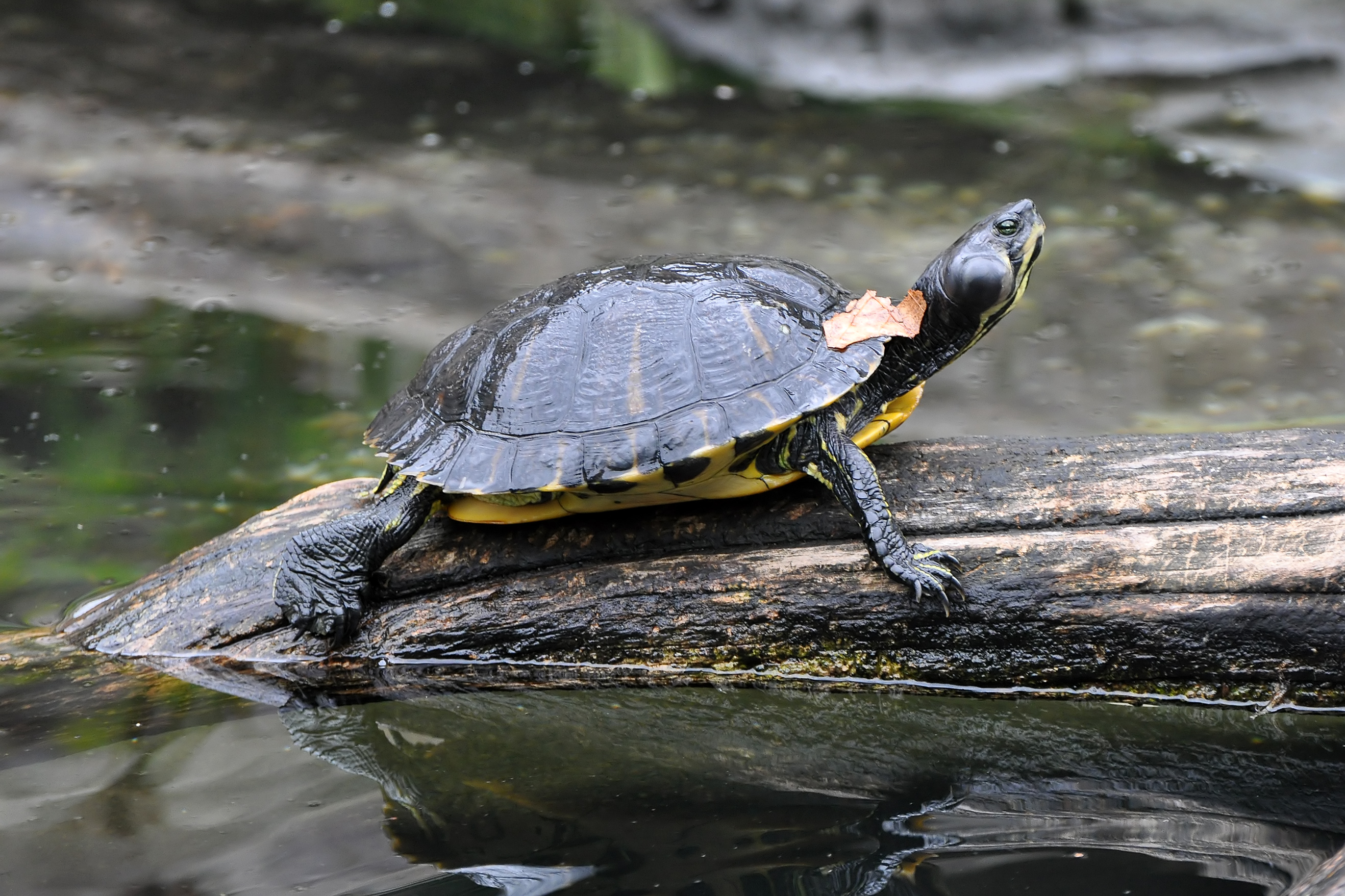
- Yellow-bellied slider

=== Snapping turtles ===
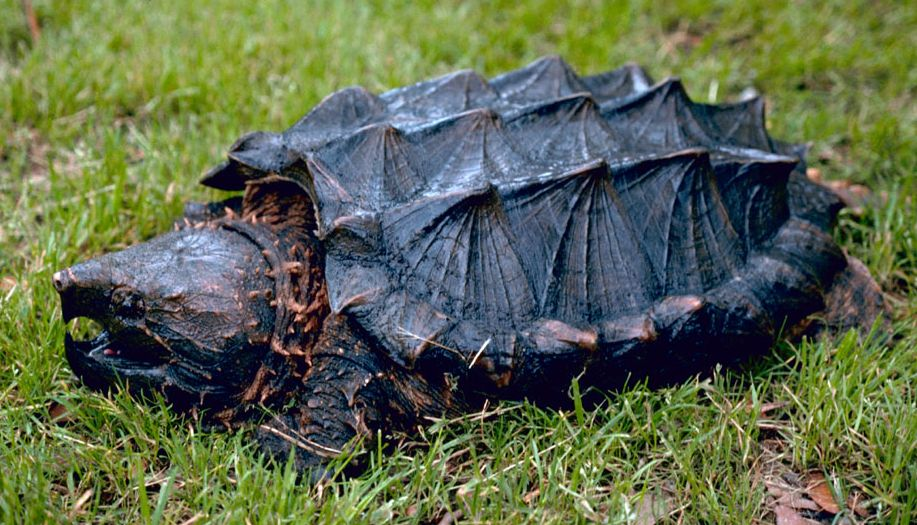
- Alligator snapping turtle (Macrochelys temminckii)
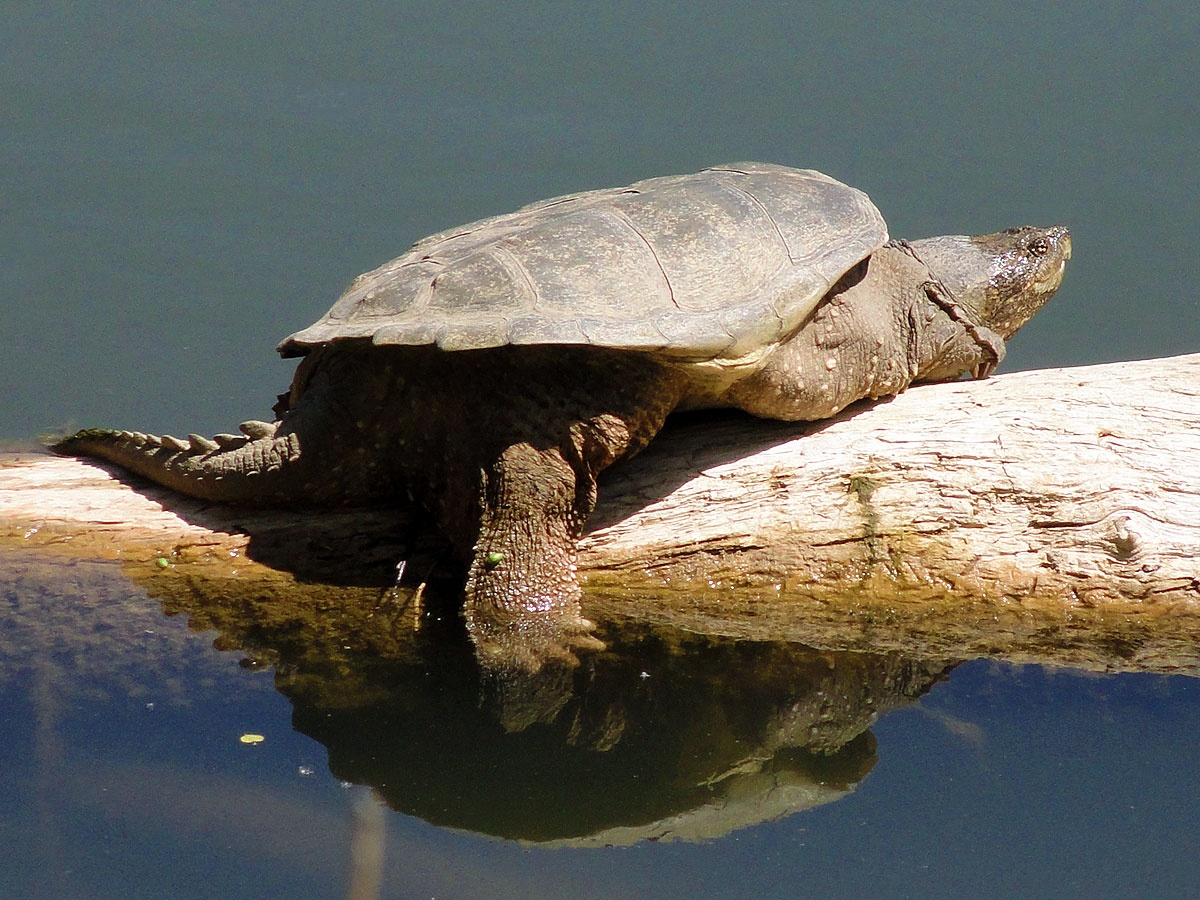
- Common snapping turtle (Chelydra serpentina)

=== Mud turtles ===
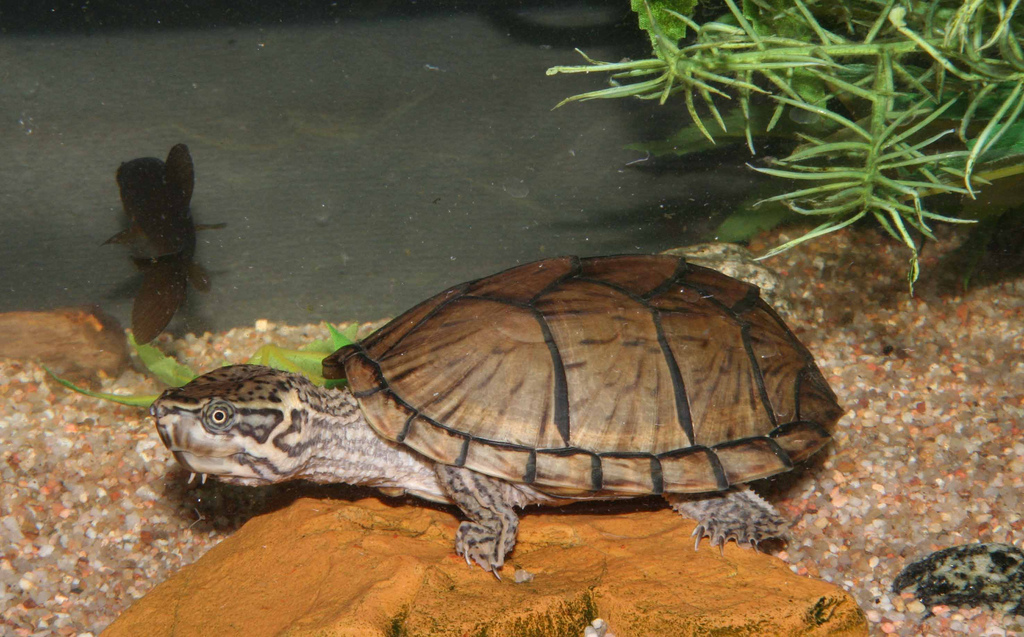
- Common musk turtle (Sternotherus odoratus)
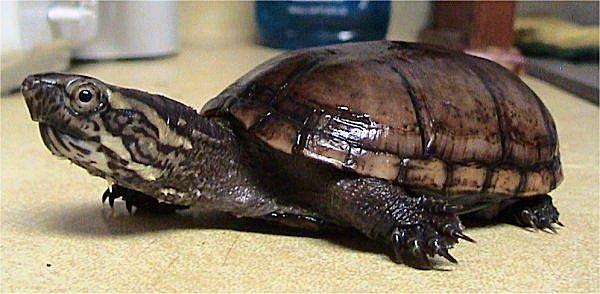
- Eastern mud turtle (Kinosternon subrubrum)
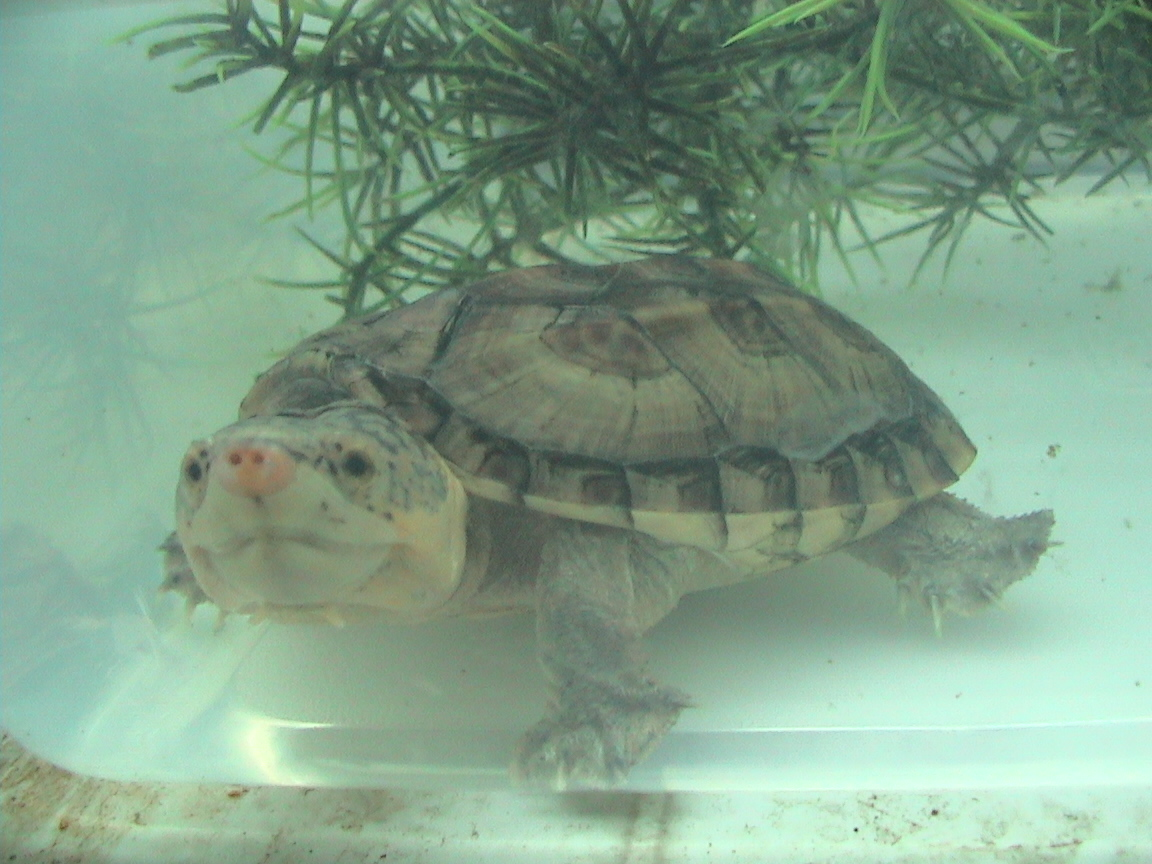
- Giant musk turtle (Staurotypus salvinii) - introduced
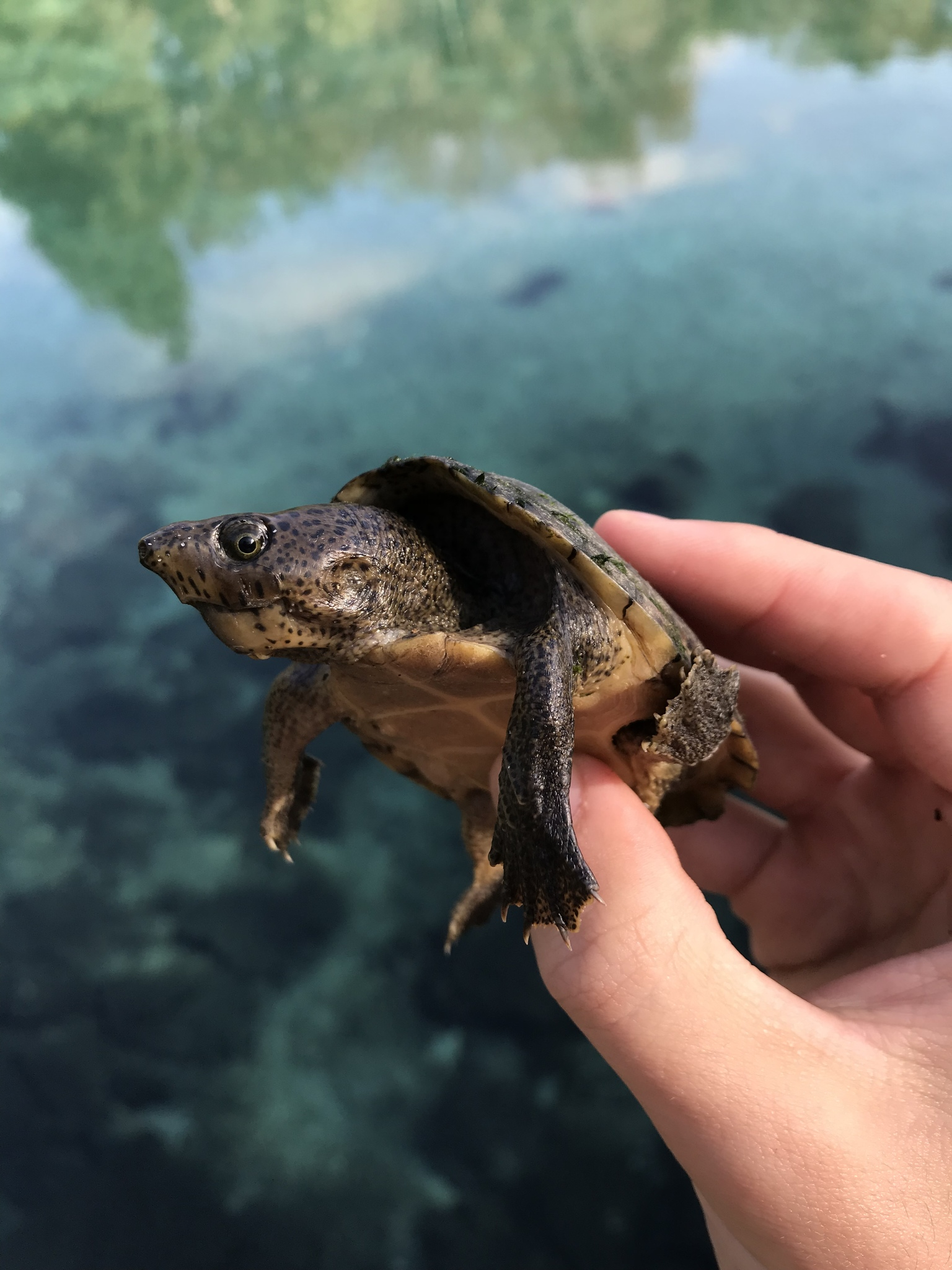
- Loggerhead musk turtle (Sternotherus minor)
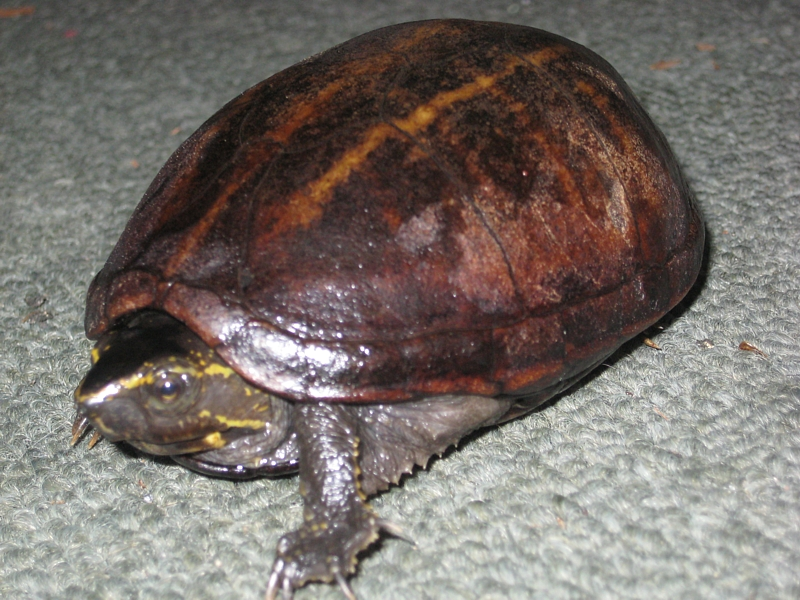
- Striped mud turtle (Kinosternon baurii)
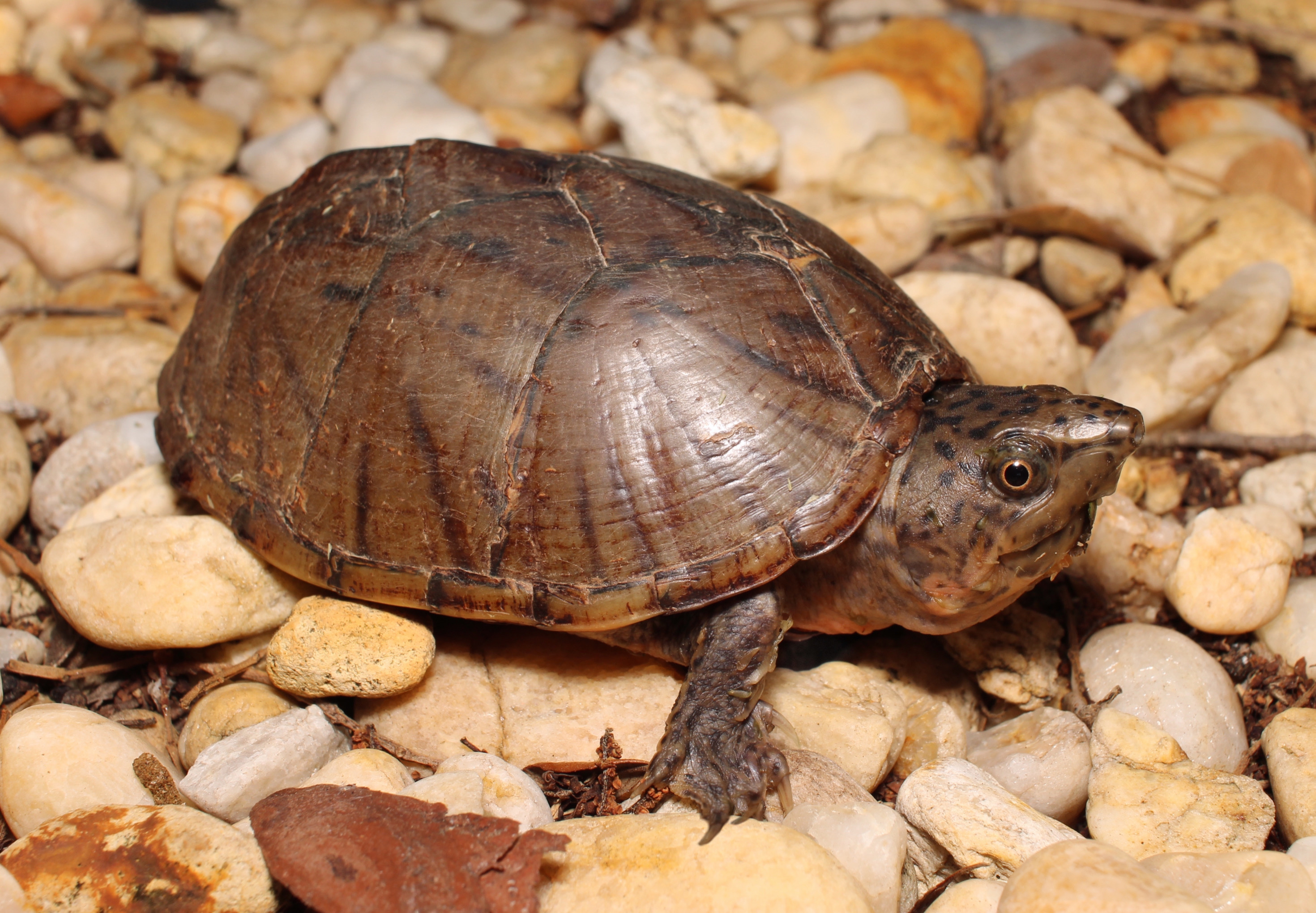
- Intermediate mud turtle (Sternotherus intermedius)
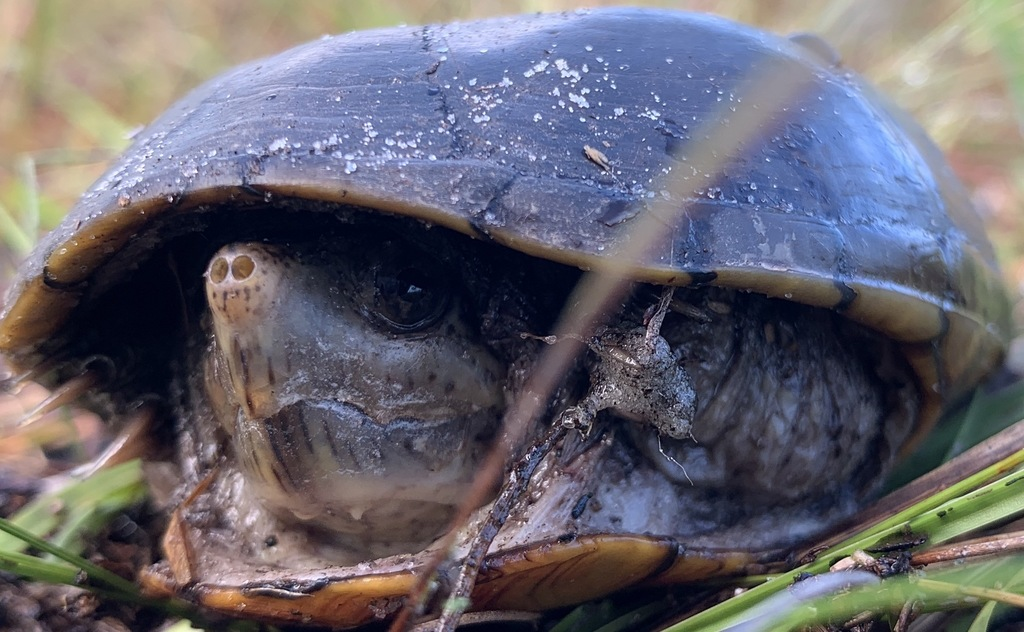
- Florida mud turtle (Kinosternon steindachneri)

=== Softshells ===
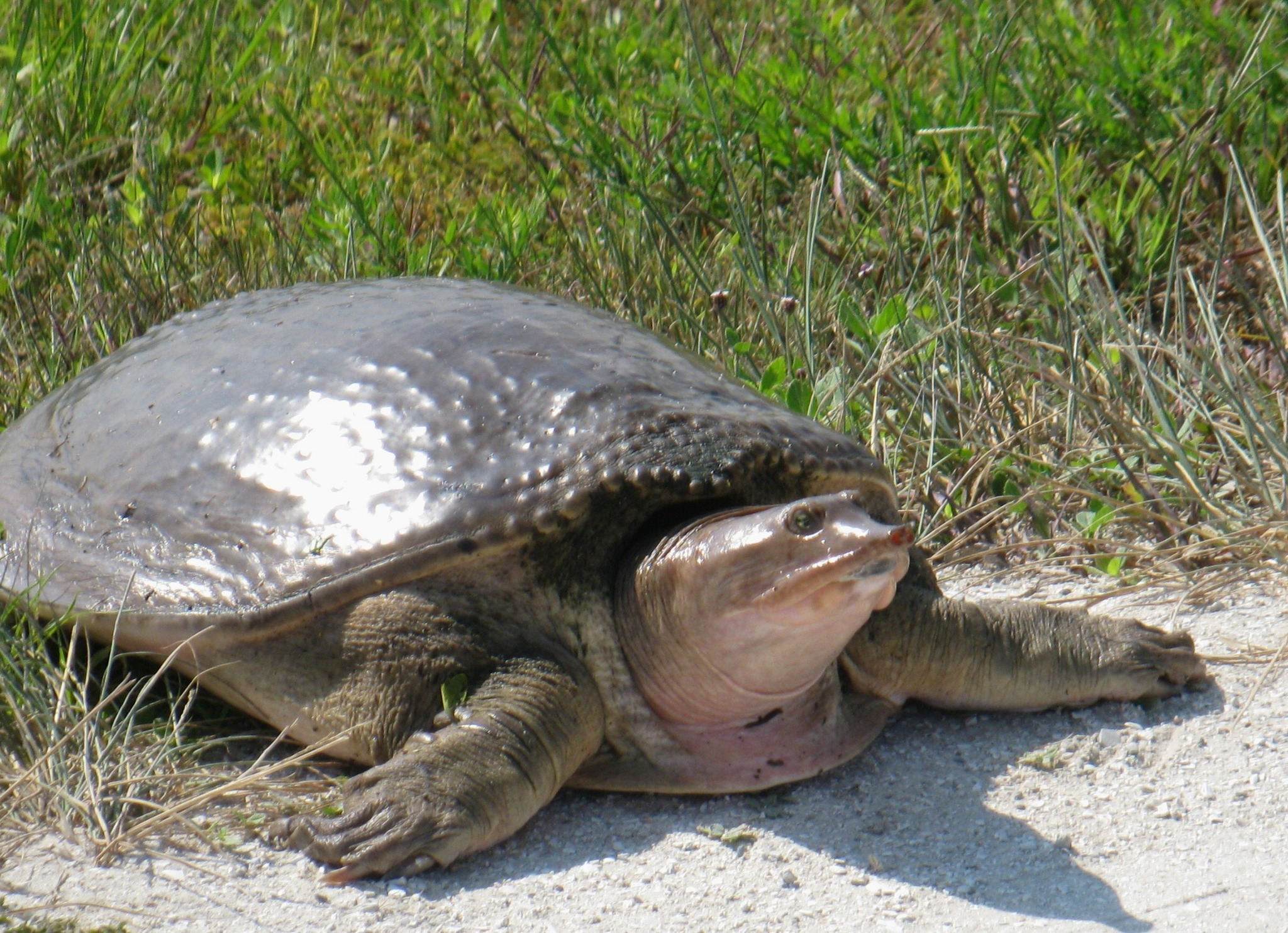
- Florida softshell turtle (Apalone ferox)
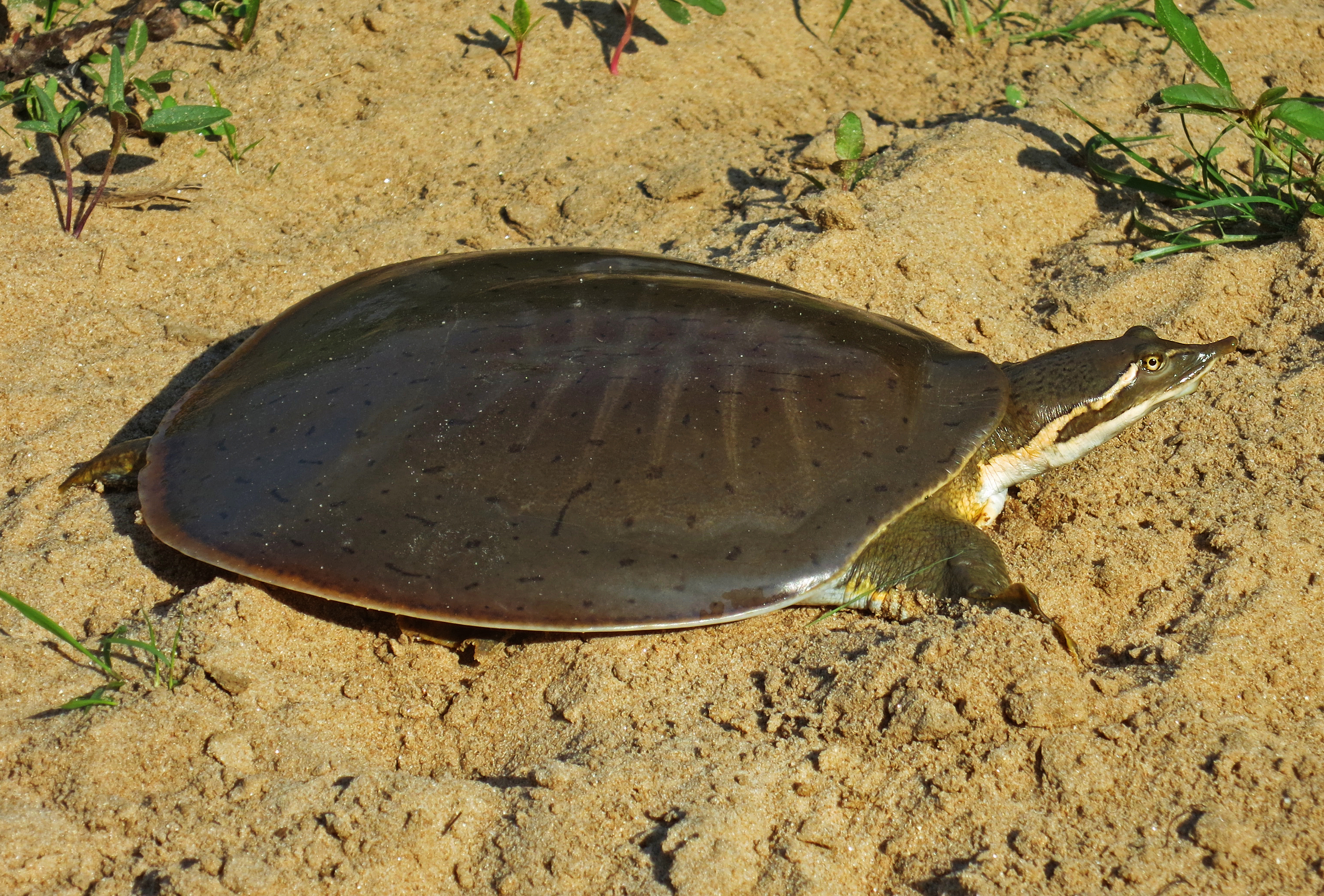
- Smooth softshell turtle (Apalone mutica)
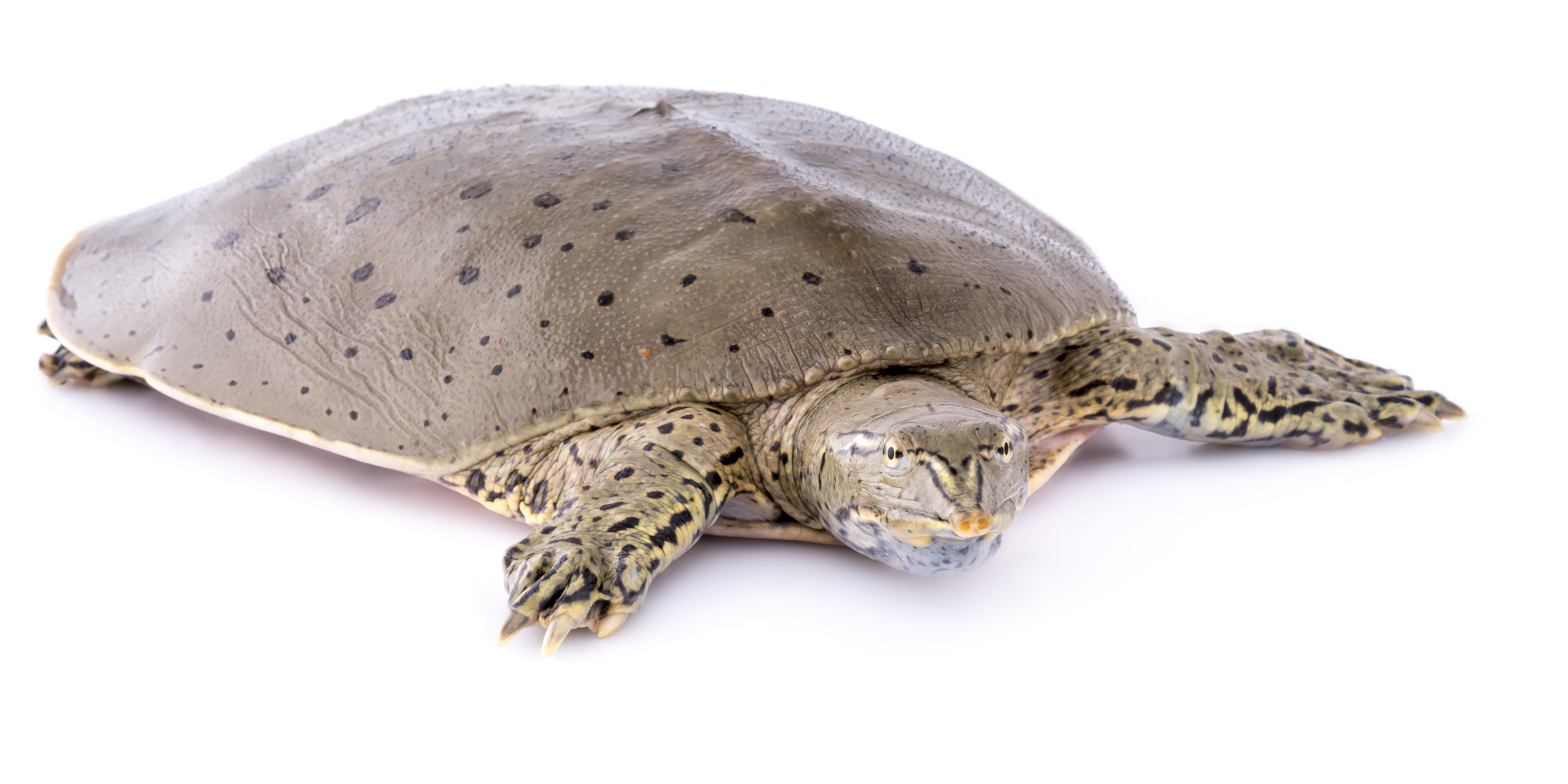
- Spiny softshell turtle (Apalone spinifera)

=== Leatherback ===
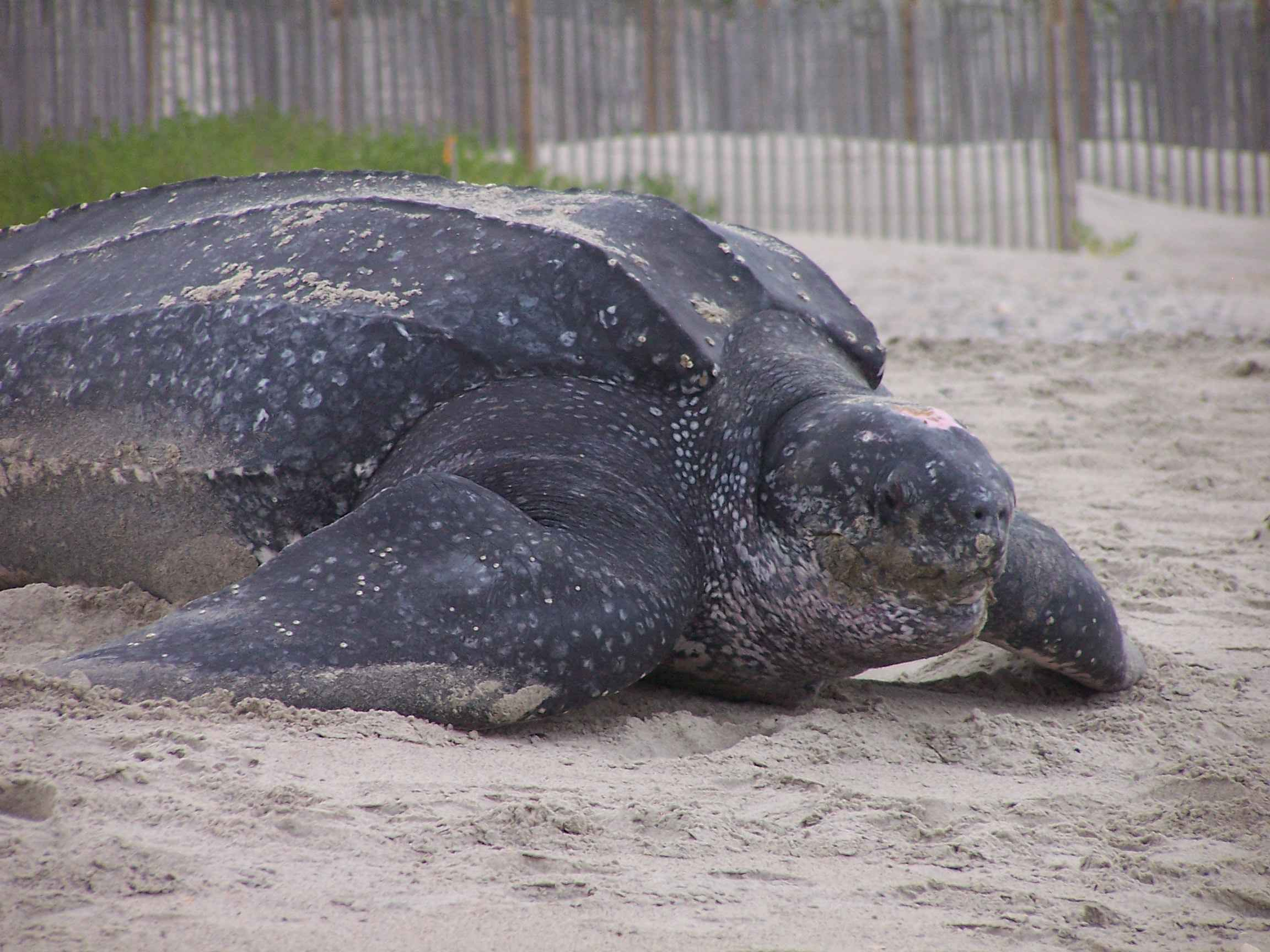
- Leatherback sea turtle (Dermochelys coriacea)

=== Sea turtles ===
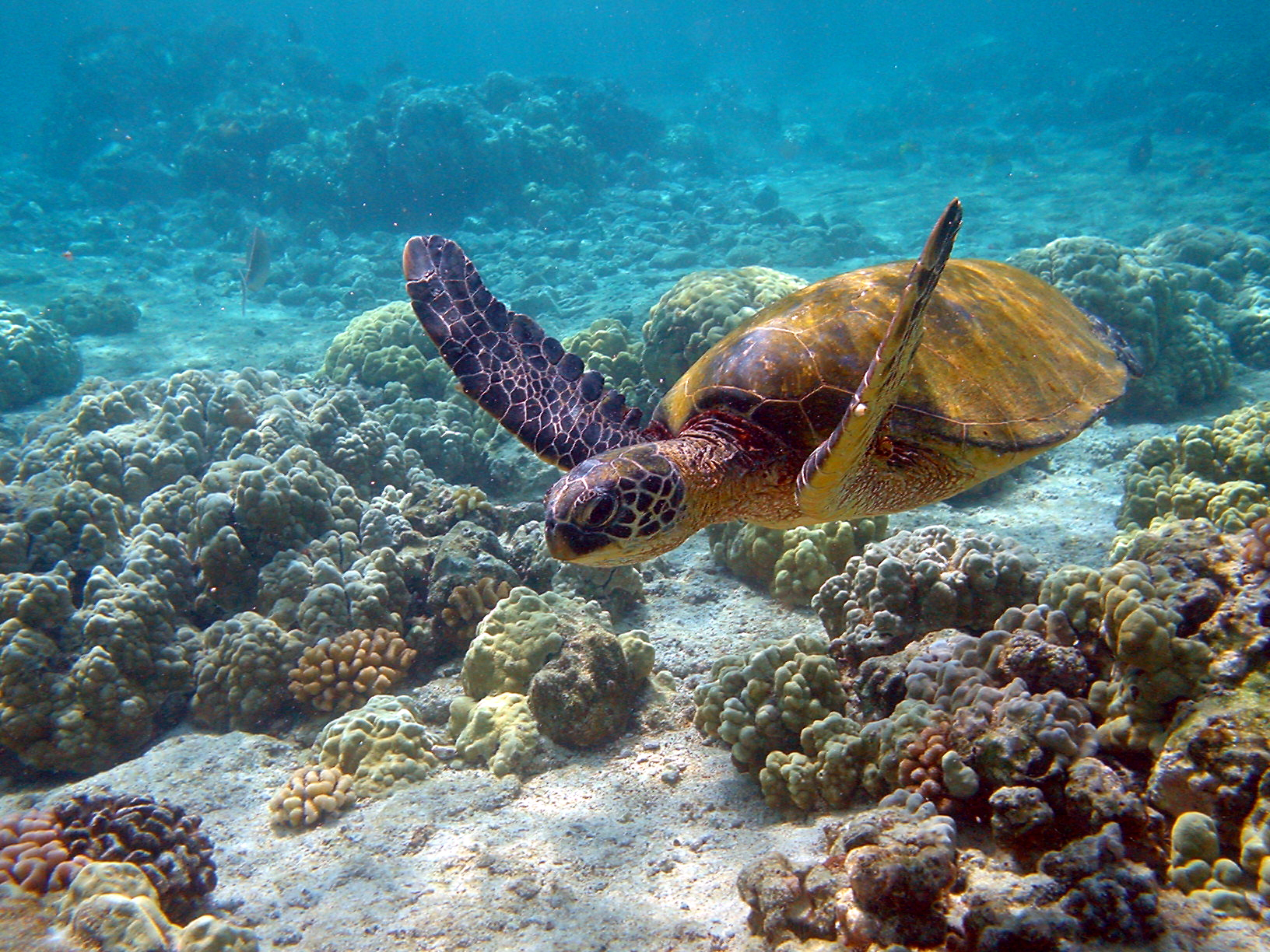
- Green sea turtle (Chelonia mydas)
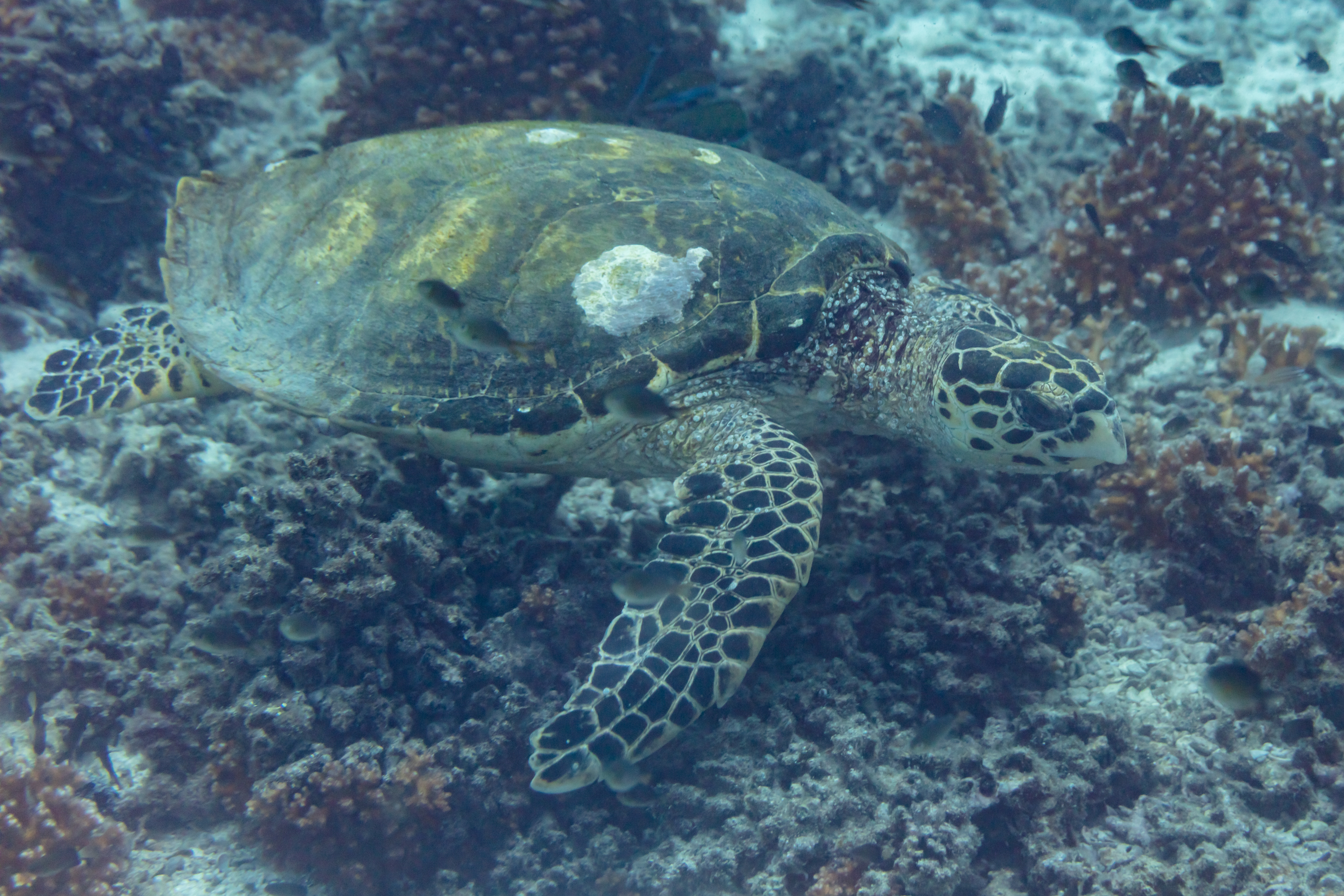
- Hawksbill sea turtle (Eretmochelys imbricata)
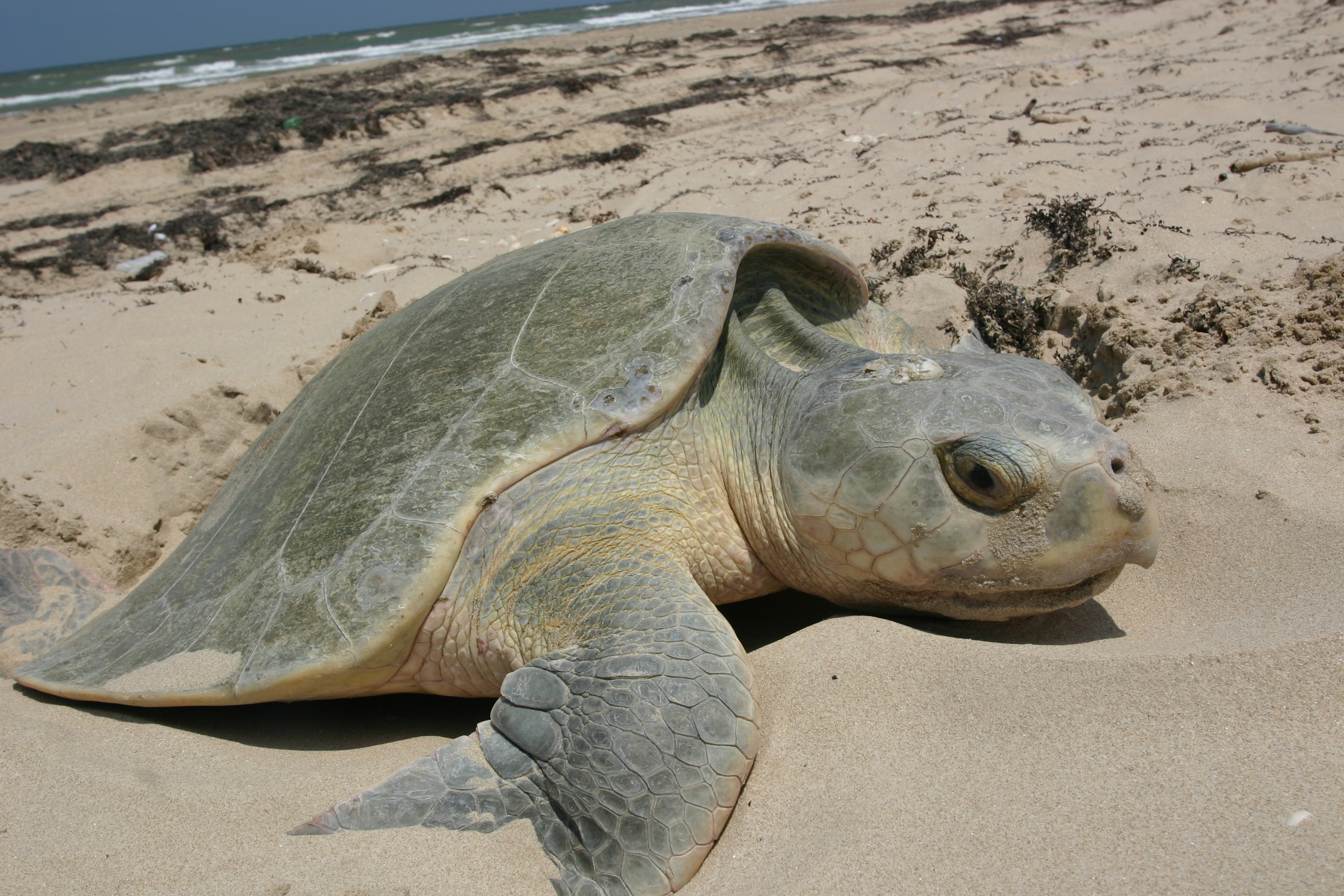
- Kemp's ridley sea turtle - rare vagrant (Lepidochelys kempii)
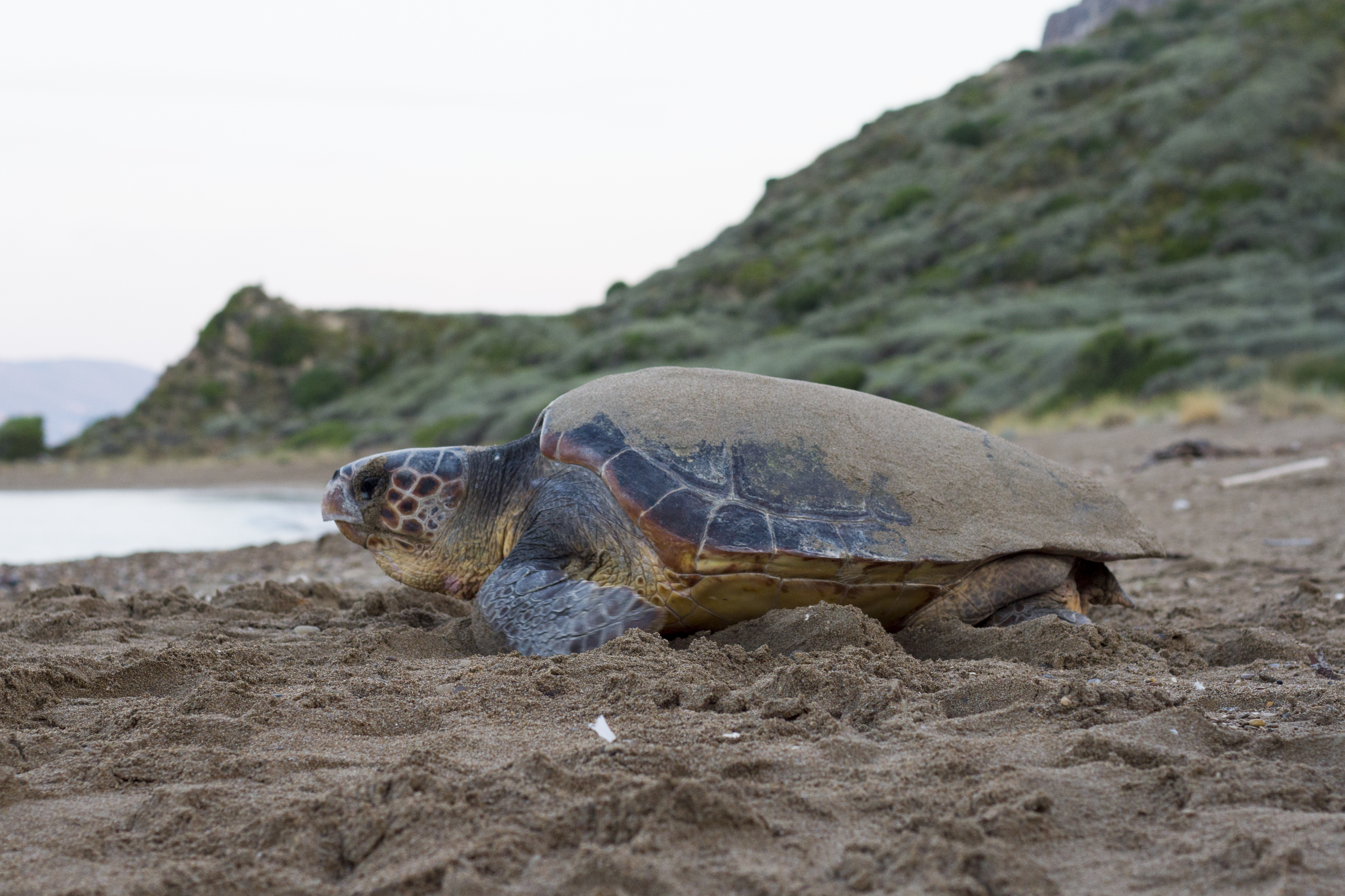
- Loggerhead sea turtle (Caretta caretta)
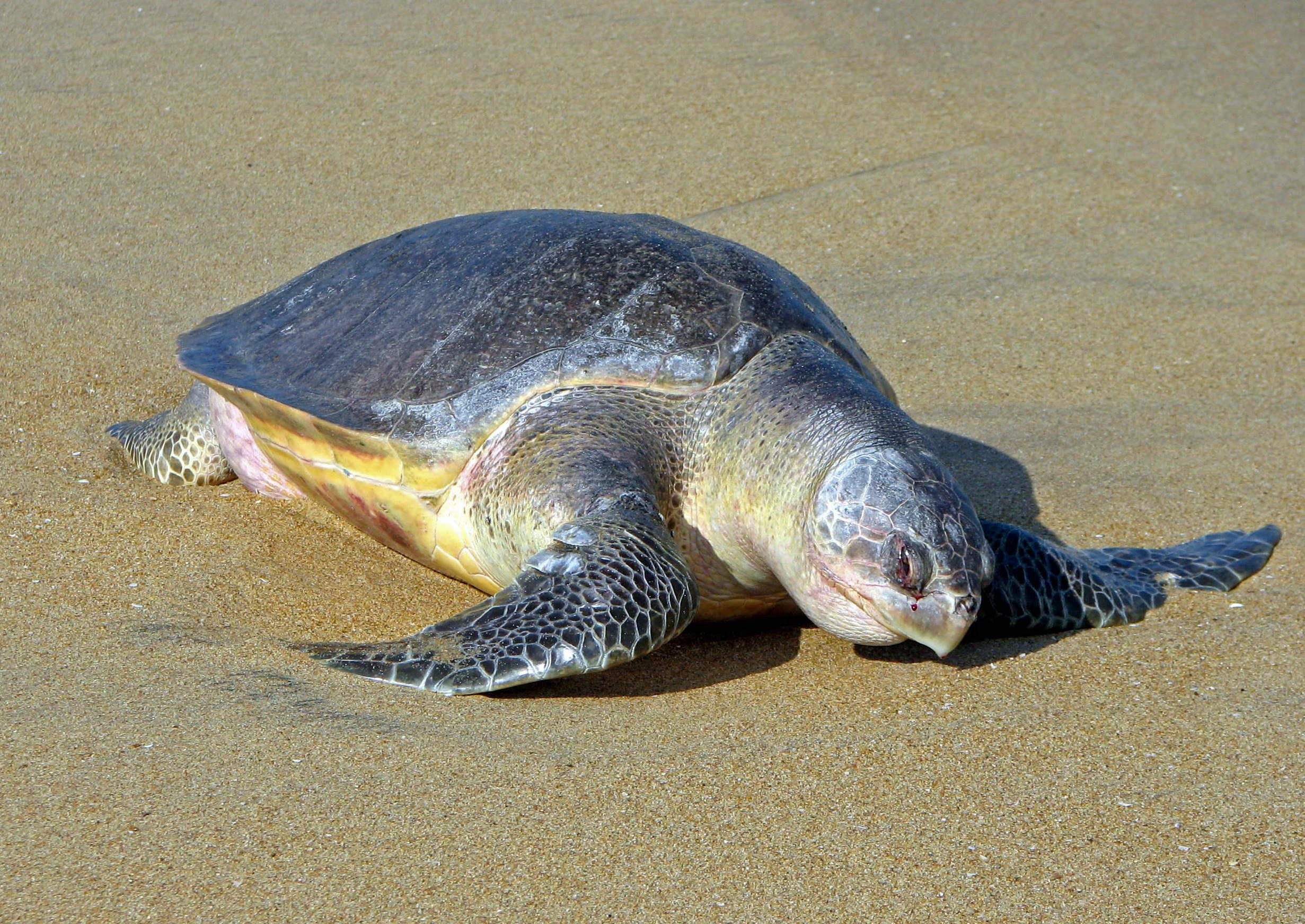
- Olive ridley sea turtle - extremely rare vagrant (Lepidochelys olivacea)

=== Tortoises ===
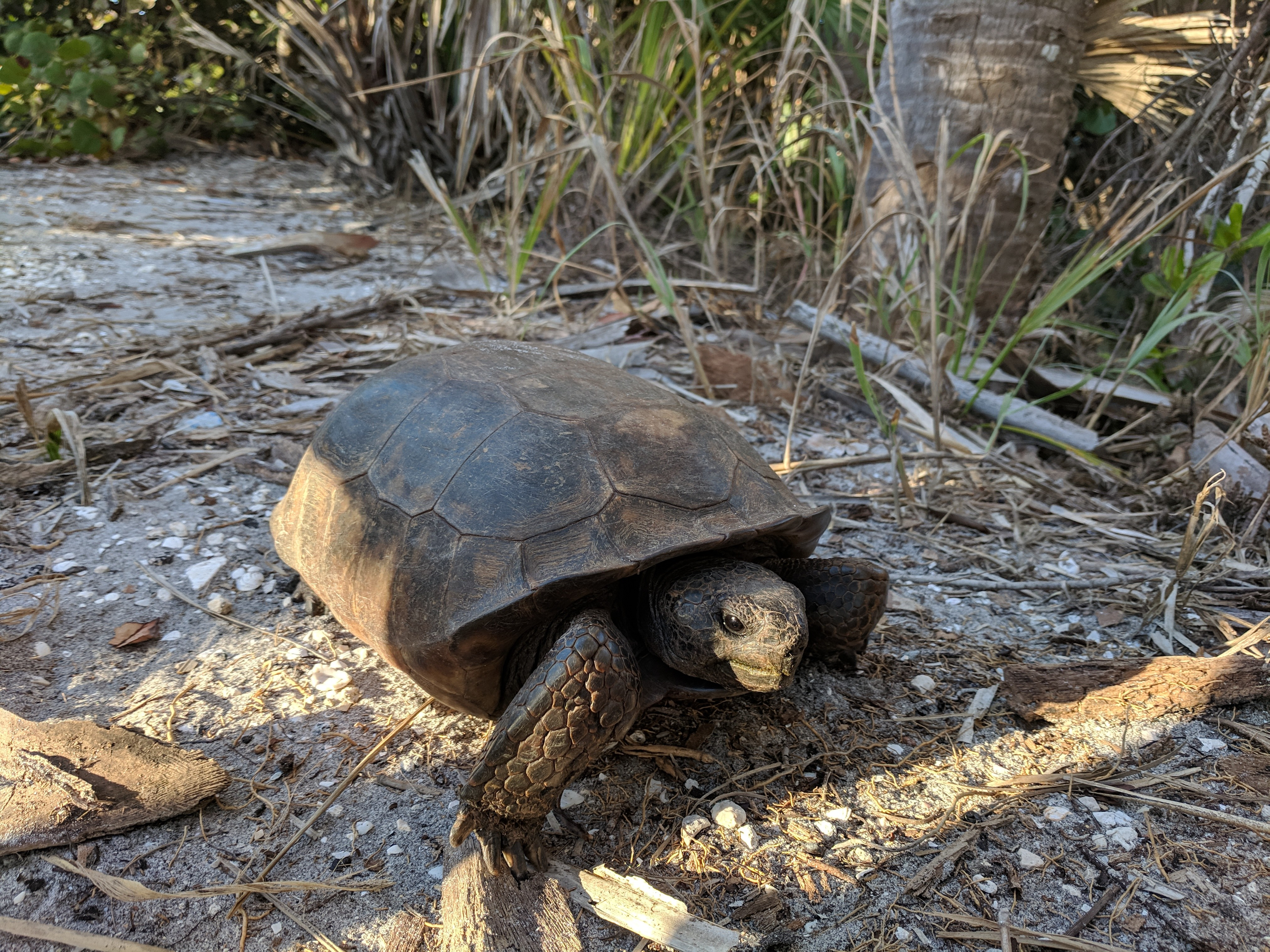
- Gopher tortoise (Gopherus polyphemus)

== Crocodilians ==
There are three species of Crocodilians found in Florida. They are the largest reptiles and the largest predators of the state.

=== Alligators ===
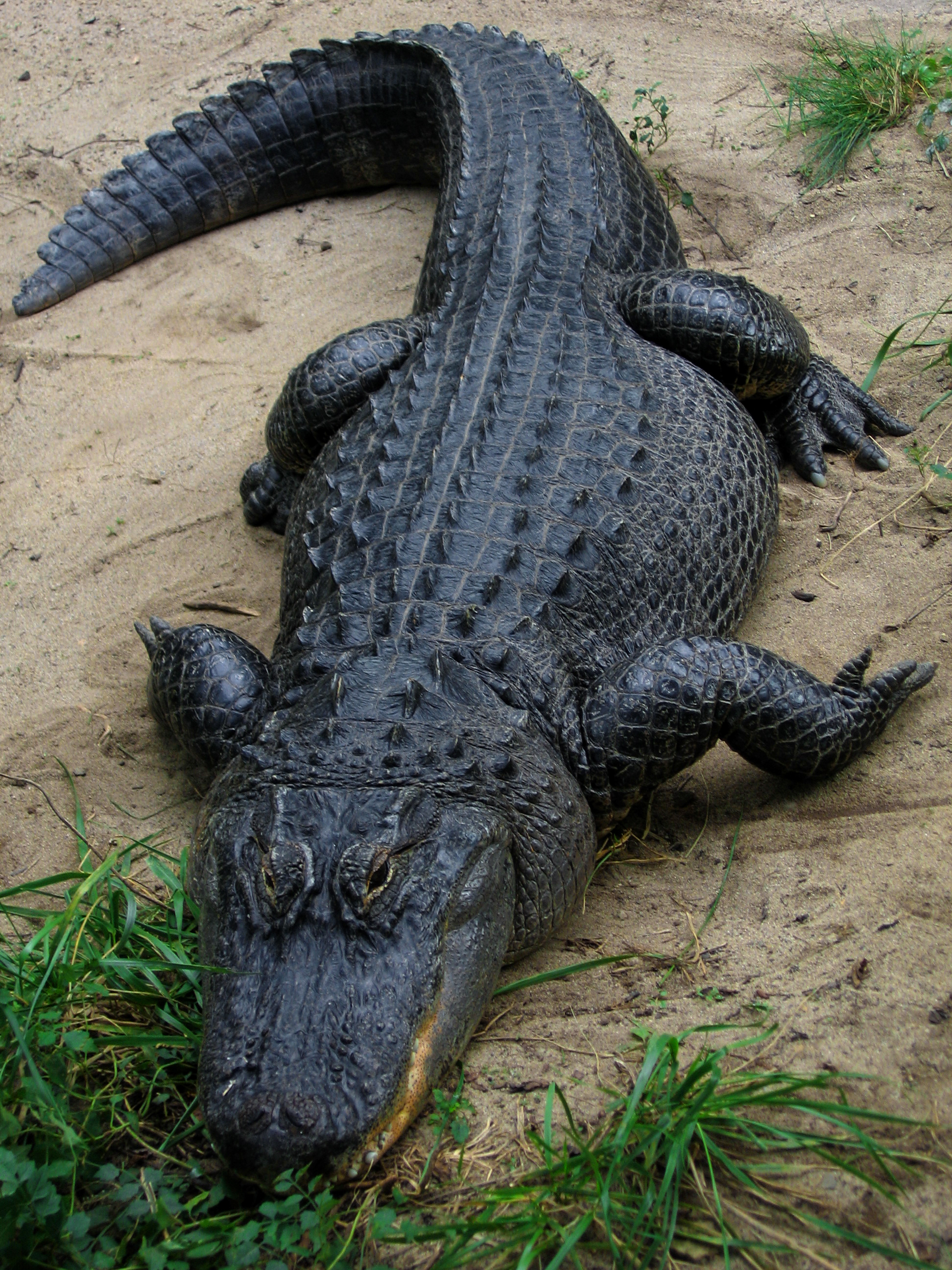
- American alligator (Alligator mississippiensis)
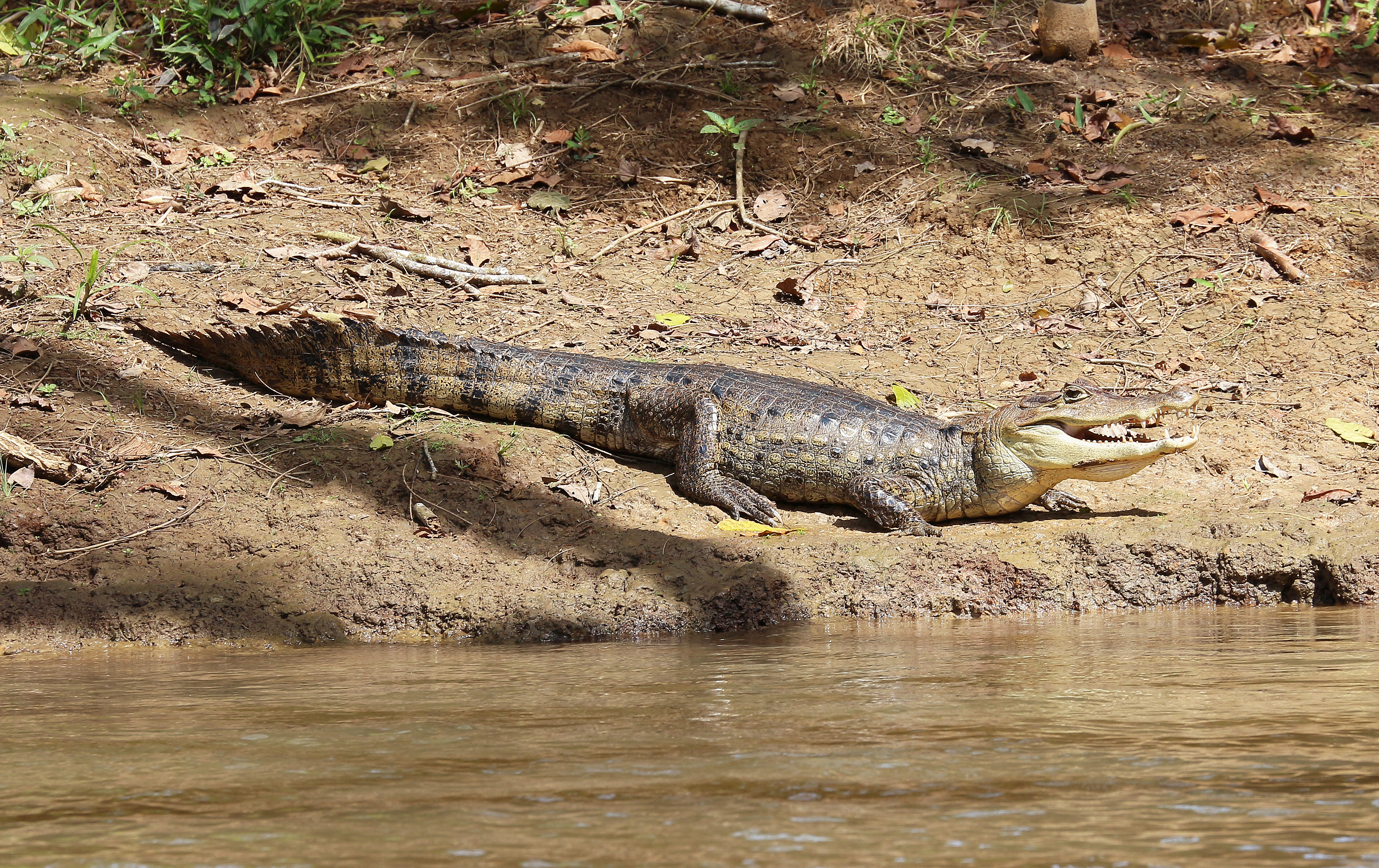
- Spectacled caiman (Caiman crocodilus) - introduced

=== Crocodiles ===
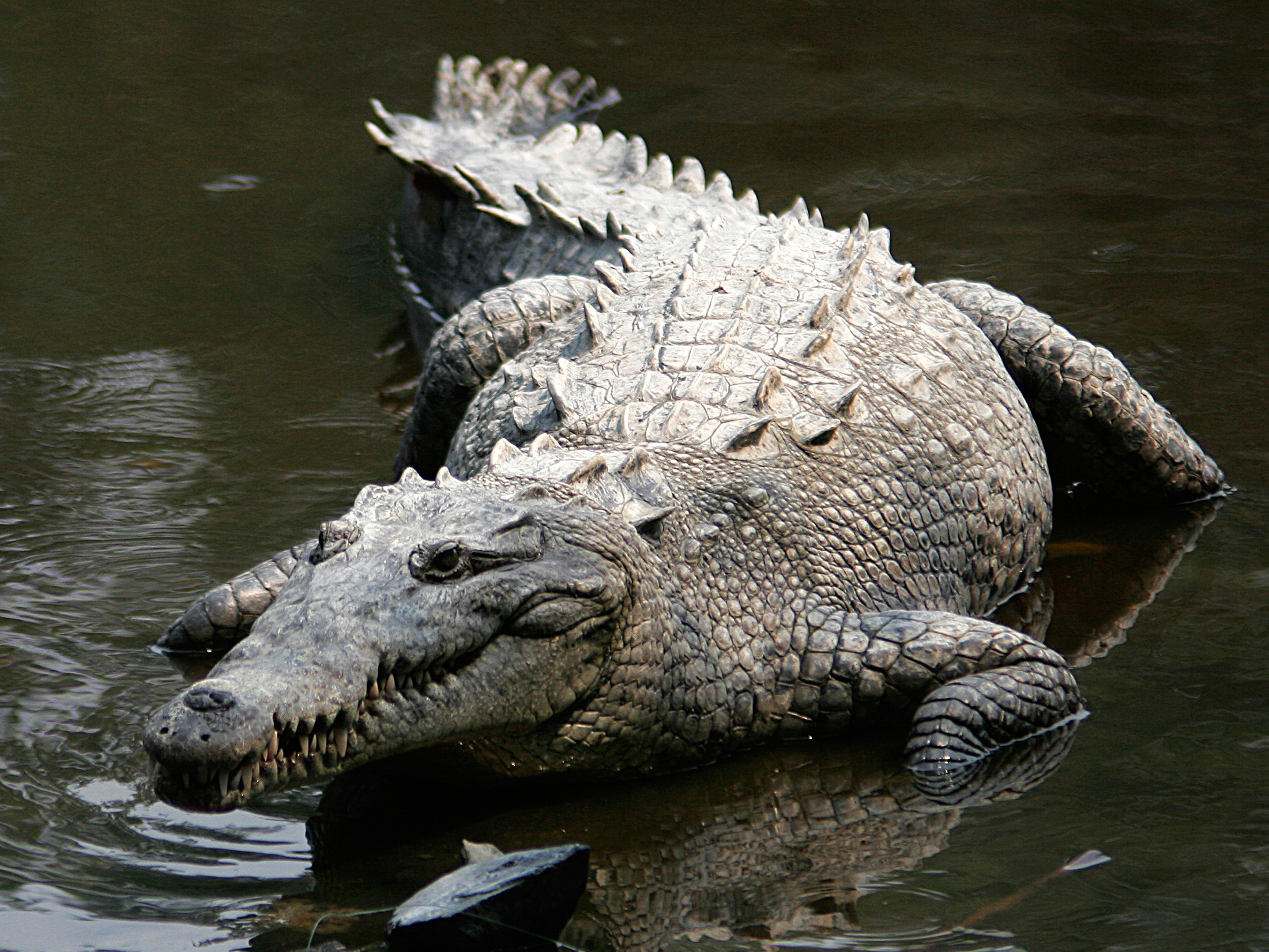
- American crocodile (Crocodylus acutus)

== Squamates (suborder Lacertilia) ==
The squamates are by far the largest reptile order. It is therefore divided into suborders. Lizards may be the most numerous reptiles in the state, though many species were introduced.

=== Phrynosomatidae ===
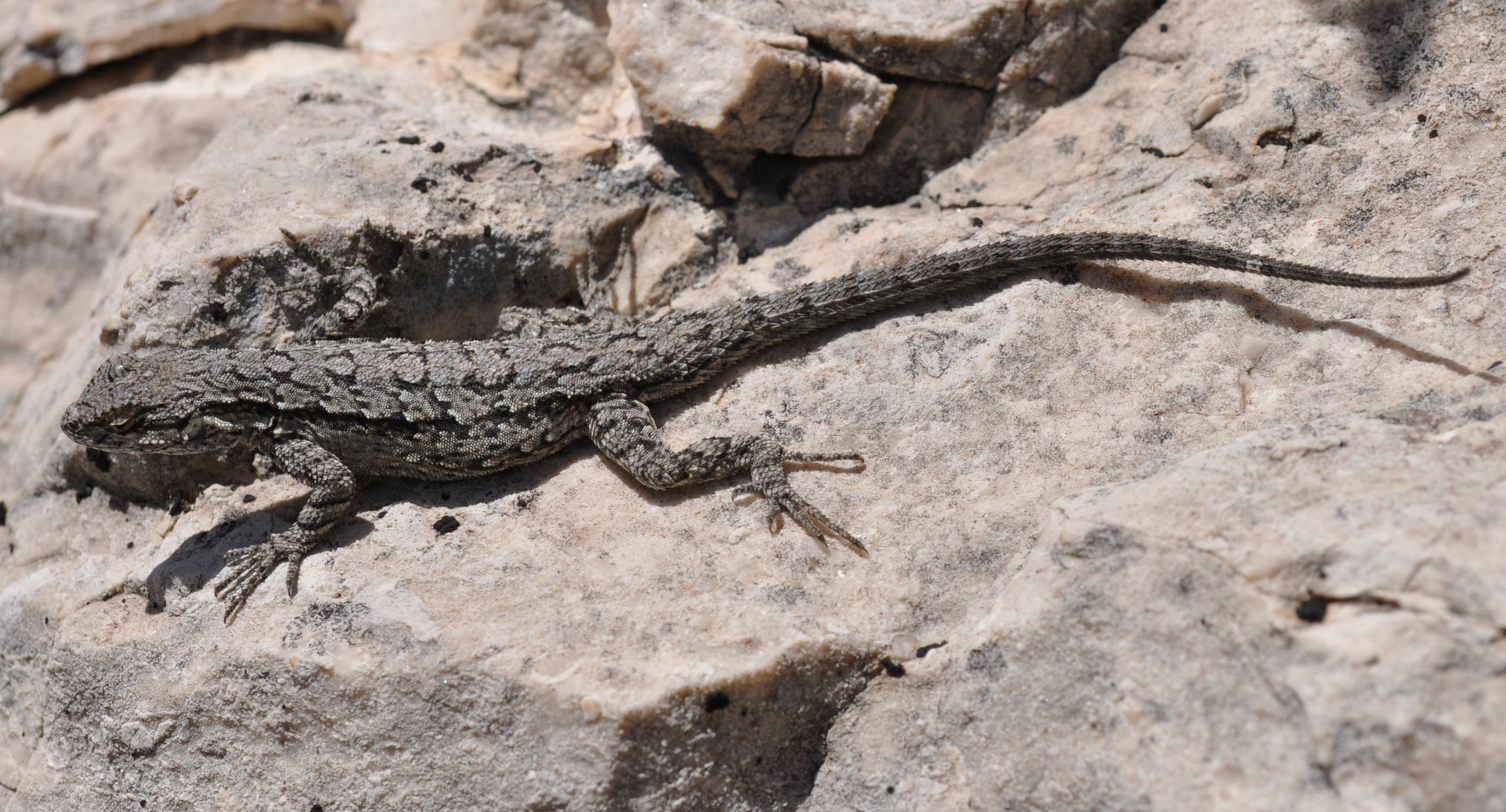
- Eastern fence lizard (Sceloporus undulatus)
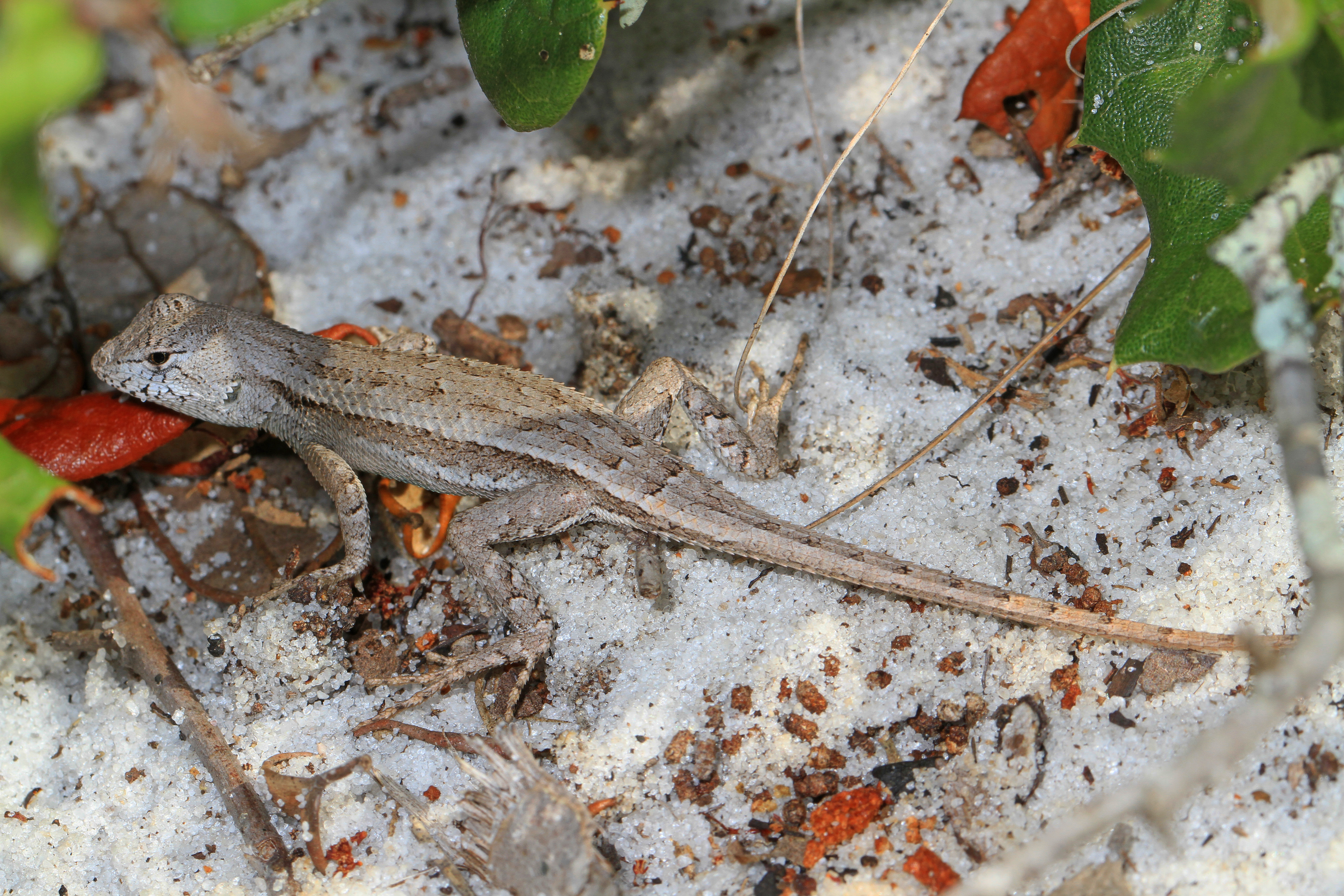
- Florida scrub lizard (Sceloporus woodi)
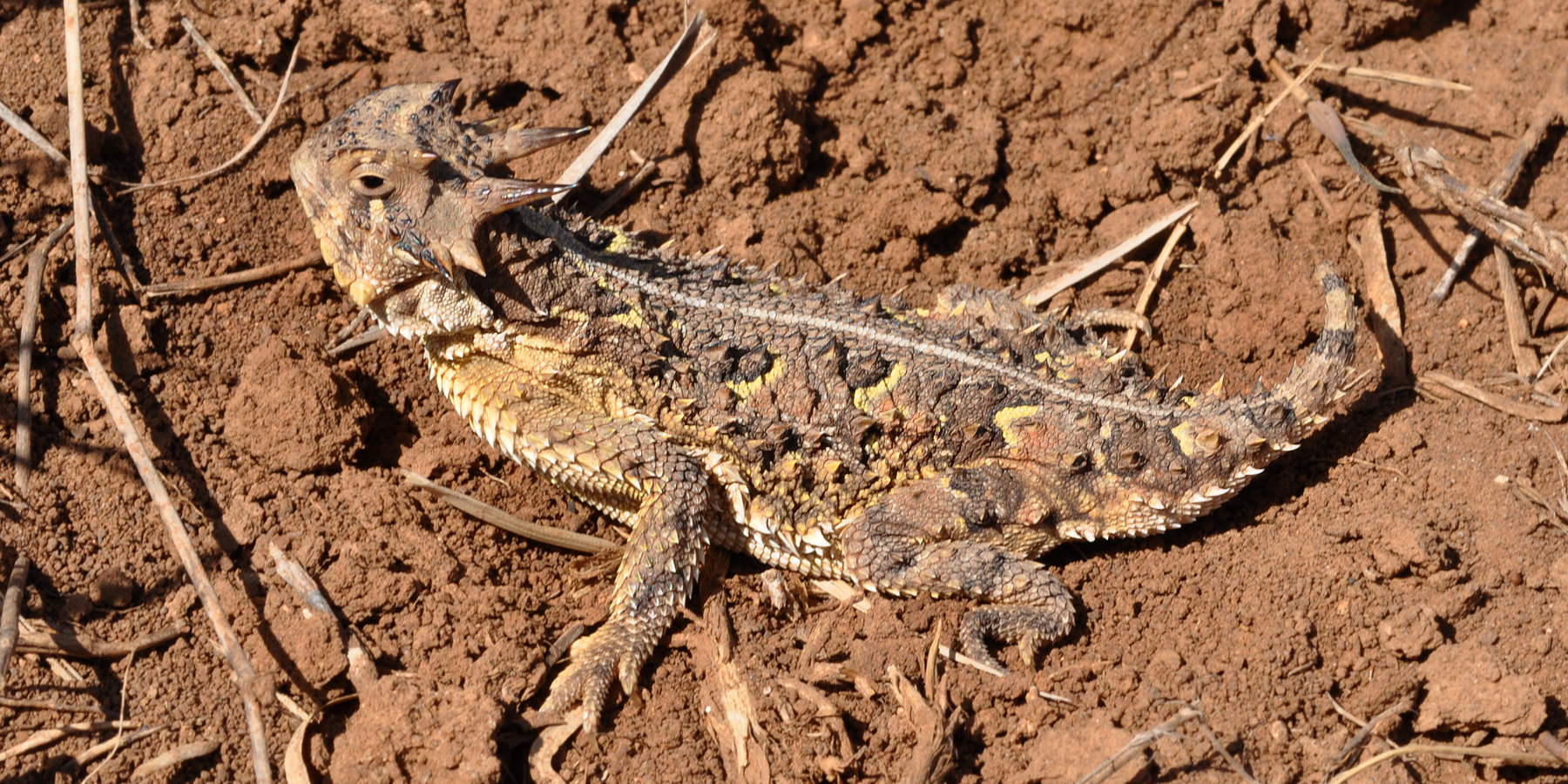
- Texas horned lizard (Phrynosoma cornutum) - introduced

=== Leiocephalidae ===
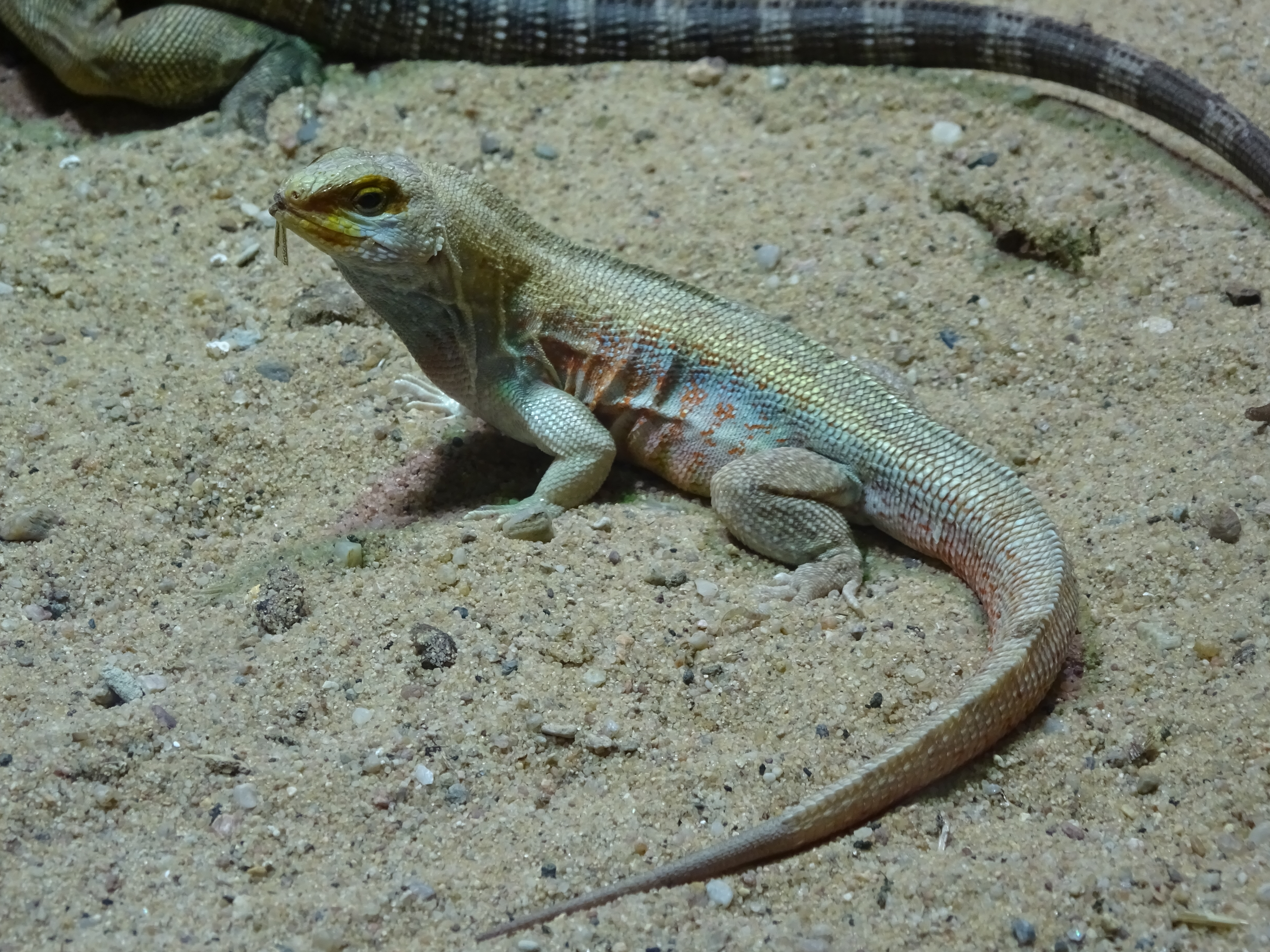
- Hispaniolan curlytail lizard (Leiocephalus schreibersii) - introduced
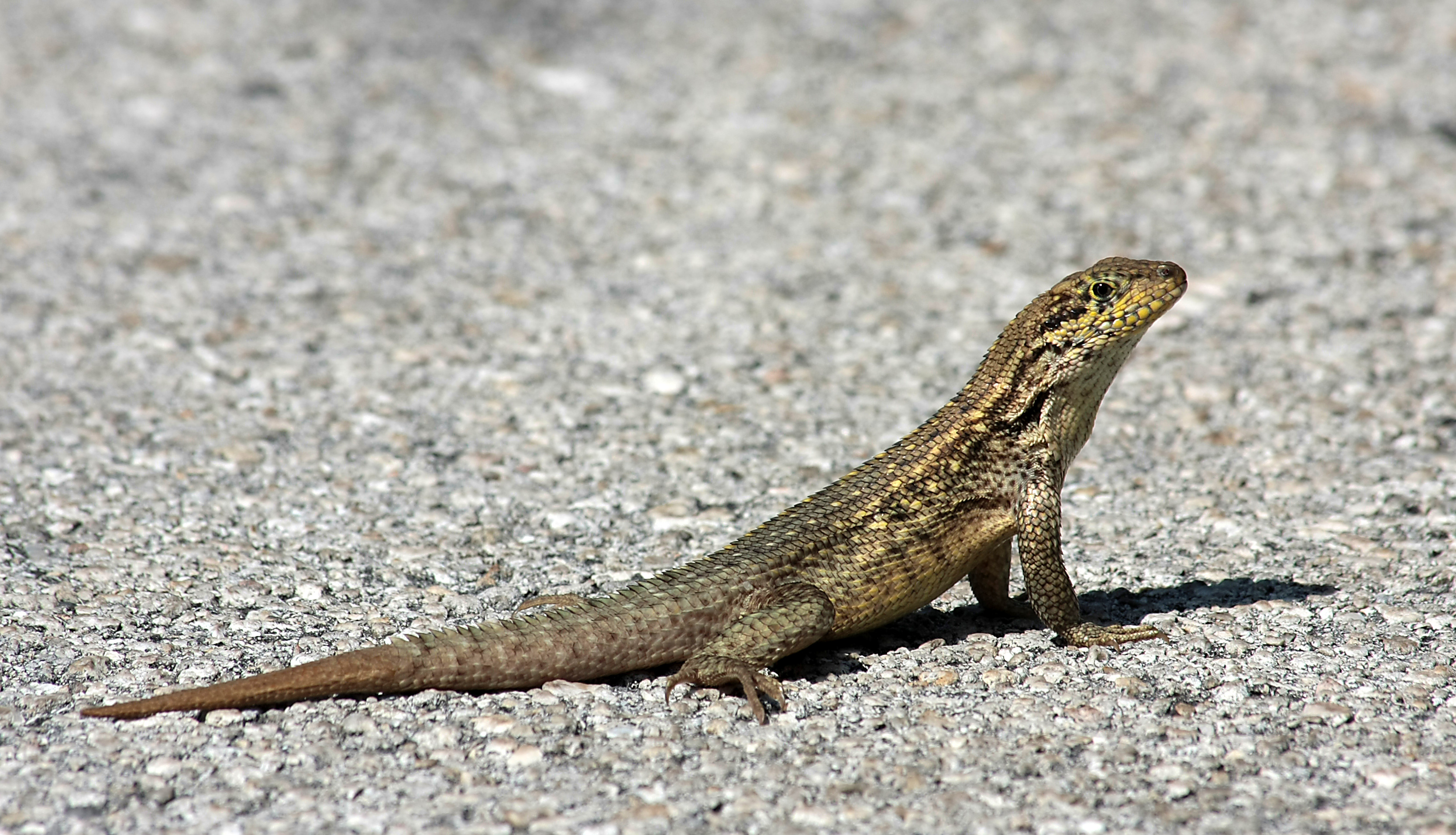
- Northern curly-tailed lizard (Leiocephalus carinatus) - introduced

=== Agamidae ===
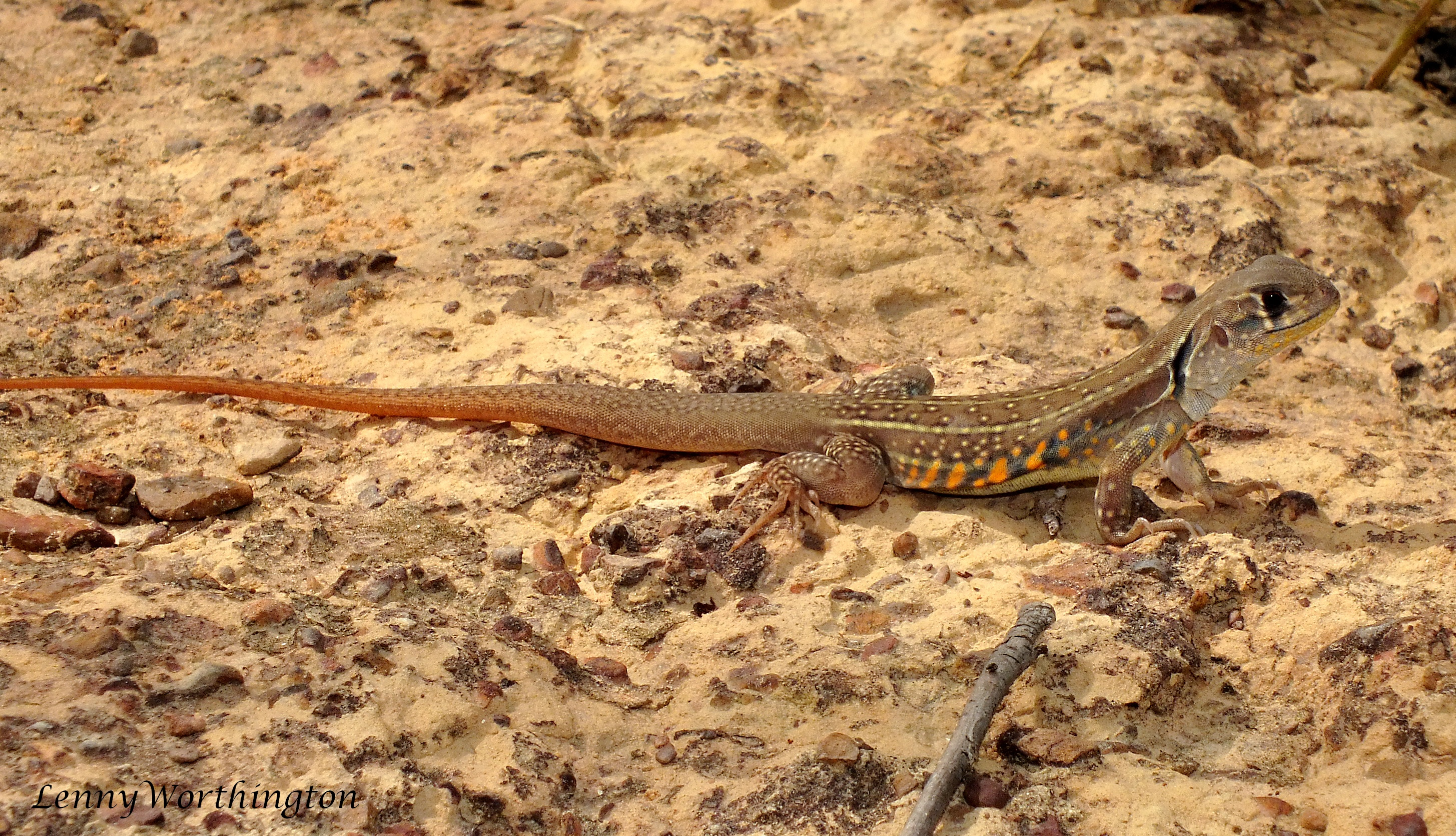
- Butterfly lizard (Leiolepis belliana) - introduced
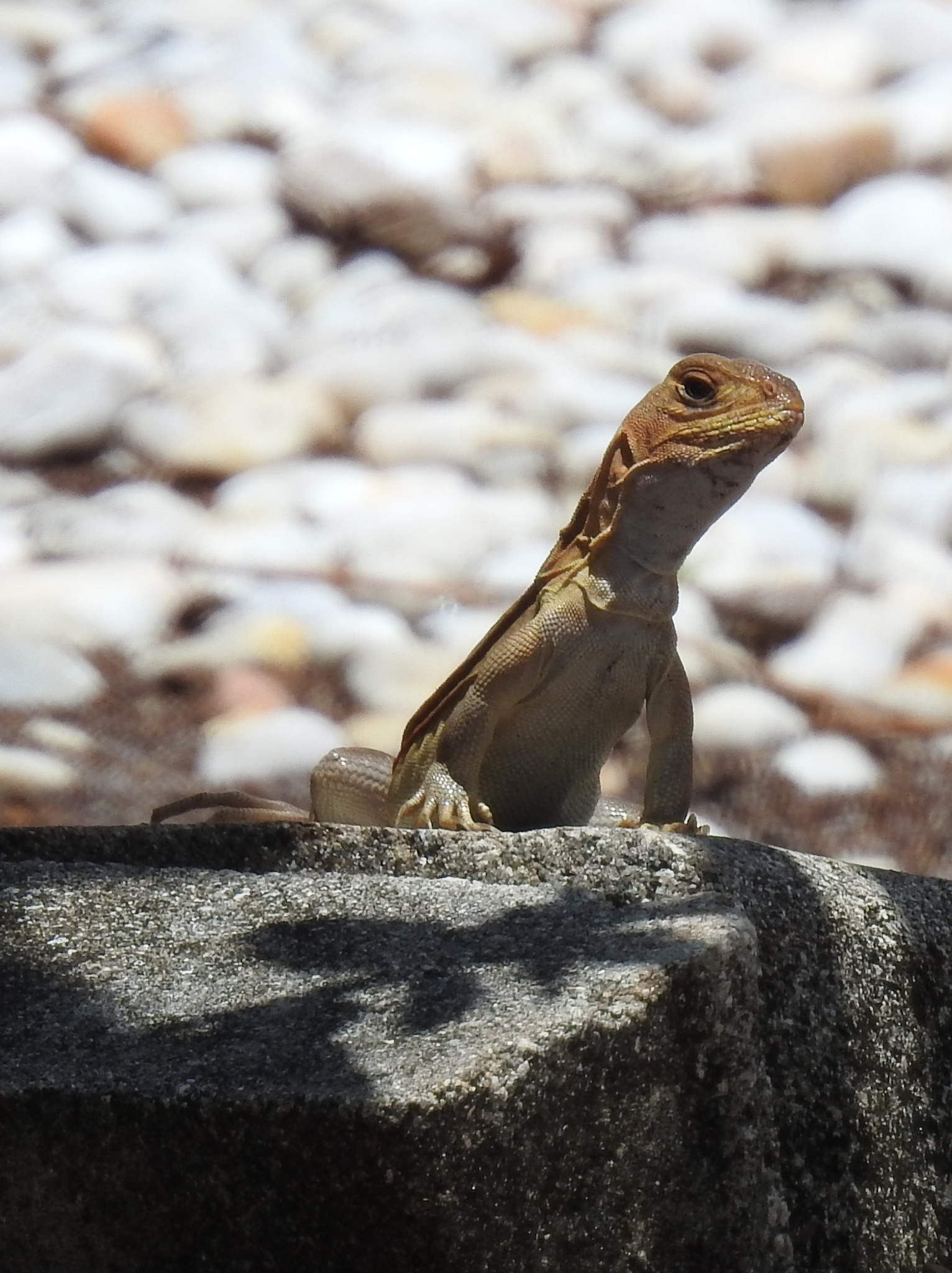
- Red-banded butterfly lizard (Leiolepis rubritaeniata) - introduced
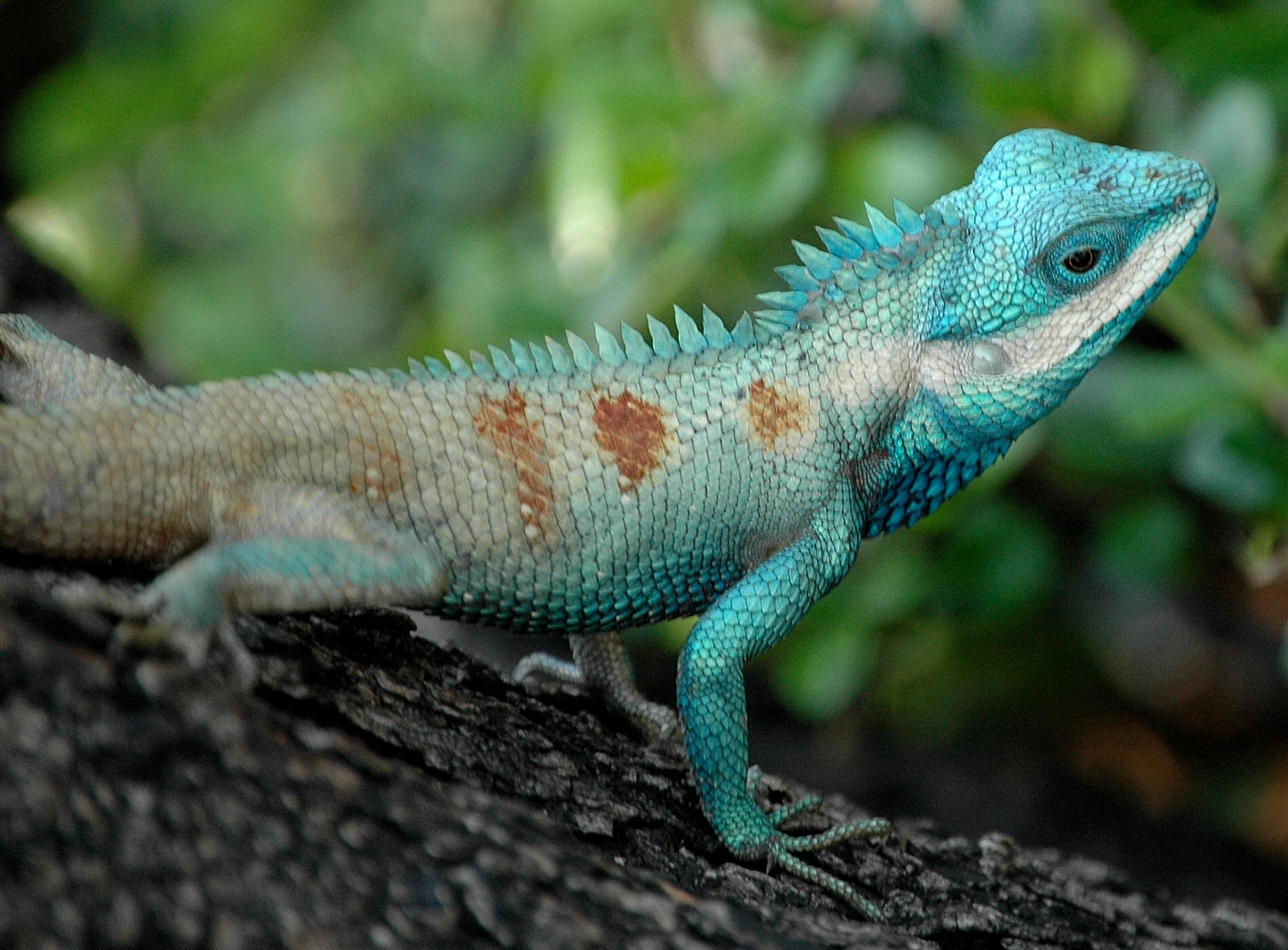
- Indo-Chinese forest lizard (Calotes mystaceus) - introduced
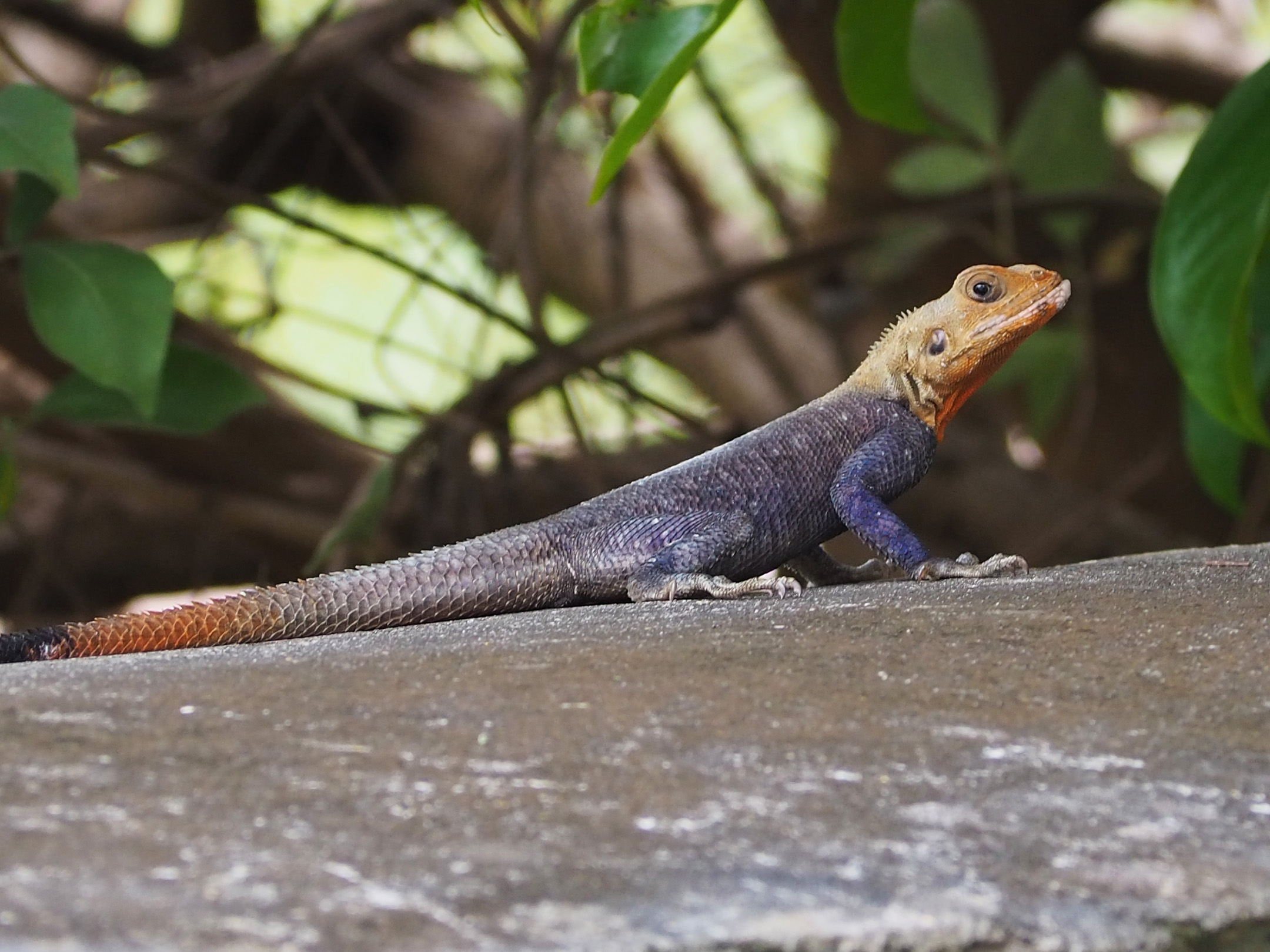
- Peter's rock agama (Agama picticauda) - introduced
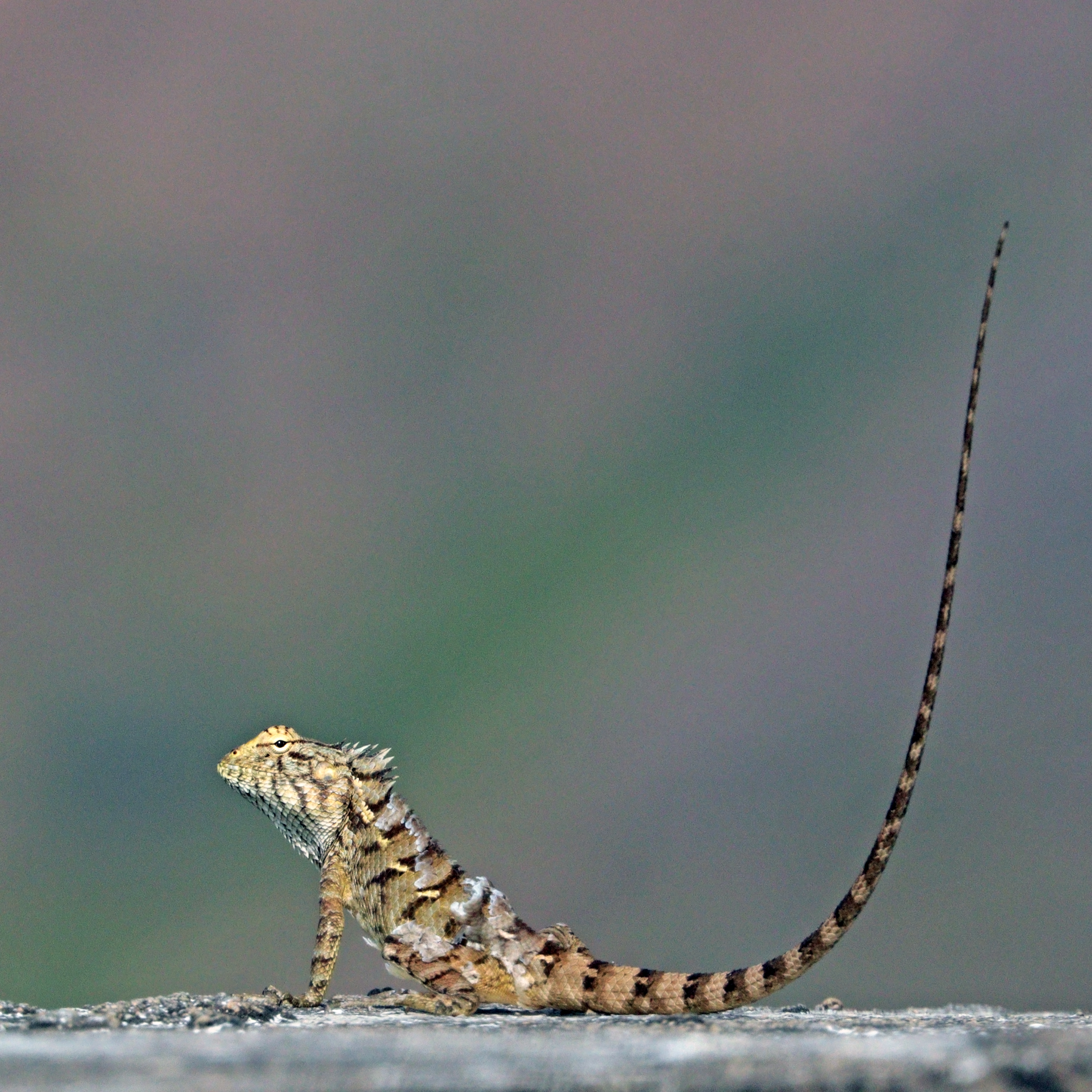
- Oriental garden lizard (Calotes versicolor) - introduced

=== Dactyloidae ===
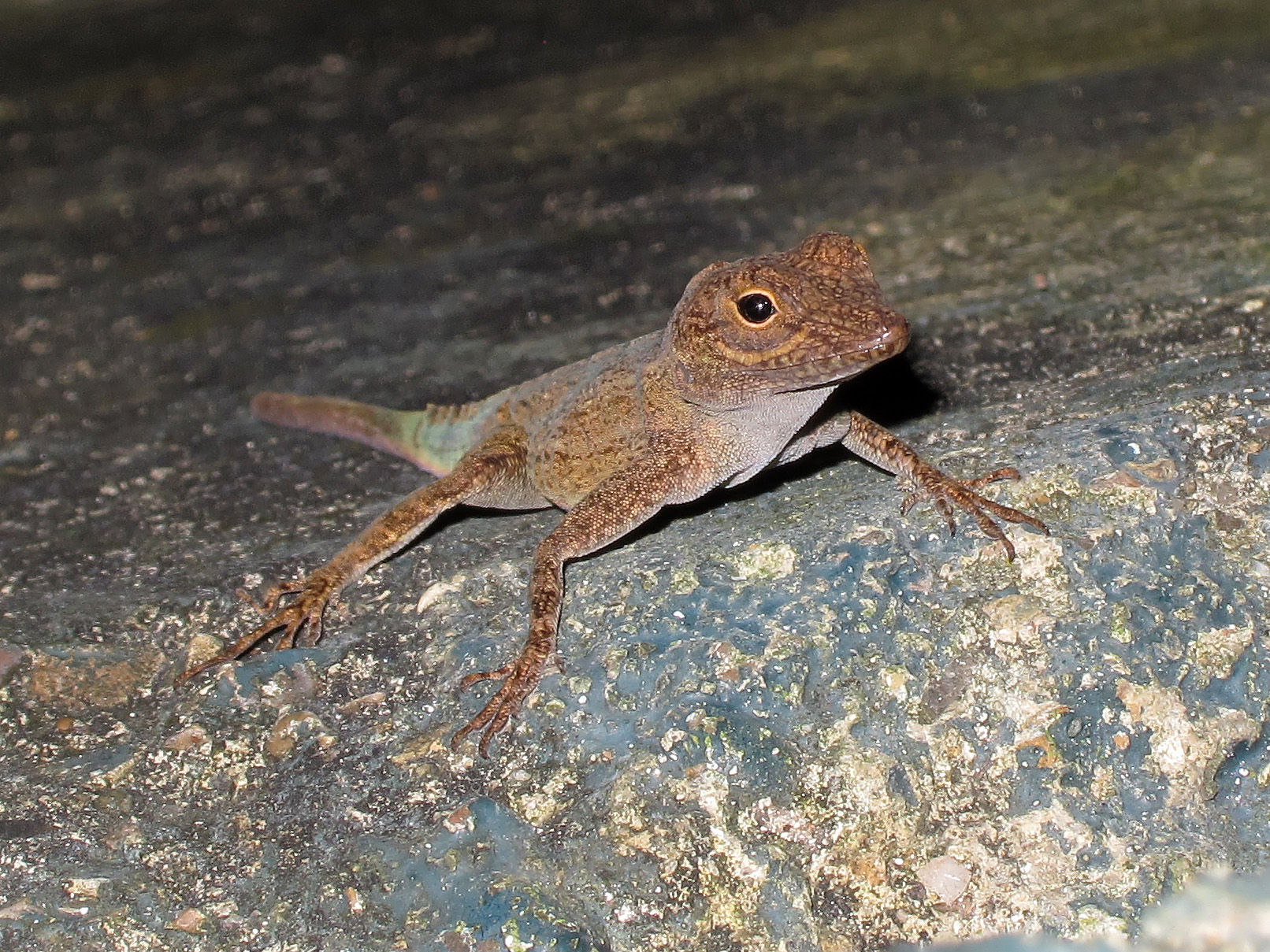
- Bark anole (Anolis distichus) - introduced
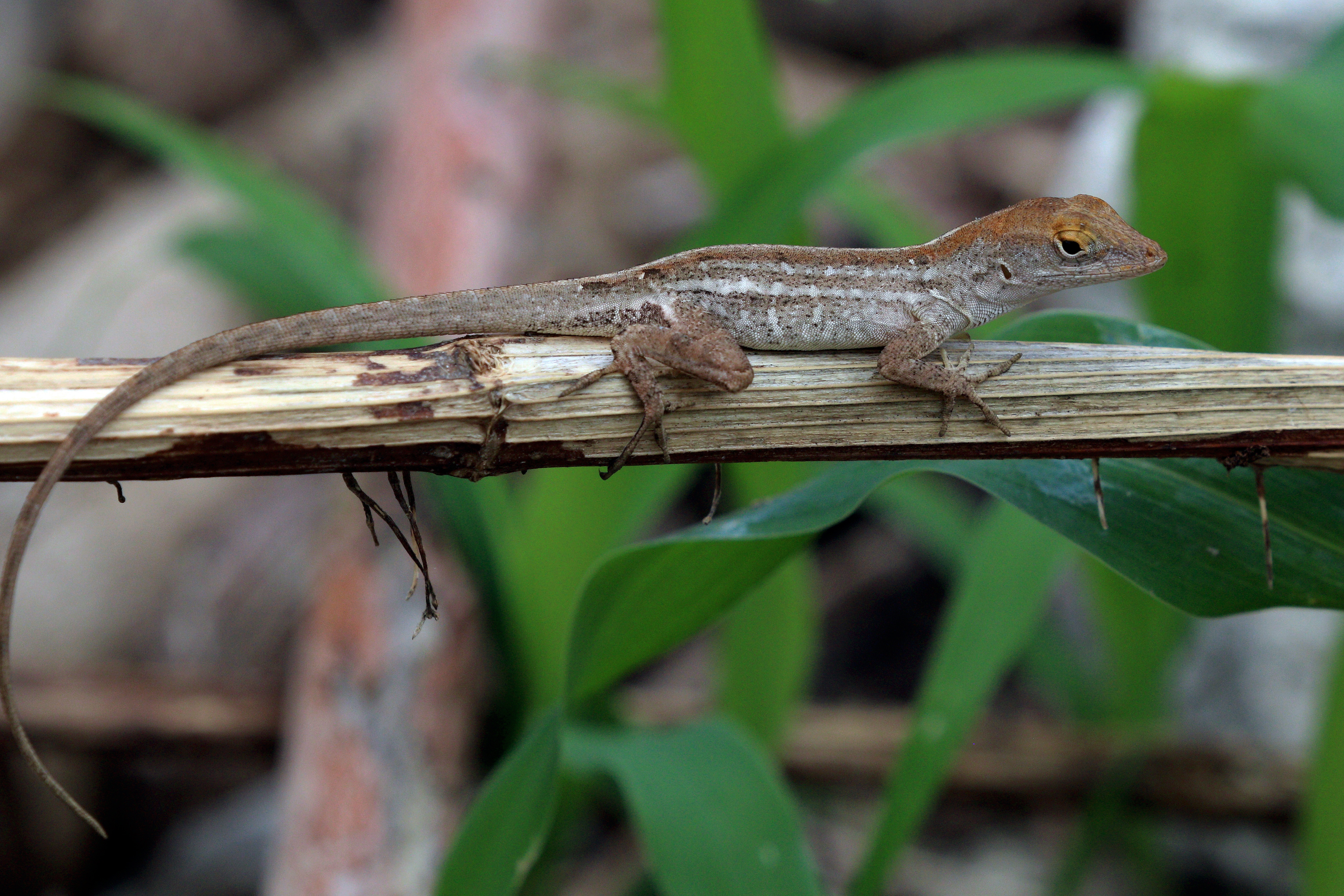
- Brown anole (Anolis sagrei) - introduced
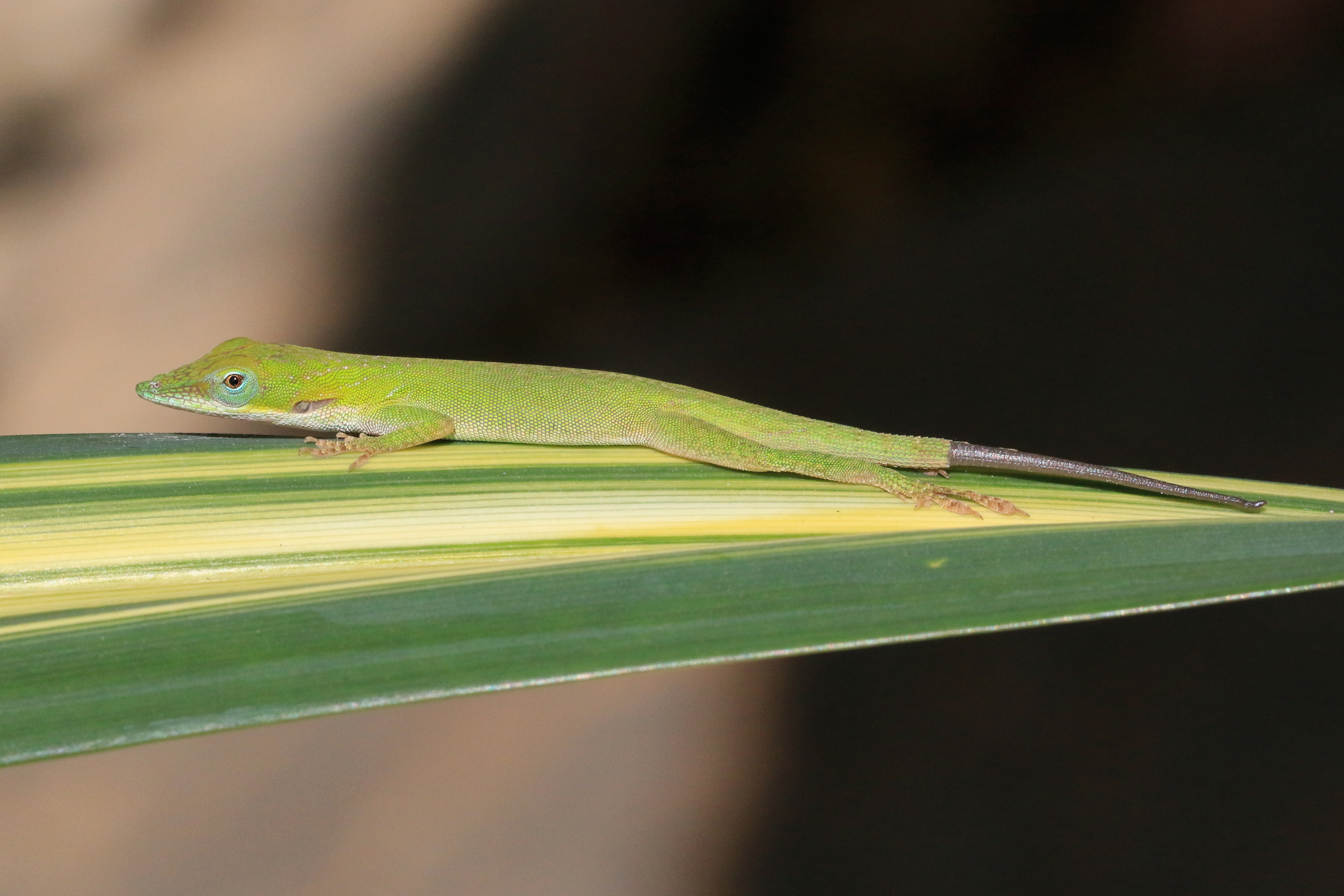
- Cuban green anole (Anolis porcatus) - introduced
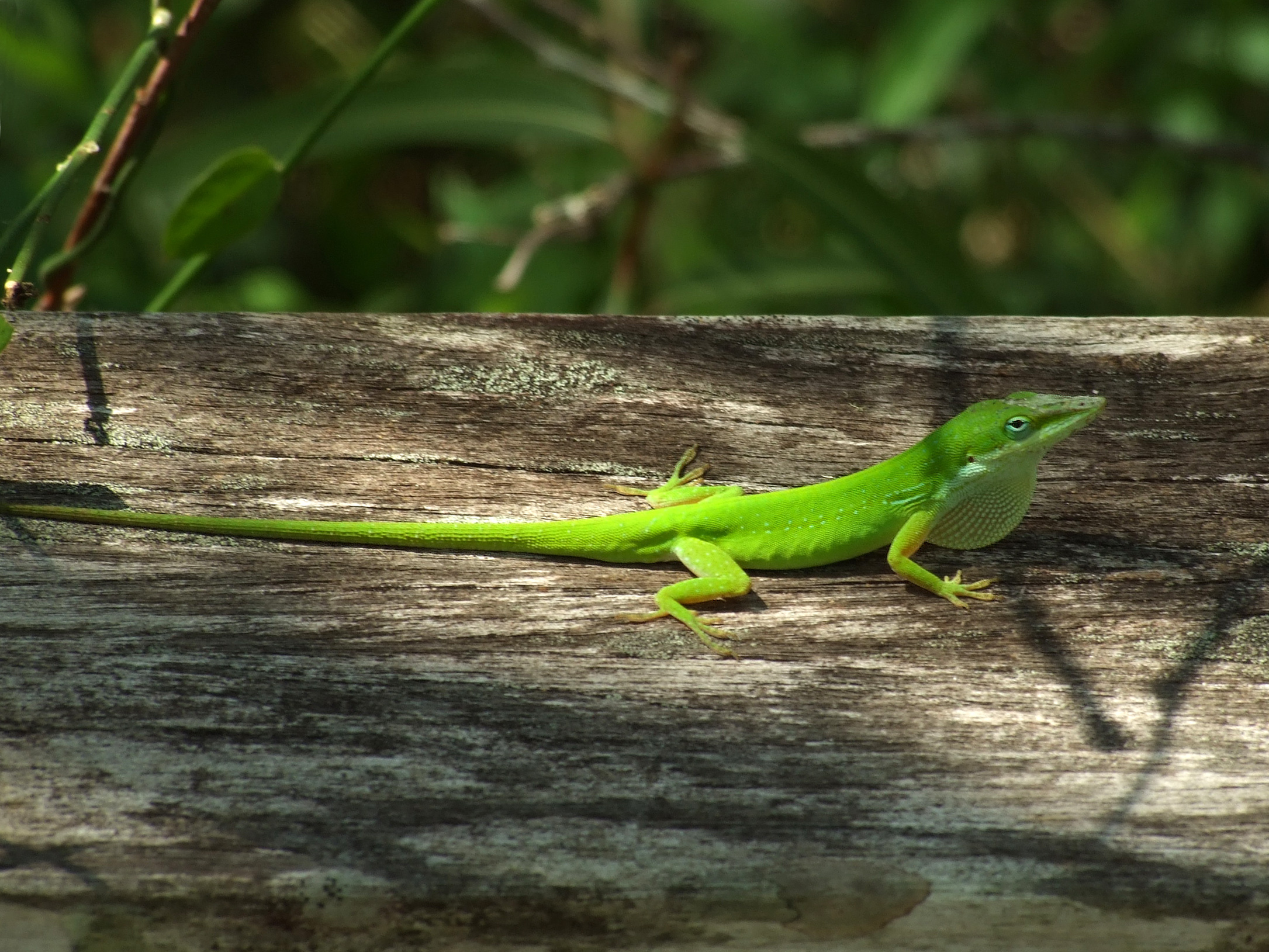
- Green anole (Anolis carolinensis)
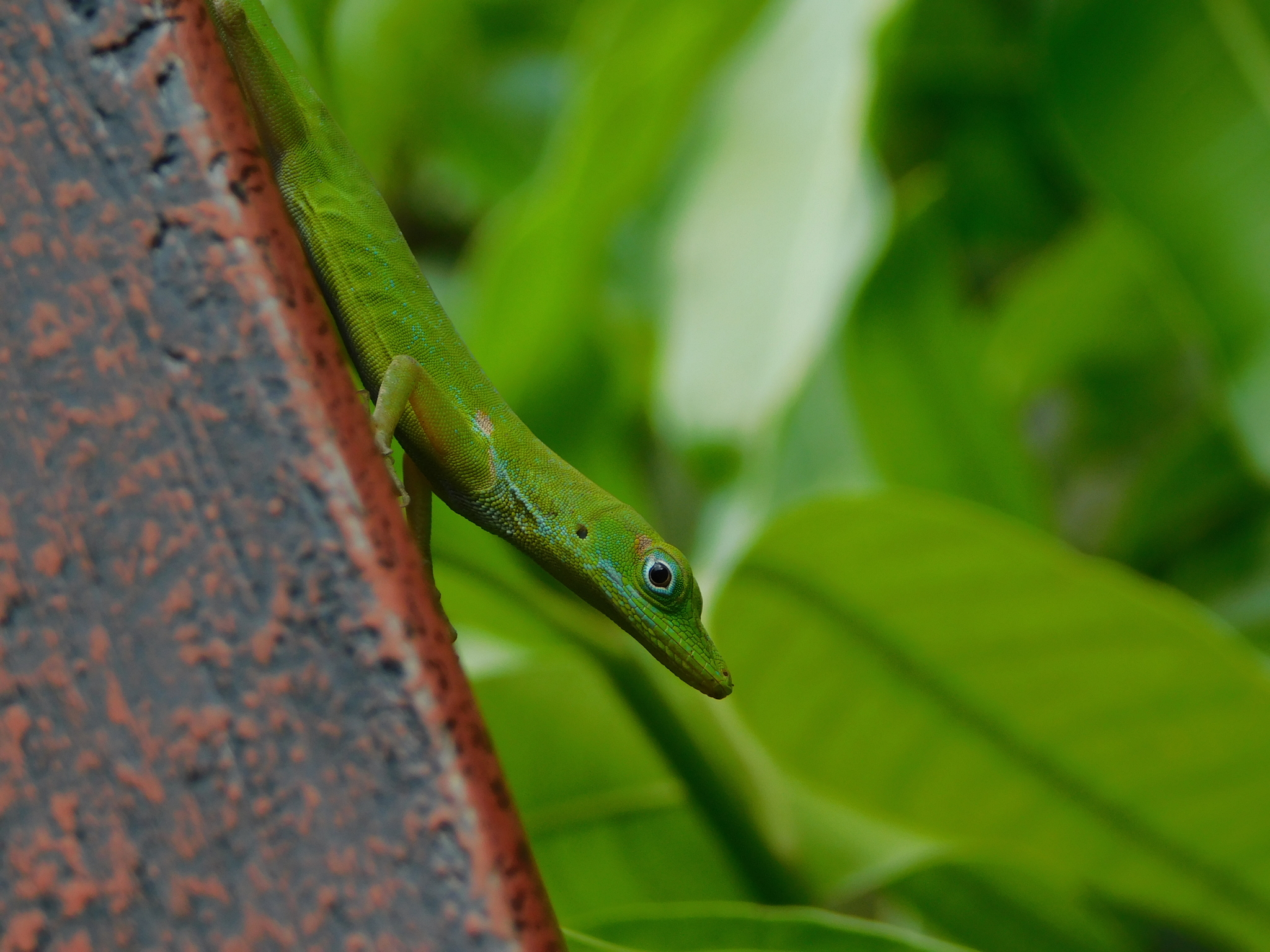
- Hispaniolan green anole (Anolis chlorocyanus) - introduced
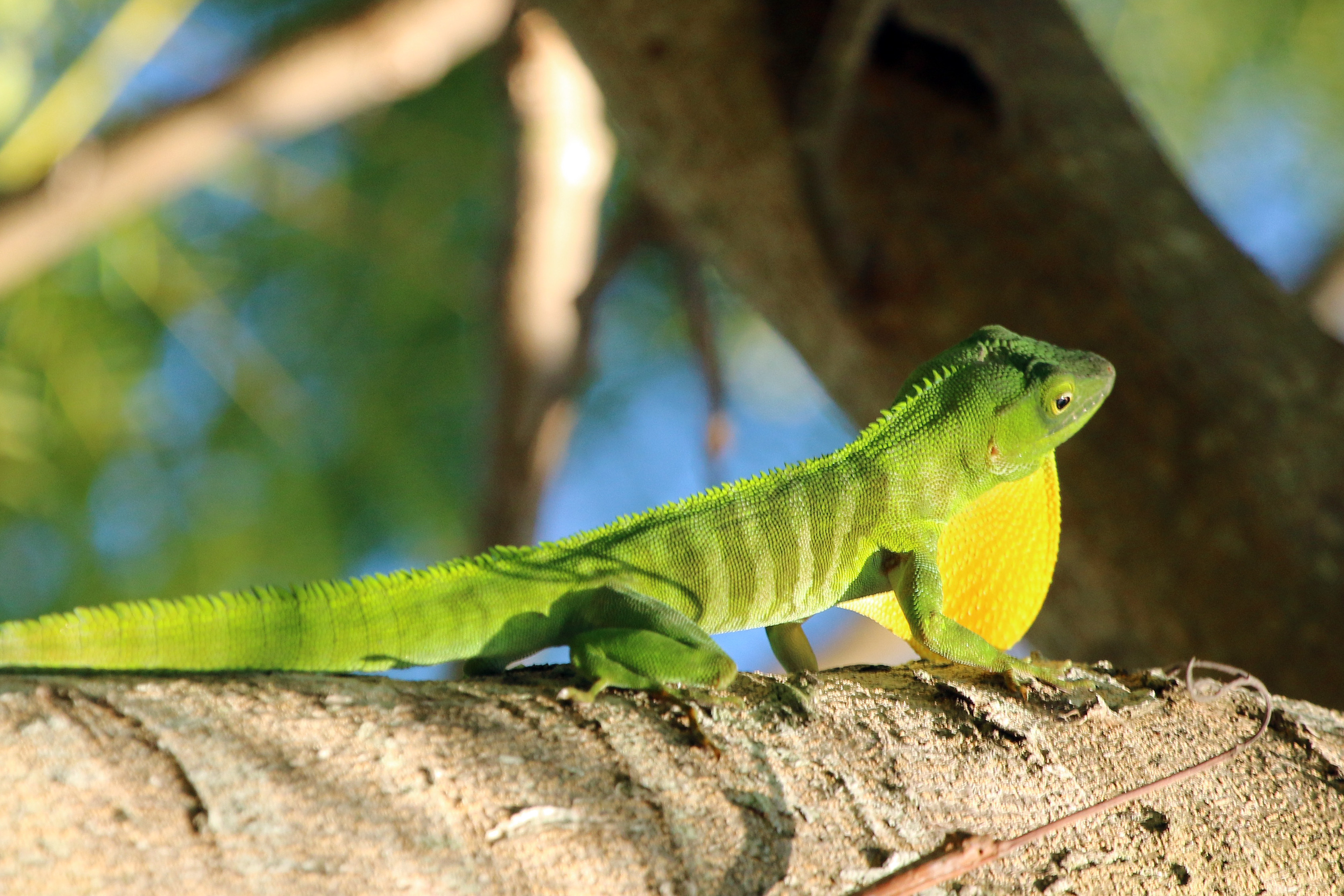
- Jamaican giant anole (Anolis garmani) - introduced
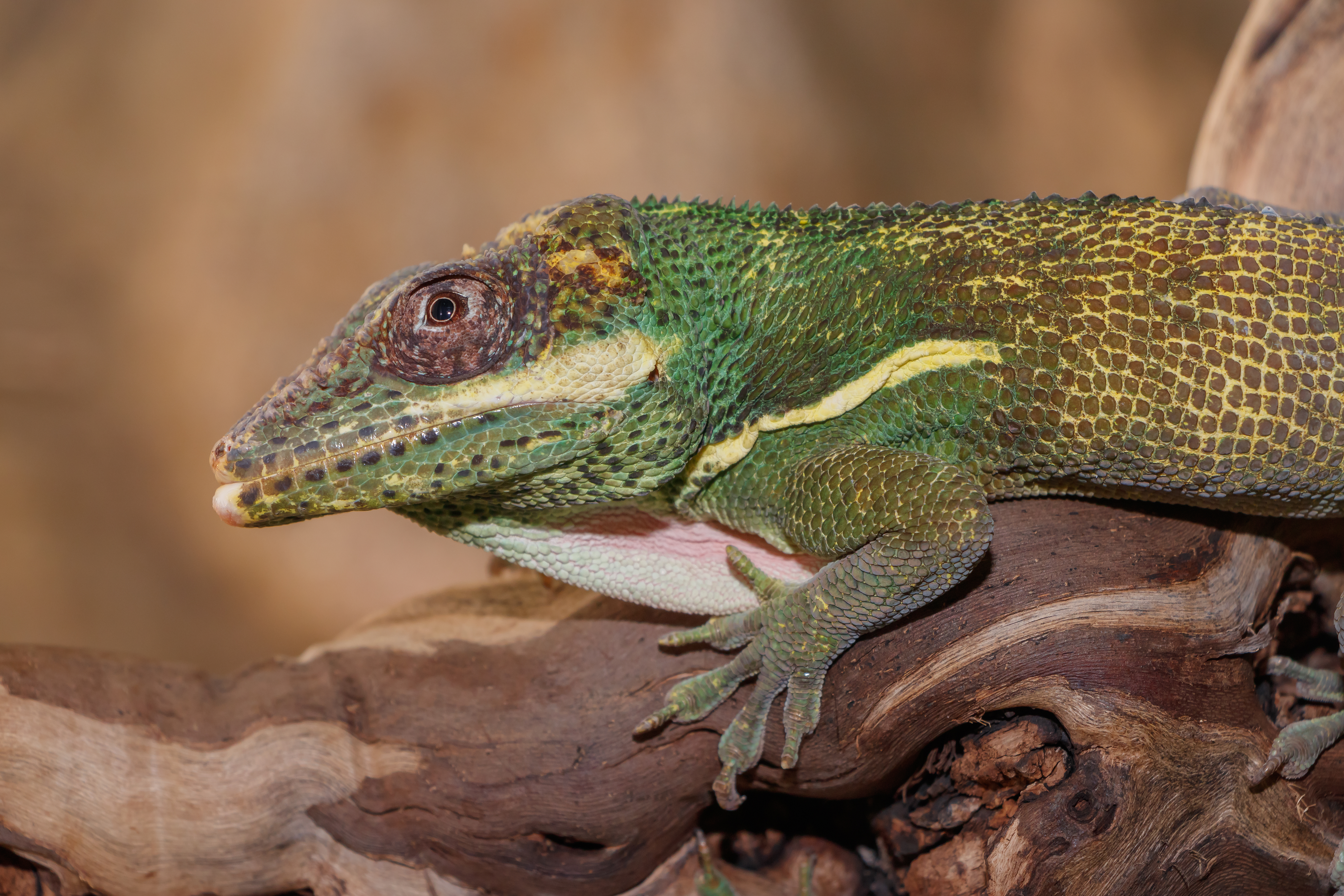
- Knight anole - introduced (Anolis equestris)
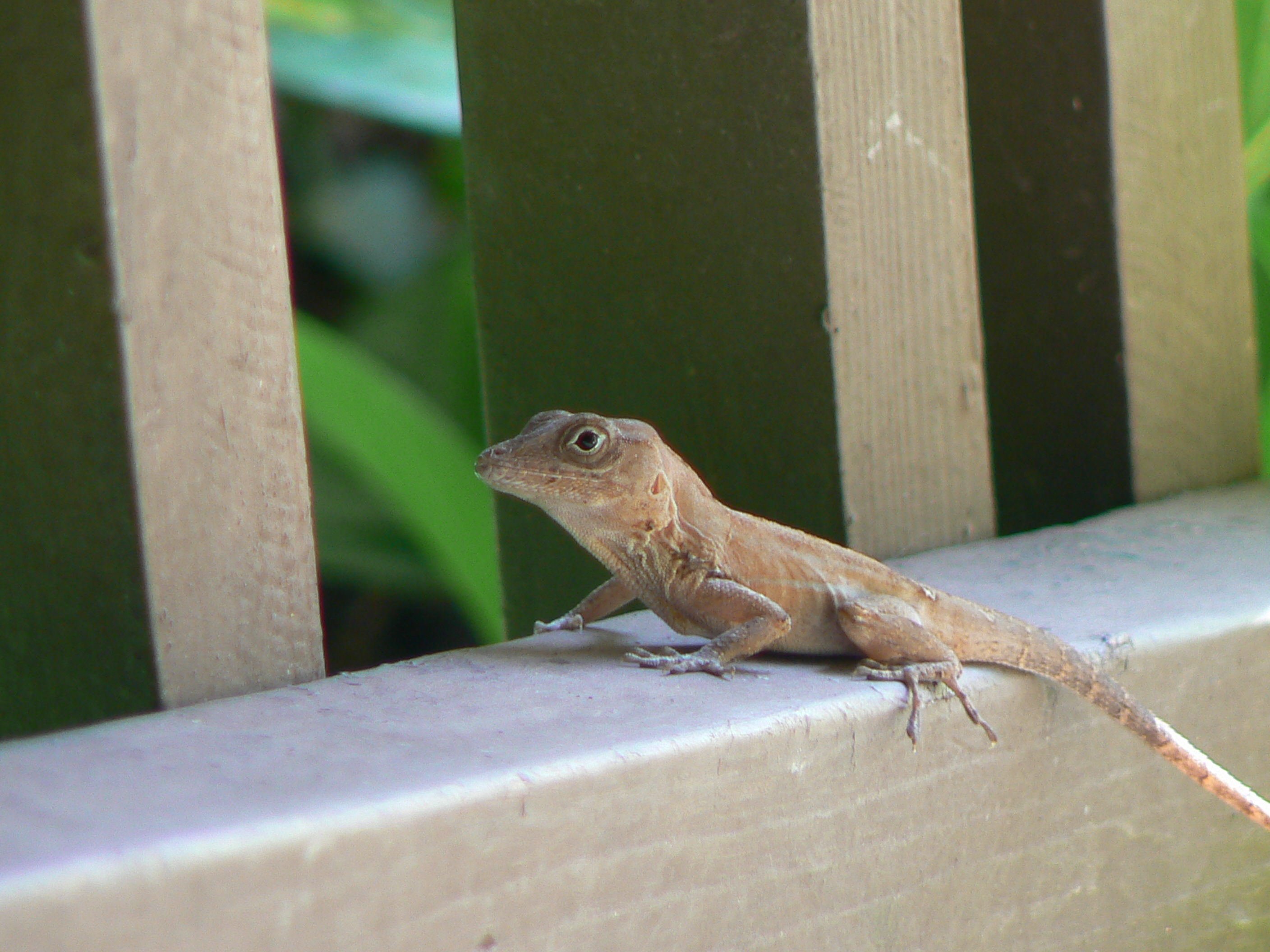
- Large-headed anole (Anolis cybotes) - introduced
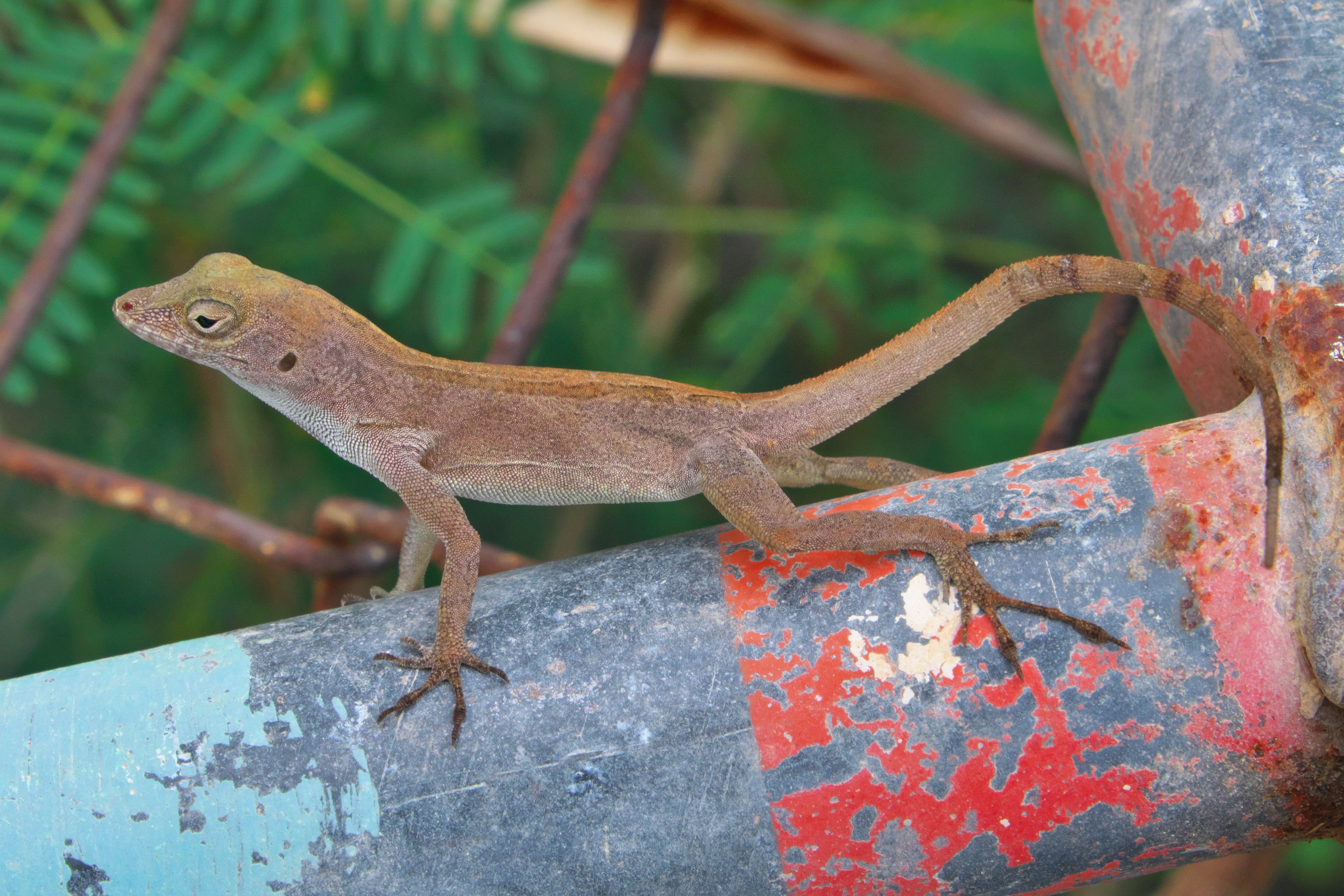
- Puerto Rican crested anole (Anolis cristatellus) - introduced
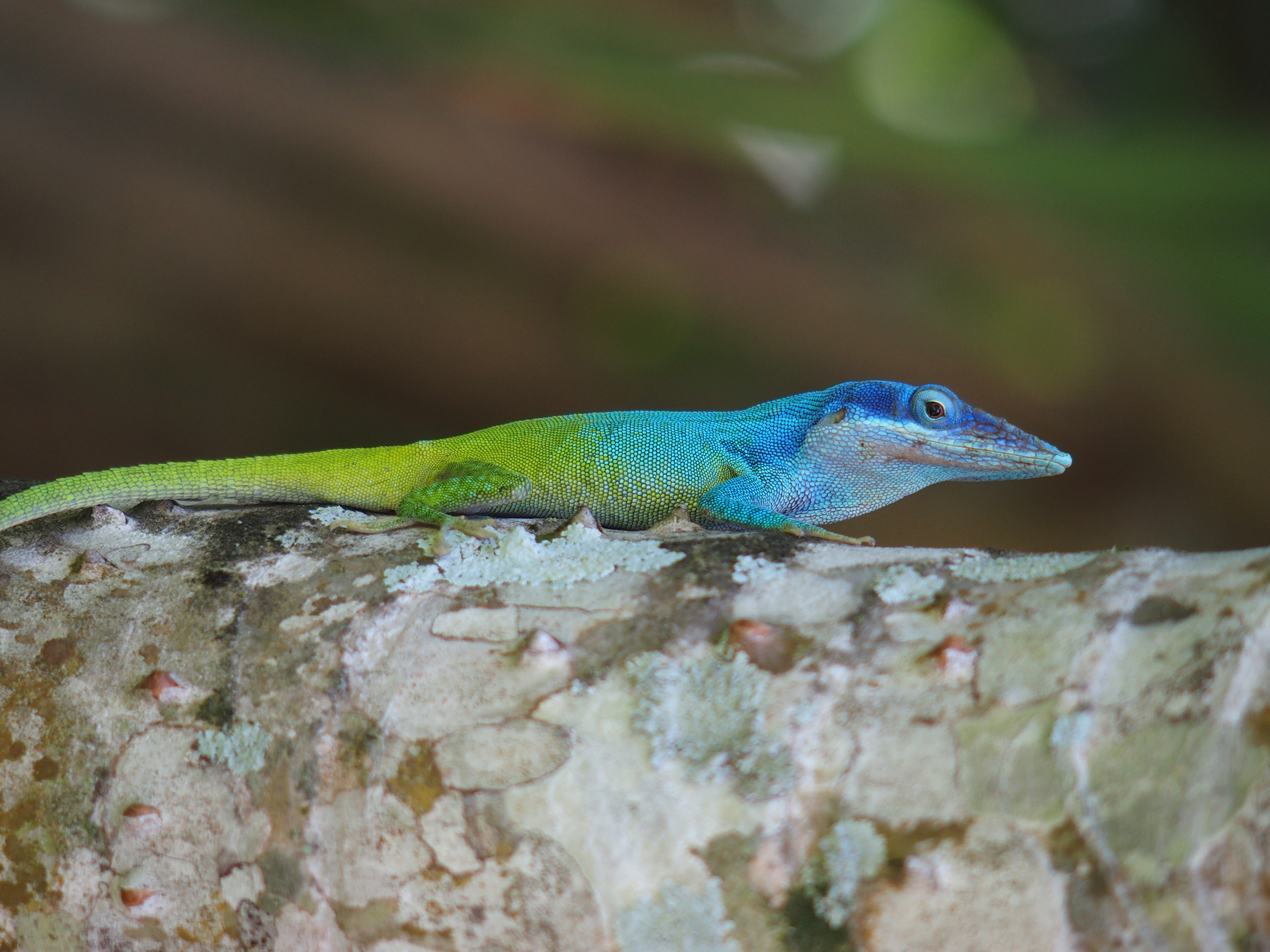
- Allison's anole (Anolis allisoni) - introduced

=== Iguanidae ===
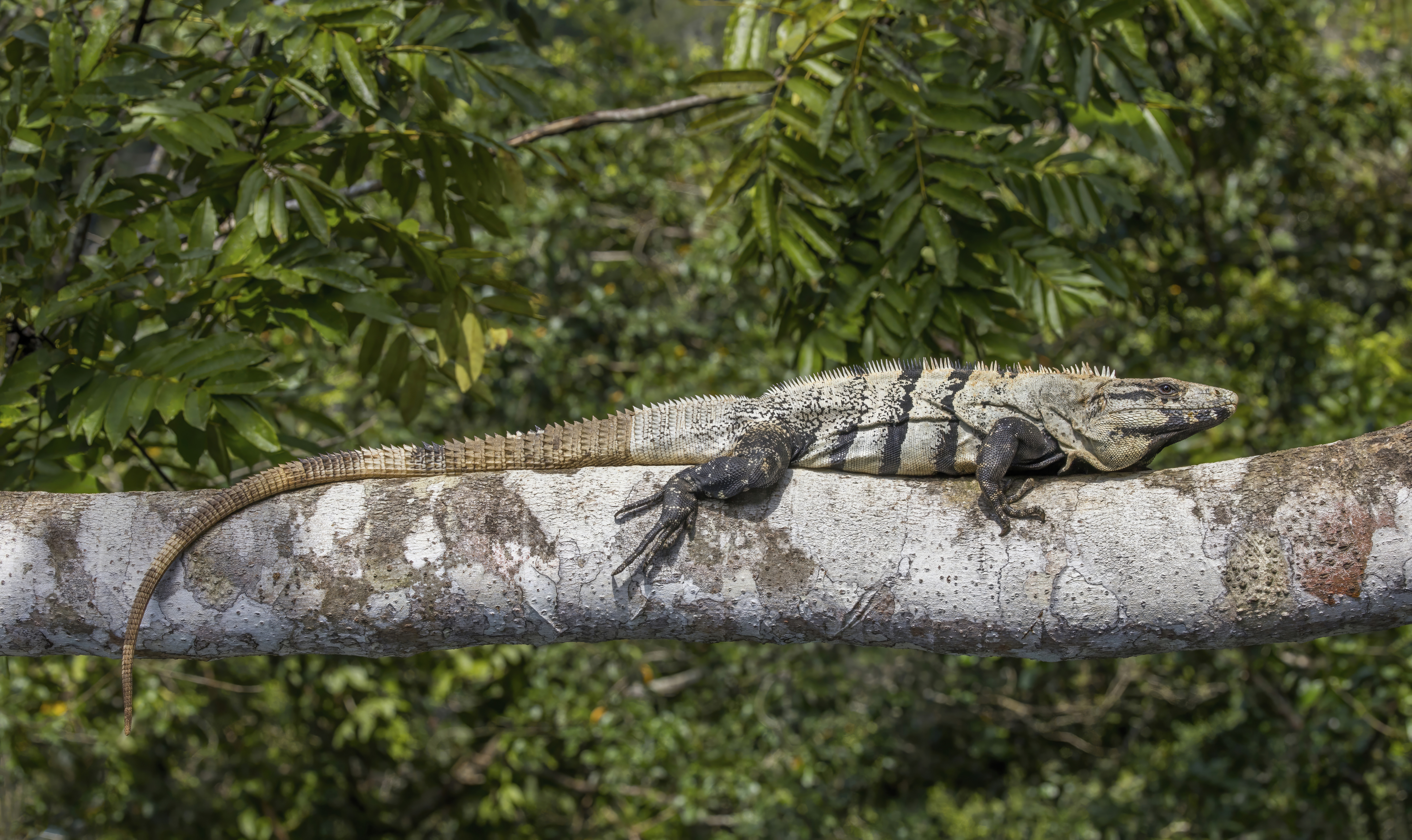
- Black spiny-tailed iguana (Ctenosaura similis) - introduced
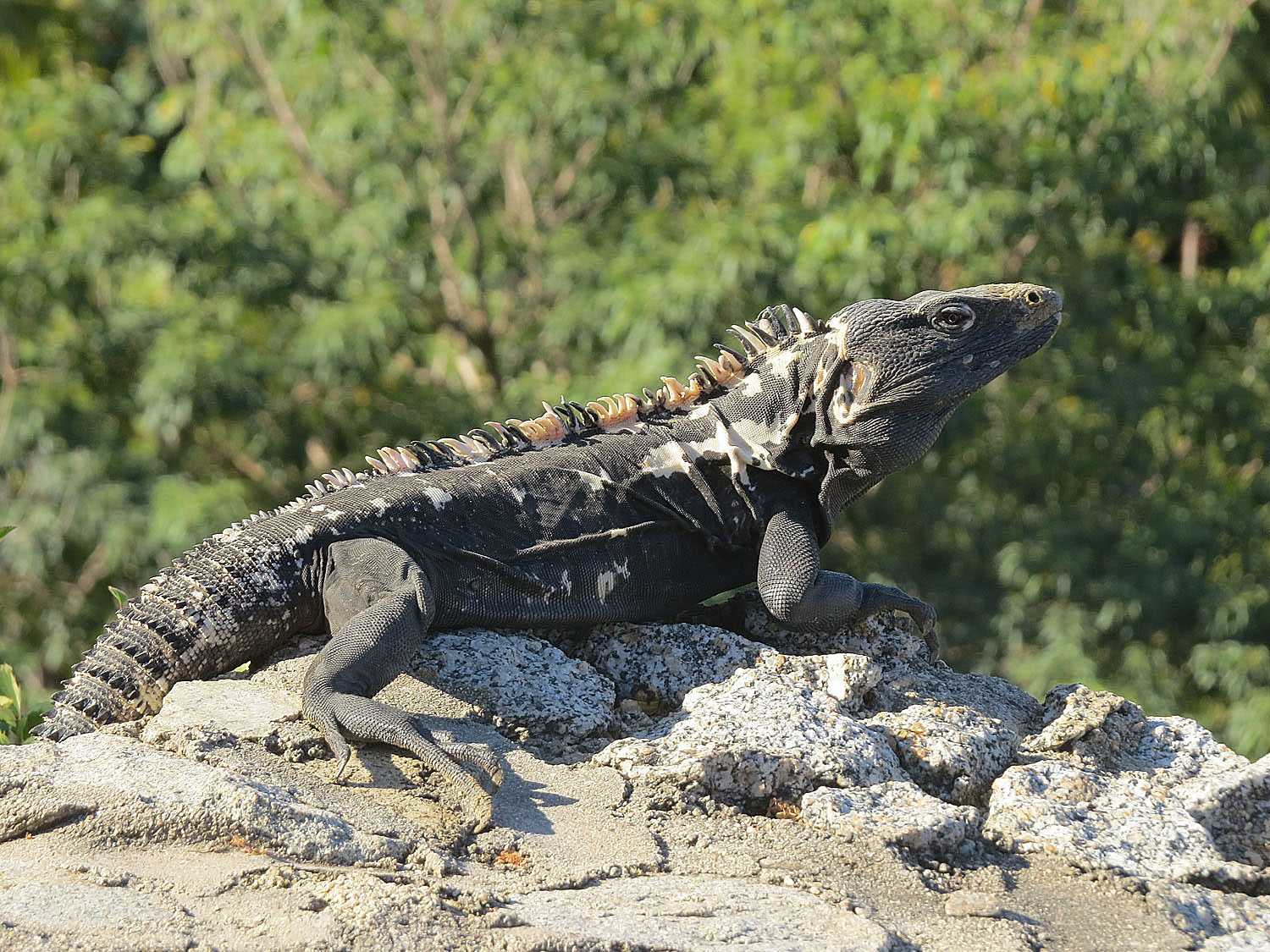
- Western spiny-tailed iguana (Ctenosaura pectinata) - introduced
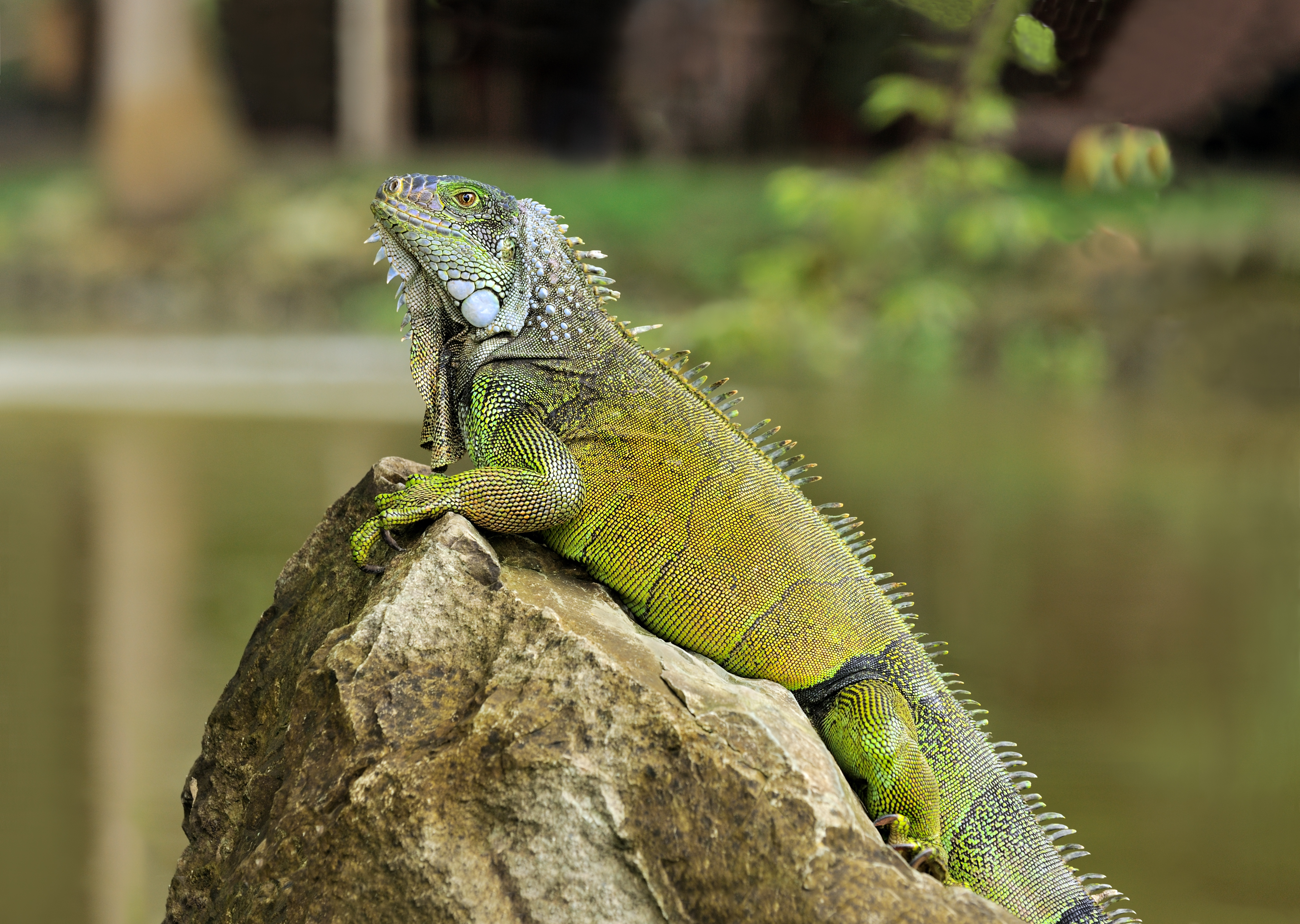
- Green iguana (Iguana iguana) - introduced

=== Corytophanidae ===
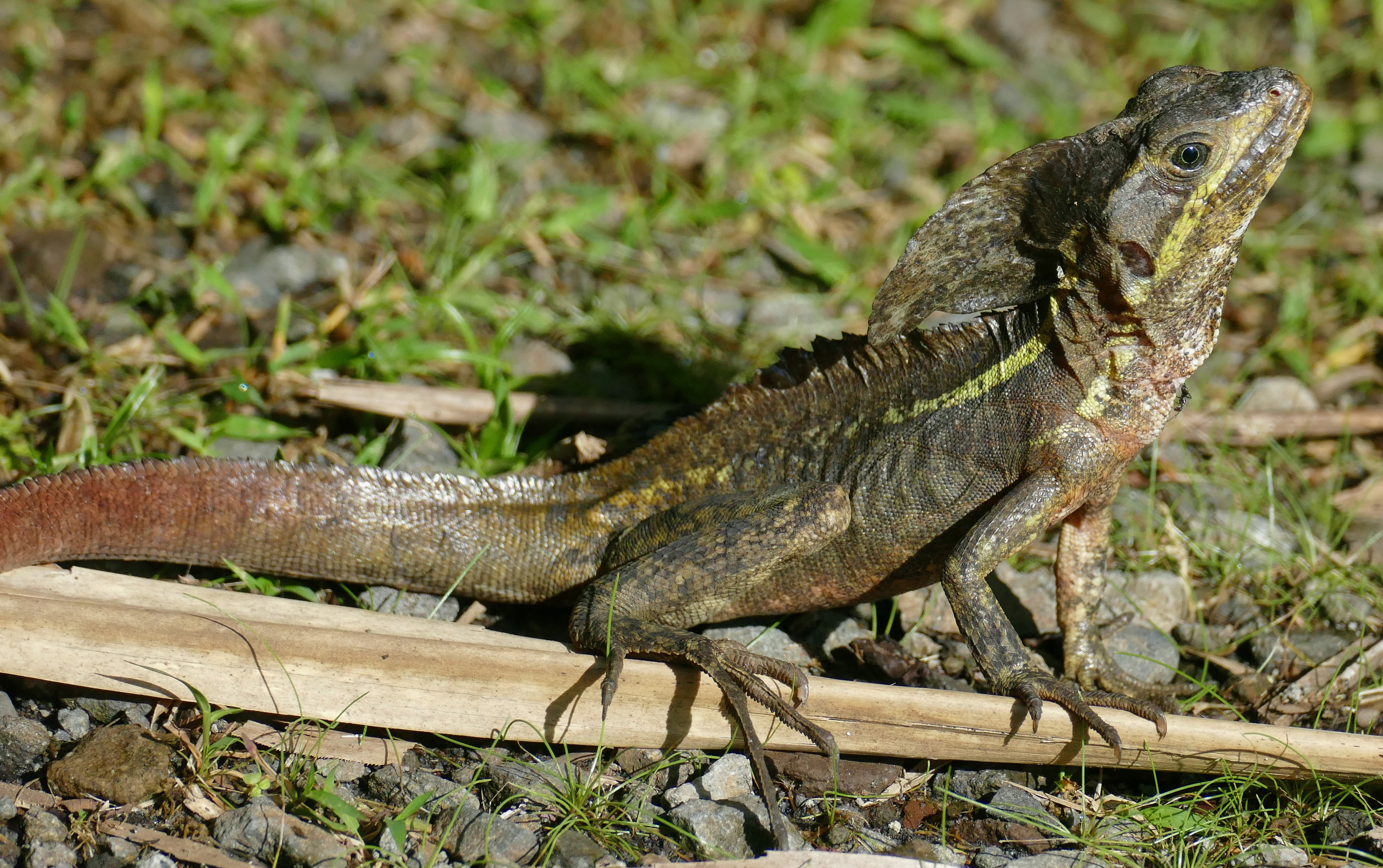
- Brown basilisk (Basiliscus vittatus) - introduced

=== Chamaeleonidae ===
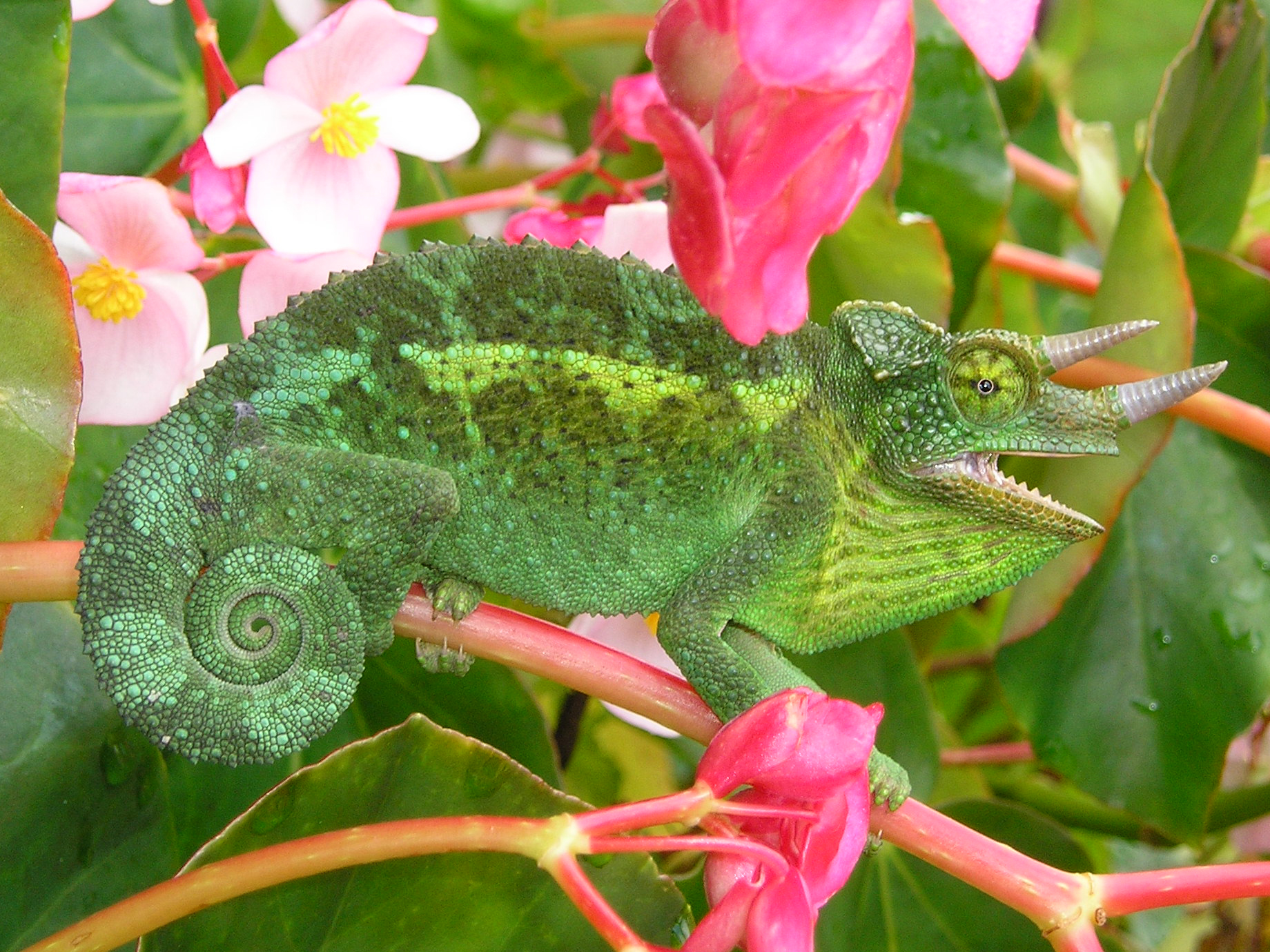
- Jackson's chameleon (Trioceros jacksonii) - introduced
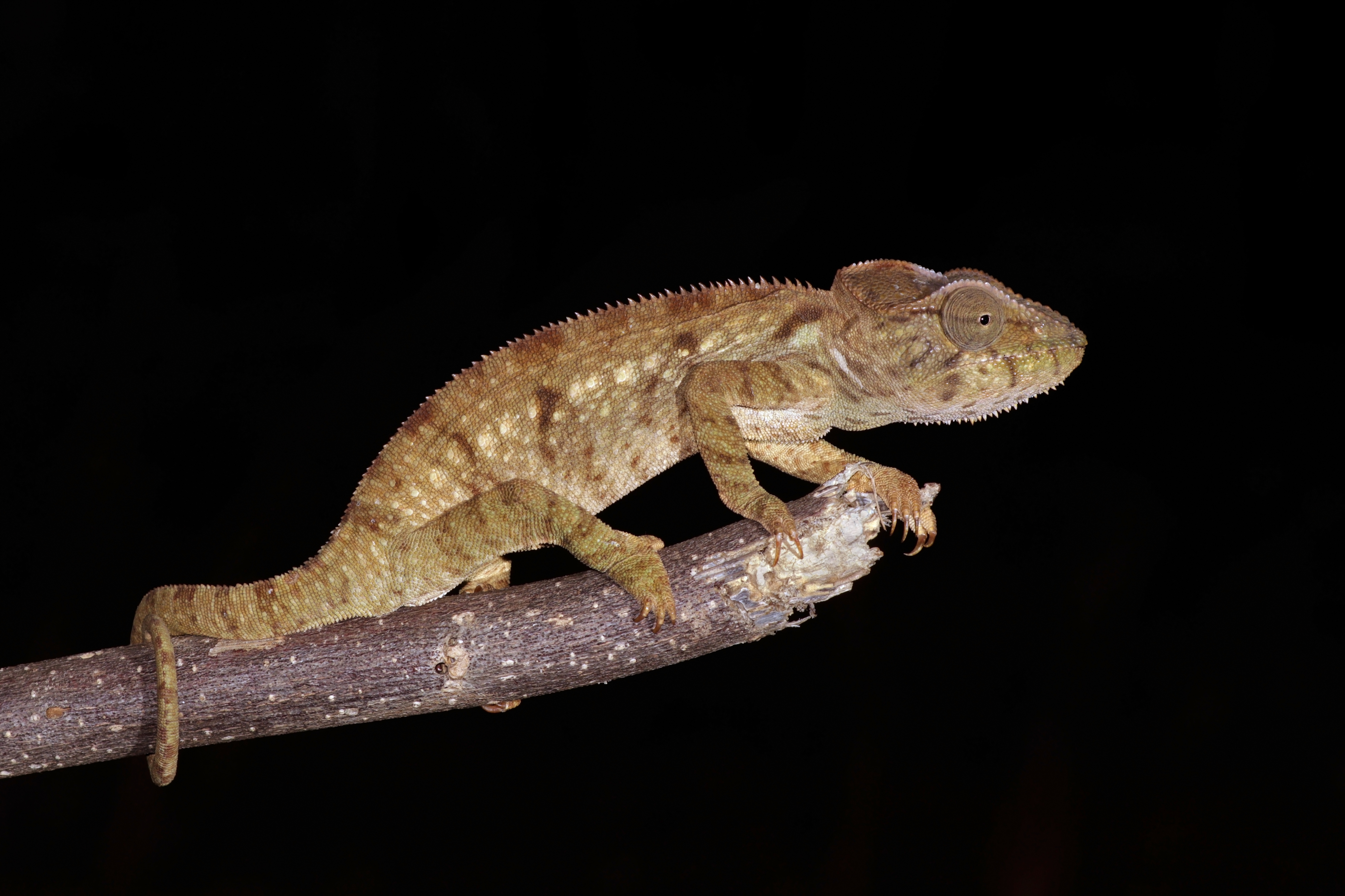
- Oustalet's chameleon (Furcifer oustaleti)- introduced
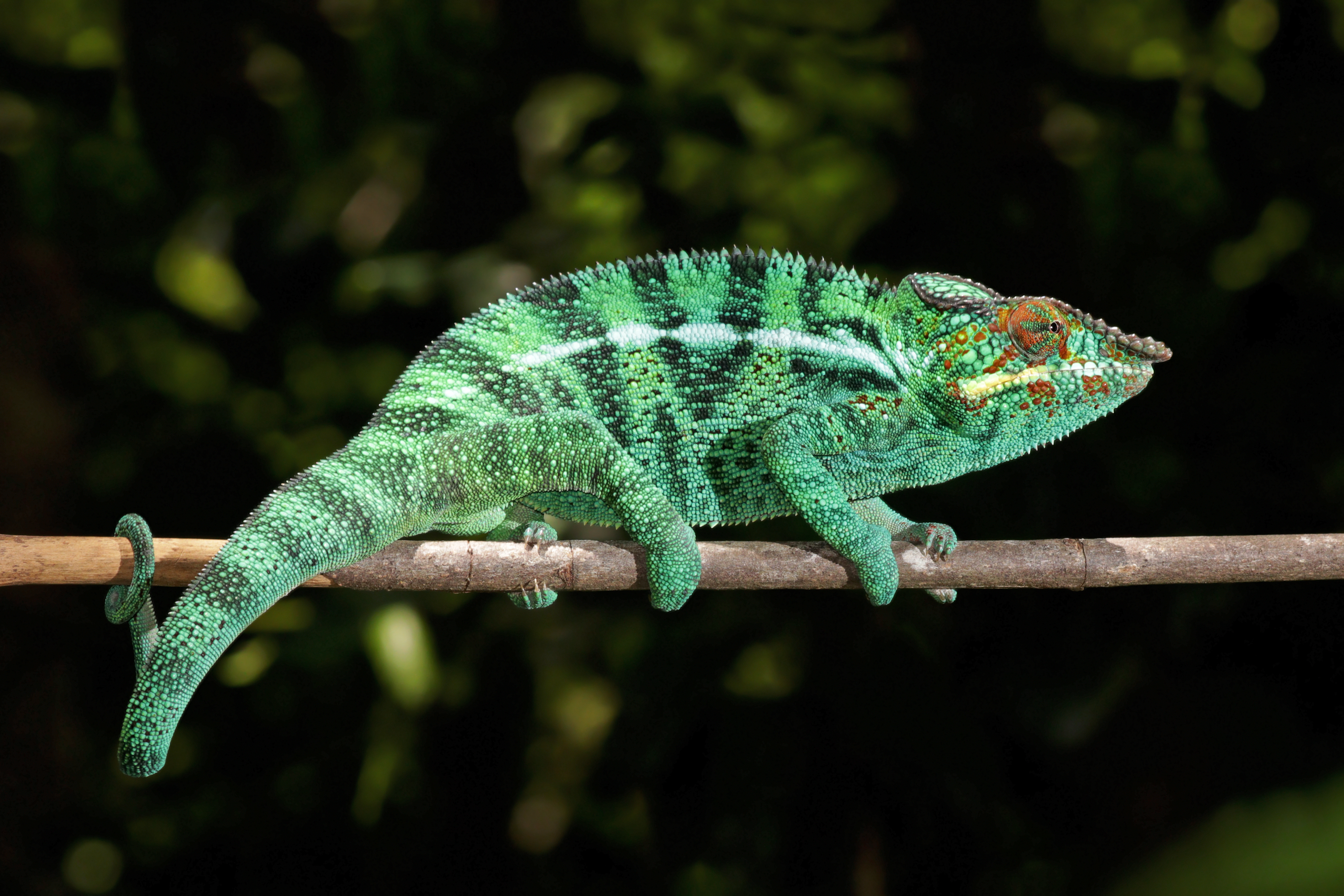
- Panther chameleon (Furcifer pardalis) - introduced
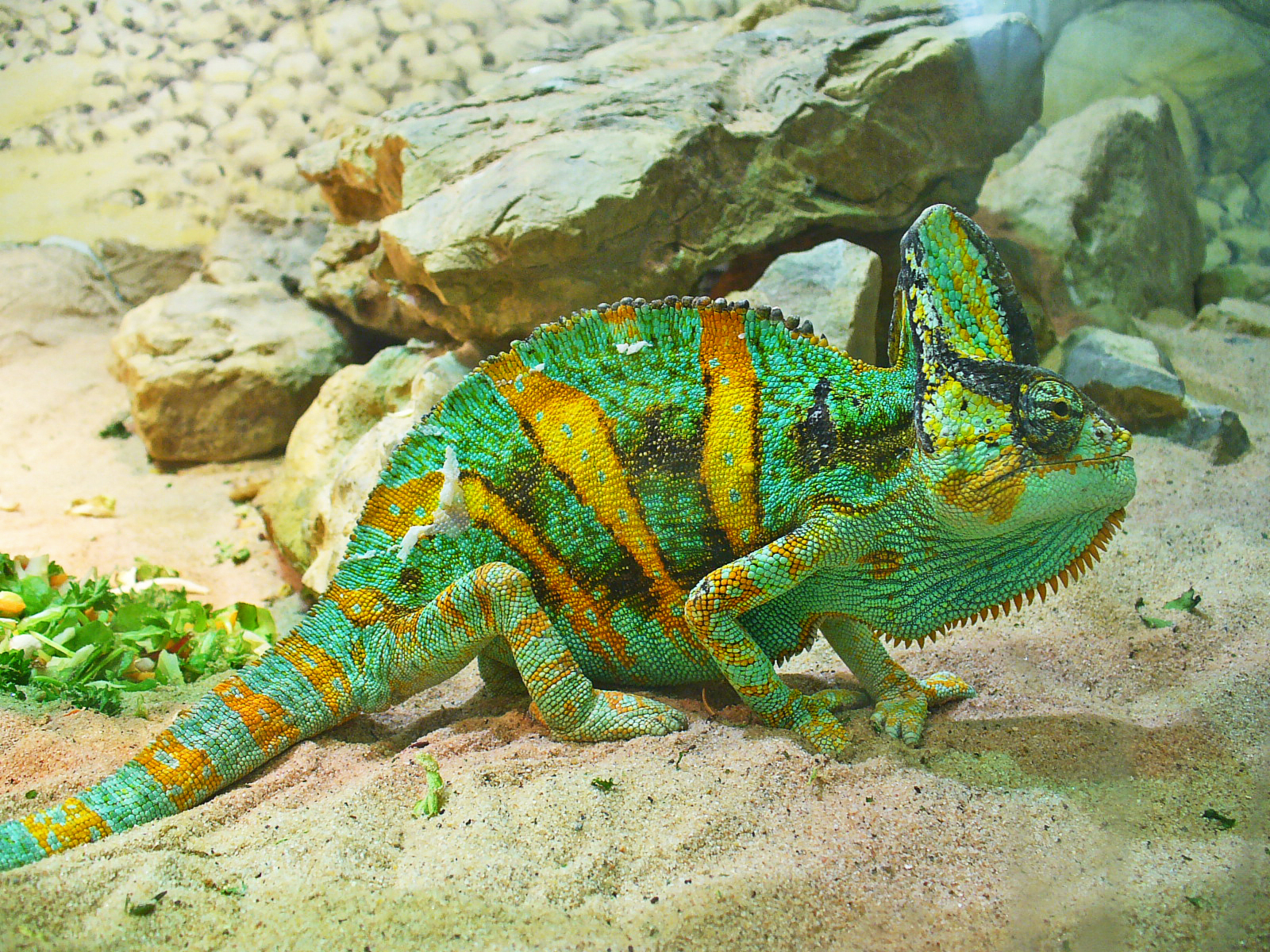
- Veiled chameleon (Chamaeleo calyptratus) - introduced

=== Varanidae ===
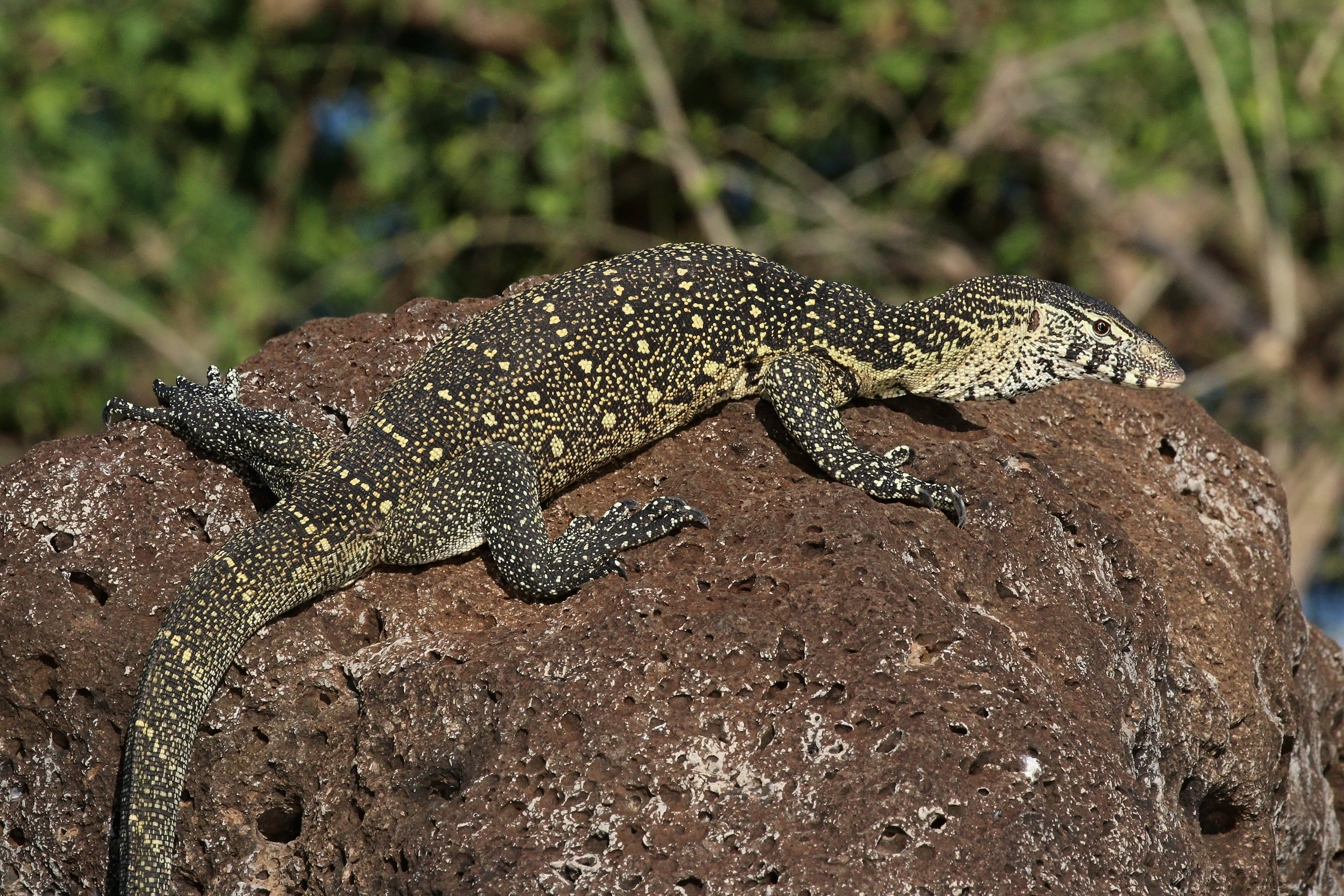
- Nile monitor (Varanus niloticus) - introduced

=== Teiidae ===
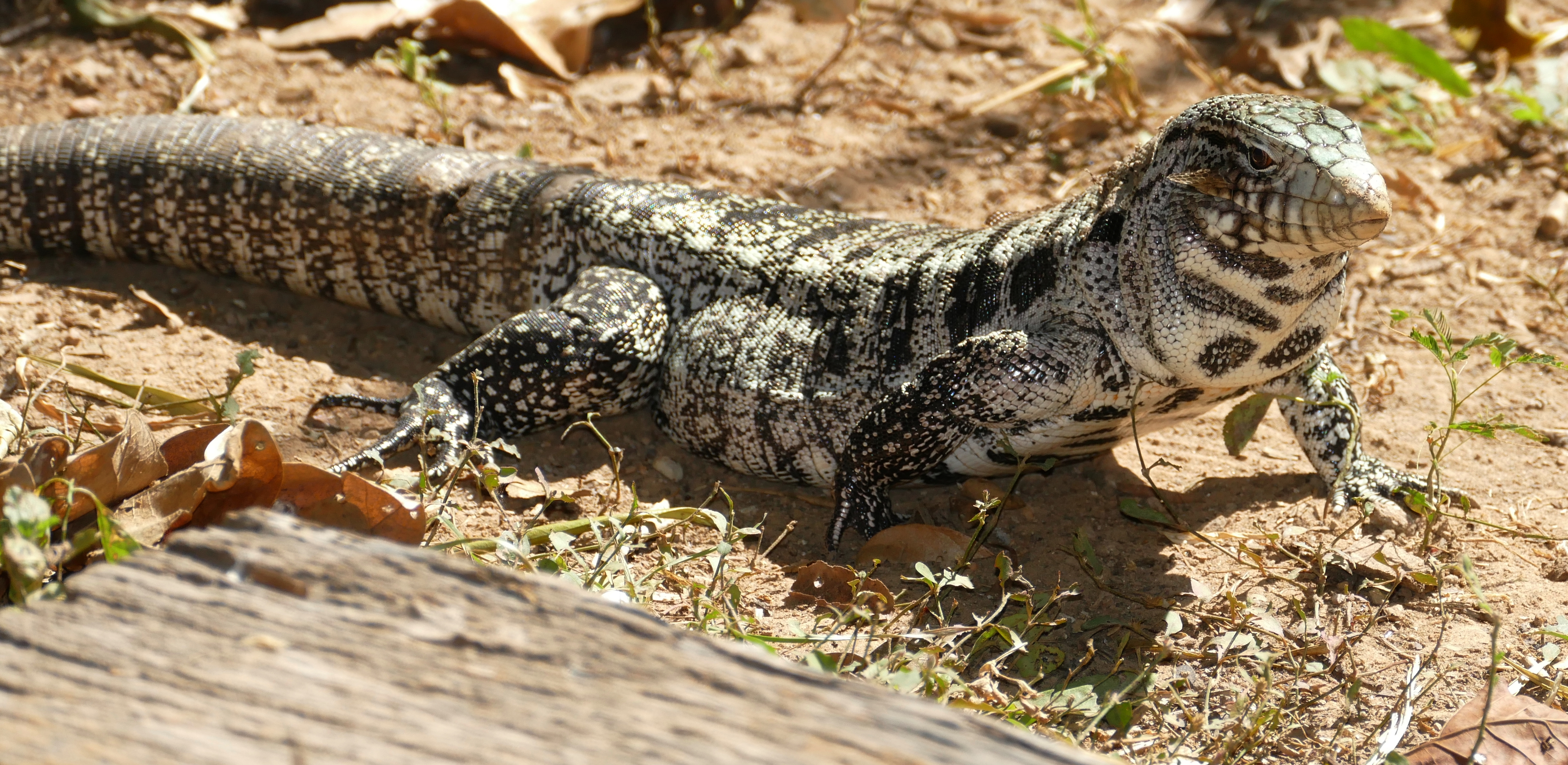
- Argentine black and white tegu (Salvator merianae) - introduced
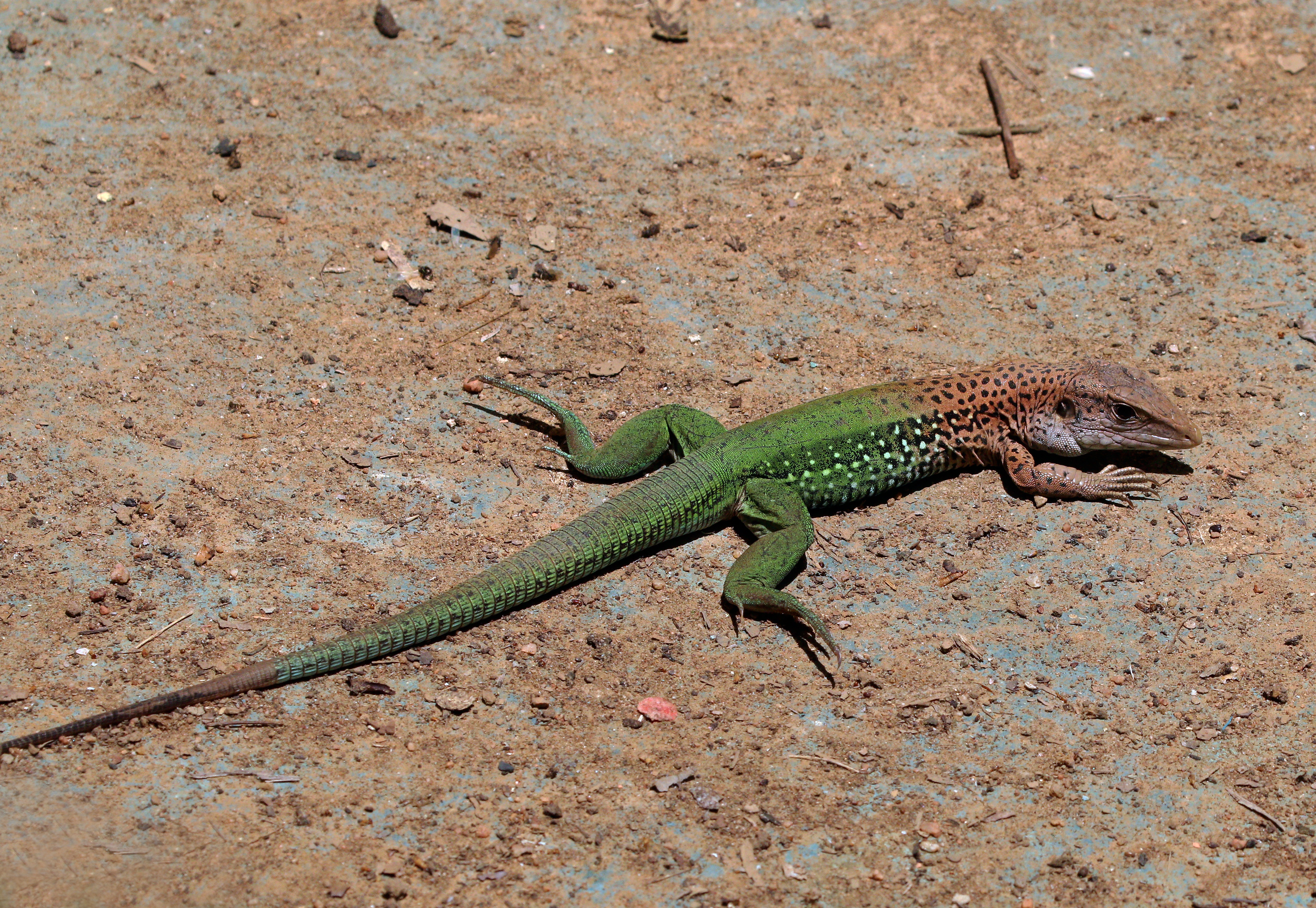
- Giant ameiva (Ameiva ameiva) - introduced
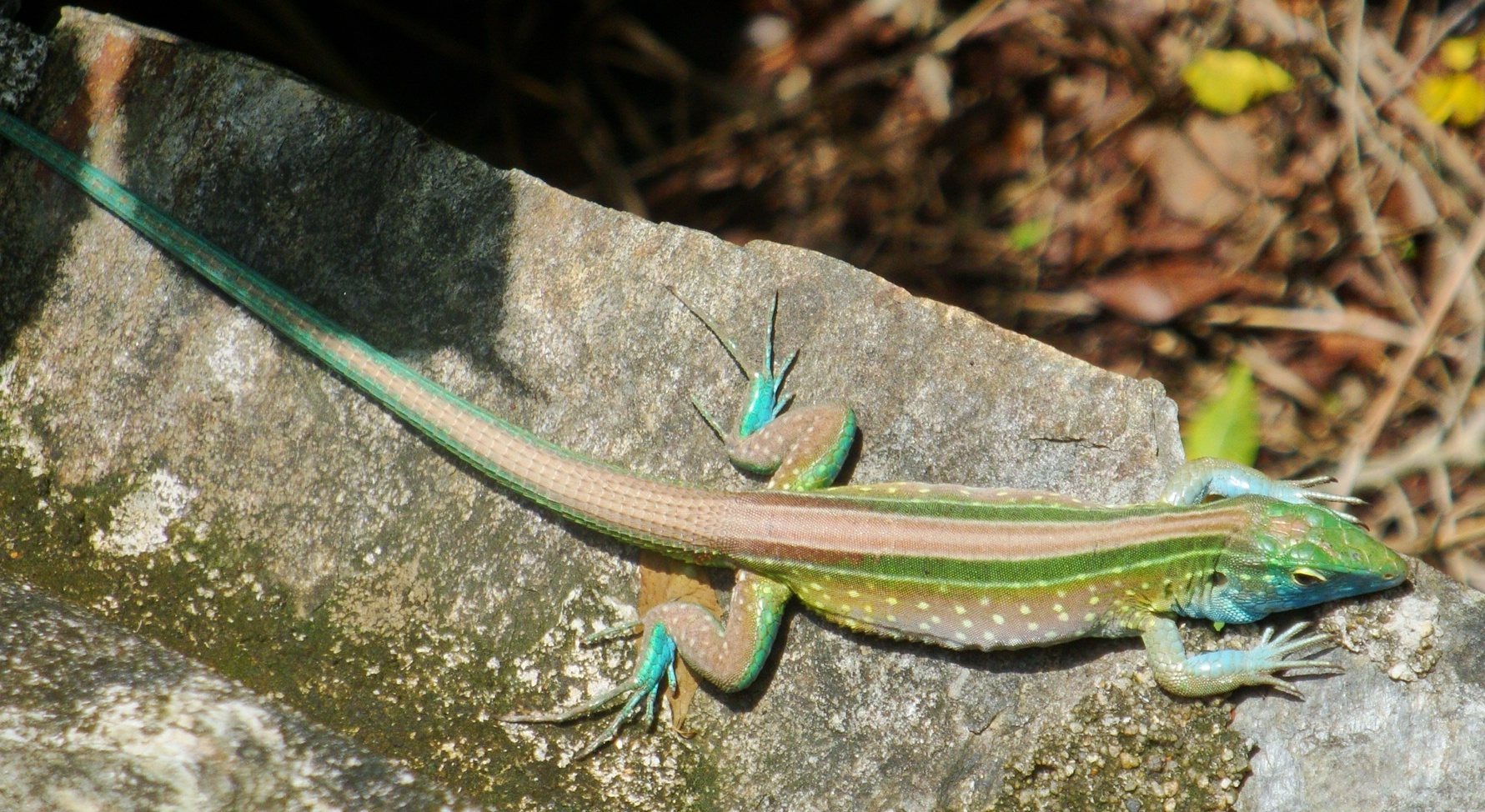
- Rainbow whiptail (Cnemidophorus lemniscatus) - introduced
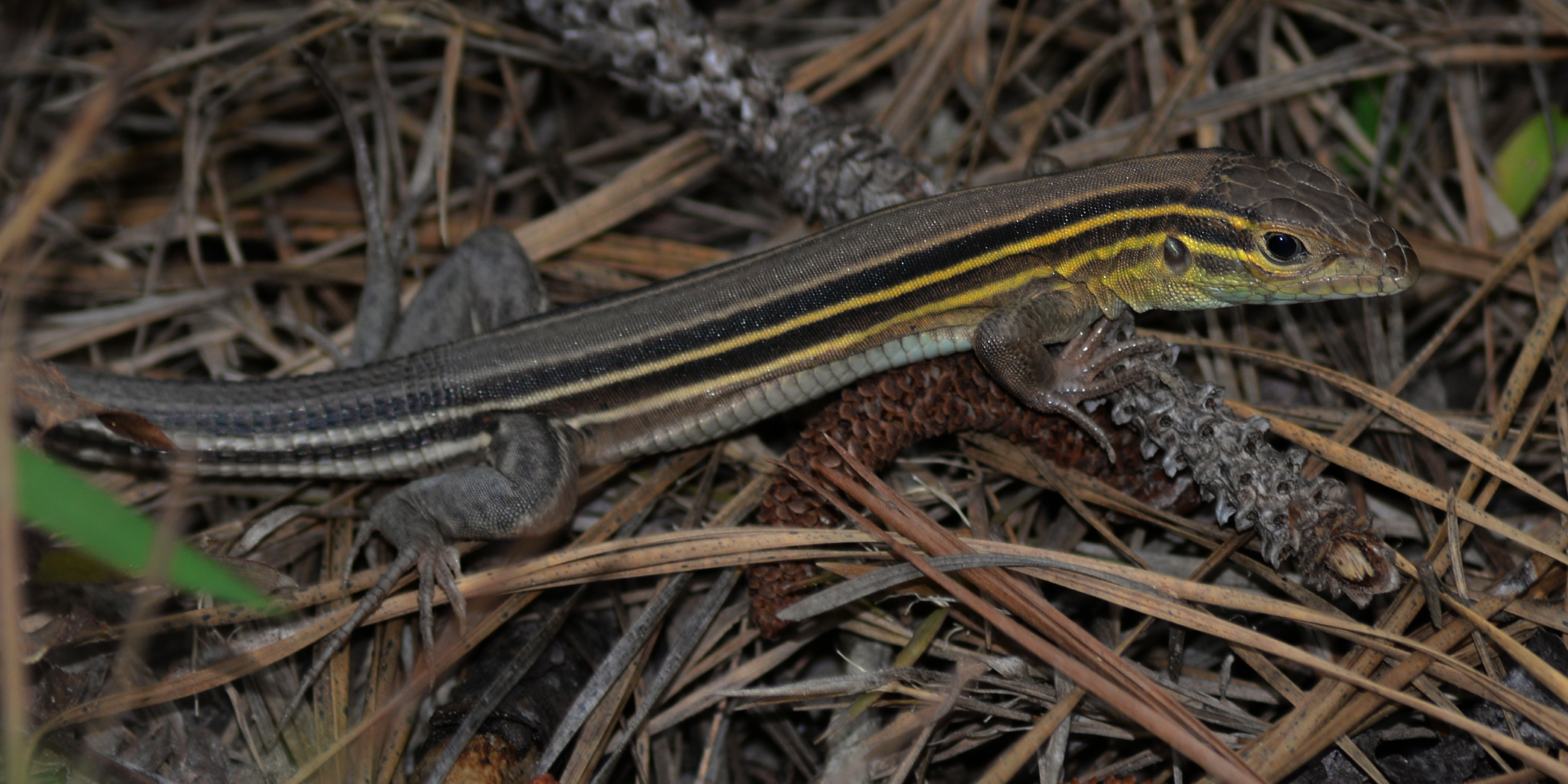
- Six-lined racerunner (Aspidoscelis sexlineatus)

=== Gekkota ===
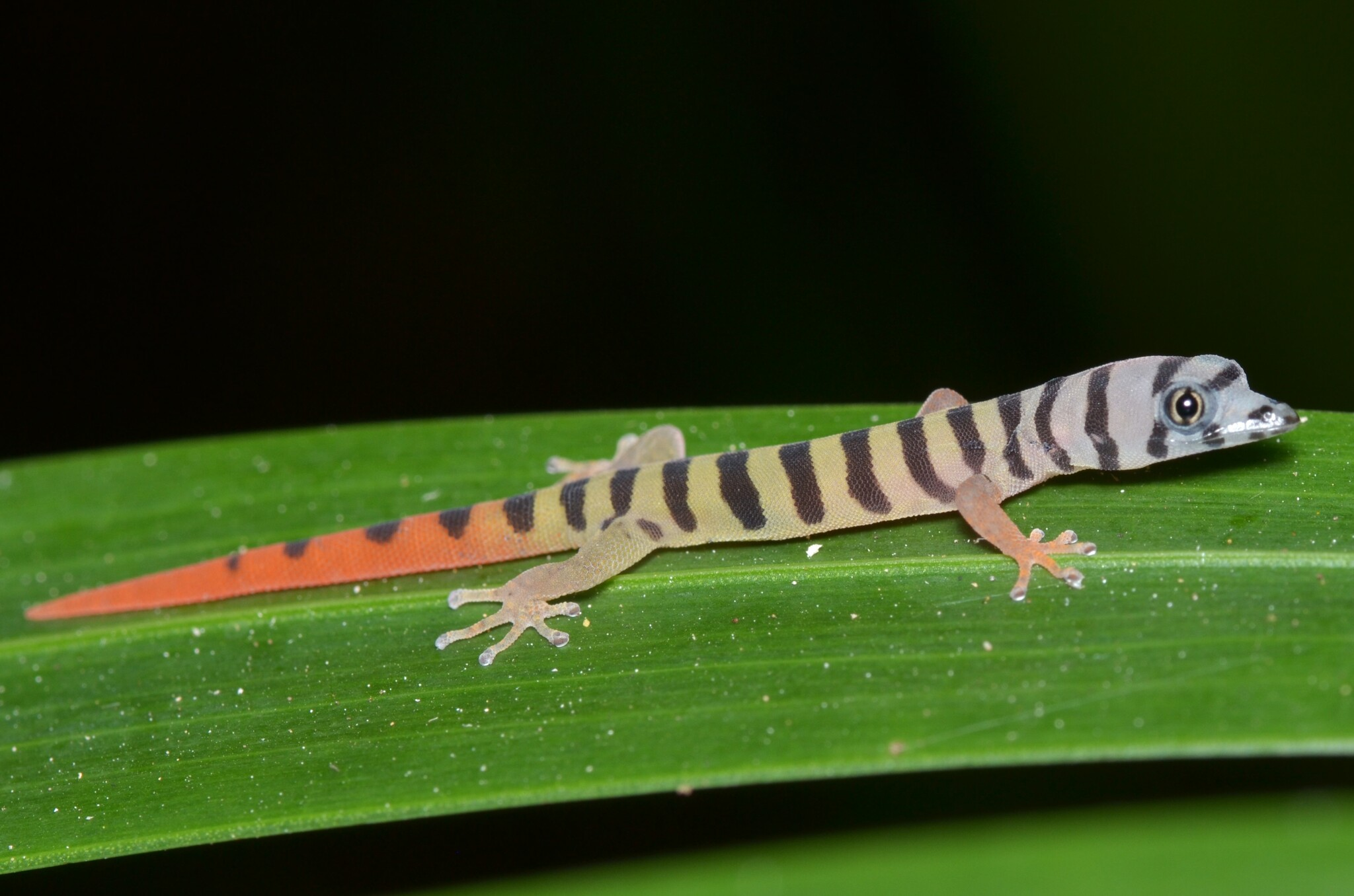
- Ashy gecko (Sphaerodactylus elegans) - introduced
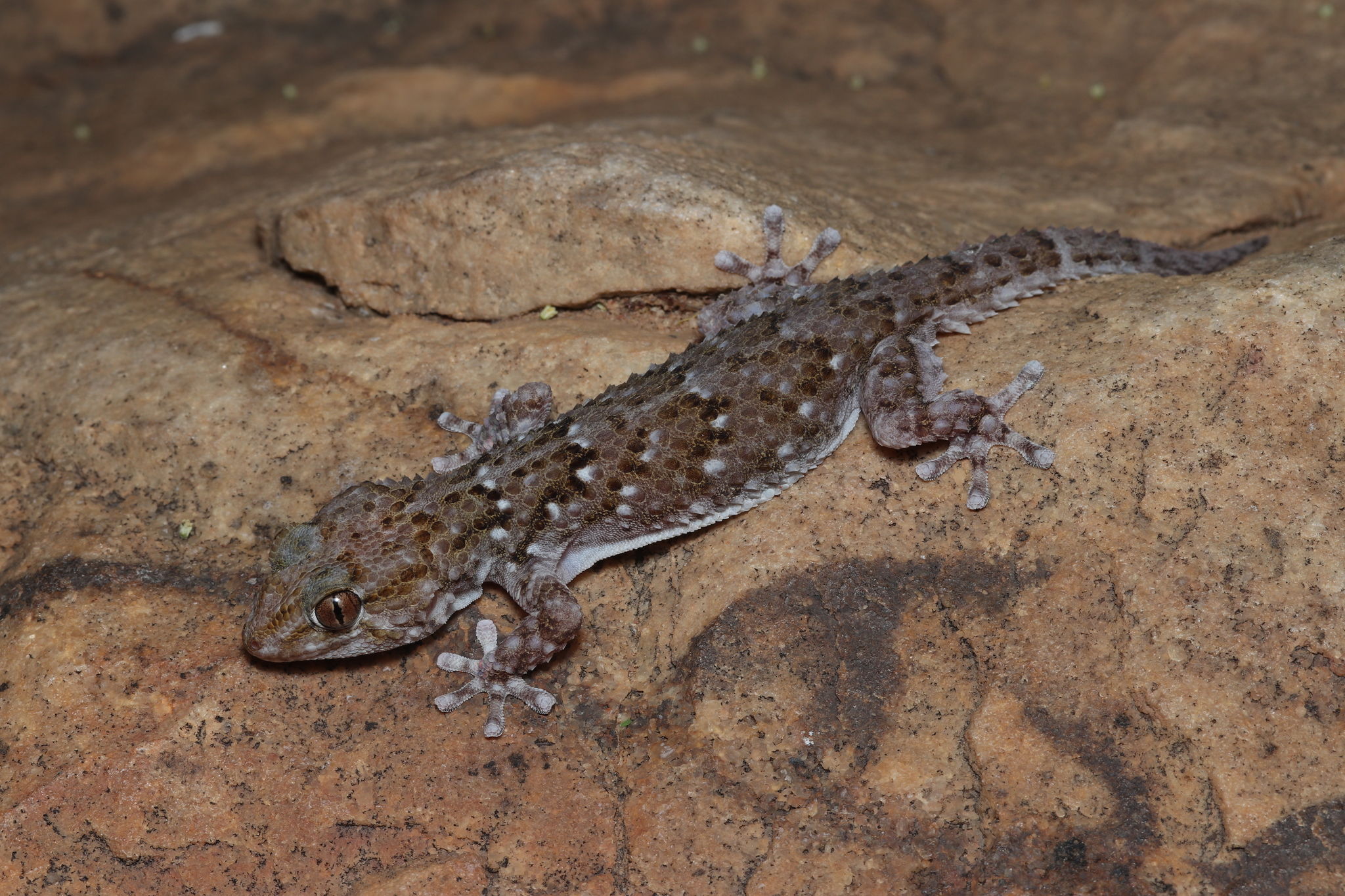
- Bibron's thick-toed gecko (Chondrodactylus bibronii) - introduced
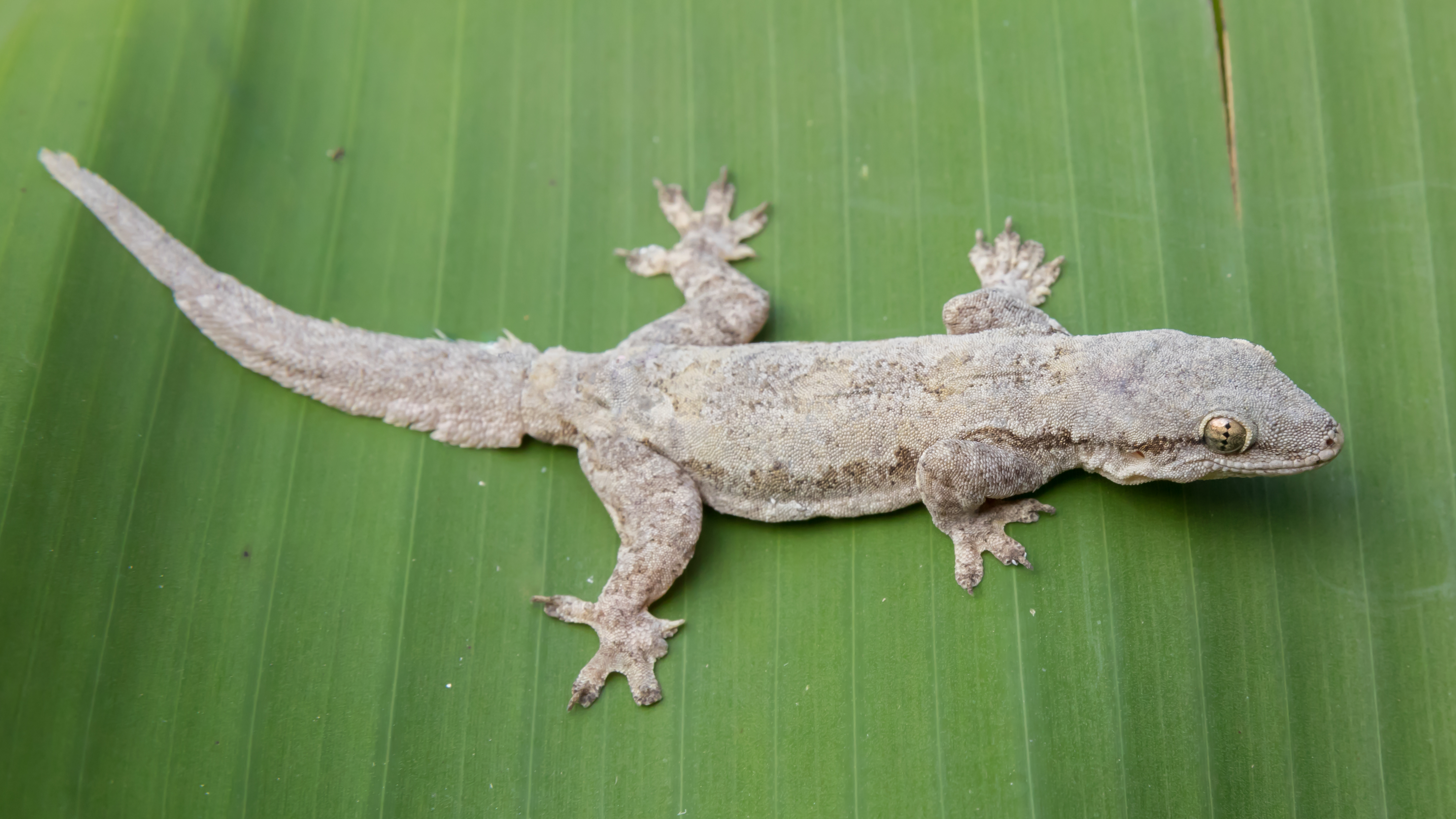
- Flat-tailed house gecko (Hemidactylus platyurus) - introduced
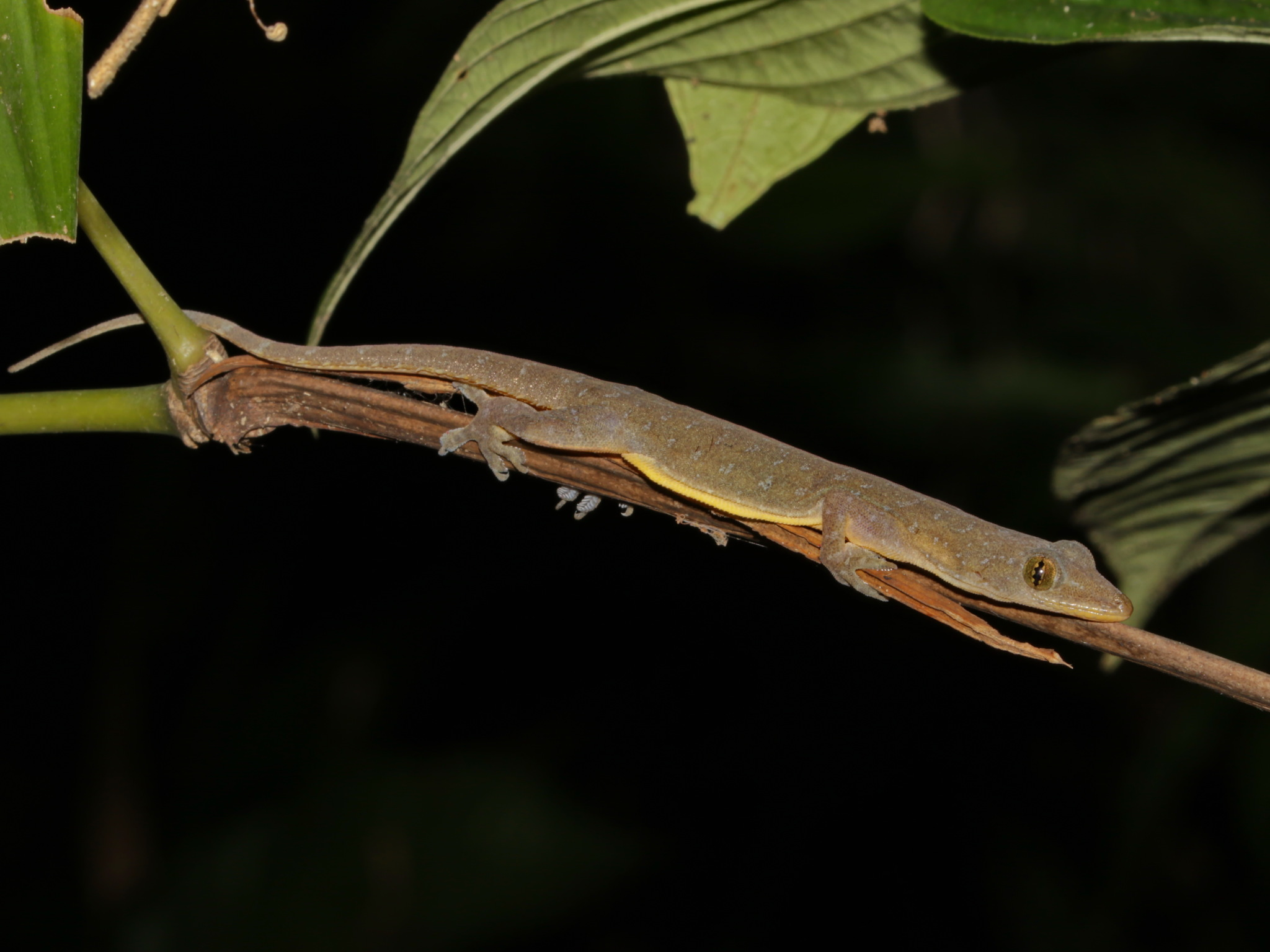
- Indo-Pacific gecko (Hemidactylus garnotii) - introduced
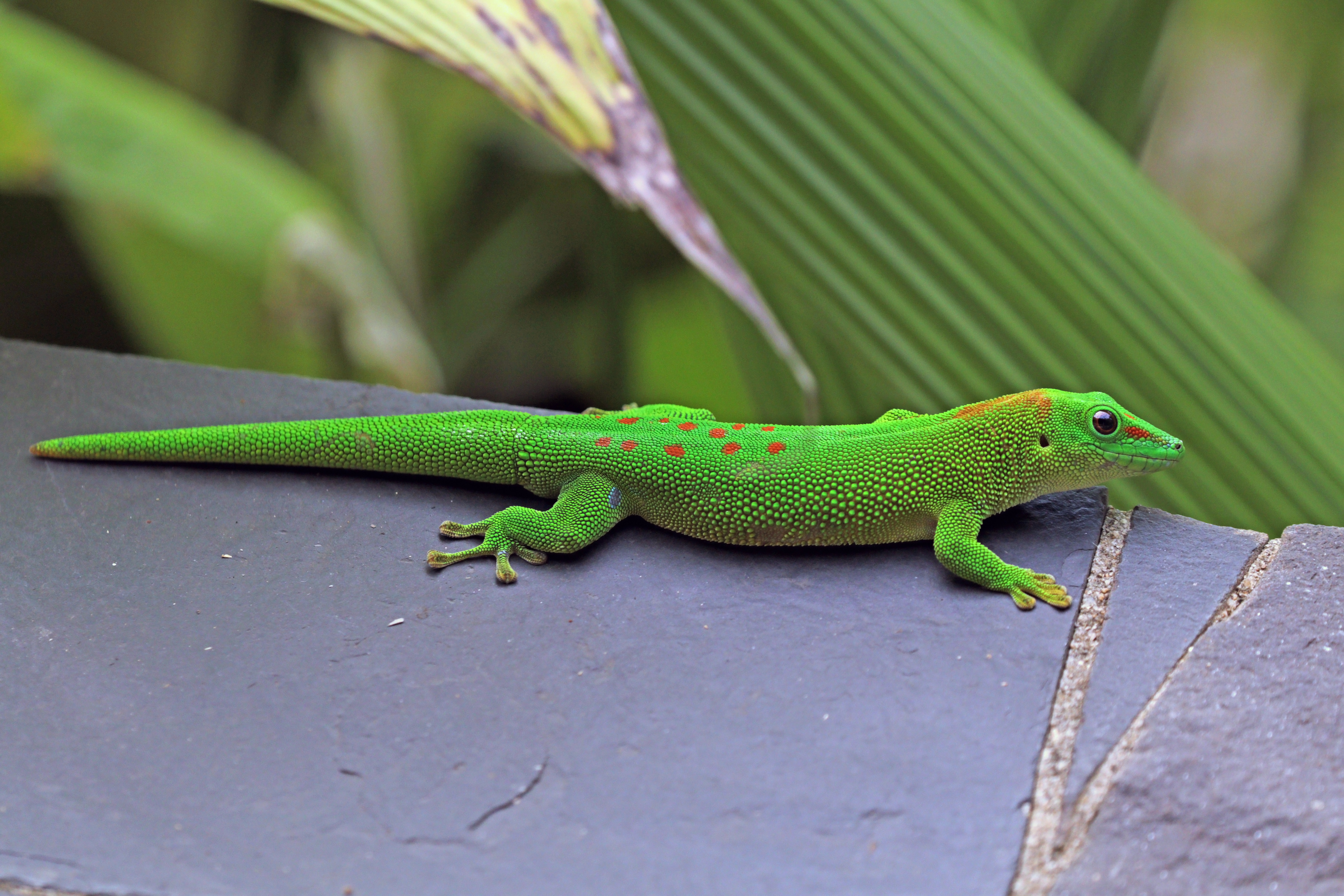
- Madagascan giant day gecko (Phelsuma grandis) - introduced
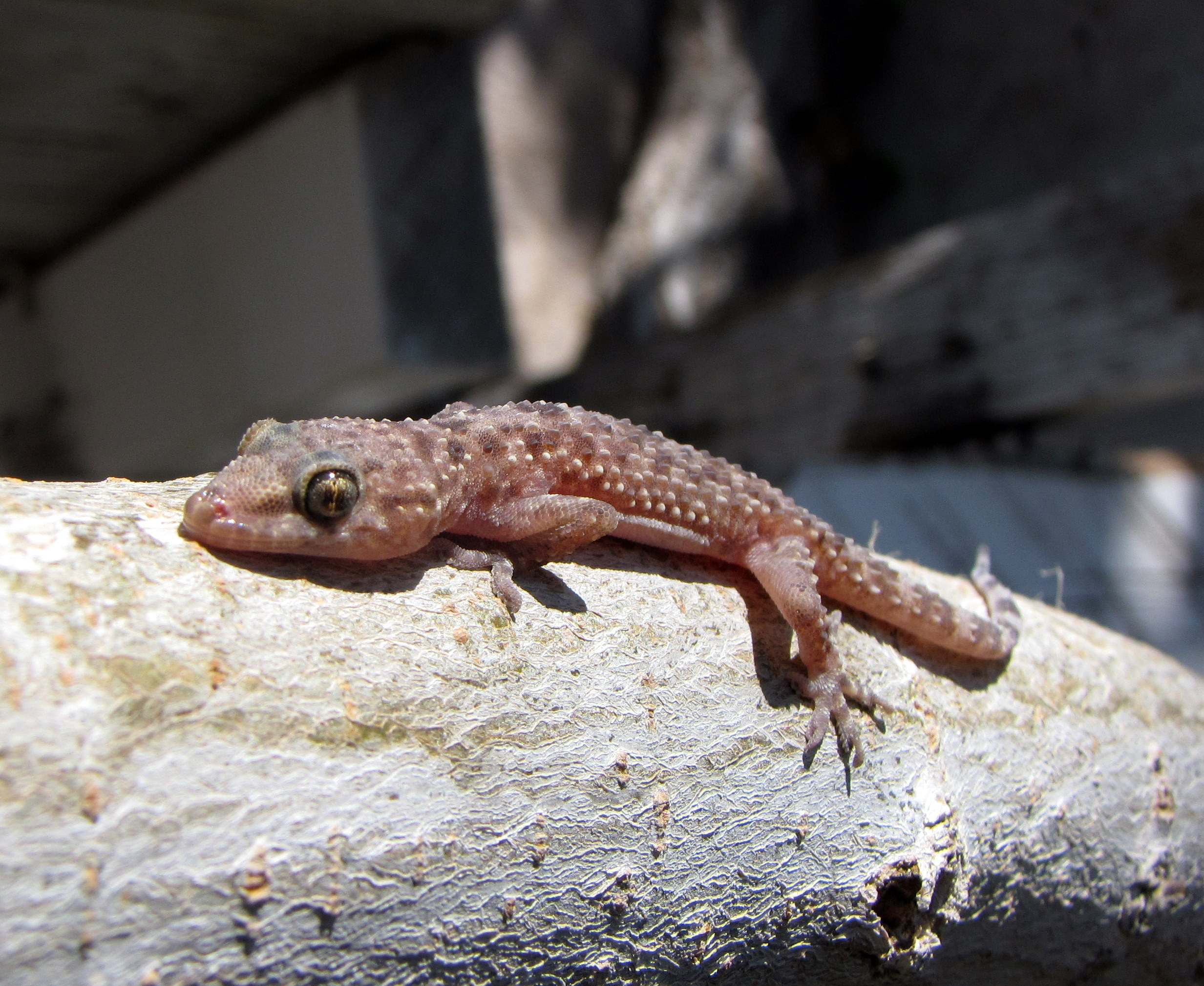
- Mediterranean house gecko (Hemidactylus turcicus) - introduced
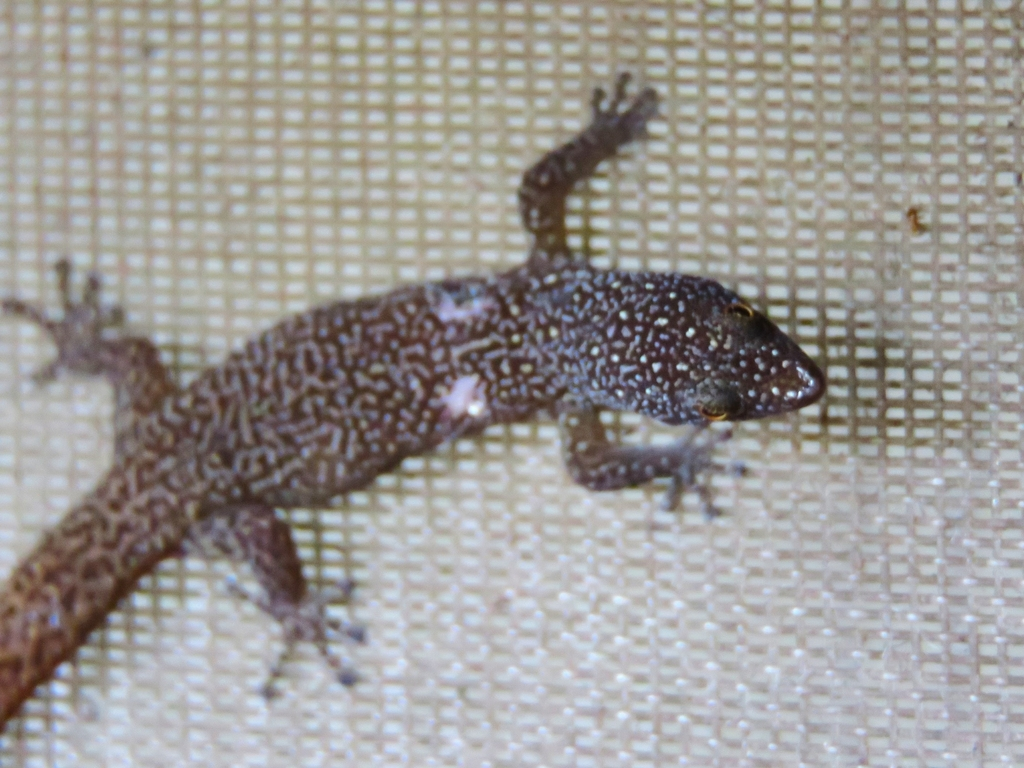
- Ocellated gecko (Sphaerodactylus argus) - introduced
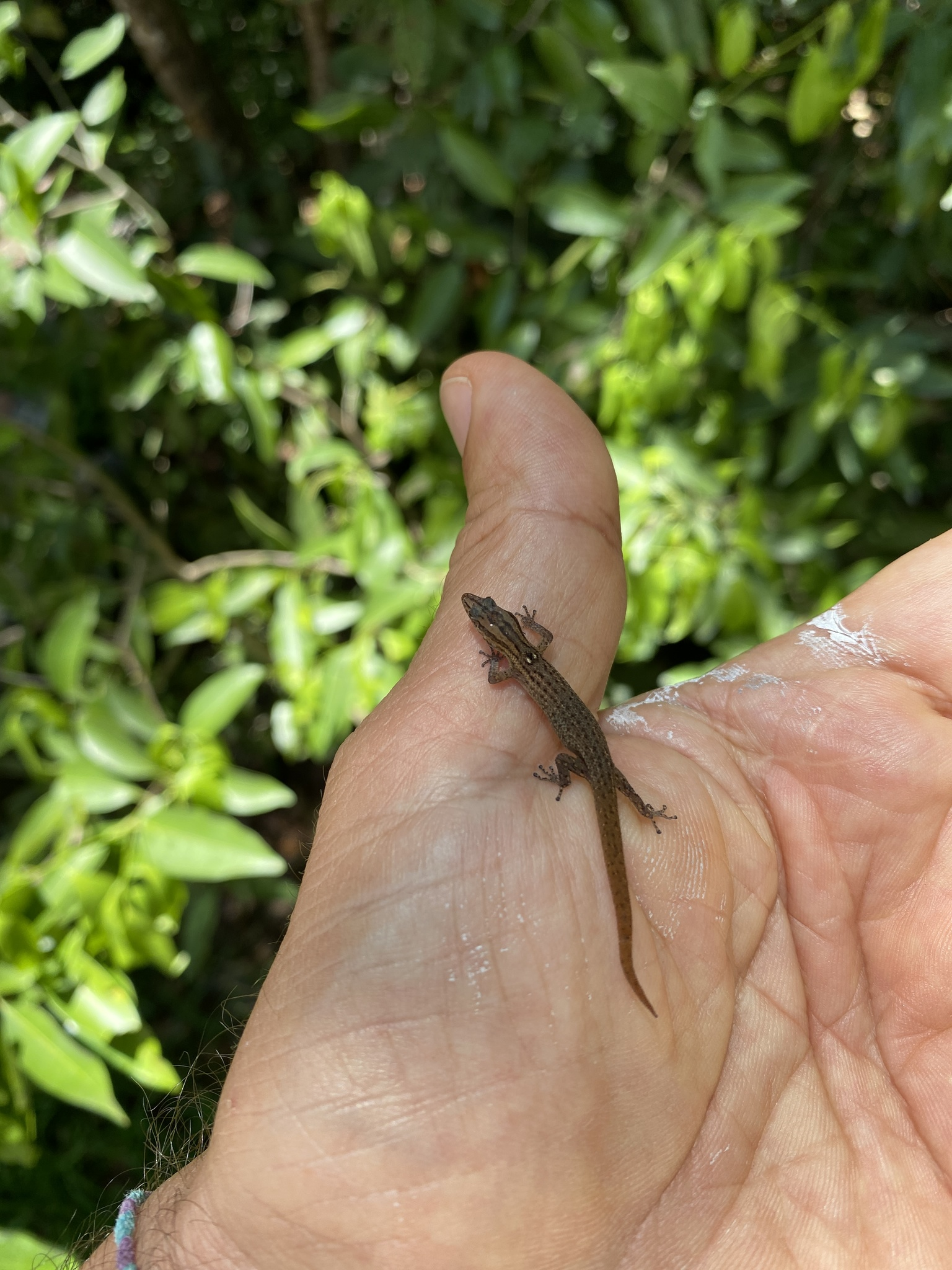
- Reef gecko (Sphaerodactylus notatus)
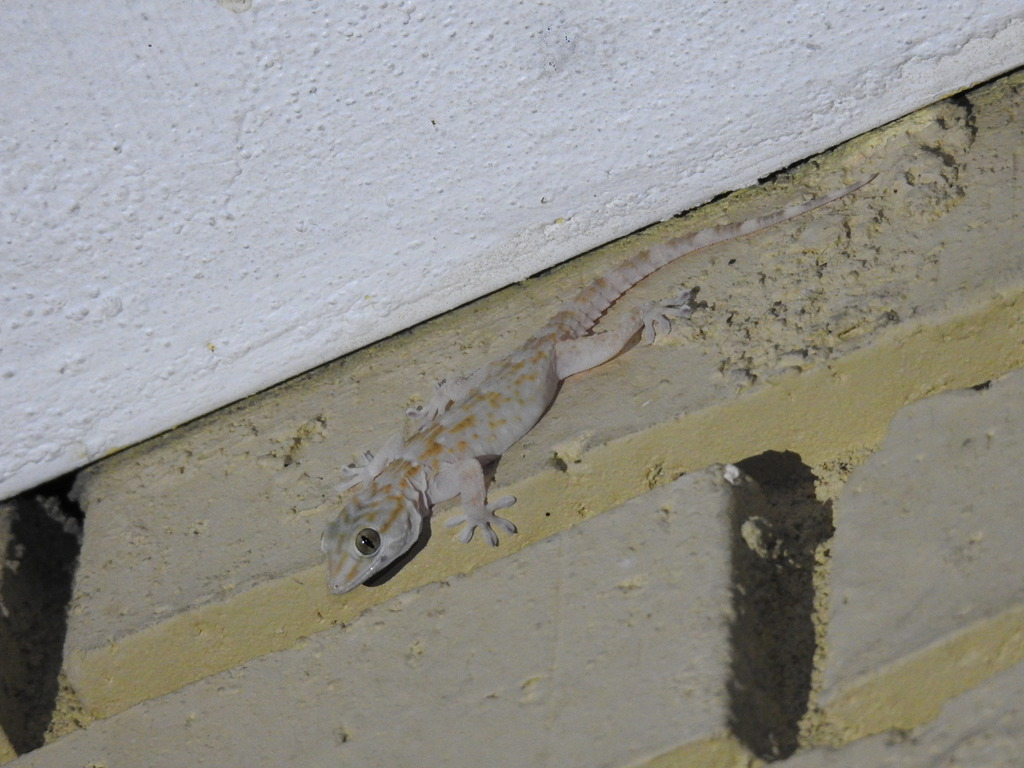
- Ringed wall gecko Tarentola annularis - introduced
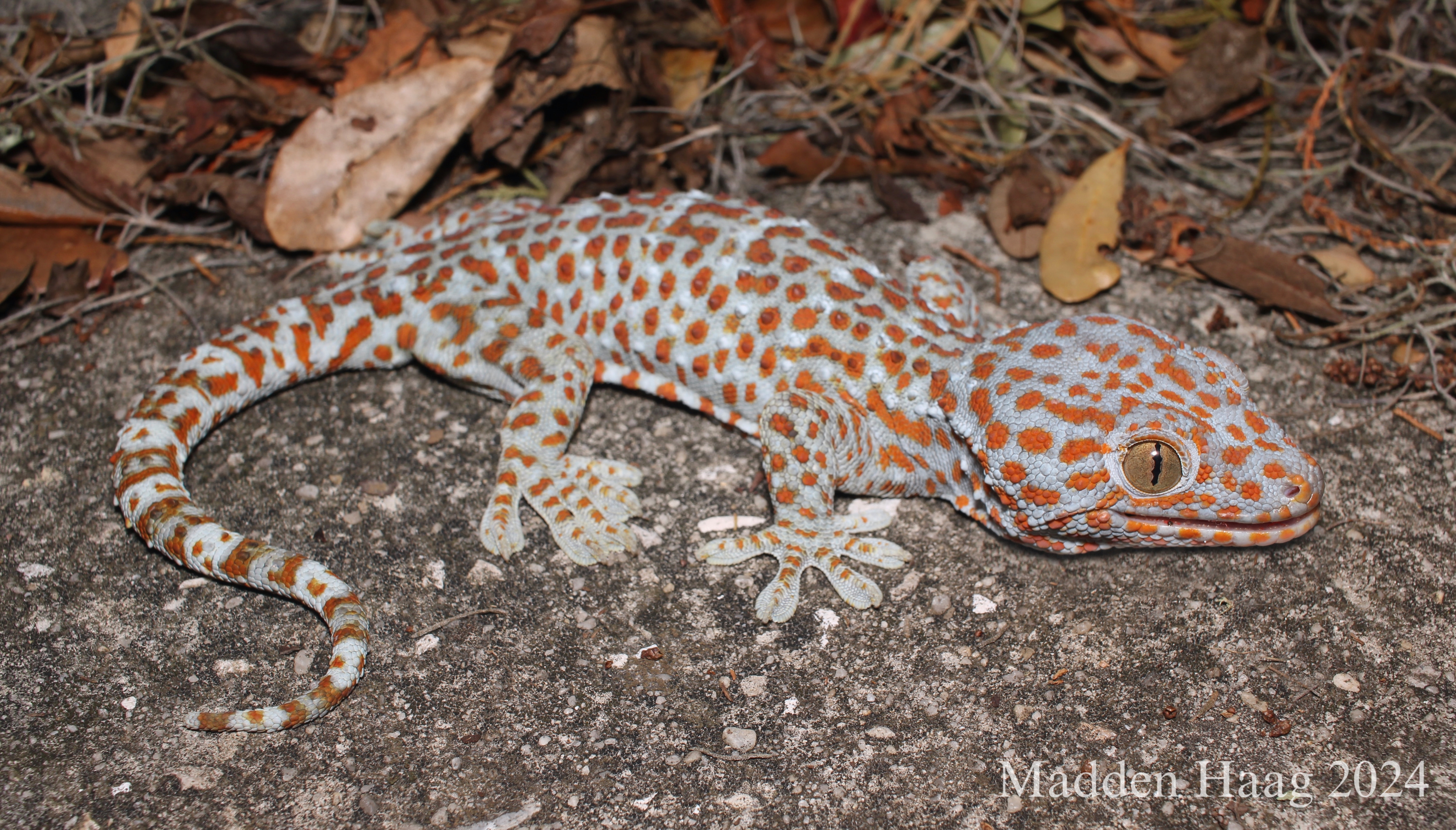
- Tokay gecko (Gekko gecko) - introduced
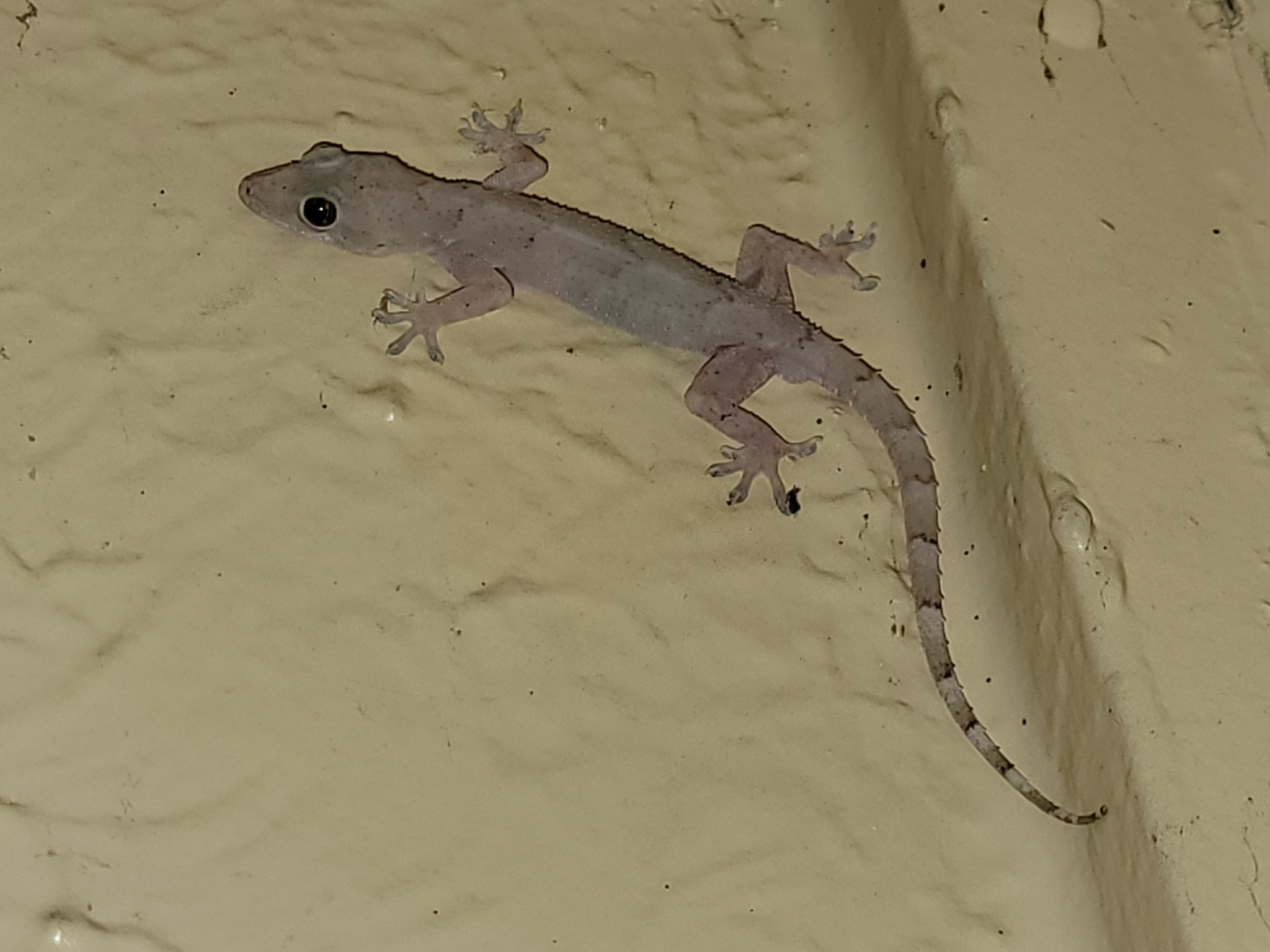
- Tropical house gecko (Hemidactylus mabouia) - introduced
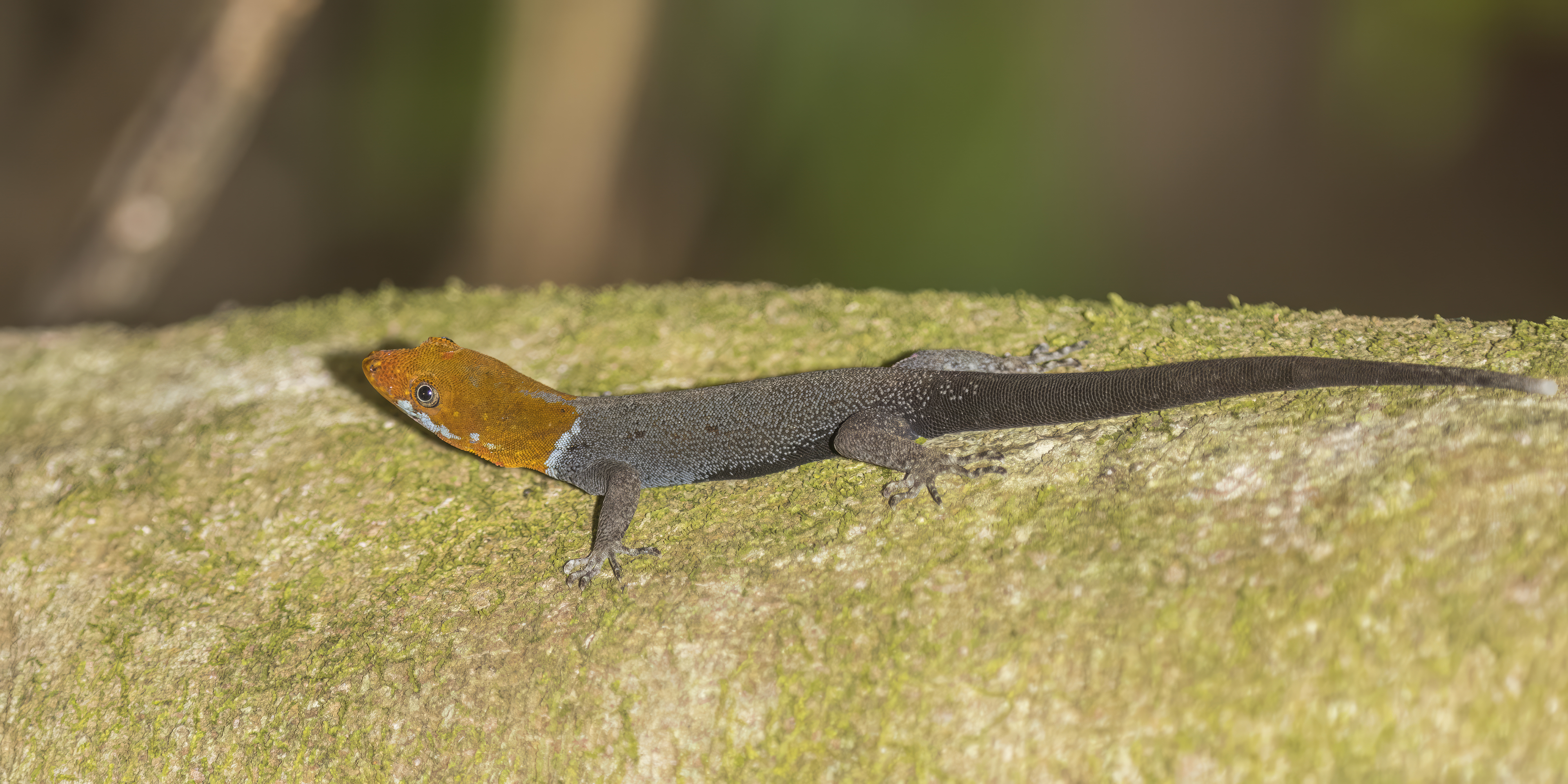
- Yellow-headed gecko (Gonatodes albogularis) - introduced

=== Scincidae ===
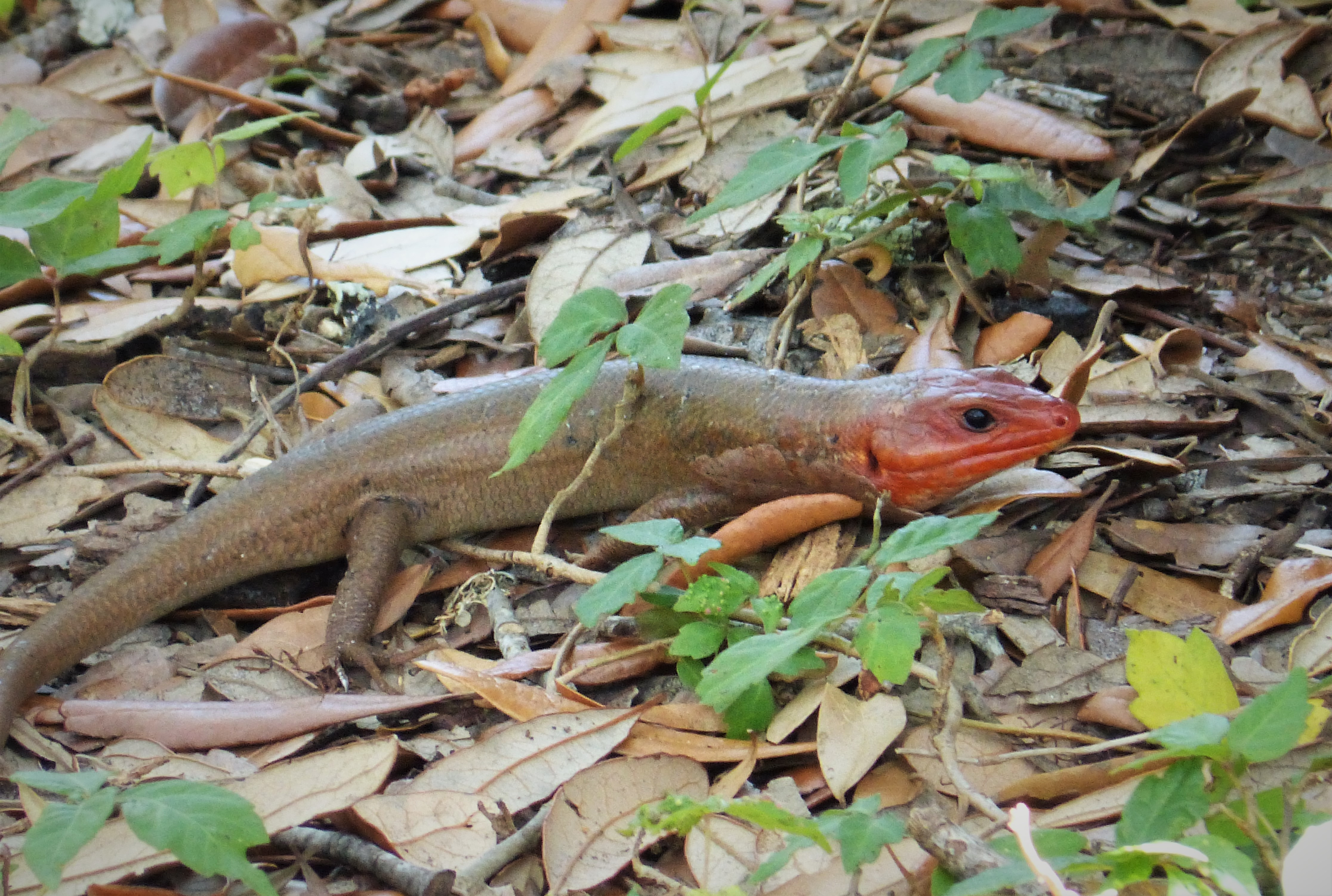
- Broadhead skink (Plestiodon laticeps)
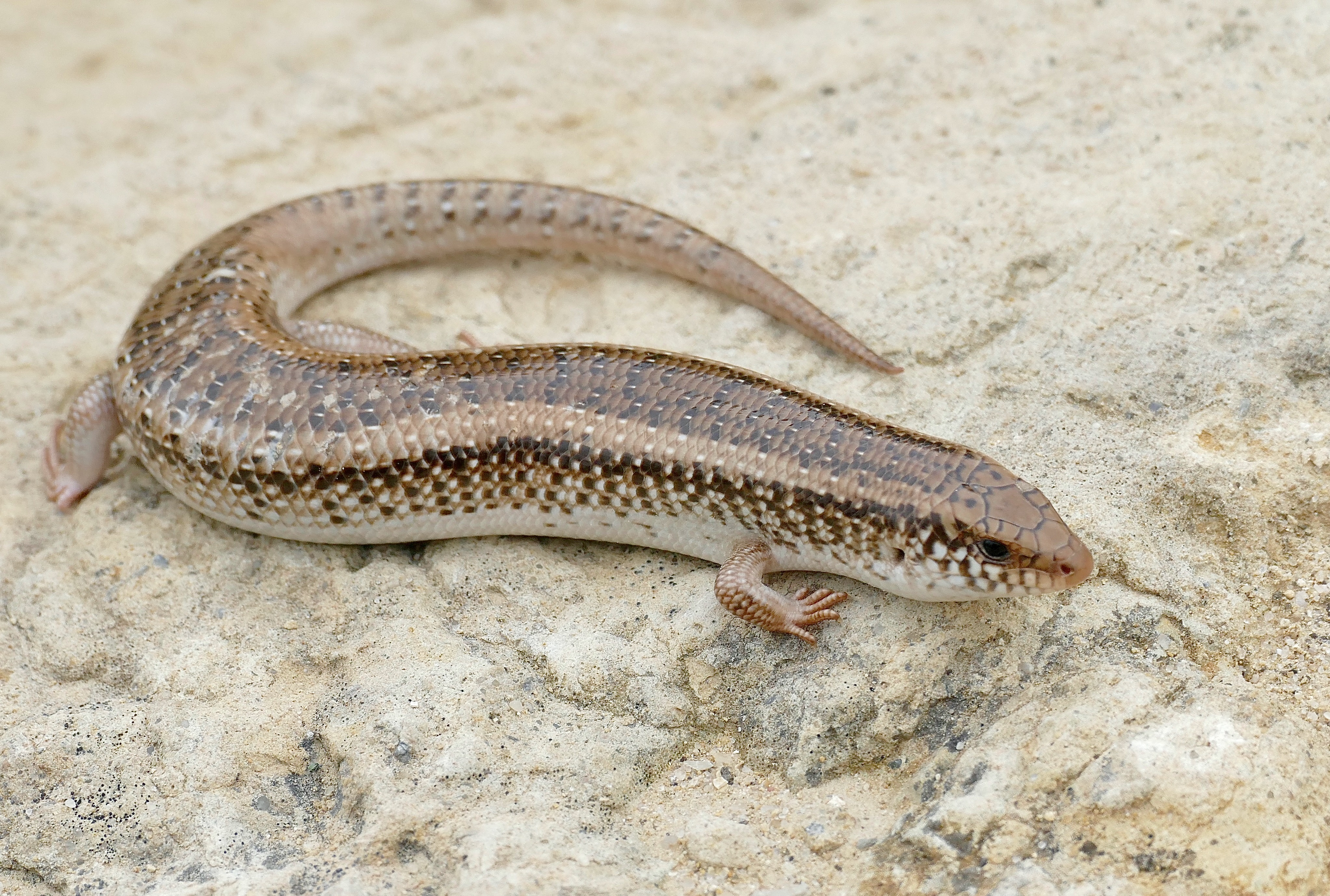
- Ocellated skink (Chalcides ocellatus) - introduced
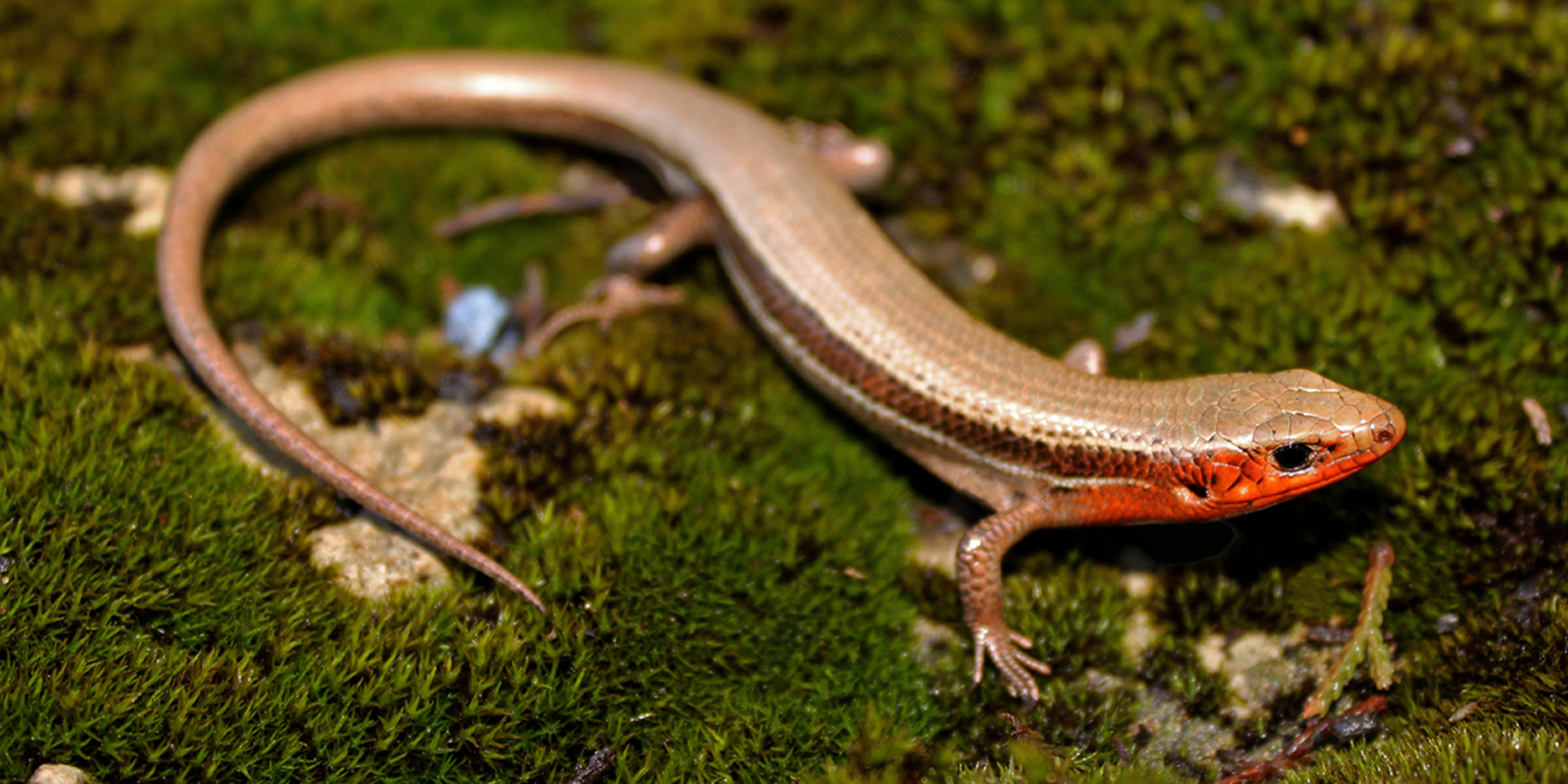
- Coal skink (Plestiodon anthracinus)
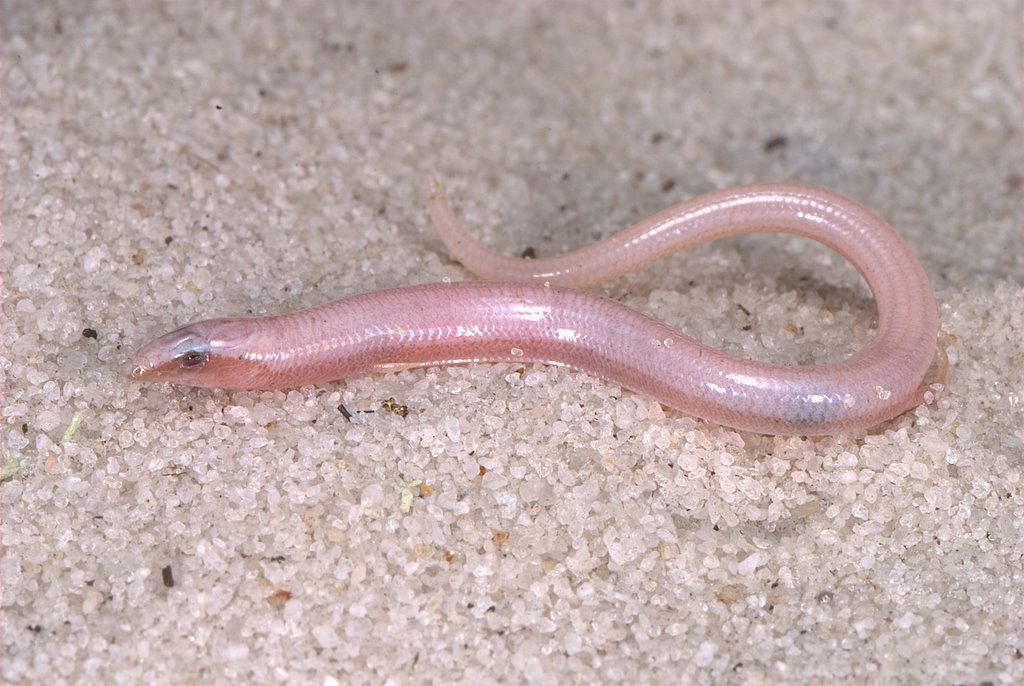
- Sand skink (Plestiodon reynoldsi)
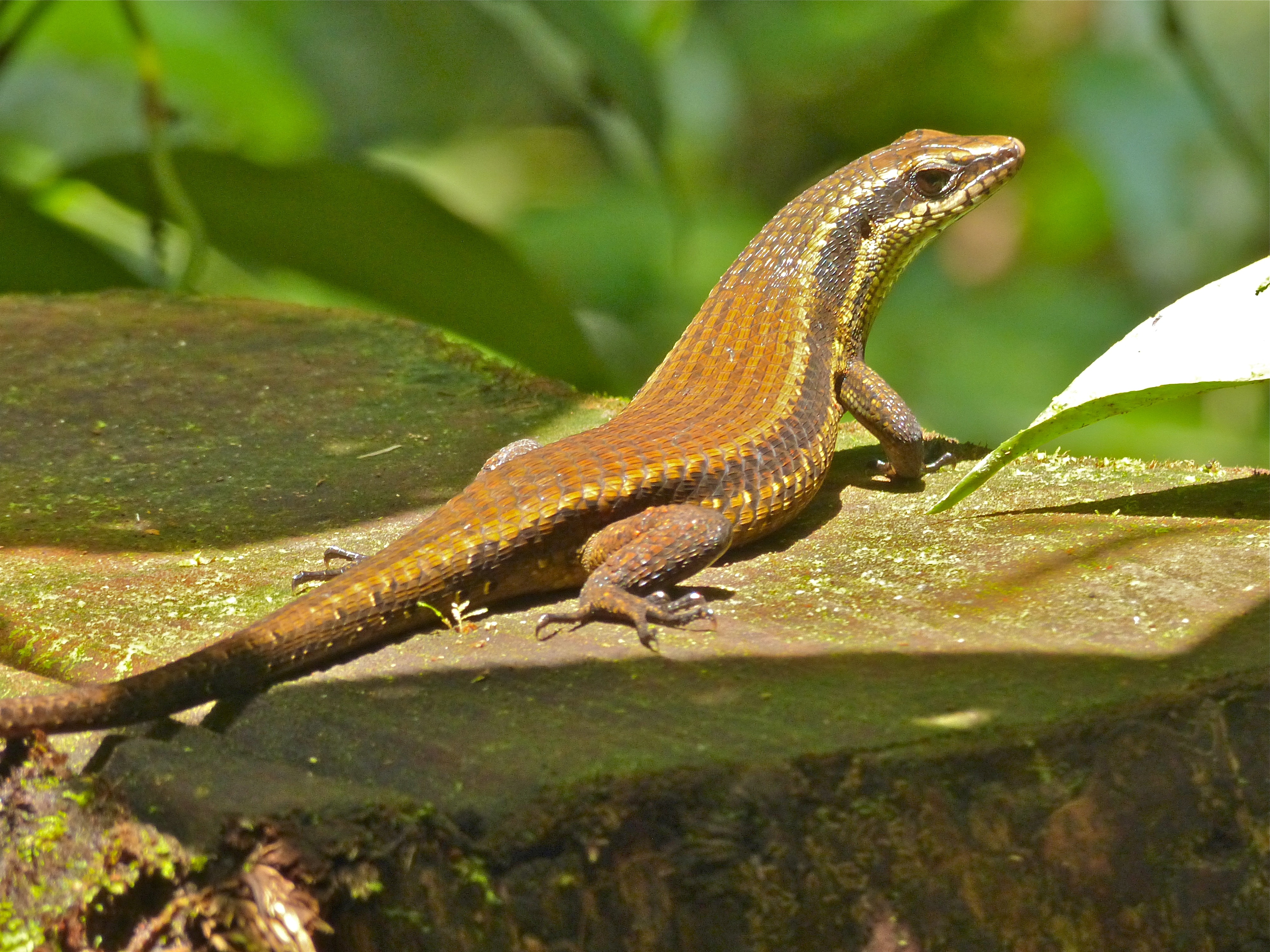
- Rough mabuya (Eutropis rudis) - introduced
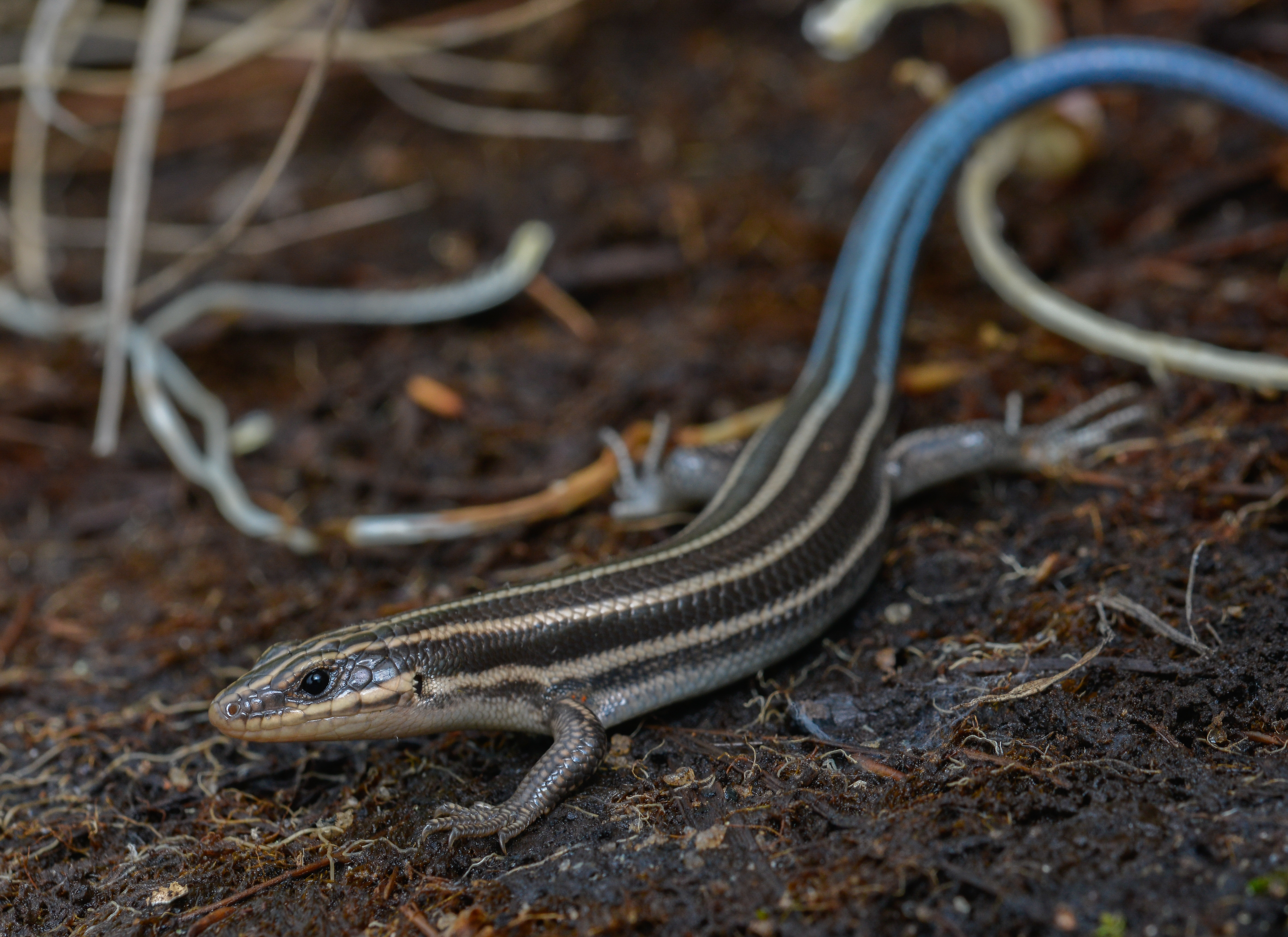
- Five-lined skink (Plestiodon fasciatus)
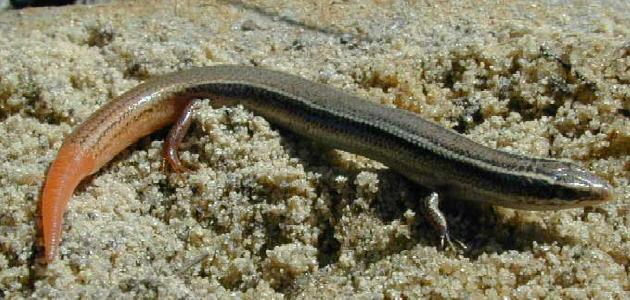
- Mole skink (Plestiodon egregius)
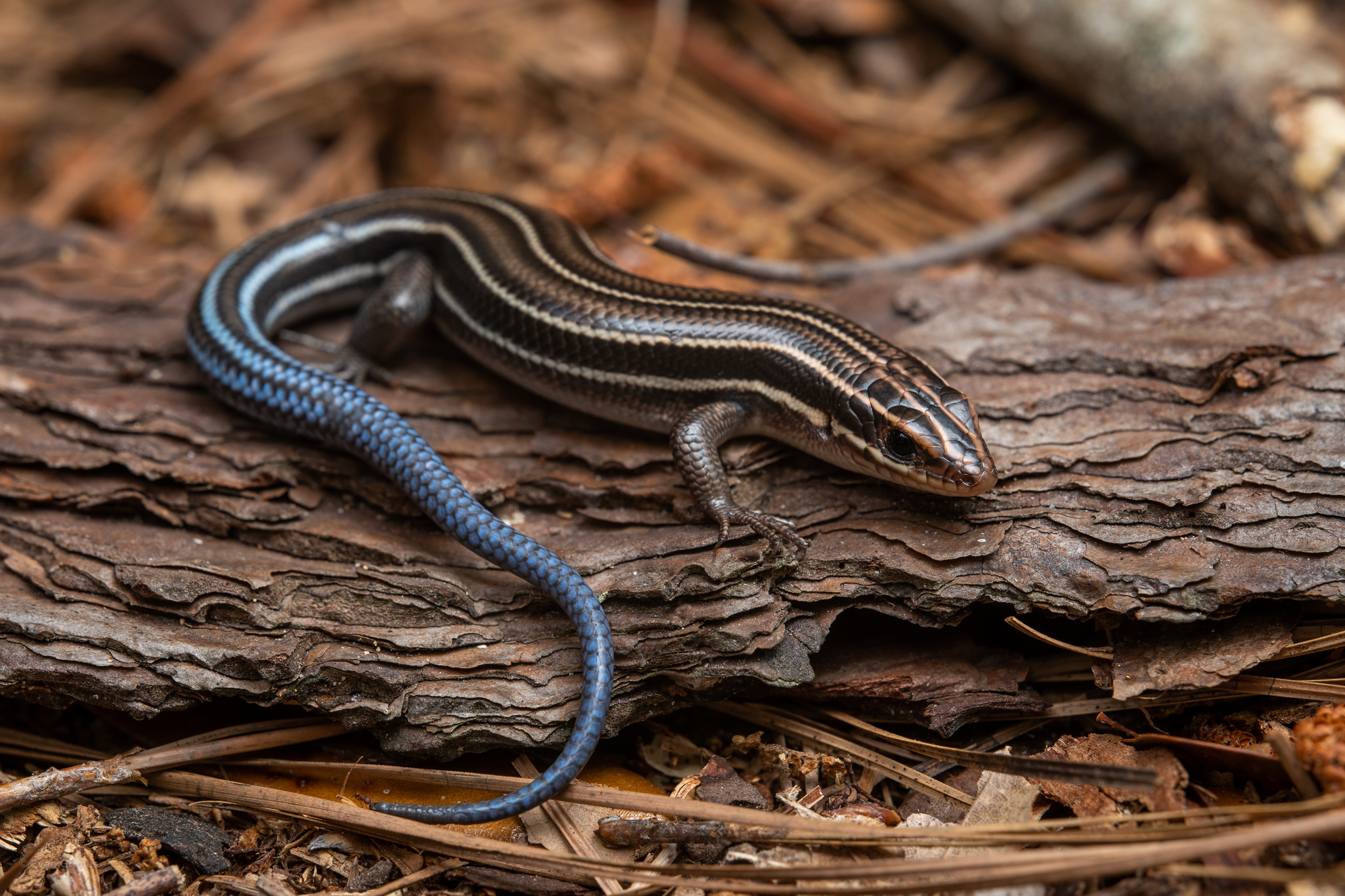
- Southeastern five-lined skink (Plestiodon inexpectatus)
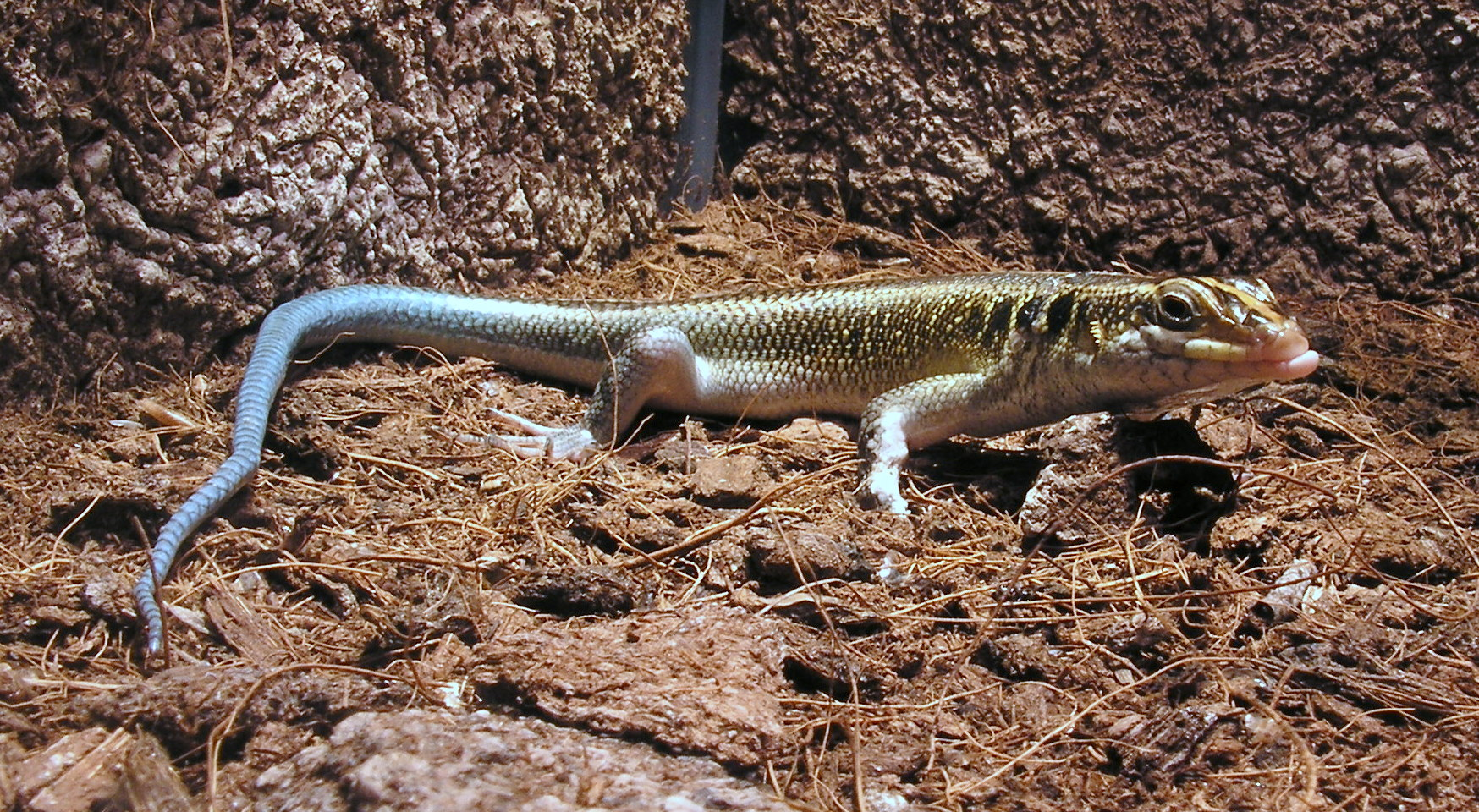
- African five-lined skink (Trachylepis quinquetaeniata) - introduced

=== Anguidae ===
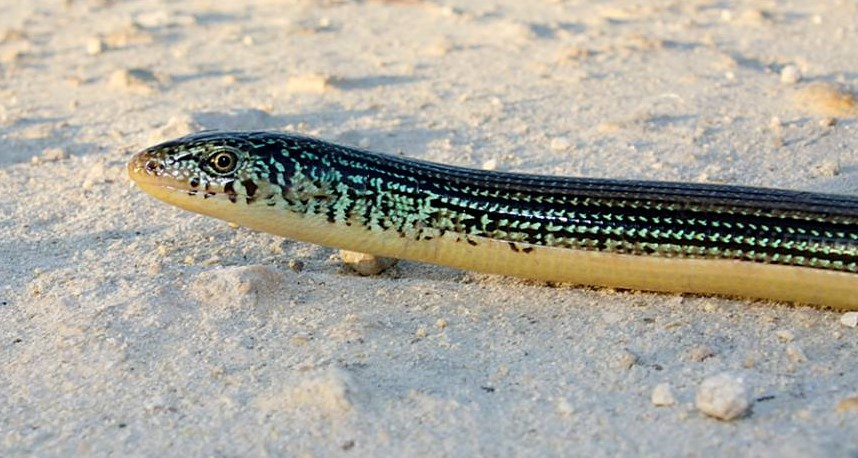
- Eastern glass lizard (Ophisaurus ventralis)
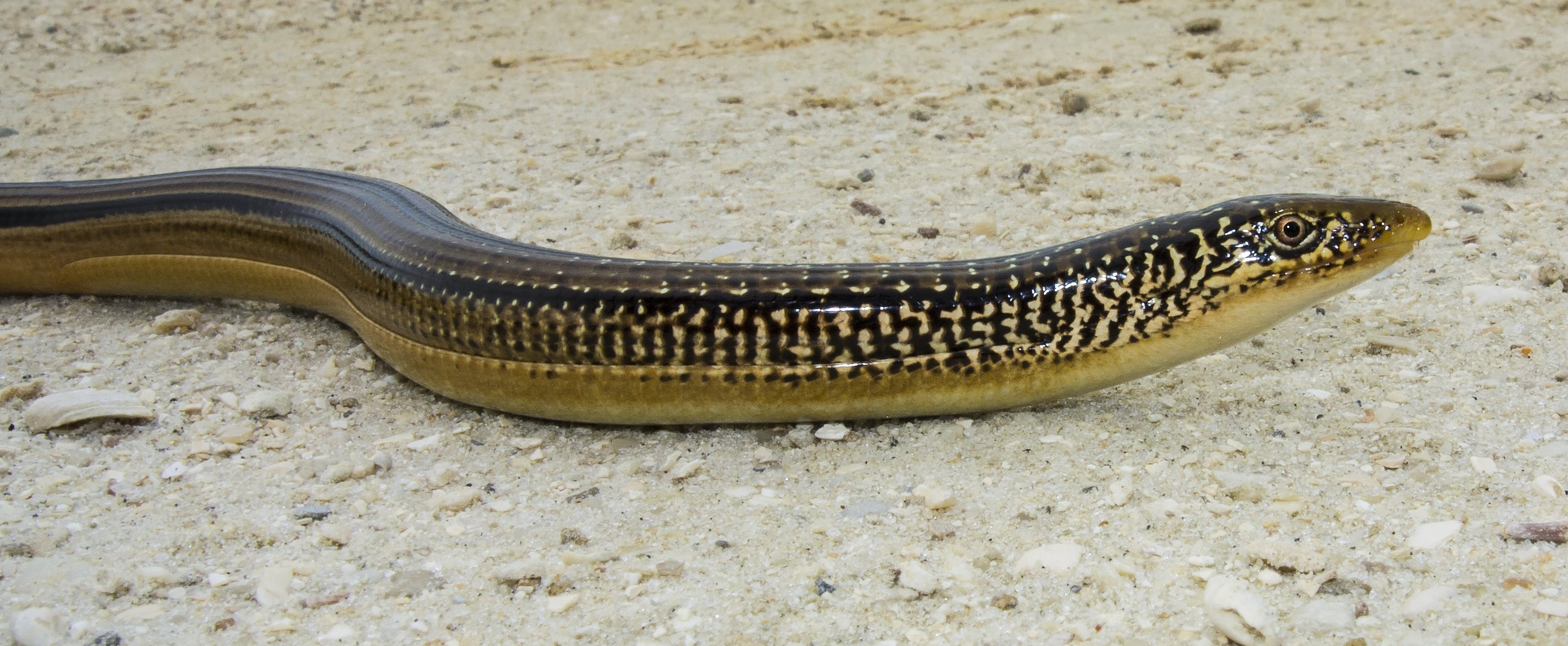
- Island glass lizard (Ophisaurus compressus)
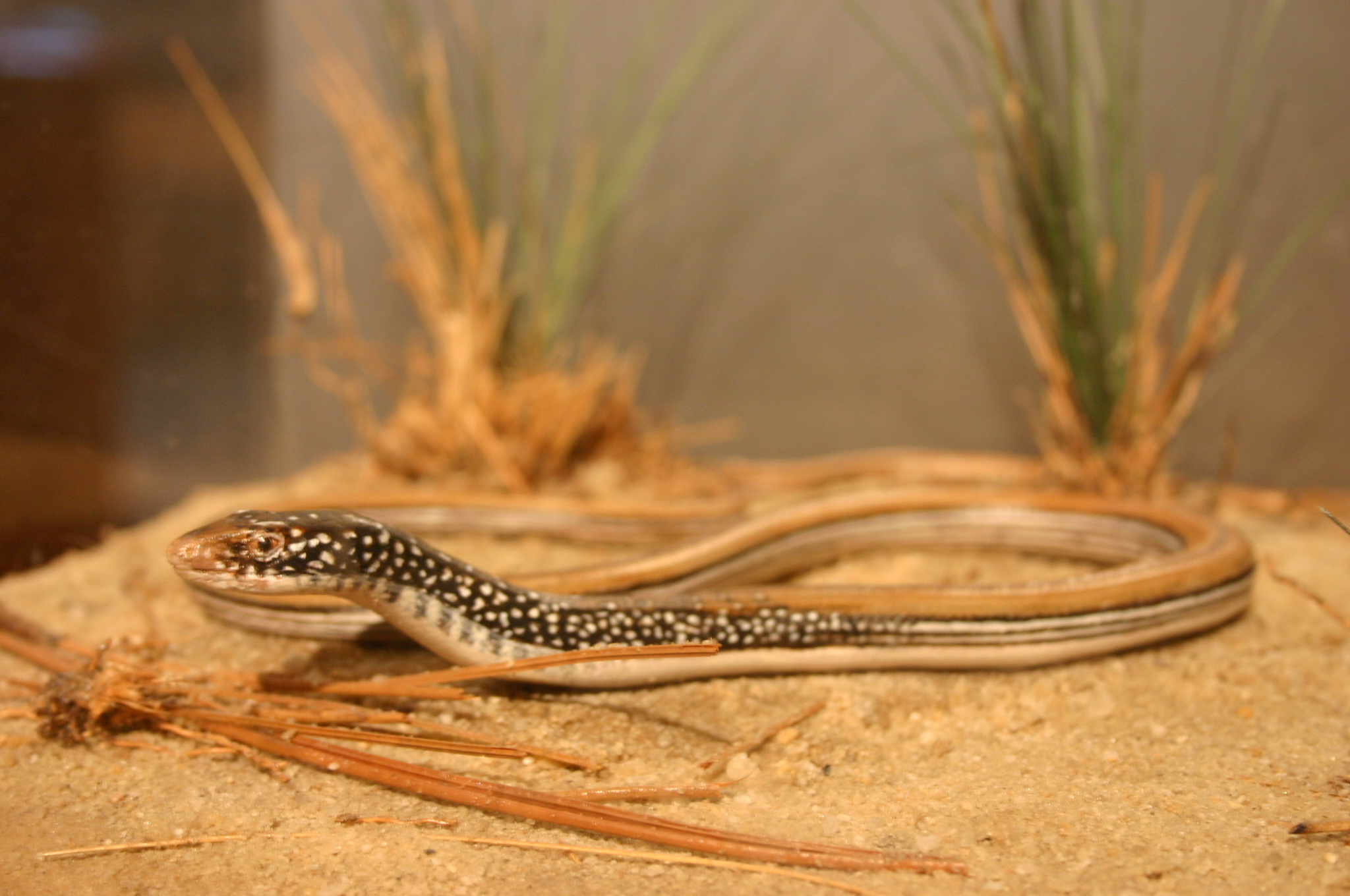
- Mimic glass lizard (Ophisaurus mimicus)
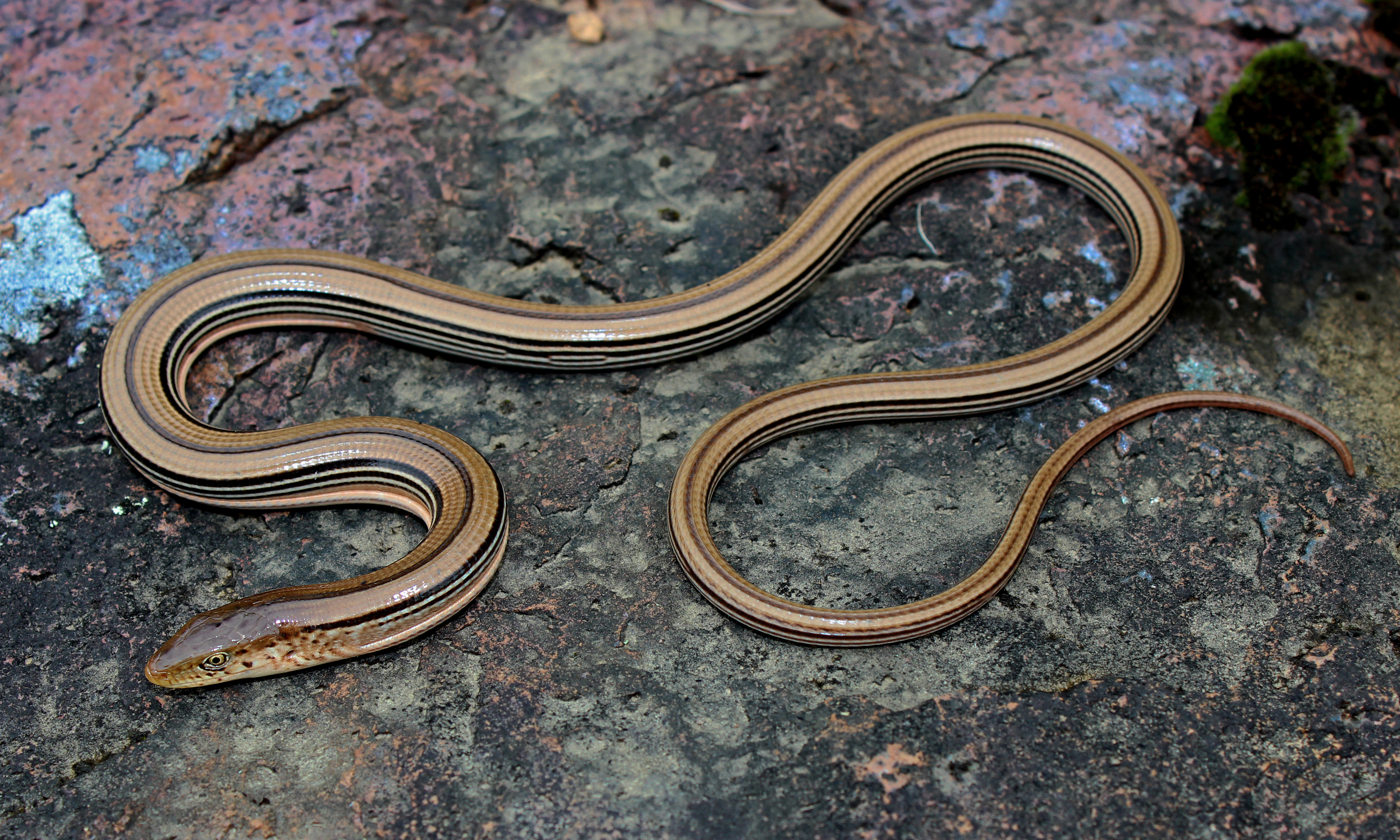
- Slender glass lizard (Ophisaurus attenuatus)

=== Amphisbaenids ===
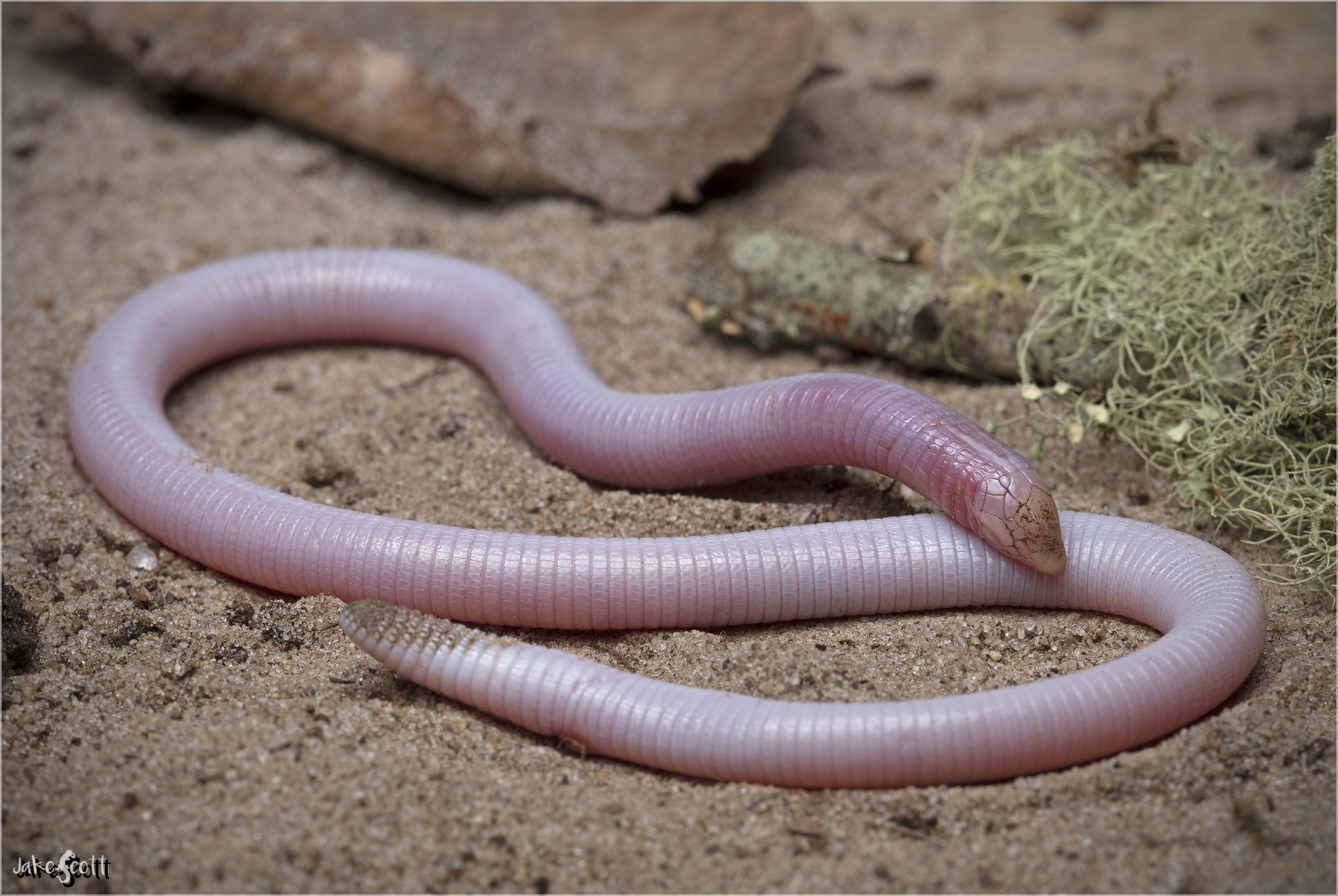
- Florida worm lizard

== Squamates (suborder Serpentes) ==
This suborder includes all kinds of snakes. There are many snakes in Florida, some venomous and others non-venomous, and unlike lizards, most are native. For photos of native snakes see List of snakes of Florida.

=== Blind snakes ===
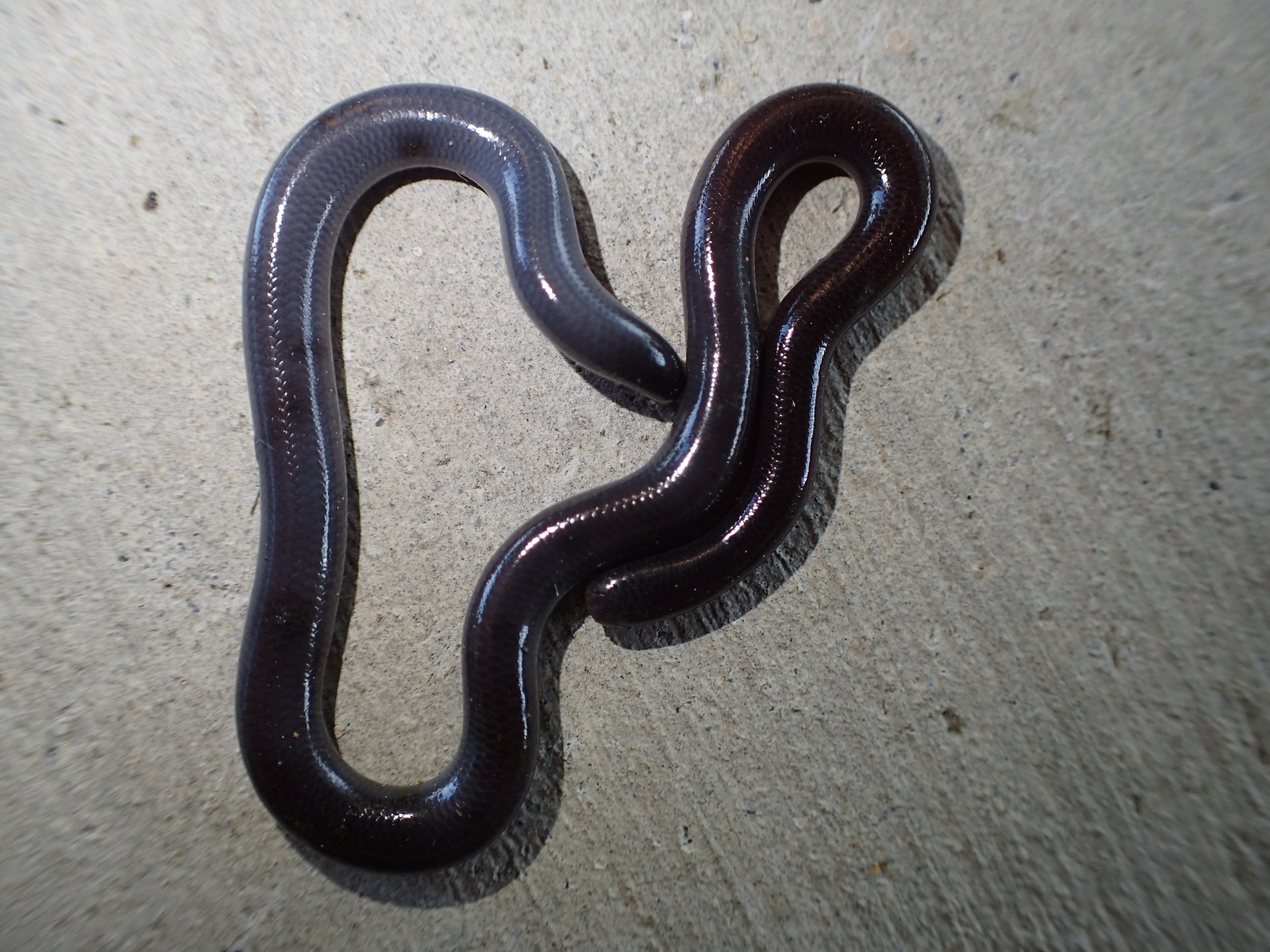
- Brahminy blind snake (Indotyphlops braminus) - introduced

=== Boidae ===
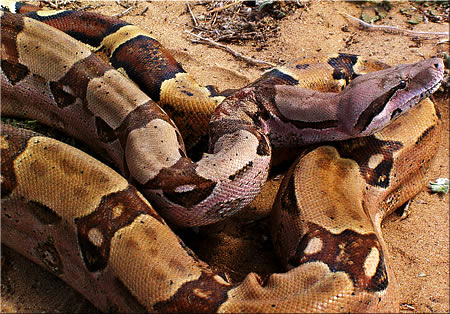
- Common boa (Boa constrictor) - introduced

=== Colubrids ===
- American brown snake (Storeria dekayi)
- Banded water snake (Nerodia fasciata)
- Black swampsnake (Liodytes pygaea)
- Brown water snake (Nerodia taxispilota)
- Central ratsnake (Pantherophis alleghaniensis)
- Coachwhip (Masticophis flagellum)
- Common garter snake (Thamnophis sirtalis)
- Common kingsnake (Lampropeltis getula)
- Corn snake (Pantherophis guttatus)
- Eastern hognose snake (Heterodon platirhinos)
- Eastern indigo snake (Drymarchon couperi)
- Eastern racer (Coluber constrictor)
- Florida crown snake (Tantilla relicta)
- Florida green water snake (Nerodia floridana)
- Glossy crayfish snake (Liodytes rigida)
- Green water snake (Nerodia cyclopion)
- Northern water snake (Nerodia sipedon)
- Mole kingsnake (Lampropeltis rhombomaculata)
- Mud snake (Farancia abacura)
- Pine snake (Pituophis melanoleucus)
- Pine woods snake (Rhadinaea flavilata)
- Plainbelly water snake (Nerodia erythrogaster)
- Queen snake (Regina septemvittata)
- Rainbow snake (Farancia erytrogramma)
- Redbelly snake (Storeria occipitomaculata)
- Ribbon snake (Thamnophis saurita)
- Rim rock crown snake (Tantilla oolitica)
- Ringneck snake (Diadophis punctatus)
- Rough earth snake (Virginia striatula)
- Rough green snake (Opheodrys aestivus)
- Salt marsh snake (Nerodia clarkii)
- Scarlet kingsnake (Lampropeltis elapsoides)
- Scarlet snake (Cemophora coccinea)
- Short-tailed snake (Lampropeltis extenuata)
- Smooth earth snake (Virginia valeriae)
- Southeastern crown snake (Tantilla coronata)
- Southern hognose snake (Heterodon simus)
- South Florida mole kingsnake (Lampropeltis occipitolineata)
- Striped crayfish snake (Liodytes alleni)
- Yellow ratsnake (Pantherophis quadrivittatus)

=== Elapids ===
- Eastern coral snake (Micrurus fulvius)

=== Pythons ===
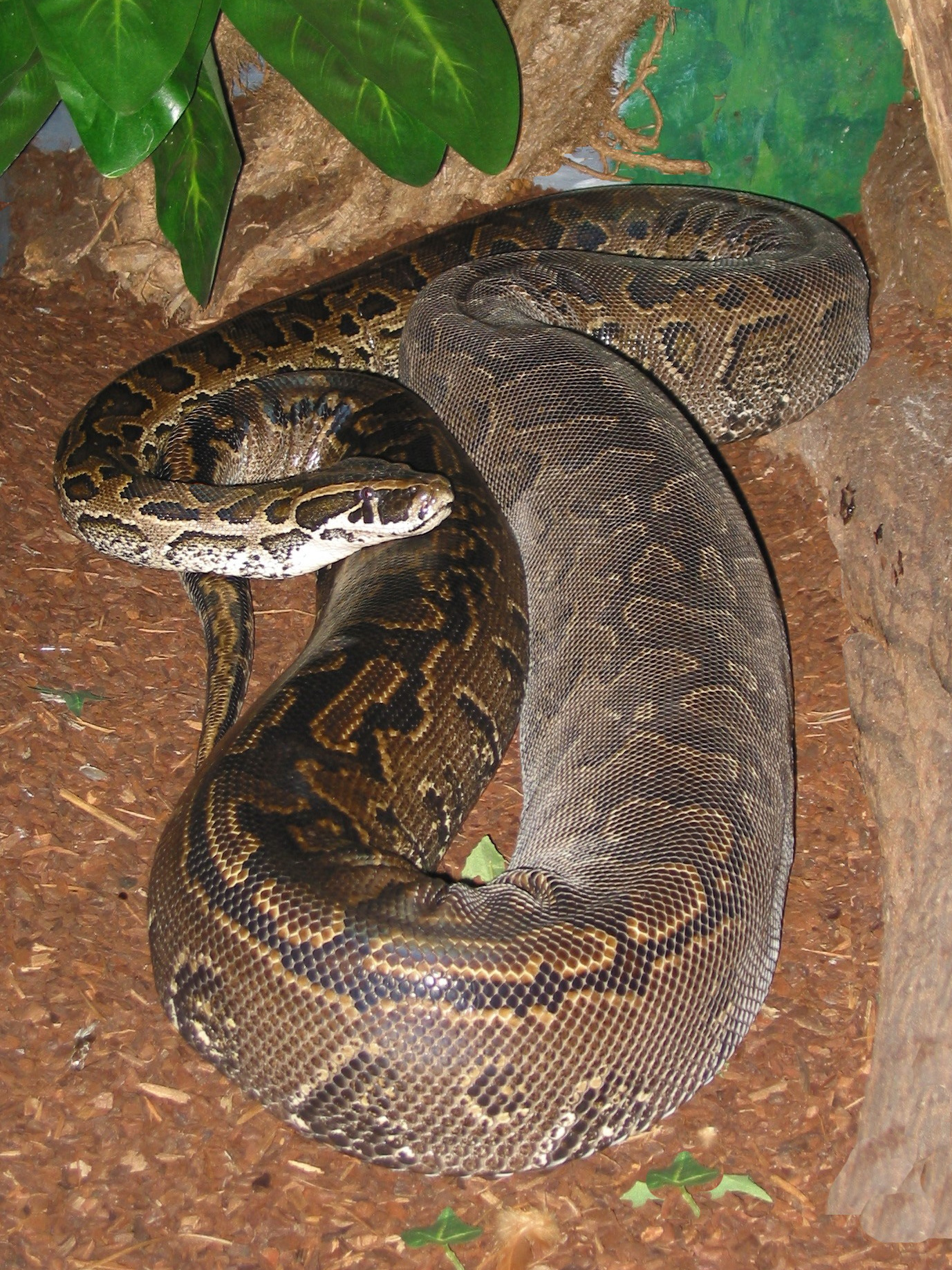
- African rock python (Python sebae) - introduced
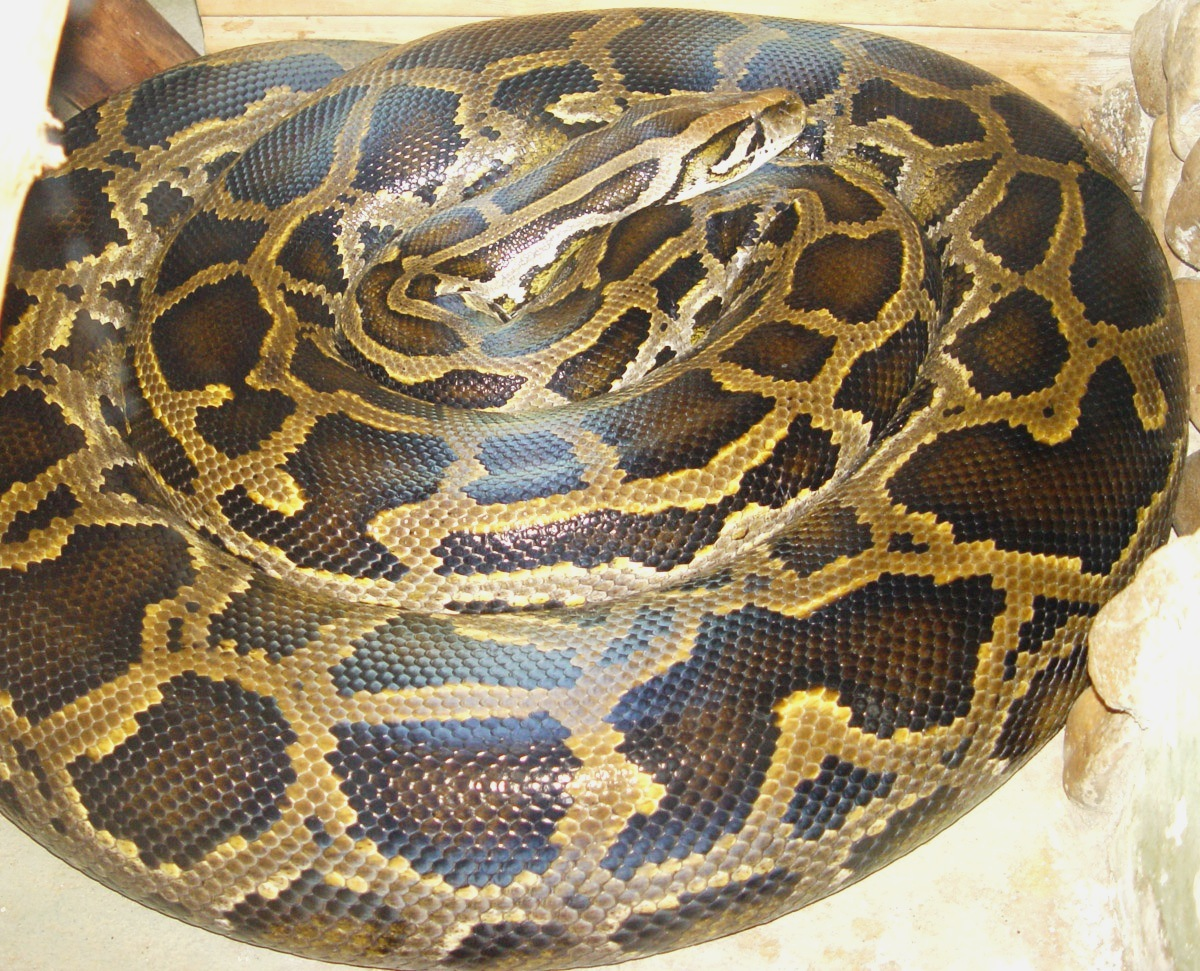
- Burmese python (Python bivittatus) - introduced

=== Vipers ===
- Cottonmouth (Agkistrodon piscivorus)
- Eastern diamondback rattlesnake (Crotalus adamanteus)
- Florida cottonmouth (Agkistrodon conanti)
- Pygmy rattlesnake (Sistrurus miliarius)
- Southern copperhead (Agkistrodon contortrix)
- Timber rattlesnake (Crotalus horridus)

== See also ==
- List of amphibians of Florida
- List of birds of Florida
- List of mammals of Florida
- List of snakes of Florida
- List of invasive species in Florida
- List of invasive species in the Everglades
- Fauna of Florida

== Sources ==
- Reptile Database
- Florida Herpetology Center
- Invasive reptiles
- Invasive
