= List of snakes of Florida =

This list of snakes of Florida includes all native snakes in the U.S. state of Florida.

== Non-venomous ==
=== Racers (Coluber) ===
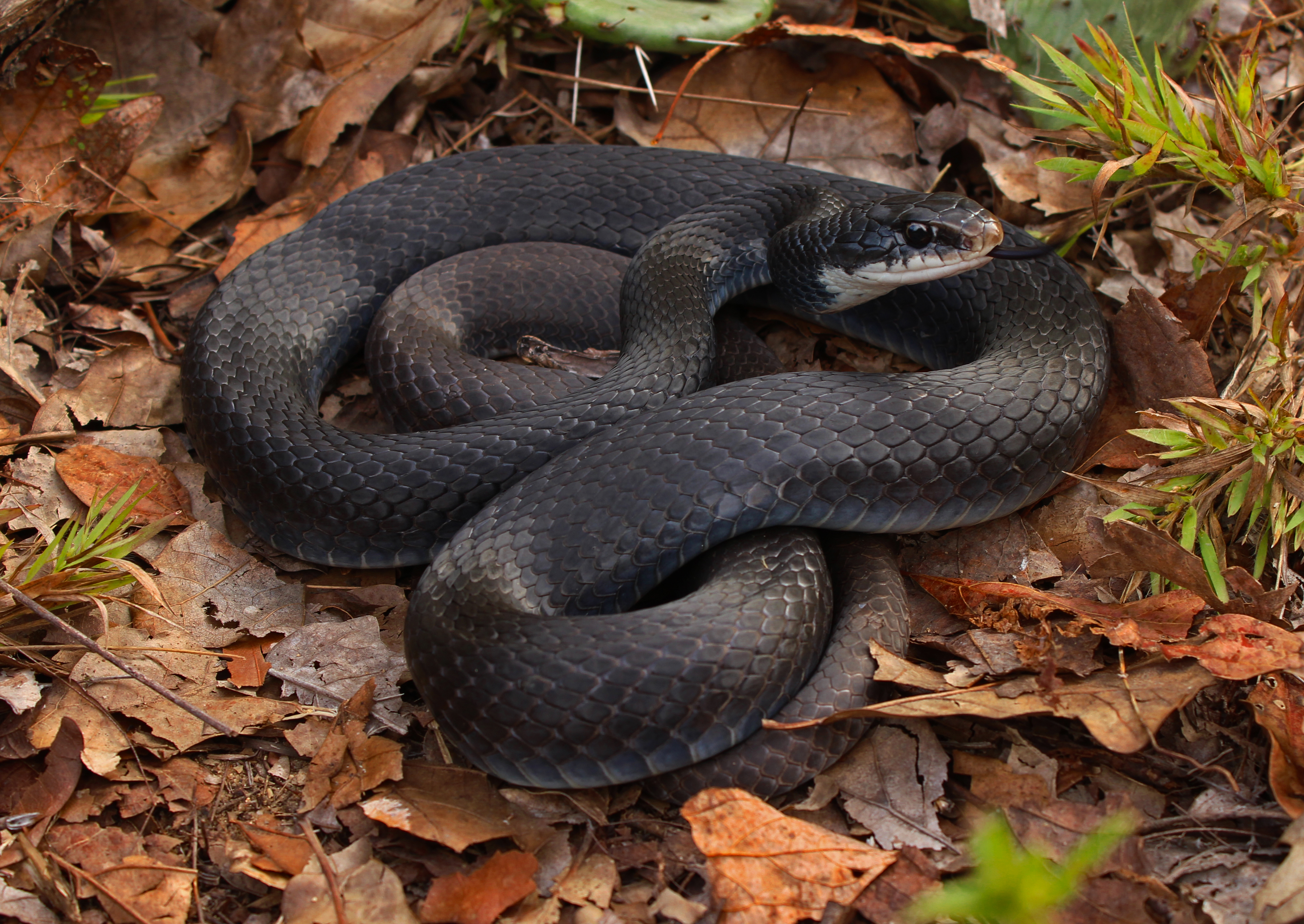
- Southern black racer (Coluber constrictor priapus)

=== Coachwhips (Masticophis) ===
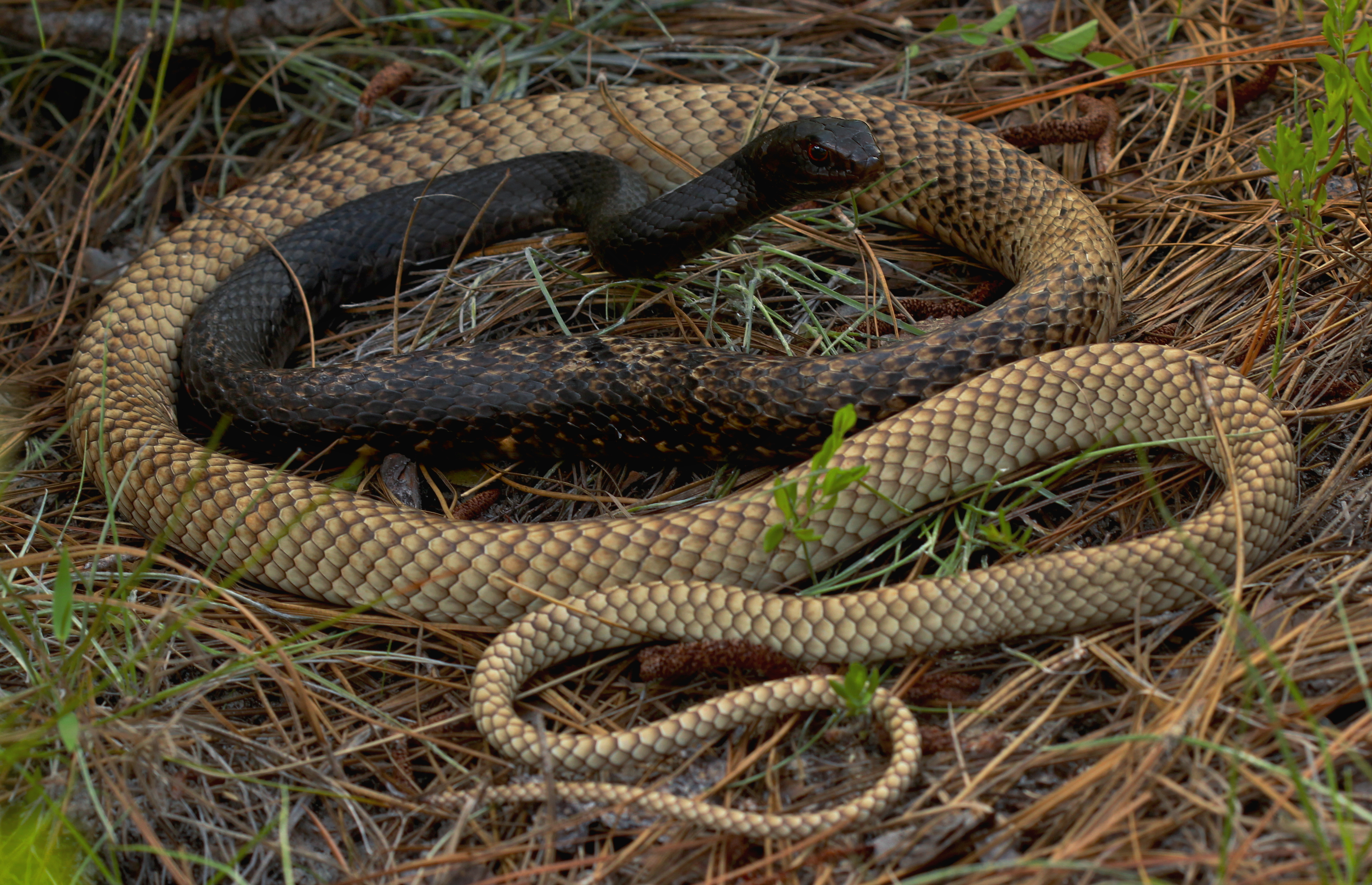
- Eastern coachwhip (Masticophis flagellum flagellum)

=== Brown snakes (Storeria) ===
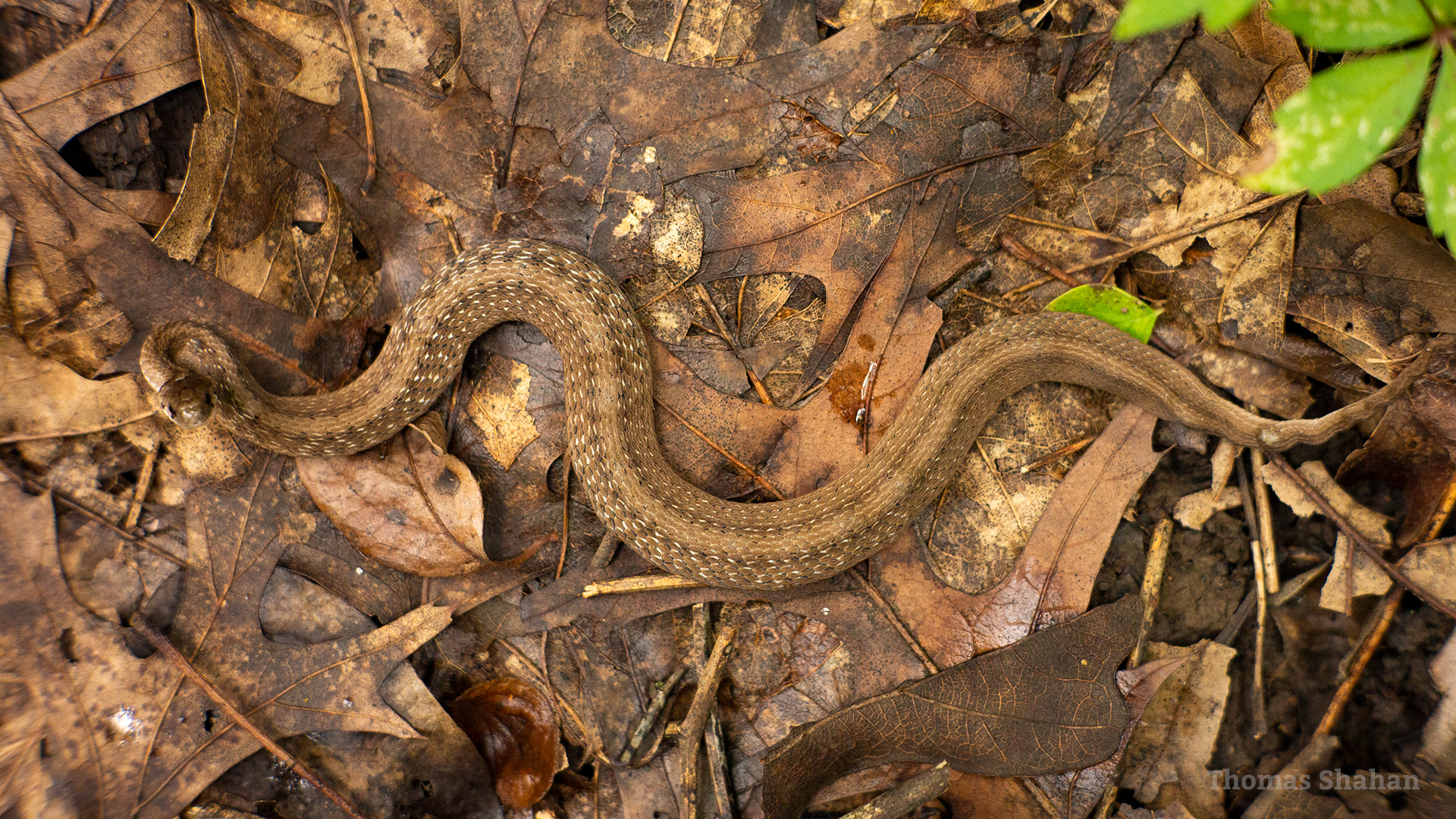
- Dekay's brown snake (Storeria dekayi)
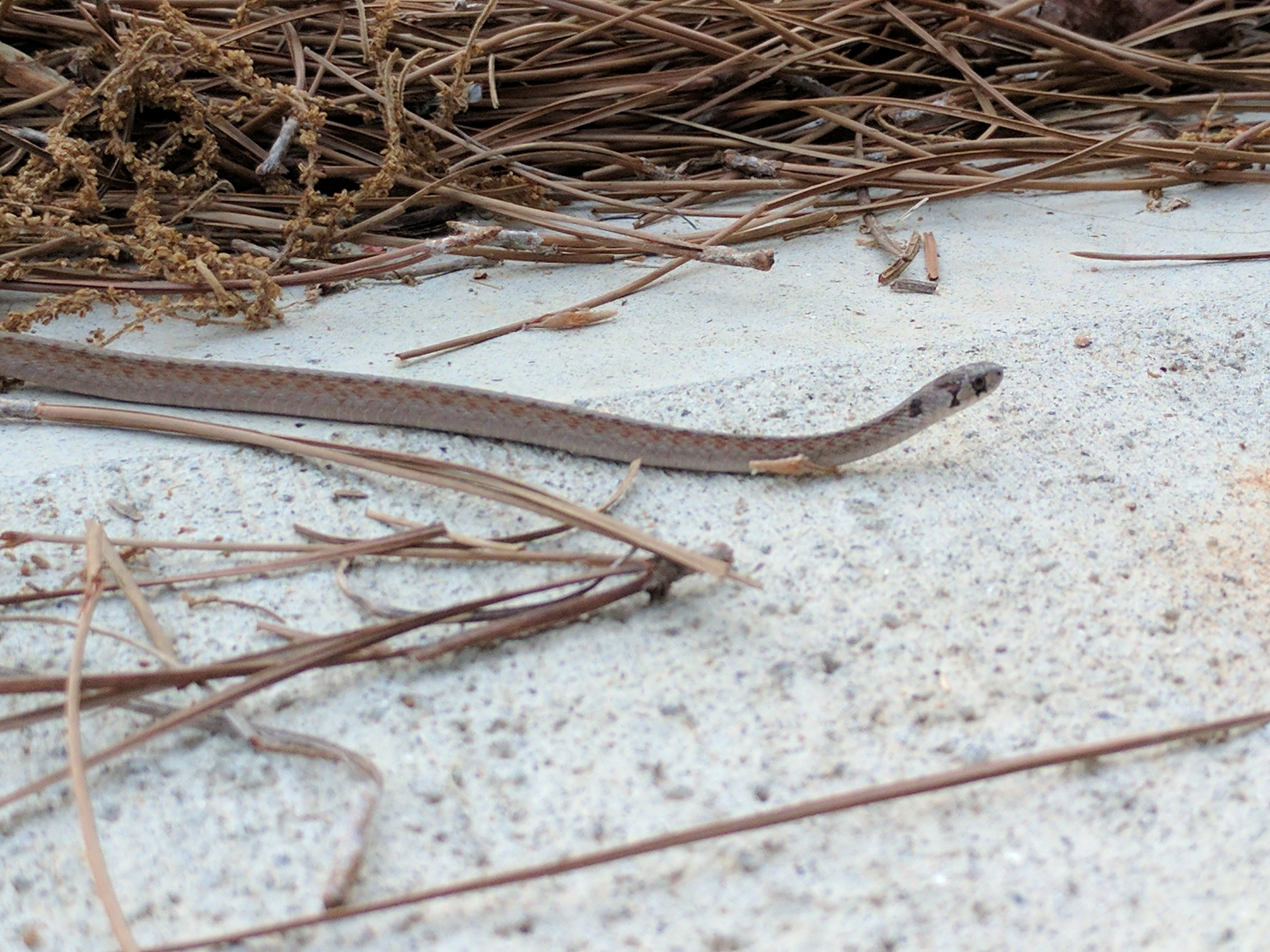
- Florida brown snake (Storeria victa)
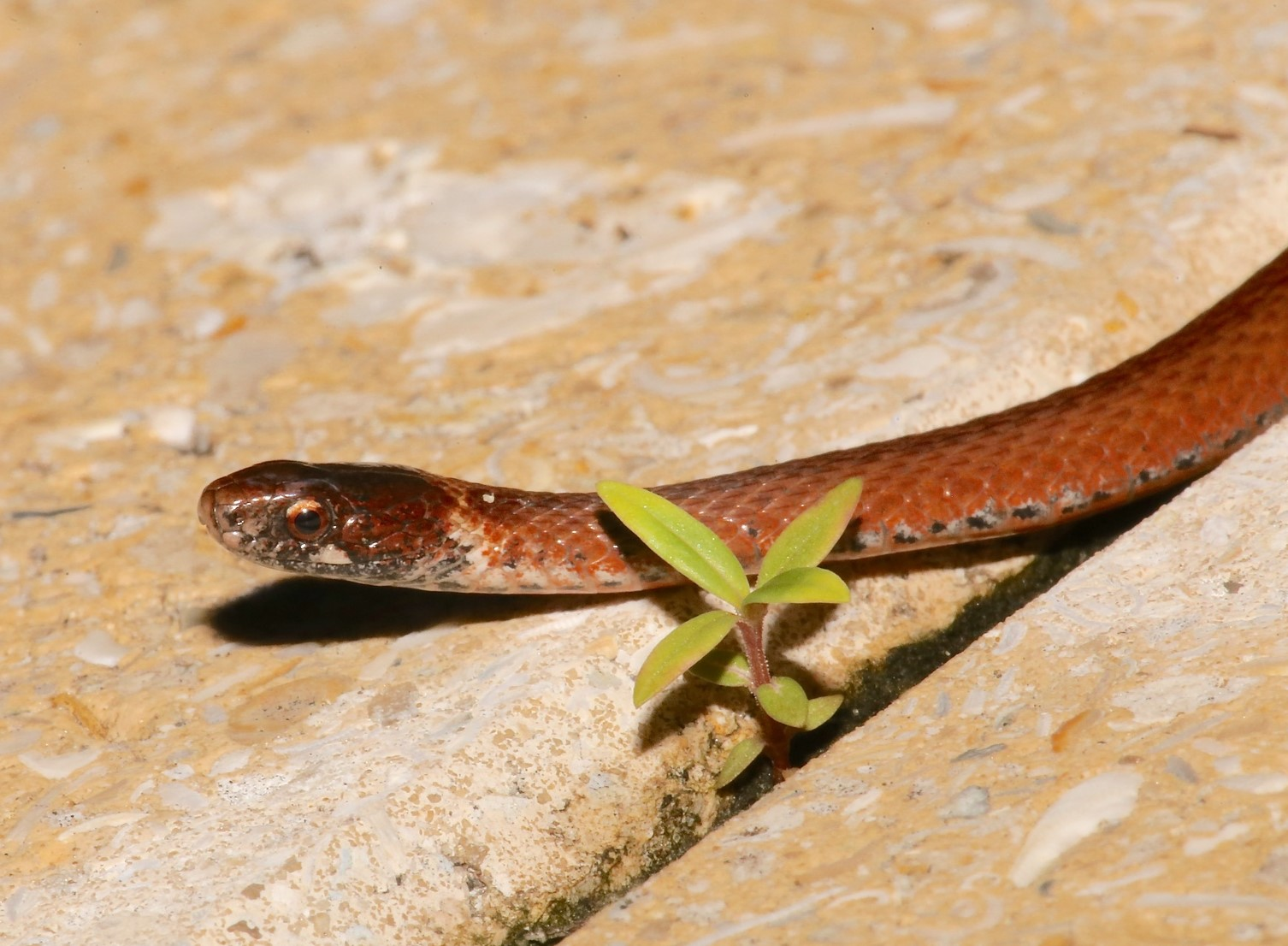
- Florida redbelly snake (Storeria occipitomaculata obscura)

=== Swamp snakes (Liodytes) ===
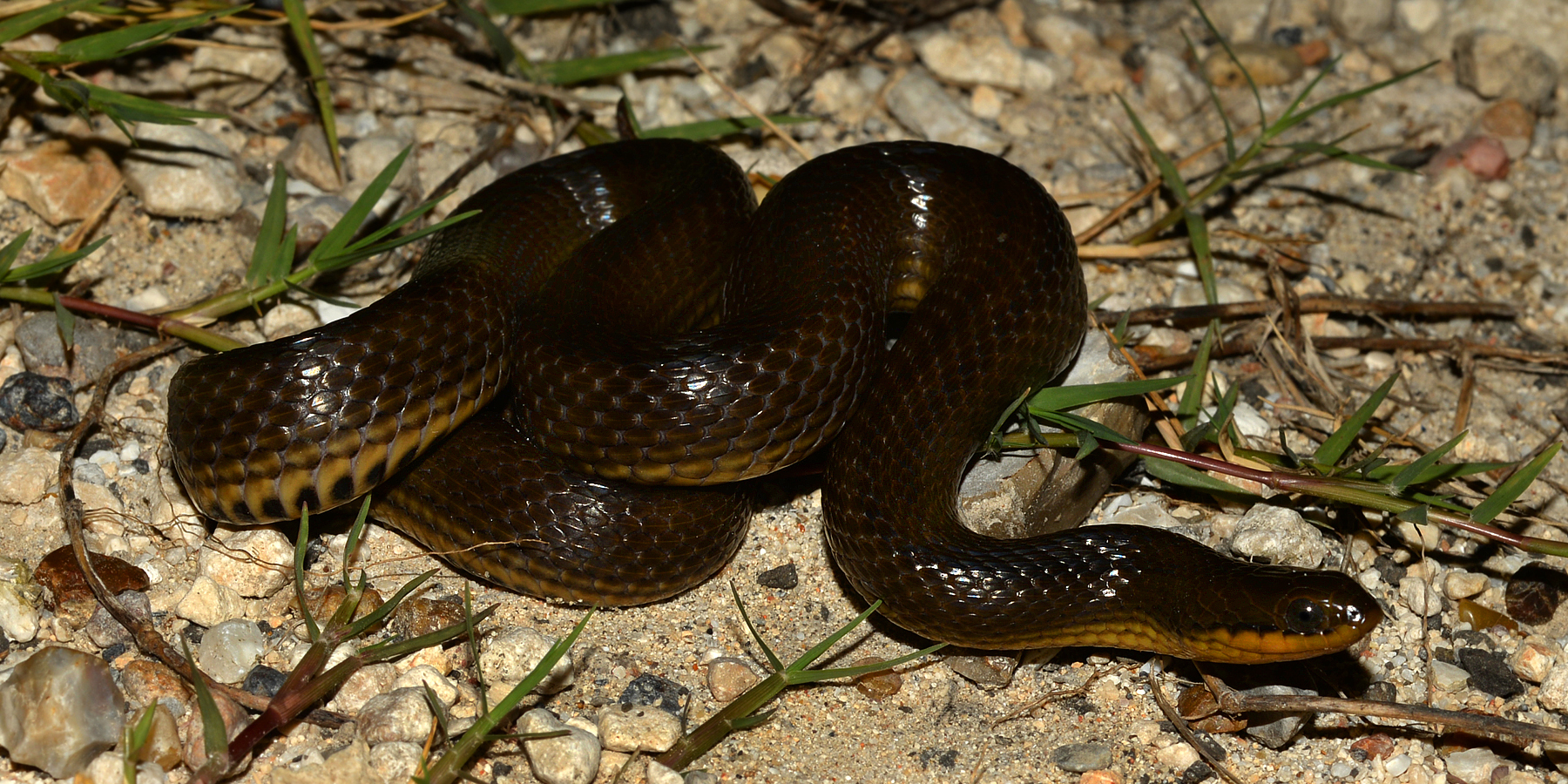
- Glossy swampsnake (Liodytes rigida)
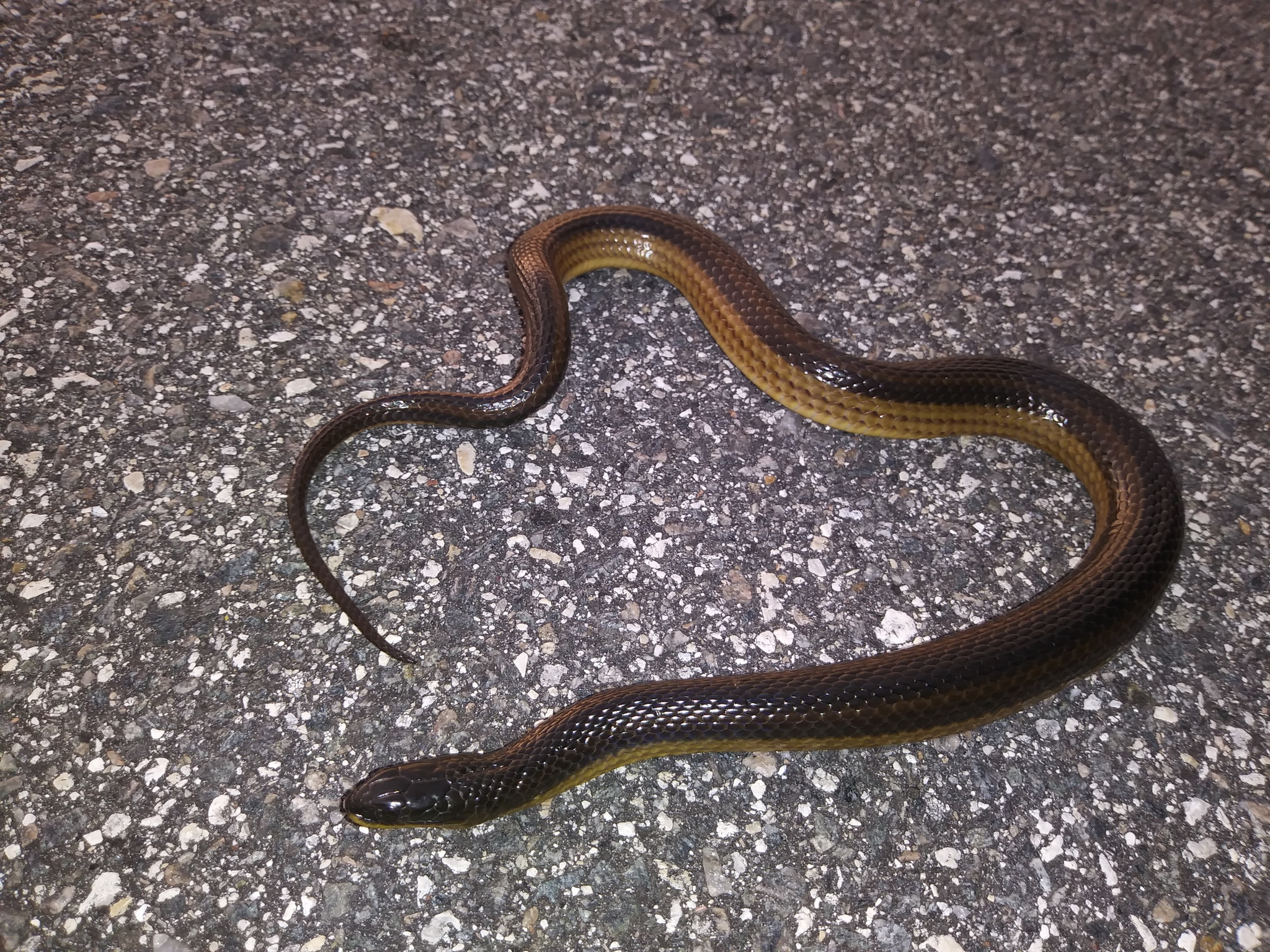
- Striped swampsnake (Liodytes alleni)
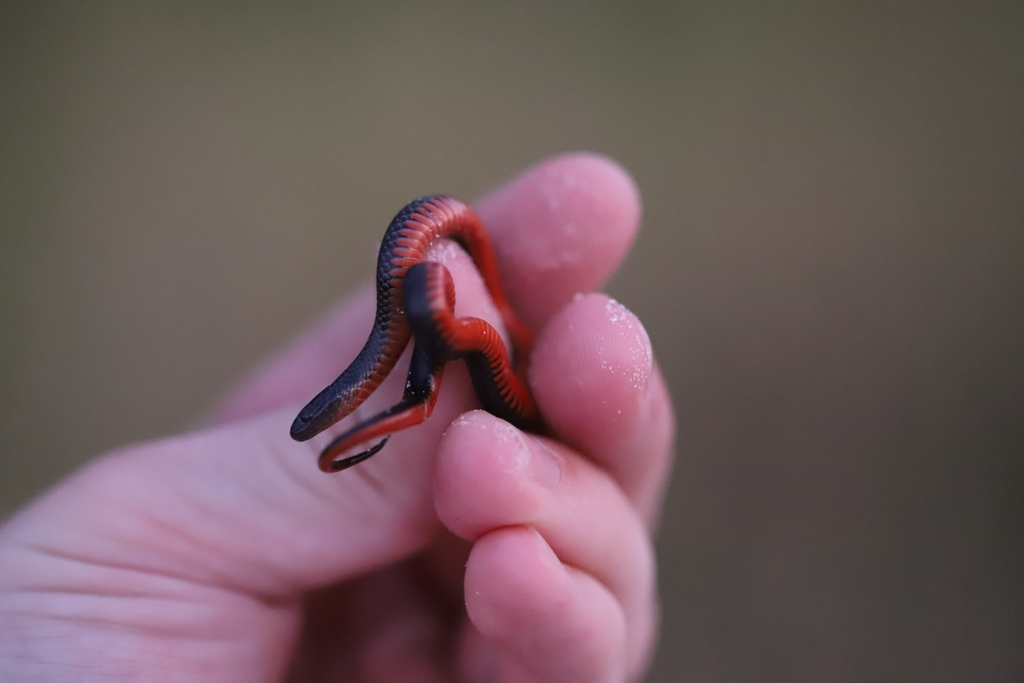
- Black swampsnake (Liodytes pygaea)

=== Crayfish snakes (Regina) ===
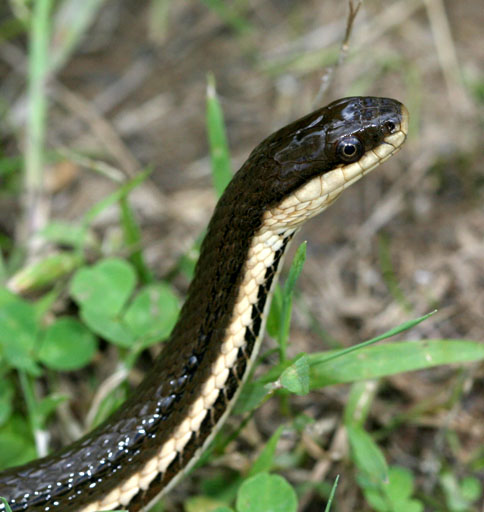
- Queen snake (Regina septemvittata)

=== Crowned snakes (Tantilla) ===
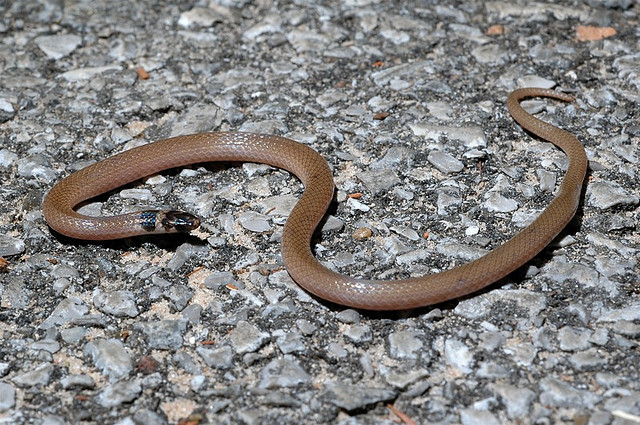
- Southeastern crown snake (Tantilla coronata)
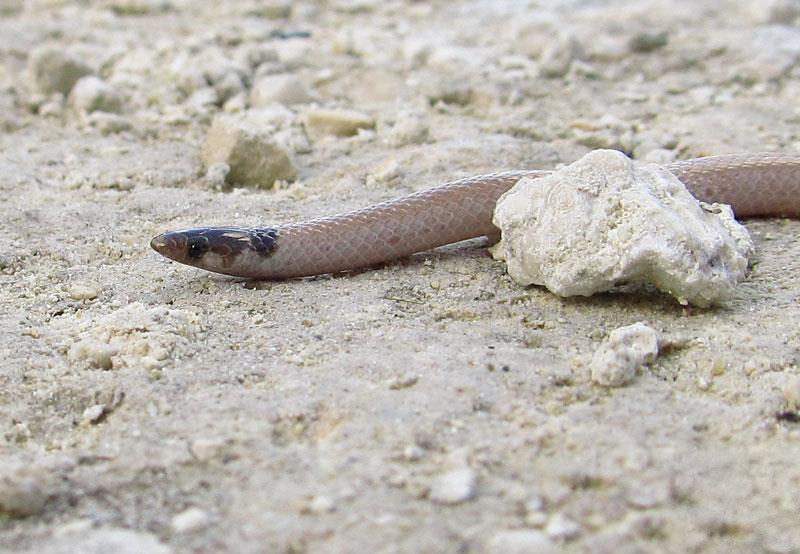
- Florida crowned snake (Tantilla relicta)
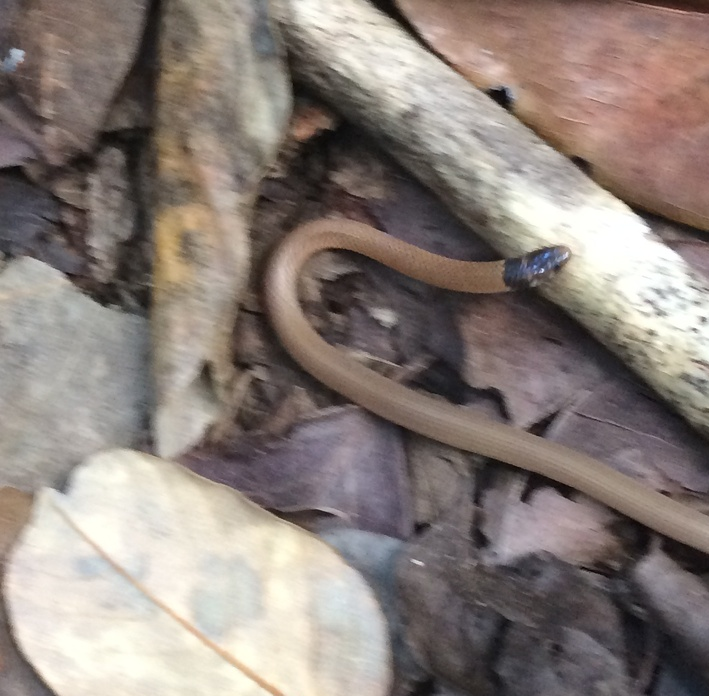
- Rim rock crowned snake (Tantilla oolitica)

=== Earth snakes (Virginia) ===
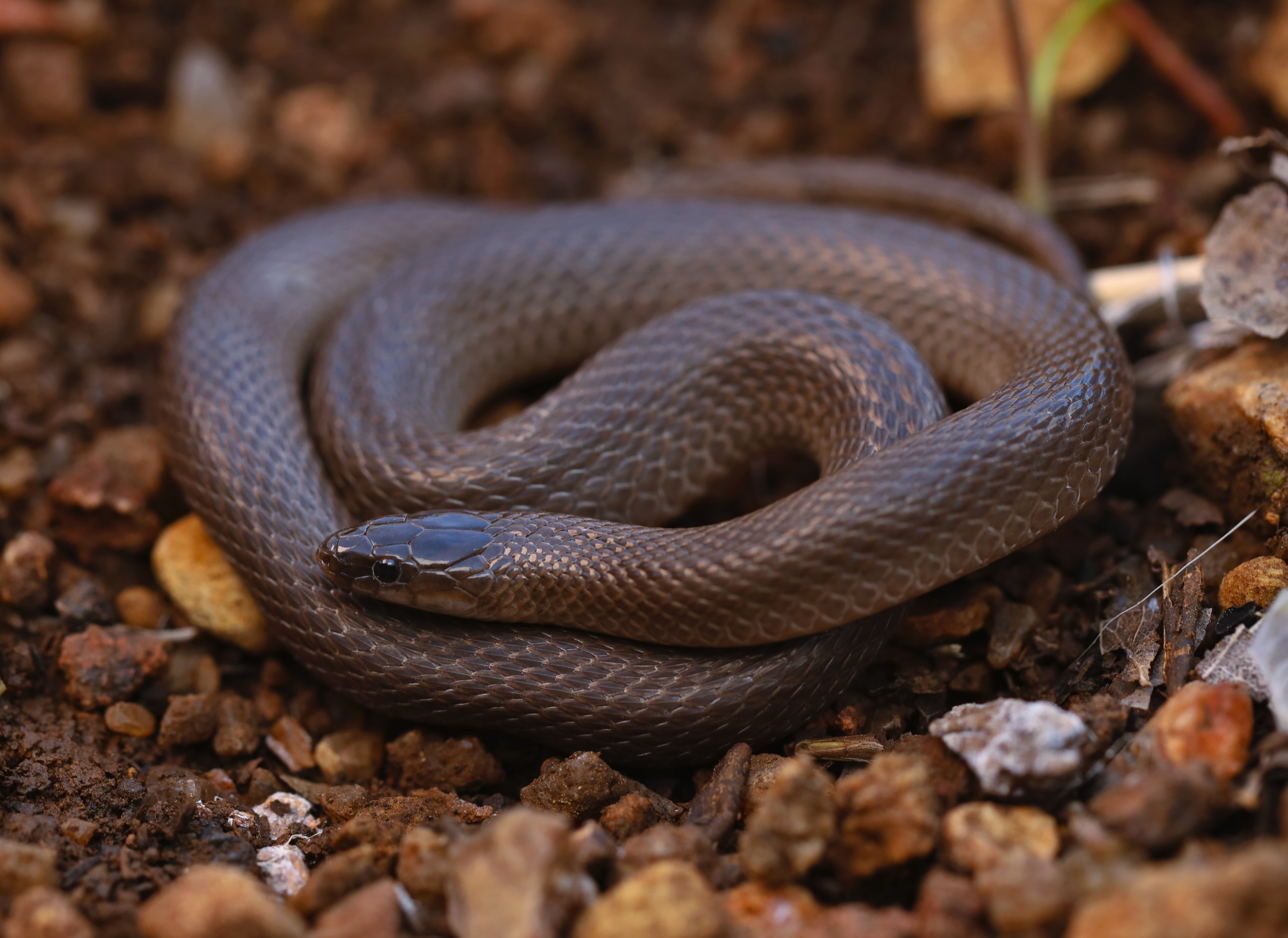
Rough earthsnake (Virginia striatula)

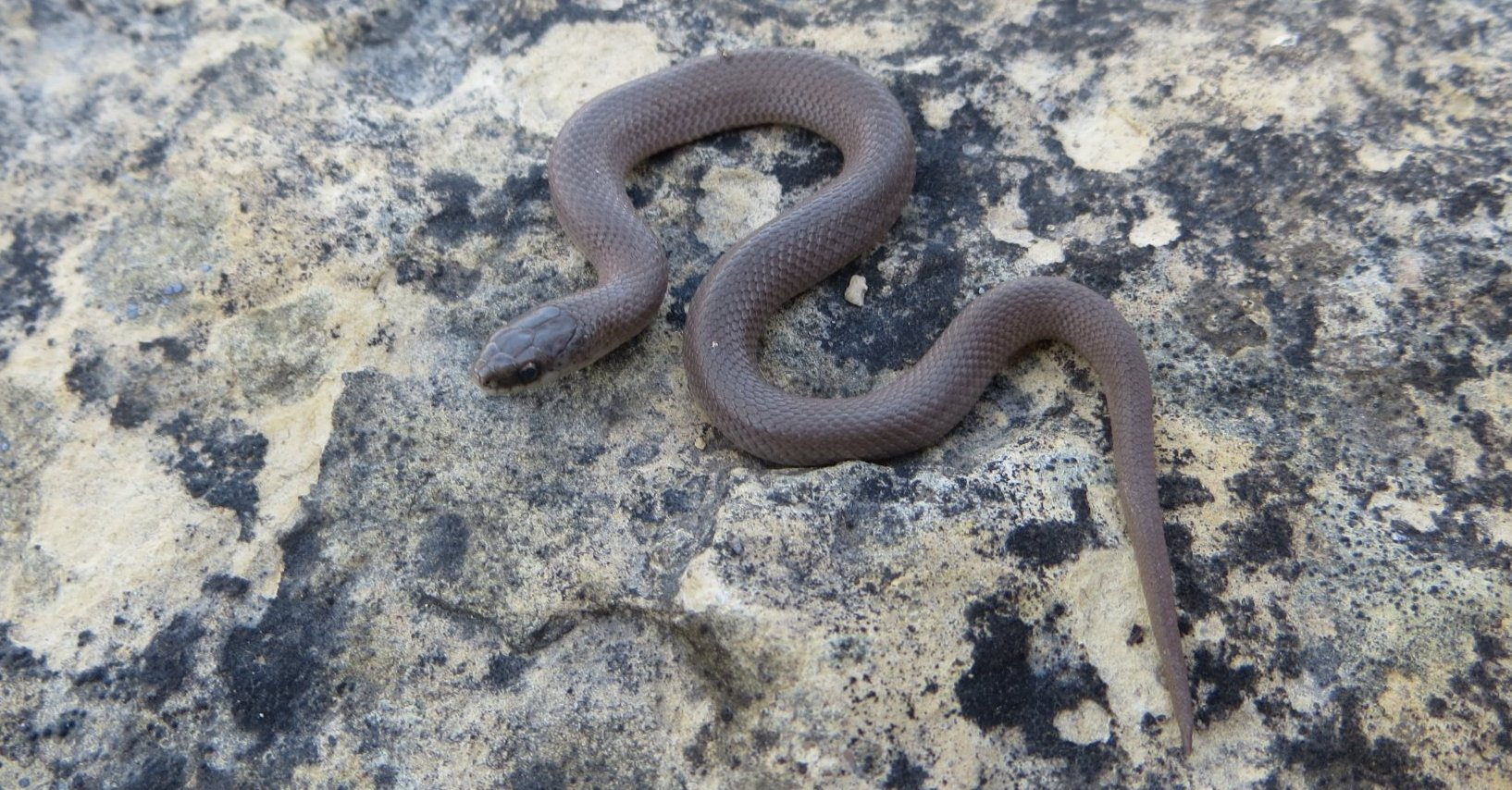
Smooth earthsnake (Virginia valeriae)

=== Garter snakes (Thamnophis) ===
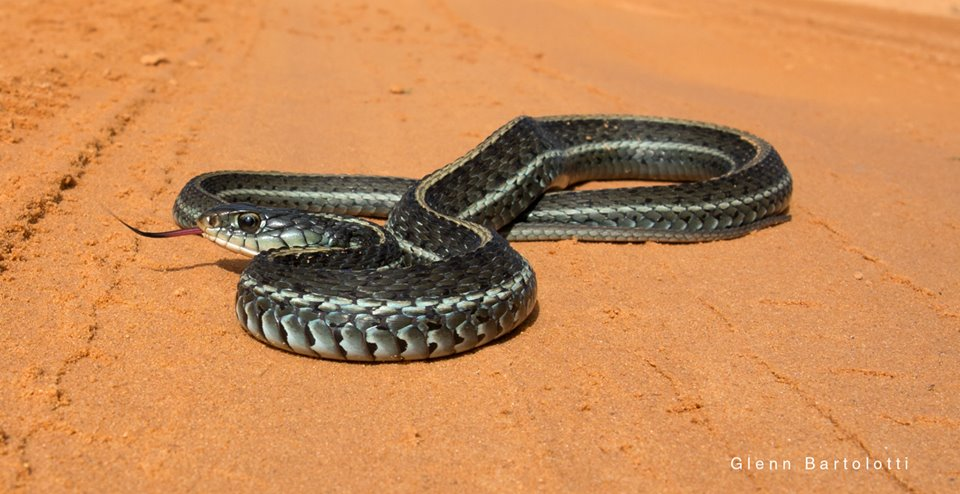
- Common garter snake (Thamnophis sirtalis)
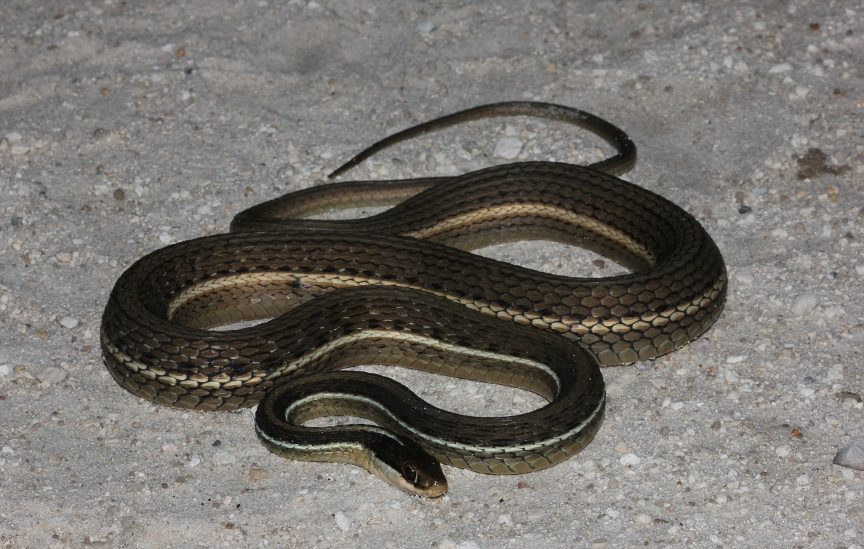
- Southern ribbon snake (Thamnophis saurita sackenii)

=== Green snakes (Opheodrys) ===
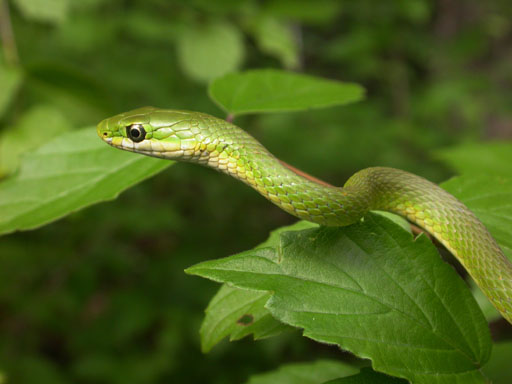
- Rough green snake (Opheodrys aestivus)

=== Hognose snakes (Heterodon) ===
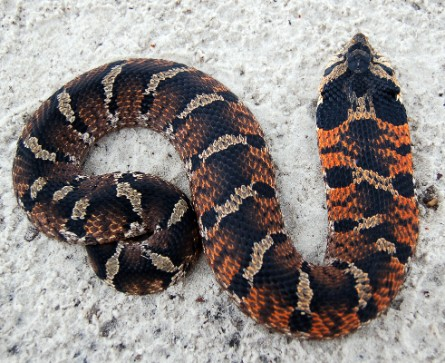
- Eastern hognose snake (Heterodon platirhinos)
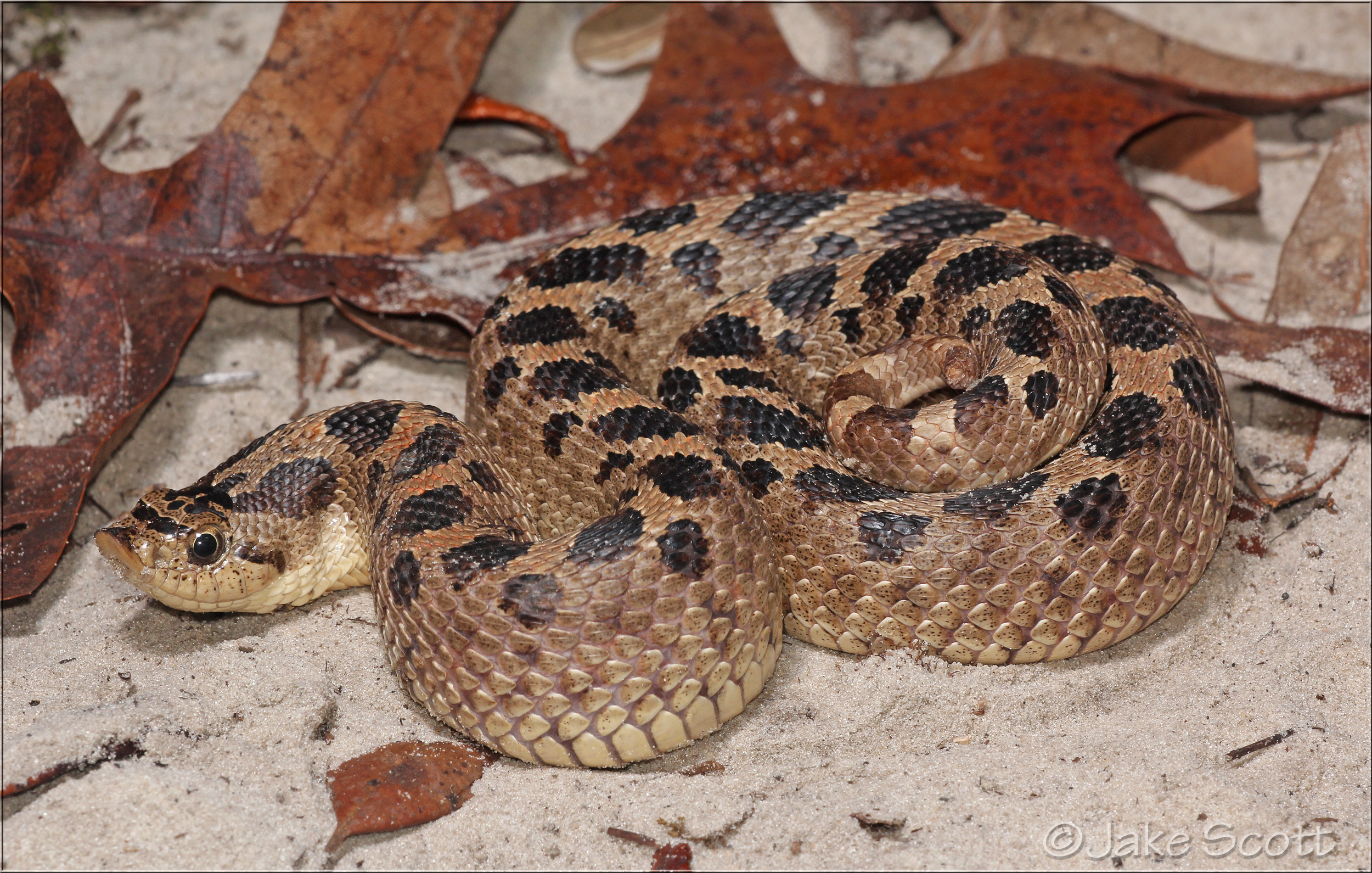
- Southern hognose snake (Heterodon simus)

=== Indigo snakes (Drymarchon) ===
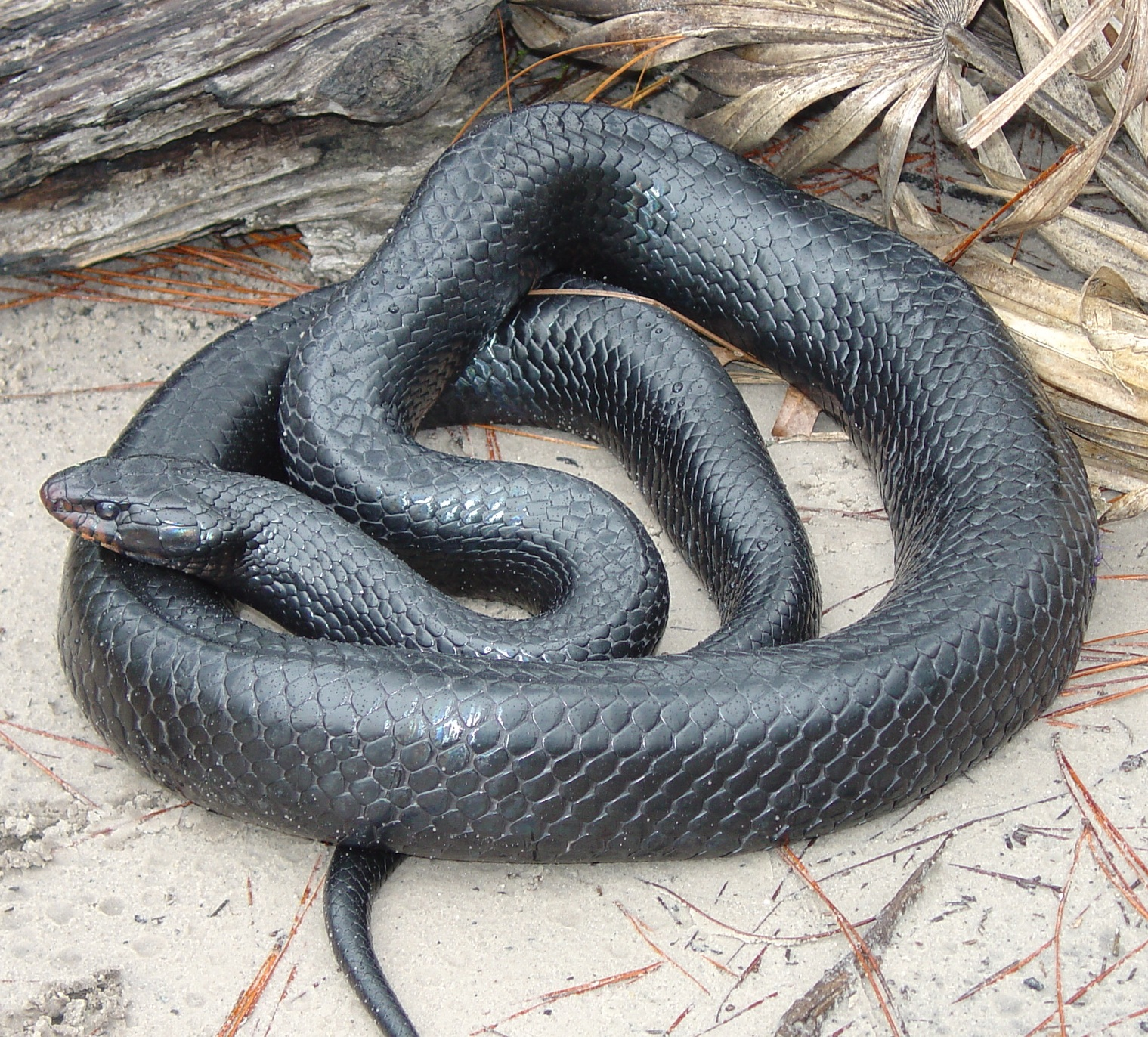
- Eastern indigo snake (Drymarchon couperi)

=== Kingsnakes (Lampropeltis) ===
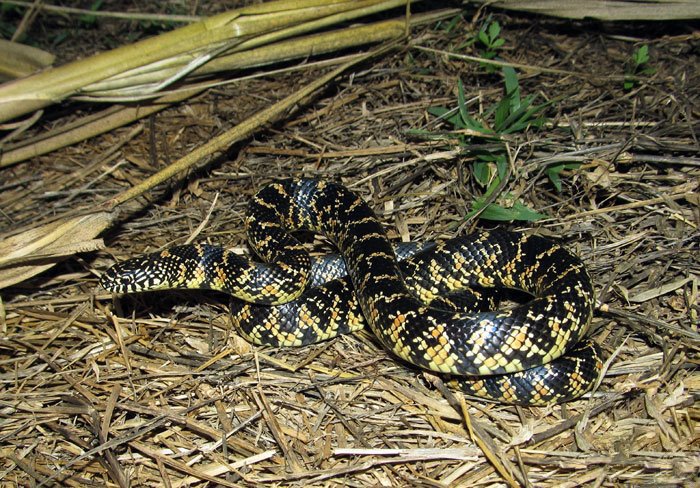
- Florida kingsnake (Lampropeltis getula floridana)
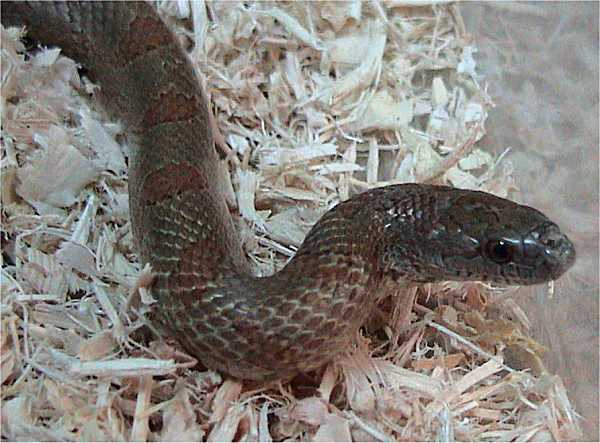
- Mole kingsnake (Lampropeltis rhombomaculata)
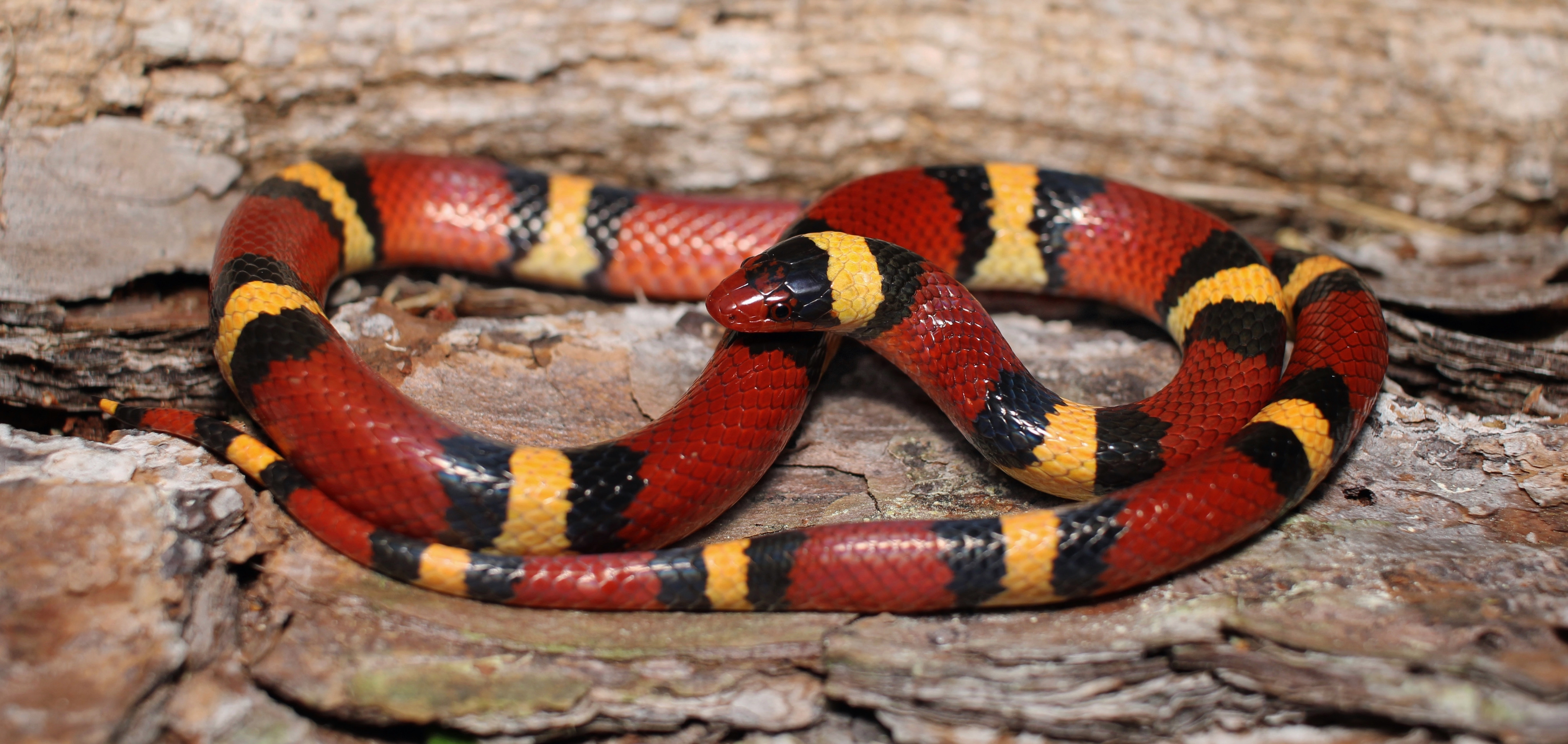
- Scarlet kingsnake (Lampropeltis elapsoides)
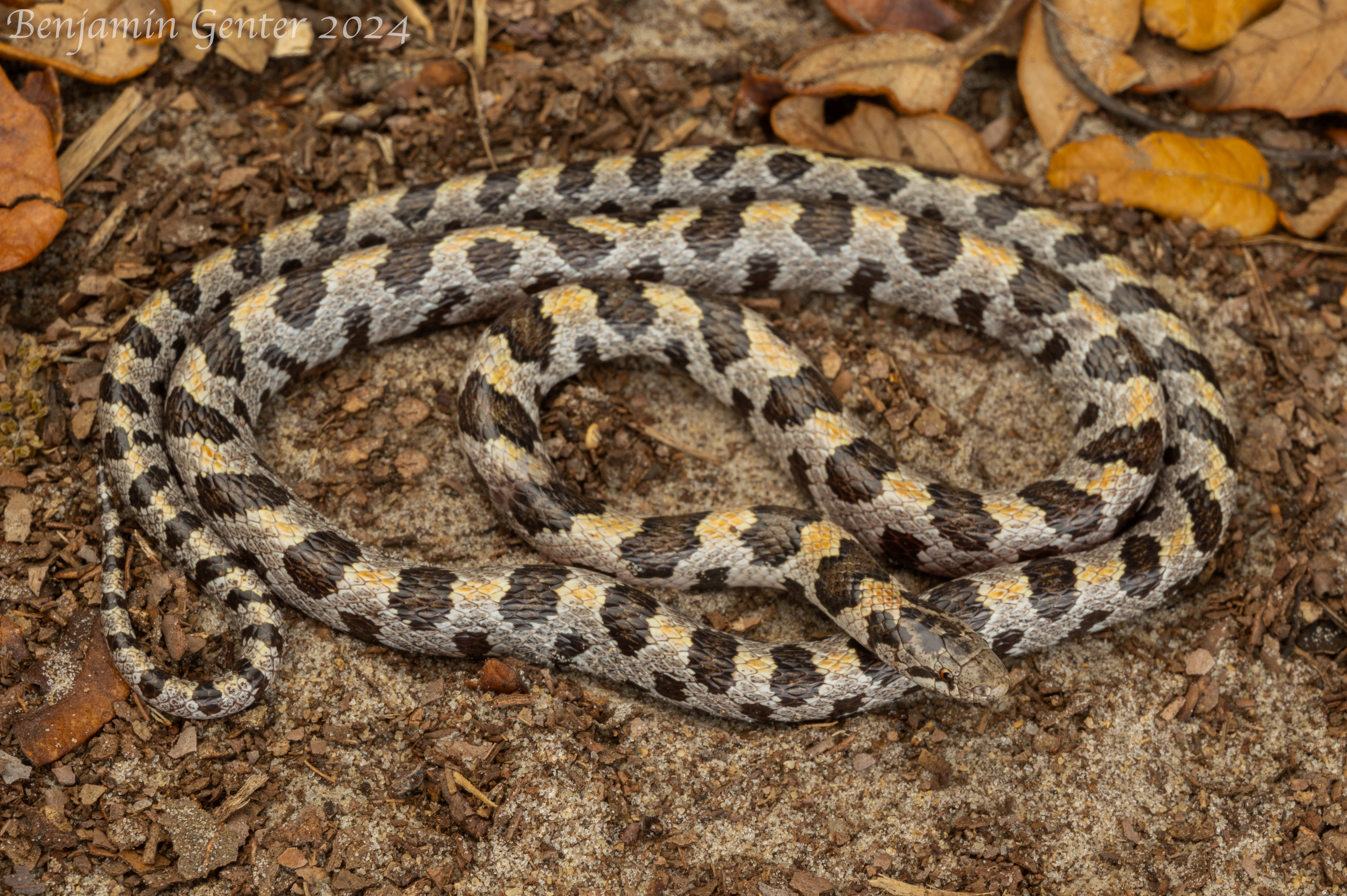
- Short-tailed snake (Lampropeltis extenuata)
- South Florida mole kingsnake (Lampropeltis occipitolineata)

=== Rainbow snakes (Farancia) ===
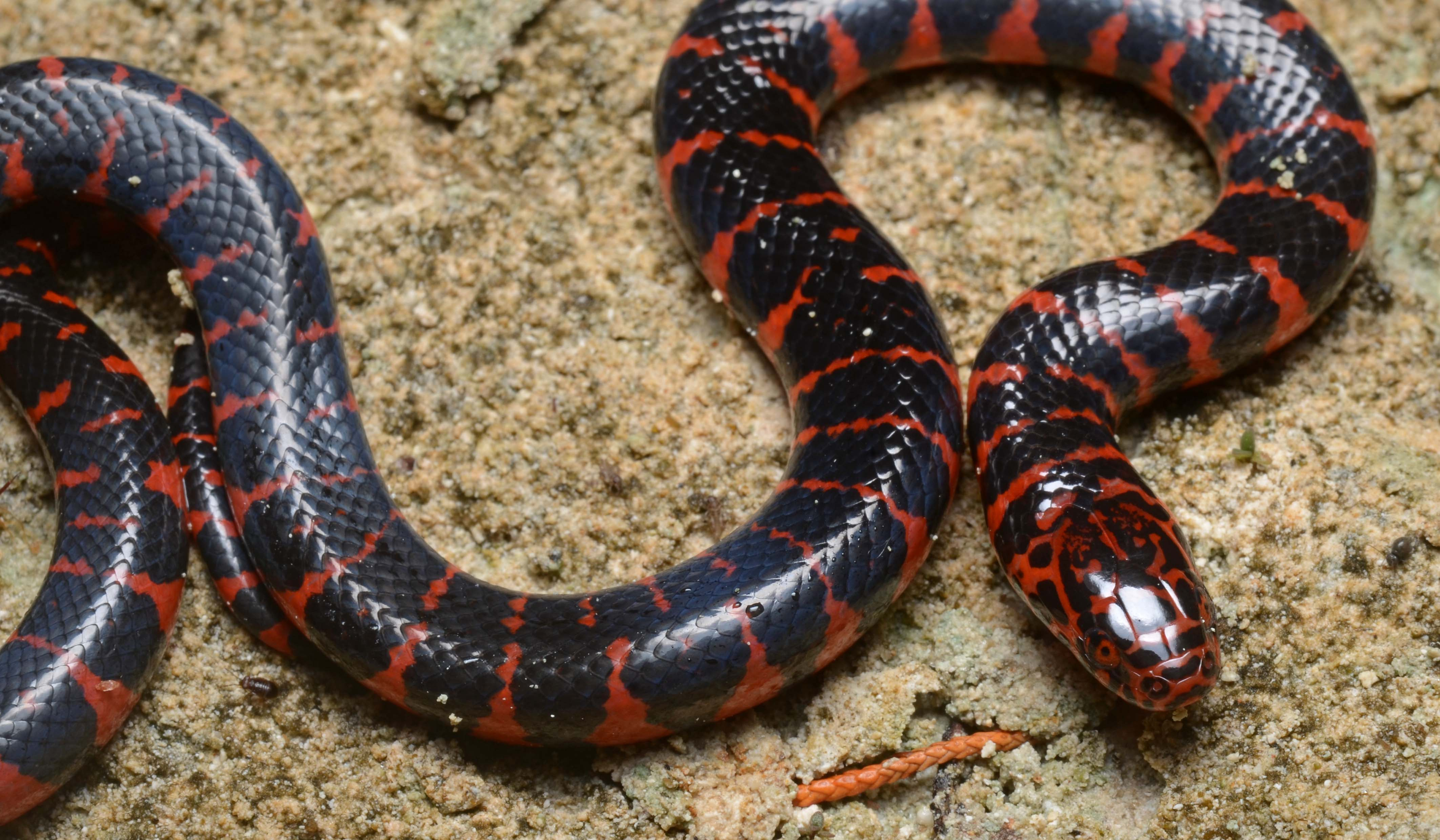
- Mud snake (Farancia abacura)
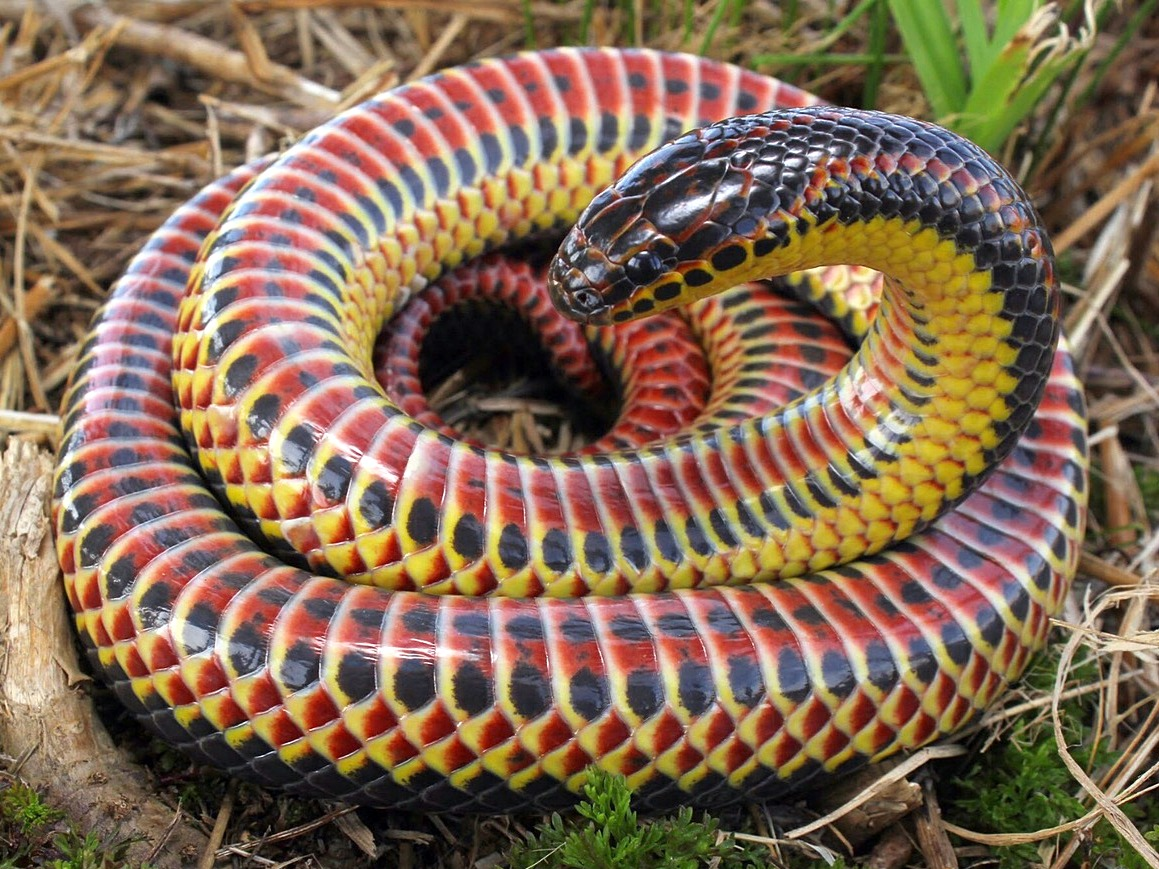
- Rainbow snake (Farancia erytrogramma)

=== Pine snakes (Pituophis) ===
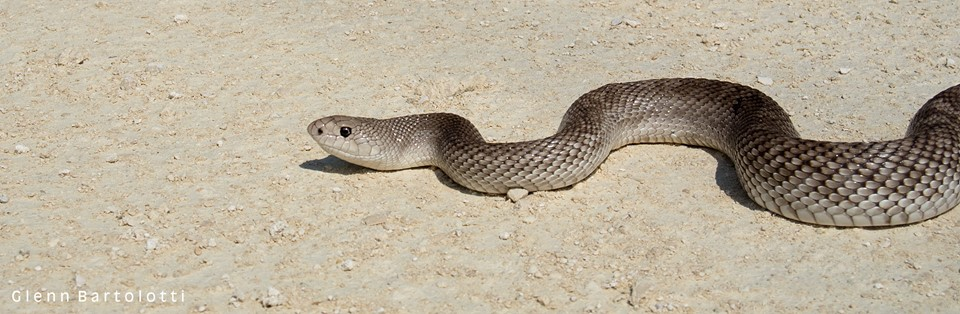
- Pine snake (Pituophis melanolecus)

=== Pine Woods snake (Rhadinea) ===
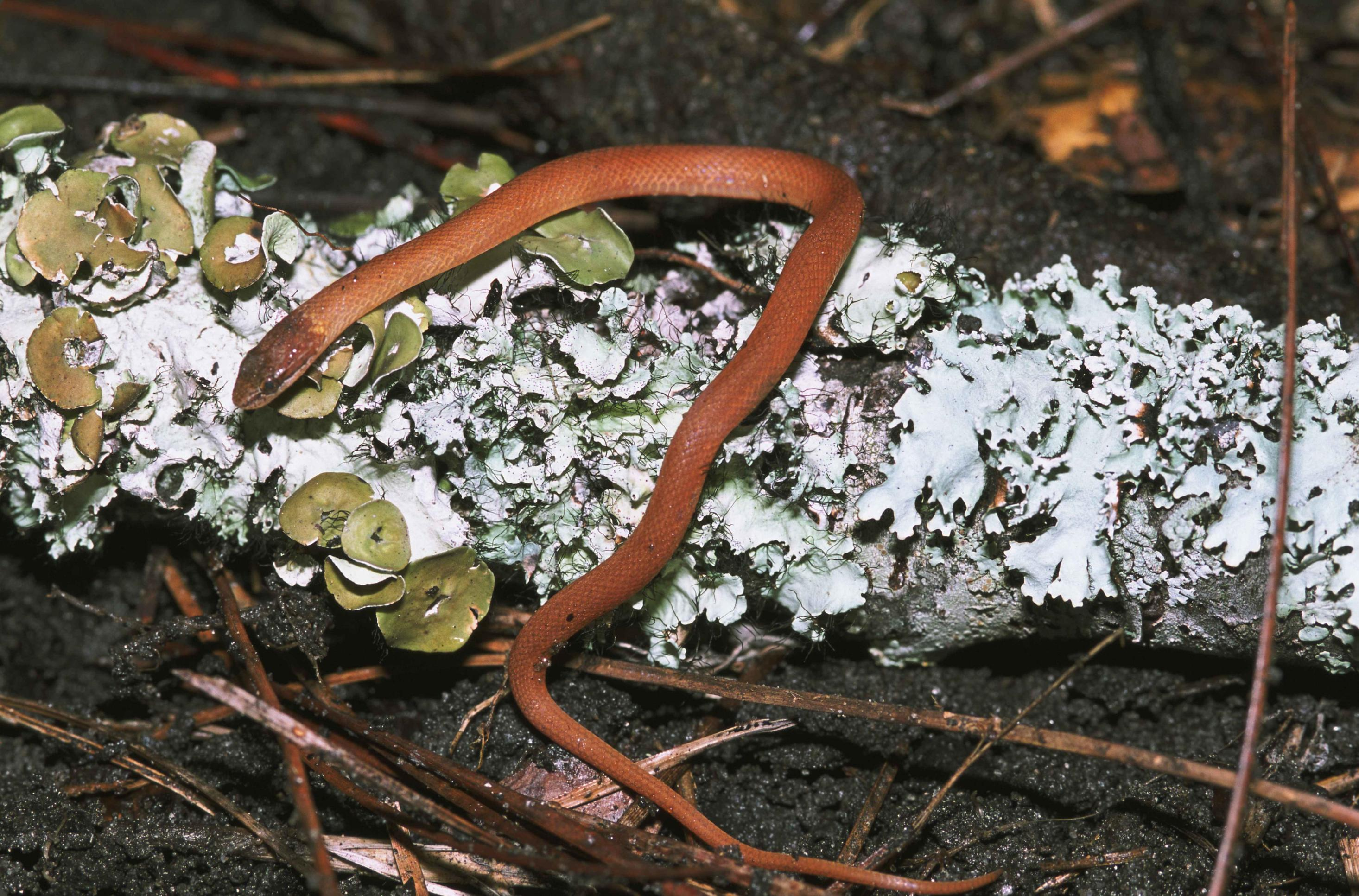
- Pine woods snake (Rhadinaea flavilata)

=== Rat snakes (Pantherophis) ===
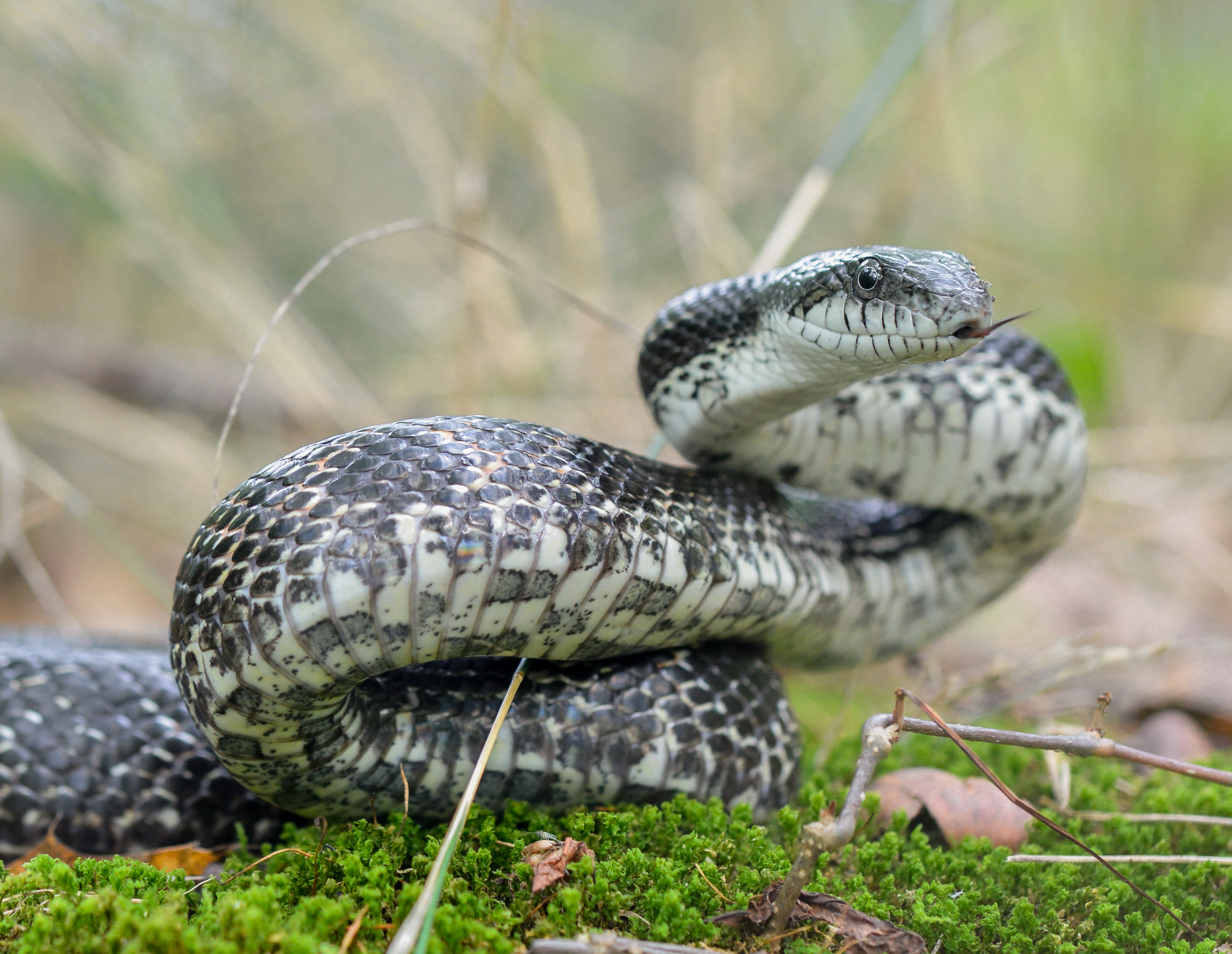
- Central rat snake (Pantherophis alleghaniensis)
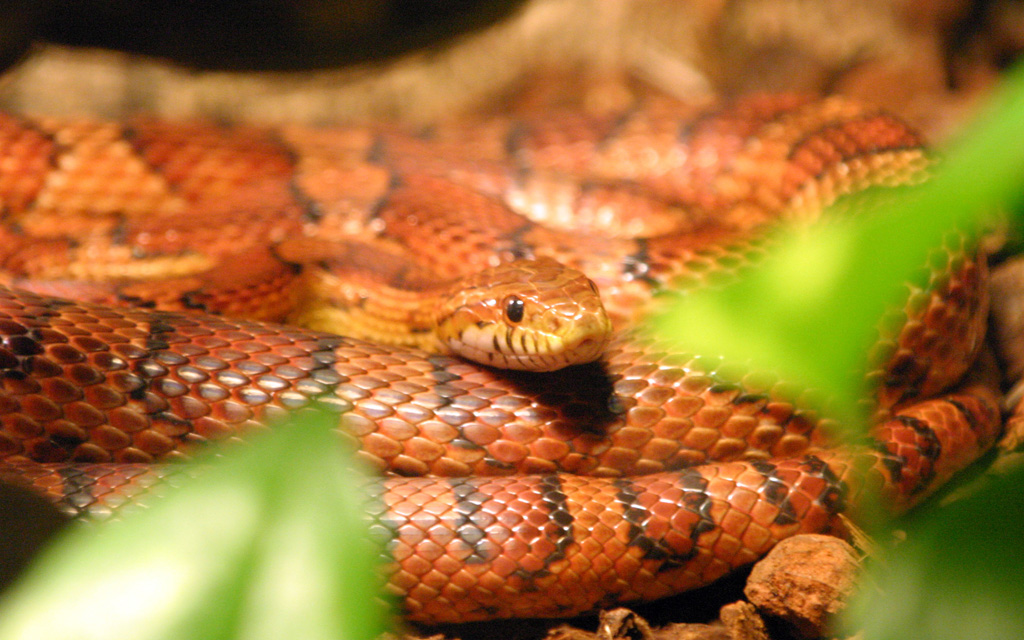
- Corn snake (Pantherophis guttatus)
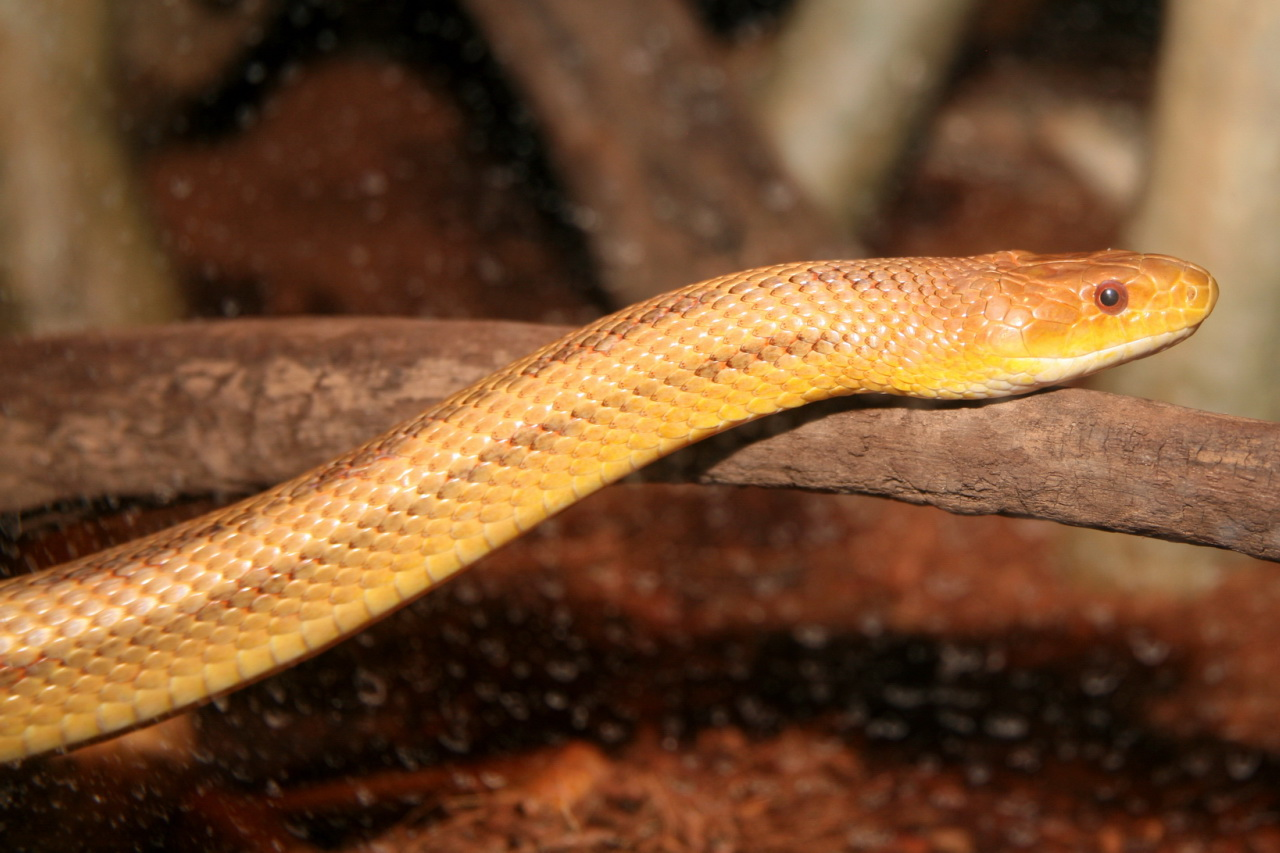
- Eastern rat snake (Yellow rat snake) (Pantherophis quadrivittatus)

=== Ring-necked snakes (Diadophis) ===
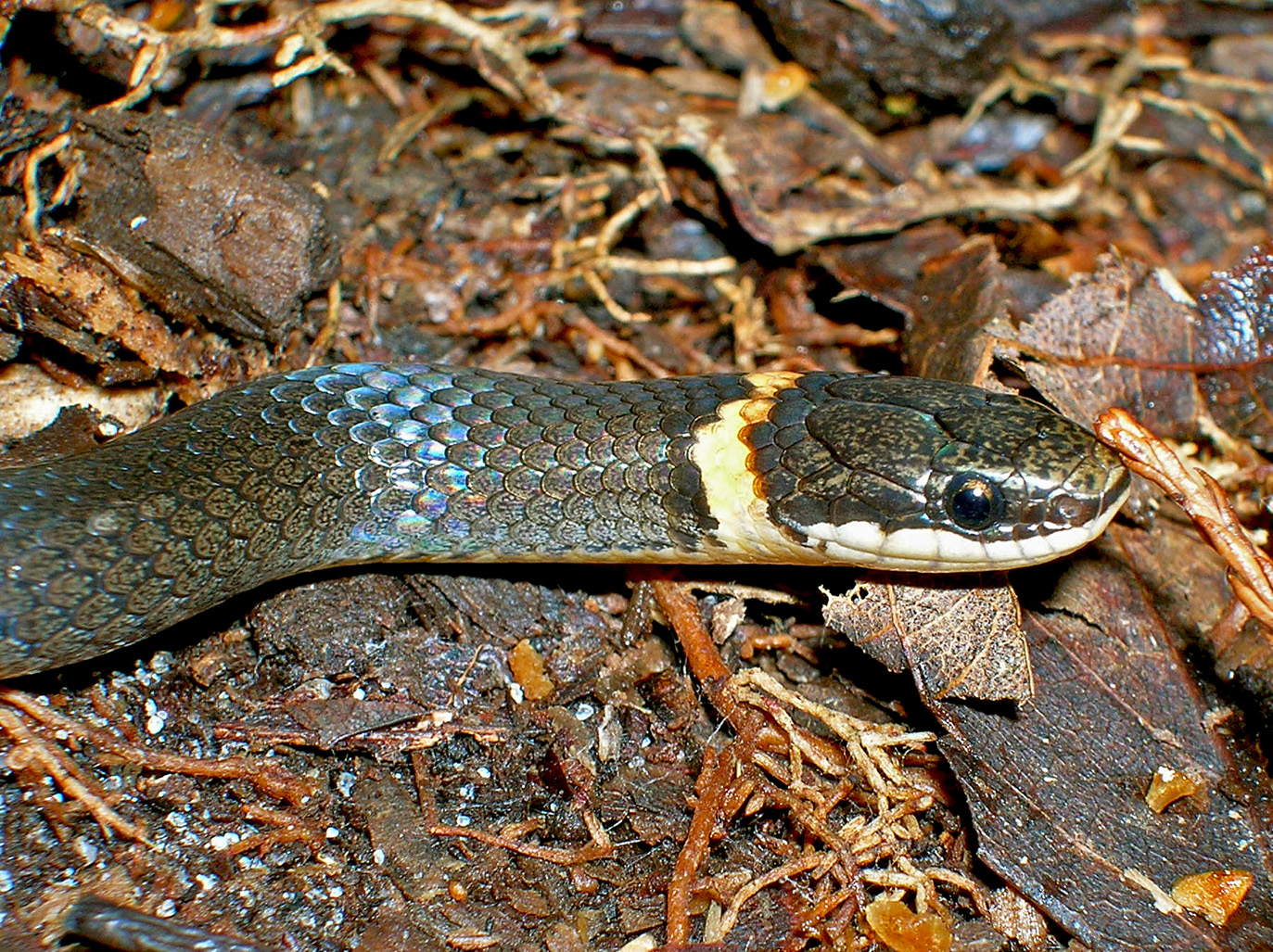
- Ring-necked snake (Diadophis punctatus)

=== Scarlet snakes (Cemophora) ===
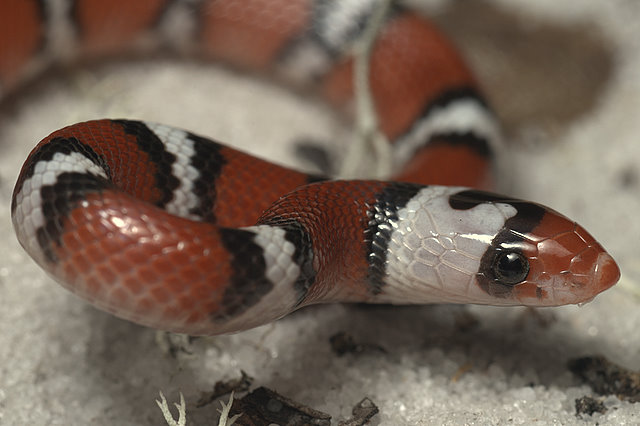
- Scarlet snake (Cemophora coccinea)

=== Water snakes (Nerodia) ===
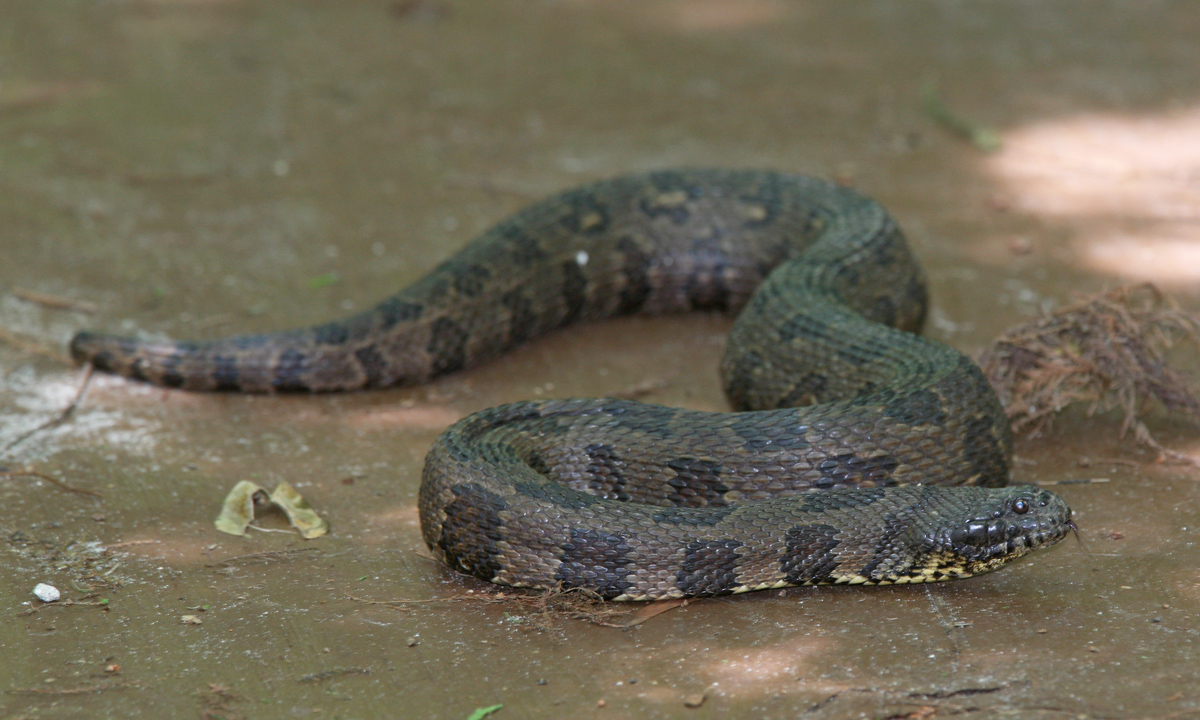
- Brown watersnake (Nerodia taxispilota)
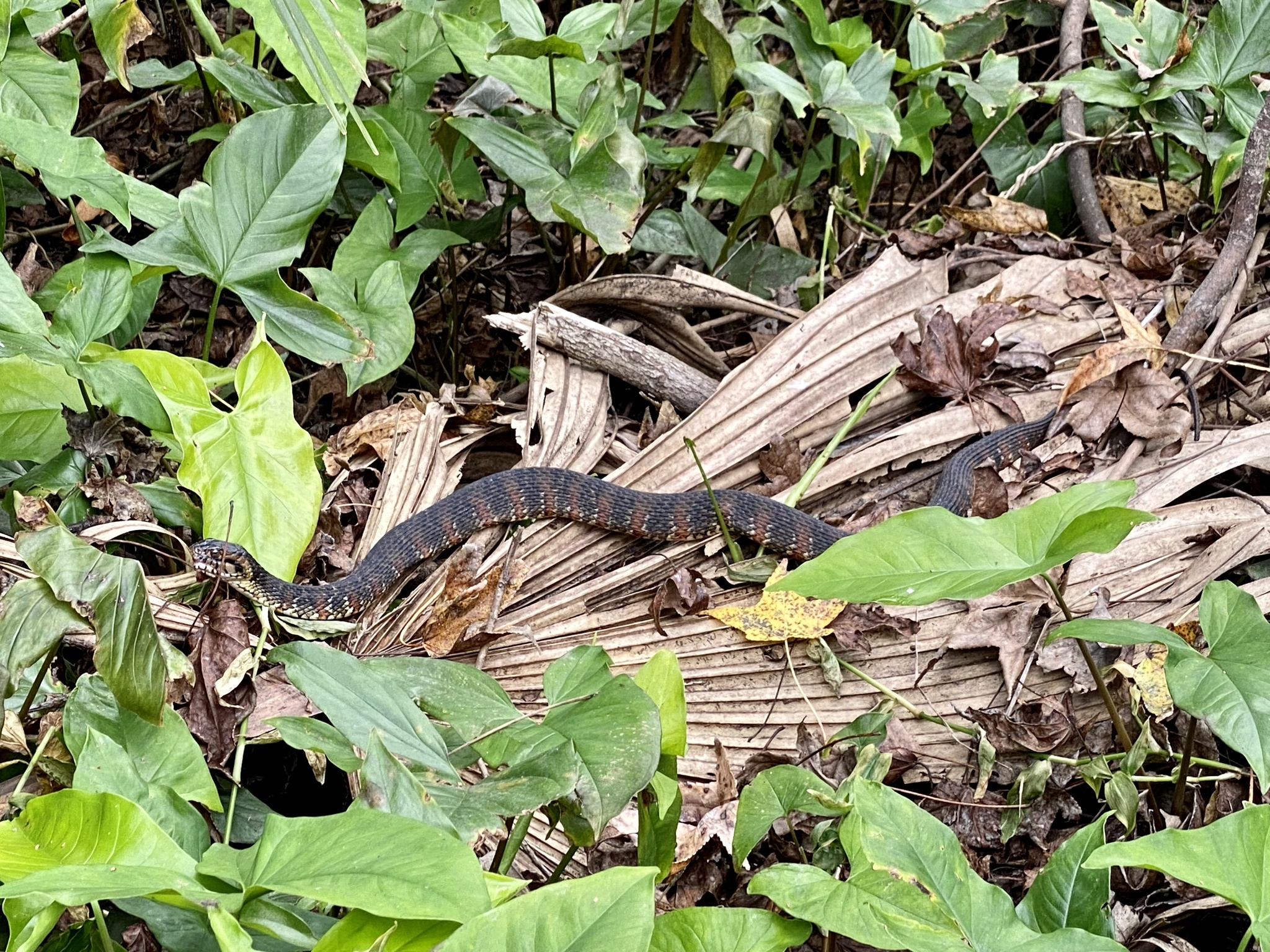
- Florida banded watersnake (Nerodia fasciata pictiventris)
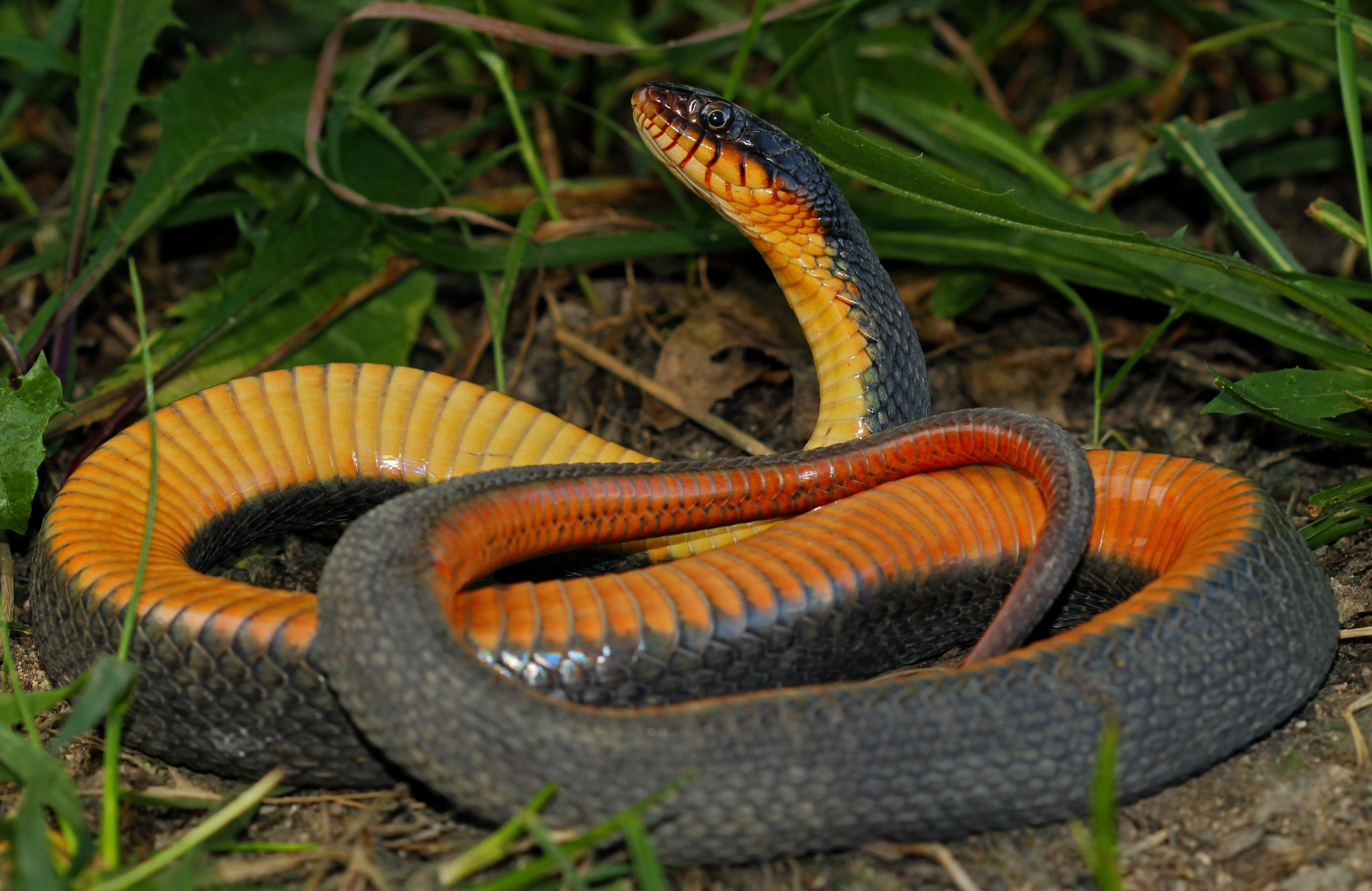
- Plain-bellied watersnake (Nerodia erythrogaster)
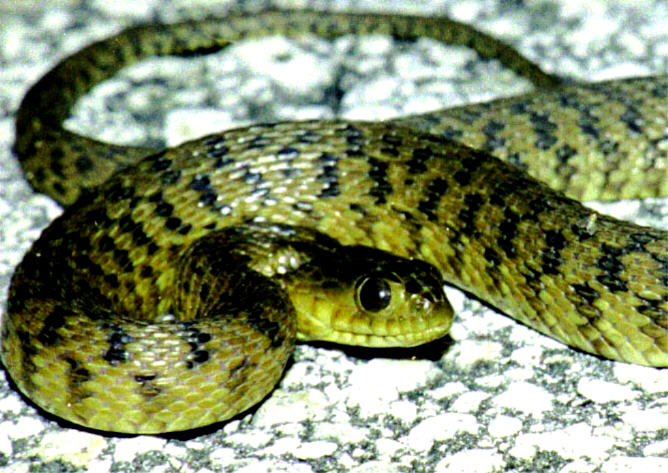
- Florida green watersnake (Nerodia floridana)
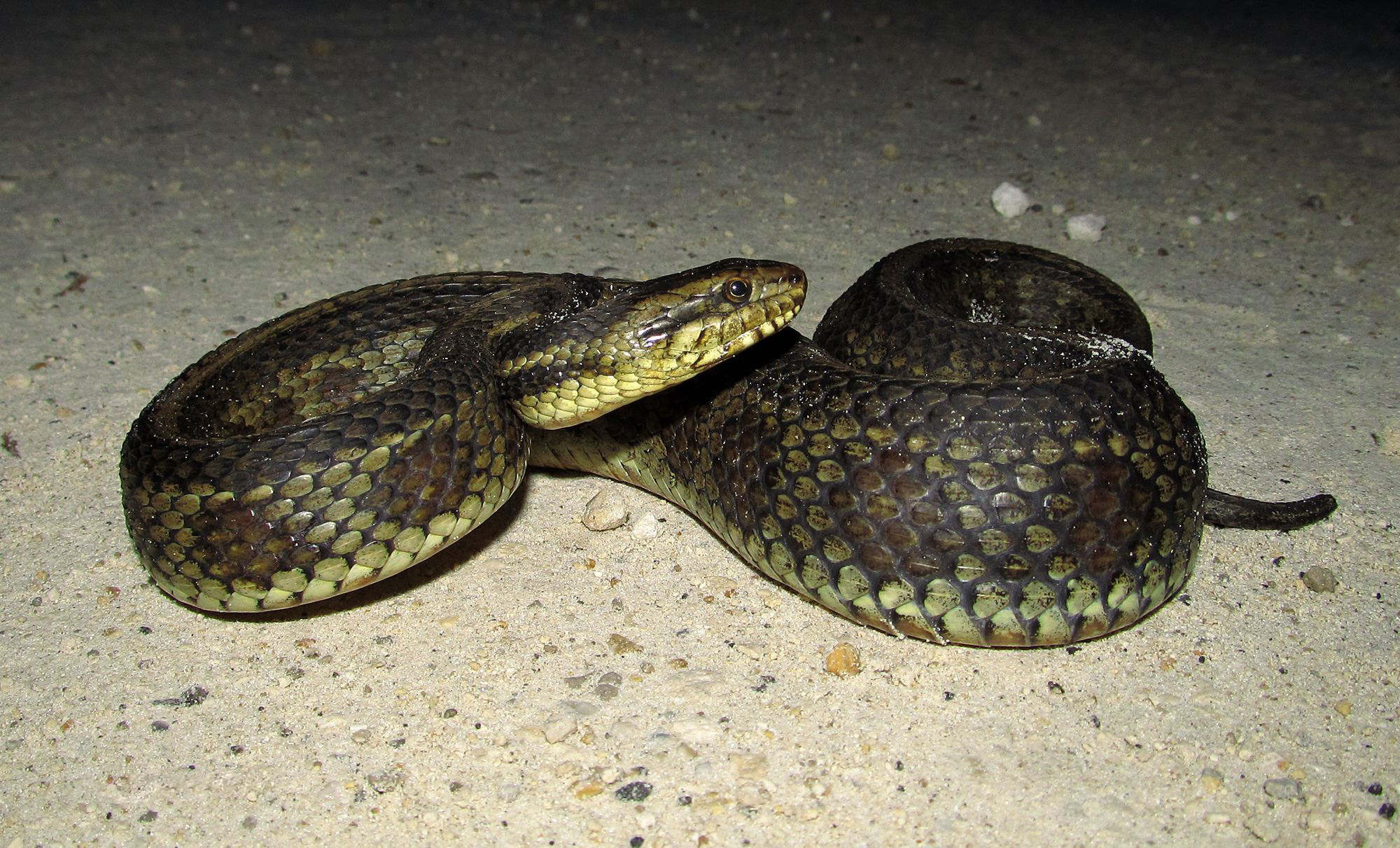
- Salt marsh snake (Nerodia clarkii)
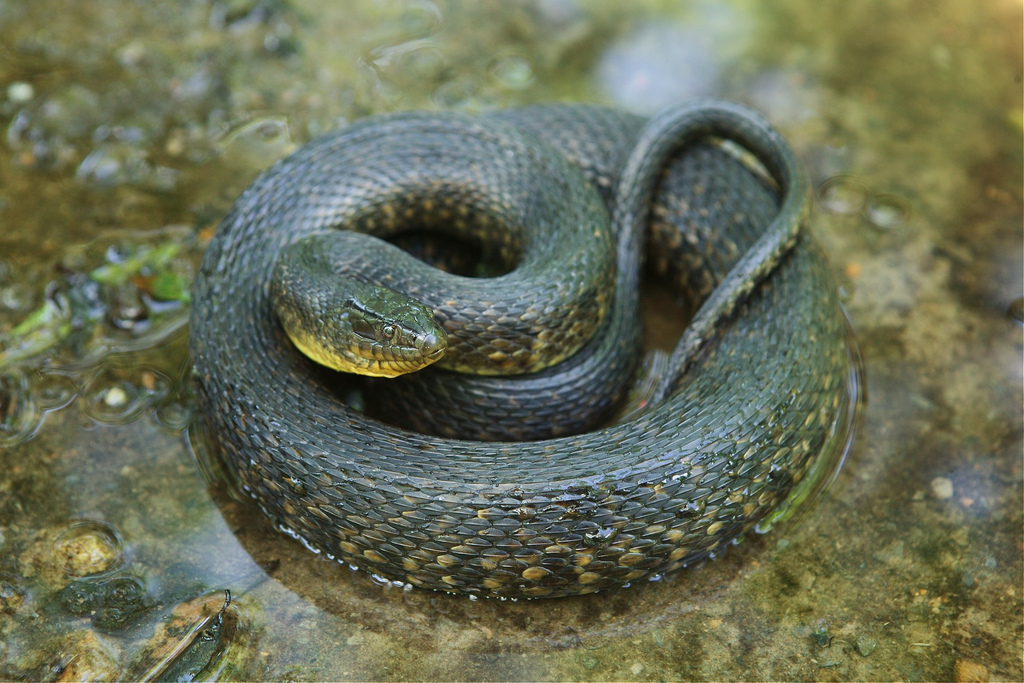
- Mississippi green watersnake (Nerodia cyclopion)
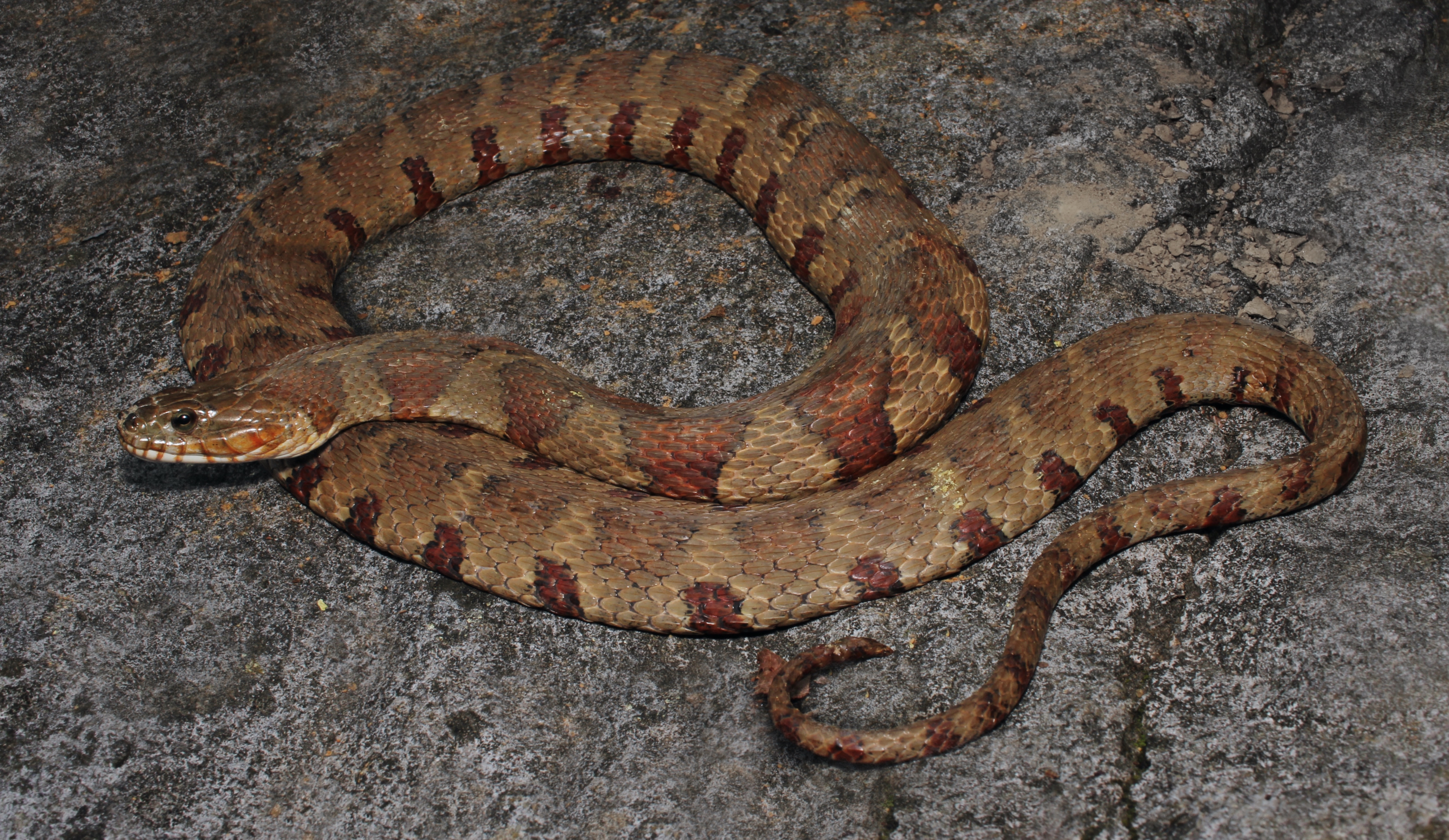
- Common watersnake (Nerodia sipedon)

== Venomous ==
=== Pit Vipers (Crotalinae) ===
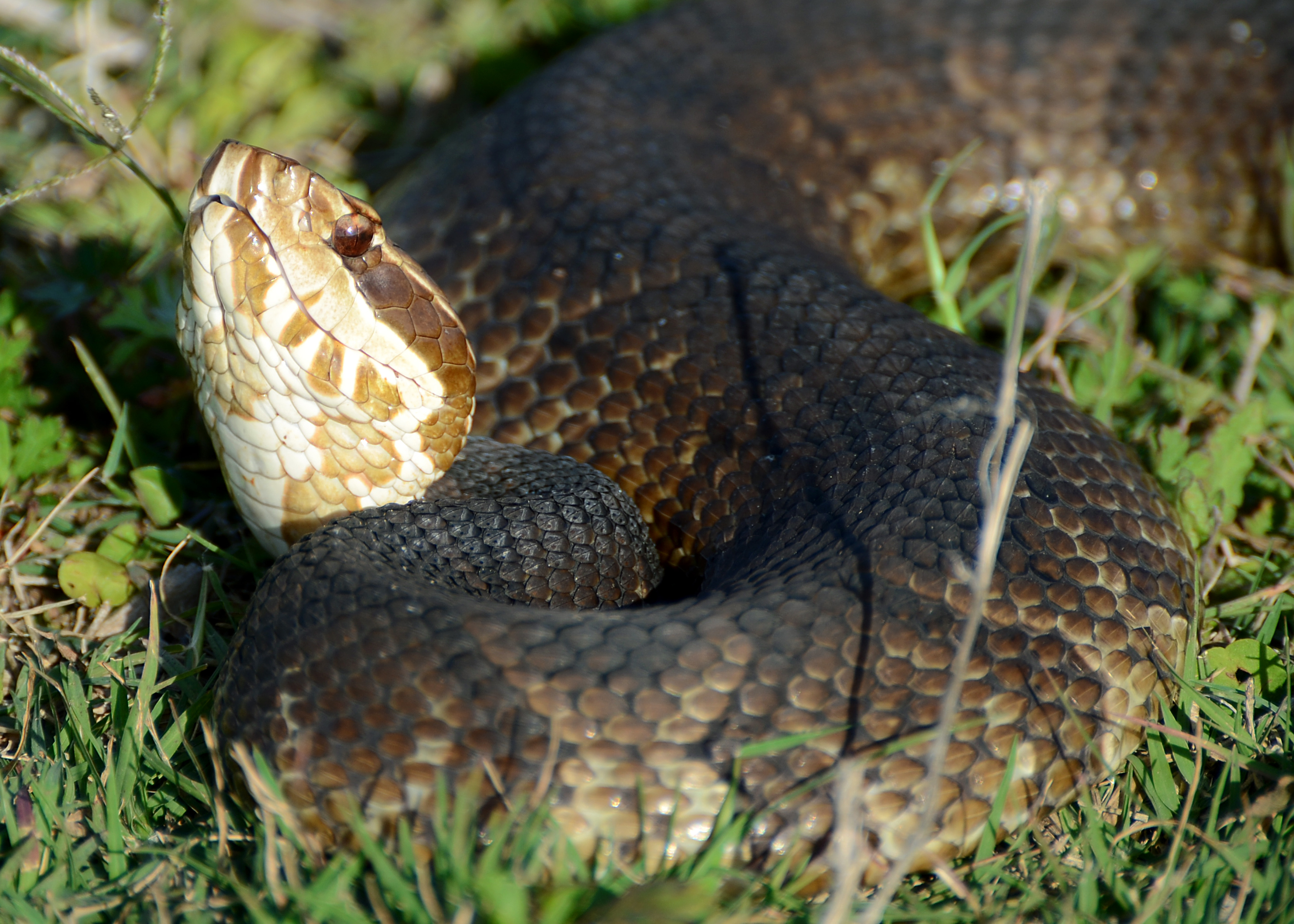
- Florida cottonmouth (Agkistrodon conanti)
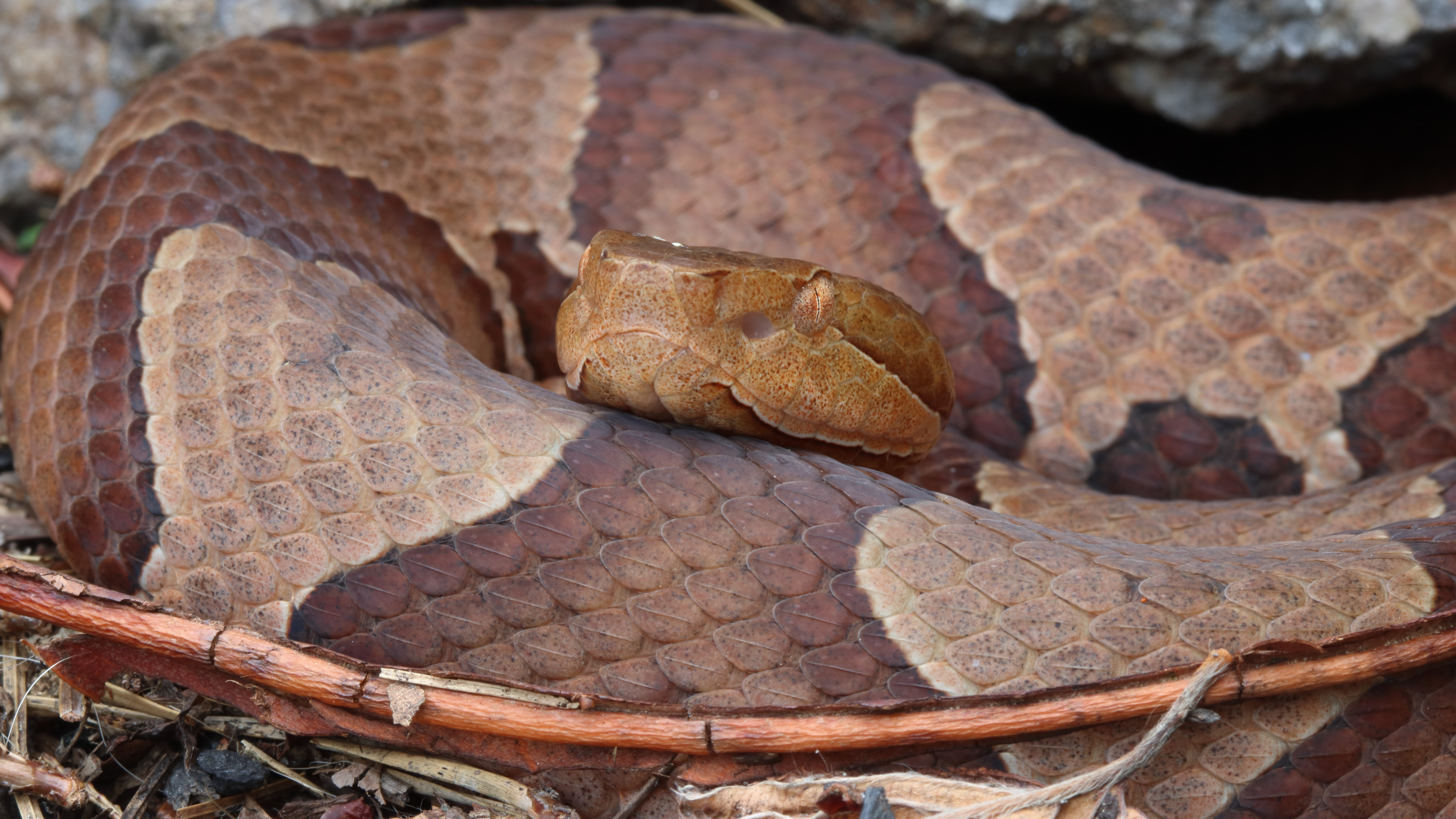
- Eastern copperhead (Agkistrodon contortrix)
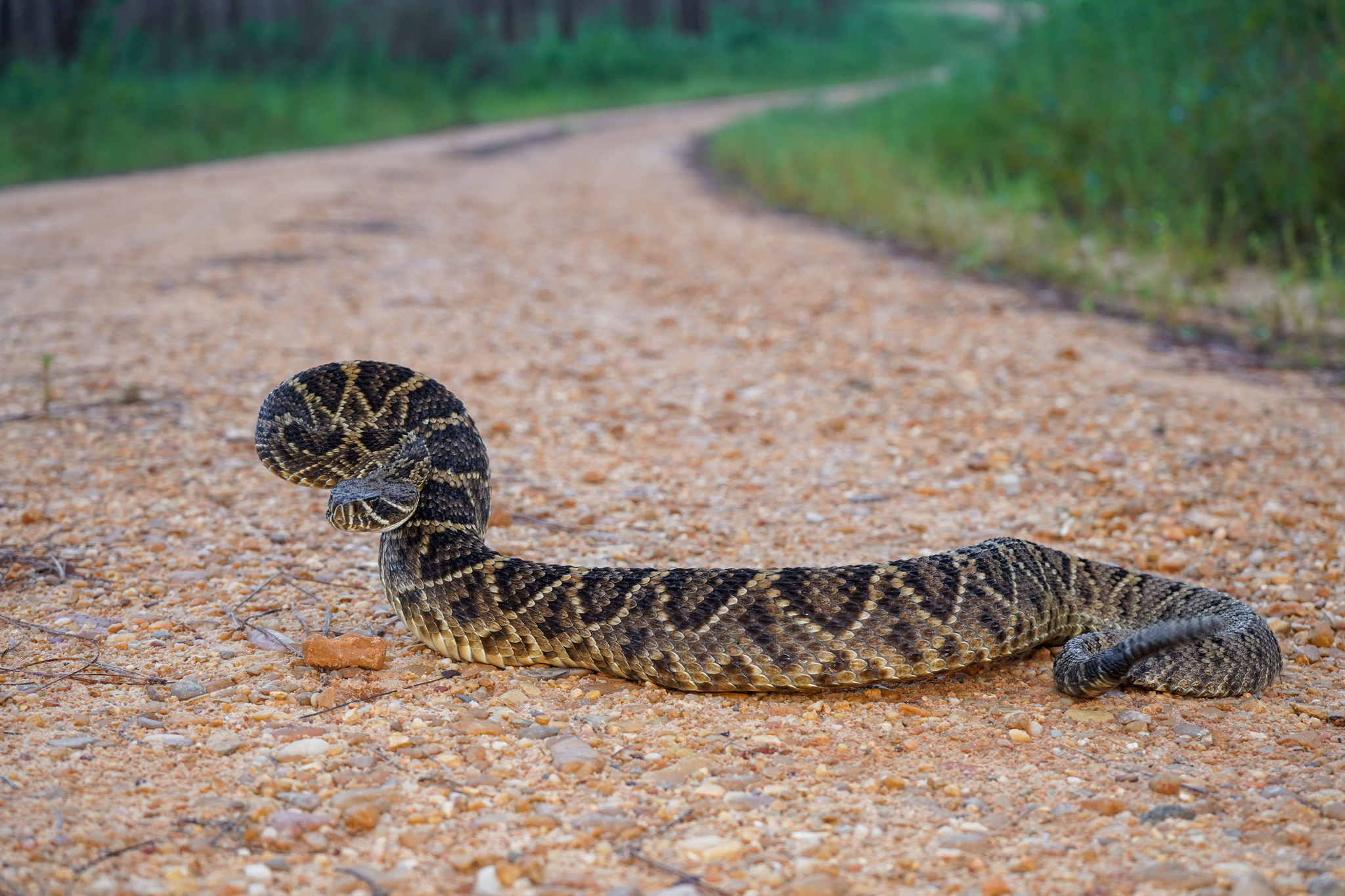
- Eastern diamondback rattlesnake (Crotalus adamanteus)
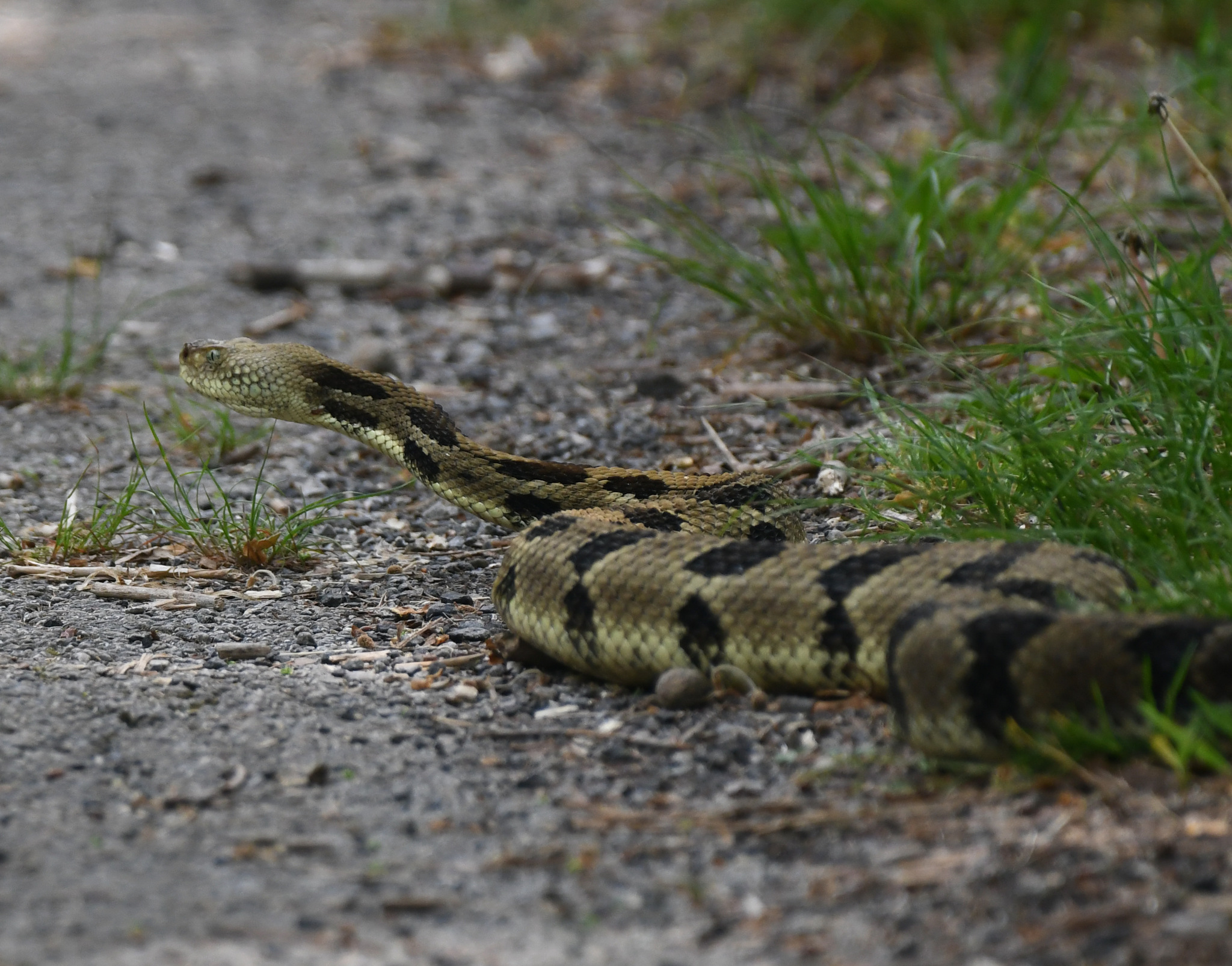
- Timber rattlesnake (Canebrake rattlesnake) (Crotalus horridus)
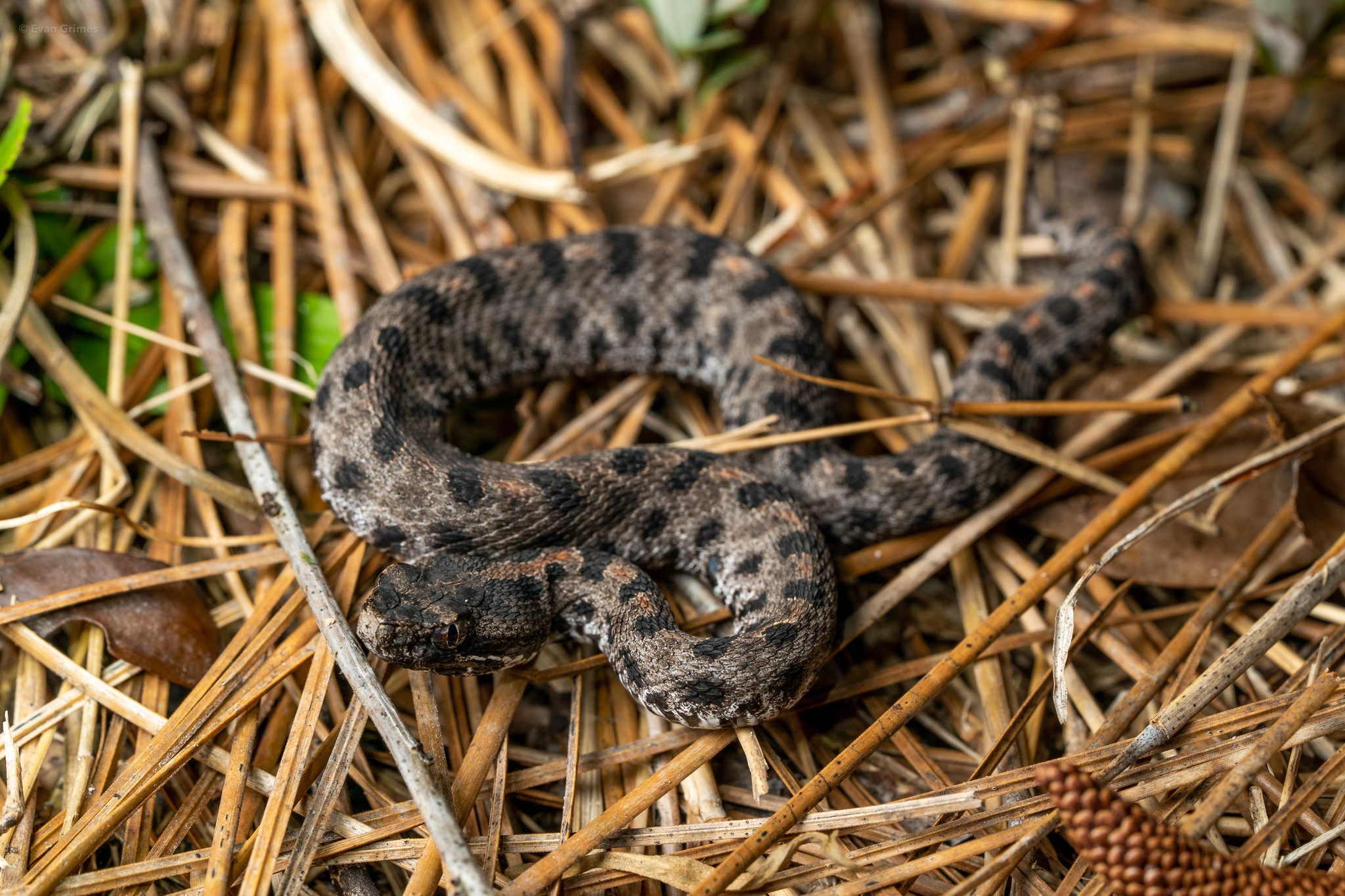
- Dusky pygmy rattlesnake (Sistrurus miliarius barbouri)

=== Elapids (Elapidae) ===
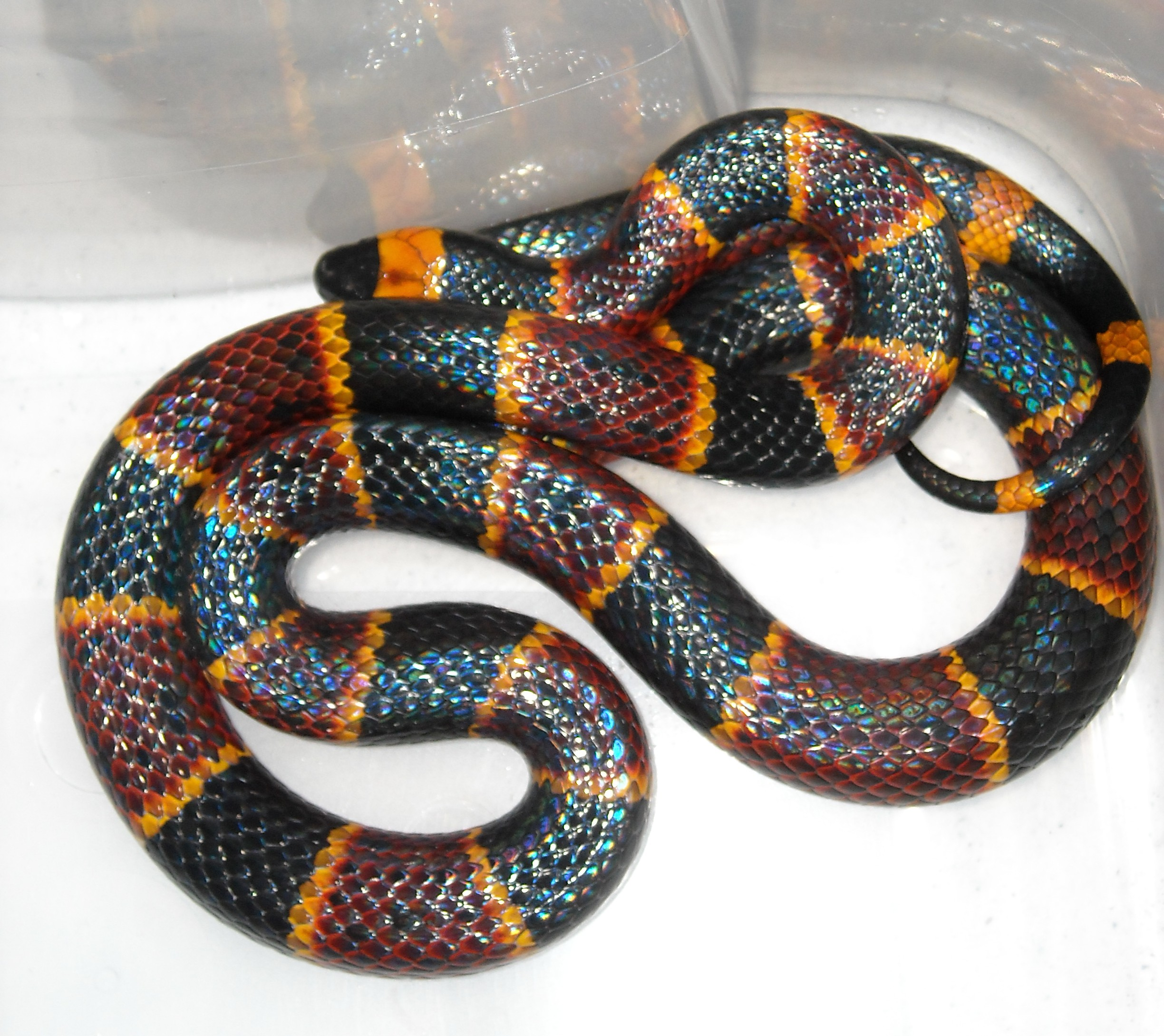
- Eastern coral snake (Micrurus fulvius)

== See also ==
- List of amphibians of Florida
- List of birds of Florida
- List of mammals of Florida
- List of reptiles of Florida
- List of fishes of Florida
- List of invasive species in Florida
- List of invasive species in the Everglades
- Fauna of Florida
