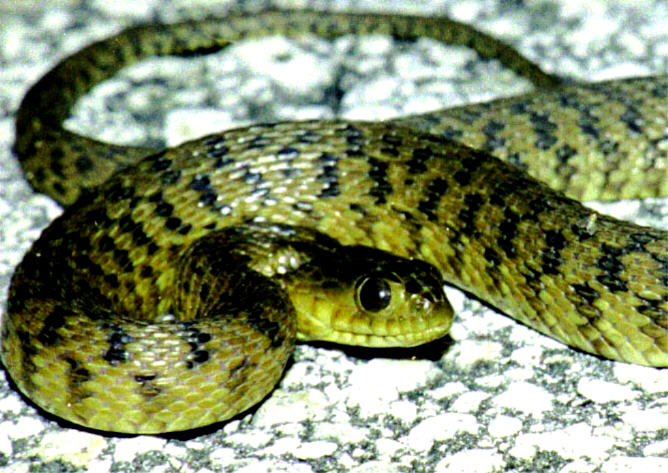
- Juvenile Florida green watersnake

Conservation status
- Least Concern (IUCN 3.1)

Scientific classification
- Kingdom: Animalia
- Phylum: Chordata
- Class: Reptilia
- Order: Squamata
- Suborder: Serpentes
- Family: Colubridae
- Genus: Nerodia
- Species: N. floridana

Binomial name
- Nerodia floridana (Goff, 1936)

Synonyms
- Natrix cyclopion floridana Goff, 1936; Nerodia cyclopion floridana — Mehrtens, 1987; Nerodia floridana — Conant & Collins, 1991

= Nerodia floridana =

Species of snake

Nerodia floridana, commonly known as the Florida green watersnake, or eastern green watersnake, is a harmless species of snake in the subfamily Natricinae of the family Colubridae. The species is native to the southeastern United States.

== Description ==
N. floridana is the largest watersnake in North America. Fully grown it will typically reach 76–140 cm (30–55 in) in total length (including tail), with the record-sized specimen having measured 188 cm (74 in) in total length. Its coloration is solid grey or greenish-brownish with a white or yellow belly in adults, which darkens in color under the tail. Encircling the lower half of the eye is a row of scales, which is separate from the upper lip scales. Among all southeastern U.S. snakes, only the green water snake has this feature. Juveniles have typically, about 50 dark crossbars on the dorsum and on the sides, which fade gradually with age.

== Geographic distribution and habitat ==
N. floridana is found in Alabama, Florida, Georgia, and South Carolina. In southern South Carolina it is commonly found in open, marshy wetland areas. It is rarely found in rivers or streams. It prefers choked vegetation and calm waters such as swamps and marshes. It is also generally found in lakes, ponds, ditches, and occasionally in brackish water.

== Behavior and ecology ==
In southern Florida, N. floridana is active year round. Like other water snakes of the southeastern U.S., N. floridana hibernates during the winter in the northern, coldest parts of its range. In colder areas and months, the snake can be seen basking outdoors on sunny days. In southern Florida, it often travels overland on rainy days.

=== Diet ===
Little is known about the diet of N. floridana. Most reports suggest that its diet consists primarily of fish, including sunfish, crappies, and small bass. It also preys upon frogs, especially pig frogs, tadpoles, and salamanders. Little is known about its methods for finding prey, but like other water snakes, N. floridana swallows its prey alive.

=== Reproduction ===
N. floridana bears live young by ovoviviparity similar to other North American water snakes. A few observations have been made of matings in late winter or early spring. Females generally have very large litters and give birth in the summer. The size of the litter ranges from 20 to 40, and the young are typically born from June to September. The record litter for the species was 132 babies, taken from a dead female.

== Threats ==
Despite the huge litters of N. floridana, most juveniles never reach adulthood. Common predators in its wetland habitat include river otters, hawks, herons, egrets, ospreys, turtles, kingsnakes, alligators, and several species of predatory fish. When threatened, the Florida green watersnake's first impulse is to escape, and if captured, it will then resort to biting or releasing a strong musk from its scent glands.

== Conservation status ==
The species N. floridana is abundant in many wetland areas, except for the northern areas of its range. Thousands of N. floridana die annually on Florida roads and highways near wetland habitats. In Georgia and South Carolina N. floridana is considered "state imperiled".
