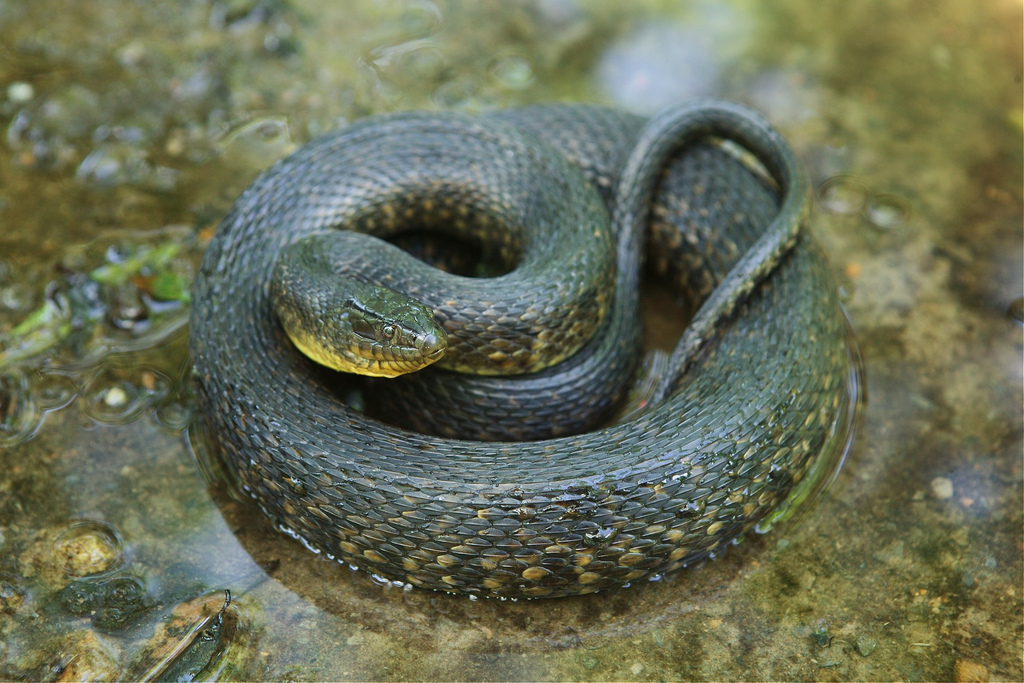
- Nerodia cyclopion in Arkansas

Conservation status
- Least Concern (IUCN 3.1)

Scientific classification
- Kingdom: Animalia
- Phylum: Chordata
- Class: Reptilia
- Order: Squamata
- Suborder: Serpentes
- Family: Colubridae
- Genus: Nerodia
- Species: N. cyclopion

Binomial name
- Nerodia cyclopion (A.M.C. Duméril, Bibron & A.H.A. Duméril, 1854)
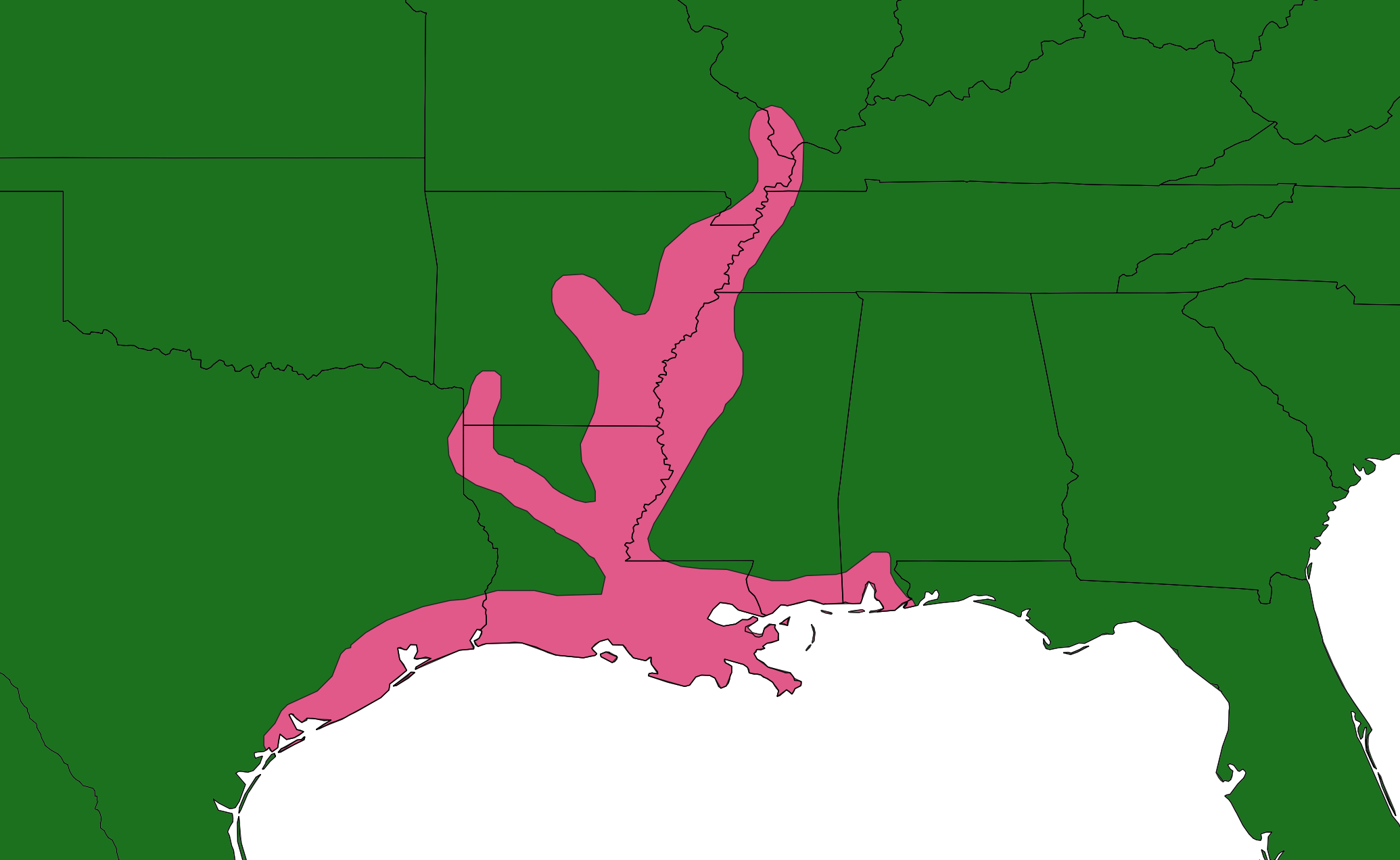

Synonyms
- Tropidonotus cyclopion A.M.C. Duméril, Bibron & A.H.A. Duméril, 1854; Natrix cyclopium — Cope, 1892; Nerodia cyclopium — Garman, 1892; Natrix cyclopion — Schmidt & Davis, 1941; Nerodia cyclopion — H.M. Smith & Brodie, 1982

= Green water snake =

Species of snake

The green water snake (Nerodia cyclopion) is a common species of nonvenomous natricine snake endemic to the southeastern United States.

== Geographic range ==
N. cyclopion is distributed from the Florida panhandle westward to Louisiana, and northward through the Mississippi Valley into southern Illinois.

More precisely, it is found in southwestern Alabama, southeastern Arkansas, northwestern Florida, southern Illinois, southwestern Indiana, western Kentucky, Louisiana, southern Mississippi, southeastern Missouri, western Tennessee, and southeastern Texas.

The type locality is New Orleans, Louisiana.

== Description ==
N. cyclopion differs from most other species of North American water snakes by having one or more small scales under the eye, giving the appearance of a ring of small plates around the eye, a character shared with the species N. floridana.

A heavy-bodied snake, N. cyclopion is dark green, olive, or brown dorsally. Ventrally, it is yellowish on the anterior third, and the on remainder dark brown with yellow or white semicircles.

N. cyclopion averages 76–140 cm (30-55 inches) in total length (including tail).

== Nomenclature and subspecies ==
N. cyclopion is commonly known as both the green water snake and the Mississippi green water snake, or the Mississippi green watersnake.

The former subspecies, Nerodia cyclopion floridana (Goff, 1936), also known commonly as the Florida green water snake, has been elevated to a full species known as Nerodia floridana.

== Habitat ==
N. cyclopion prefers still waters such as bayous, lakes, marshes, ponds, sluggish streams, and swamps. It is sometimes found in brackish water.

== Diet ==
N. cyclopion preys most commonly on fish, though it also feeds on crayfish, frogs, and salamanders. It typically forages during early evening, though hot weather causes it to forage at night.

== Reproduction ==
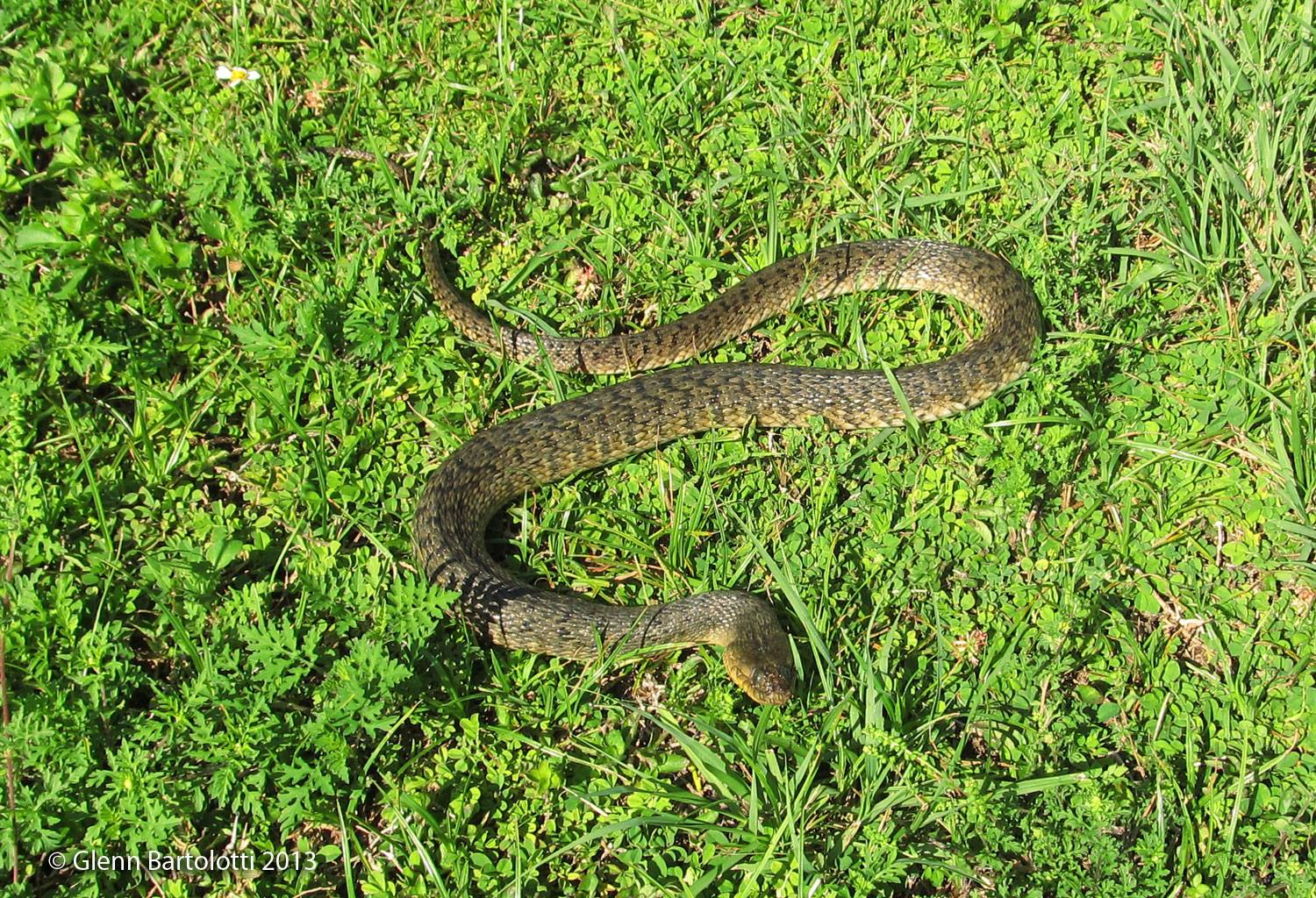
Green water snake, Florida

The green water snake is ovoviviparous. Mating takes place on land in April. The young are born in July or August, and are about 25 cm (10 in) long. Brood size varies from 7 to 101, depending on the size of the female. The females, which are larger than the males and have two more dorsal scale rows, may weigh over 4.1 kg (9 lb).
