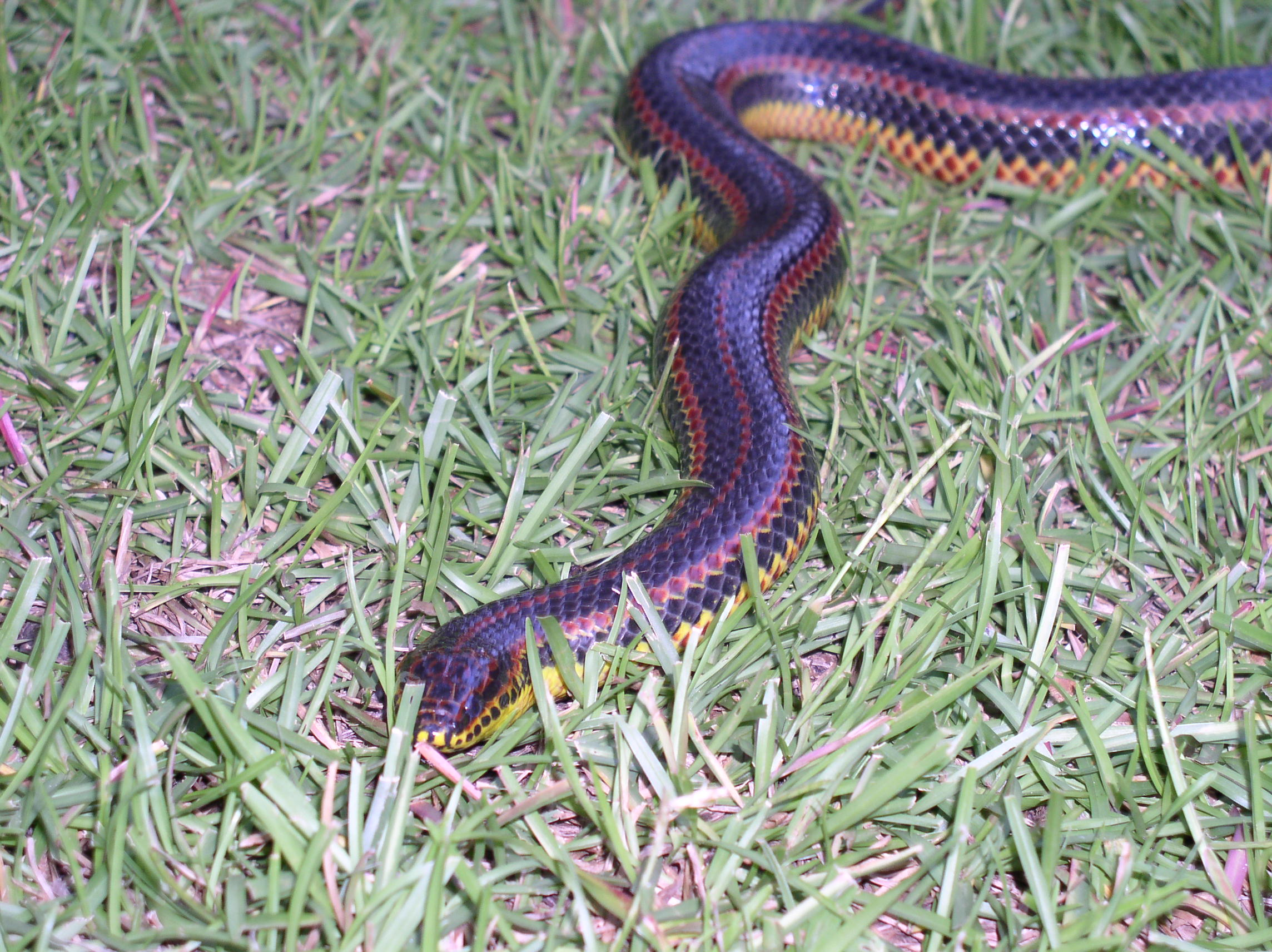
- Farancia erytrogramma

Scientific classification
- Domain: Eukaryota
- Kingdom: Animalia
- Phylum: Chordata
- Class: Reptilia
- Order: Squamata
- Suborder: Serpentes
- Family: Colubridae
- Subfamily: Dipsadinae
- Genus: Farancia; Gray, 1842

= Farancia =

Genus of snakes

Farancia is a genus of colubrid snakes. It consists of two species, one commonly referred to as the rainbow snake (F. erytrogramma) and the other commonly referred to as the mud snake (F. abacura). Both species are native to the southeastern United States.

== Description ==
Adult specimens of Farancia species are usually to 36-54 inches (92–137 cm) in total length (including tail). They are usually dark brown or black dorsally, with a brightly colored underside that is red or orange. Rainbow snakes exhibit red striping down their backs.

The body of Farancia species is cylindrical, robust, and muscular. The smooth, shiny, and iridescent dorsal scales are arranged in 19 rows at midbody. The tail is short, ending in a spine.

== Behaviour ==
Snakes of the genus Farancia are amphibious and semiaquatic, living along the muddy edges and rocks of slow-moving and/or permanent water sources.

== Diet ==
The diet of Farancia species consists primarily of amphiumas, eels, and sirens.

== Reproduction ==
In Farancia breeding occurs in early spring, and eggs are laid in a burrow near the water in early summer. The clutch incubates between 8–12 weeks, and hatches in mid-autumn.

== Species and subspecies ==
- Farancia abacura – Alabama, Arkansas, Florida, Georgia, Illinois, Kentucky, Louisiana, Mississippi, Missouri, North Carolina, South Carolina, Tennessee, Texas, and Virginia.
  - Farancia abacura abacura (Holbrook, 1836) – eastern mud snake
  - Farancia abacura reinwardtii (Schlegel, 1837) – western mud snake
- Farancia erytrogramma – Alabama, Florida, Georgia, Louisiana, Maryland, Mississippi, North Carolina, South Carolina, and Virginia.
  - Farancia erytrogramma erytrogramma (Palisot de Beauvois, 1802) – rainbow snake
  - †Farancia erytrogramma seminola (Neill, 1964) – Florida rainbow snake
