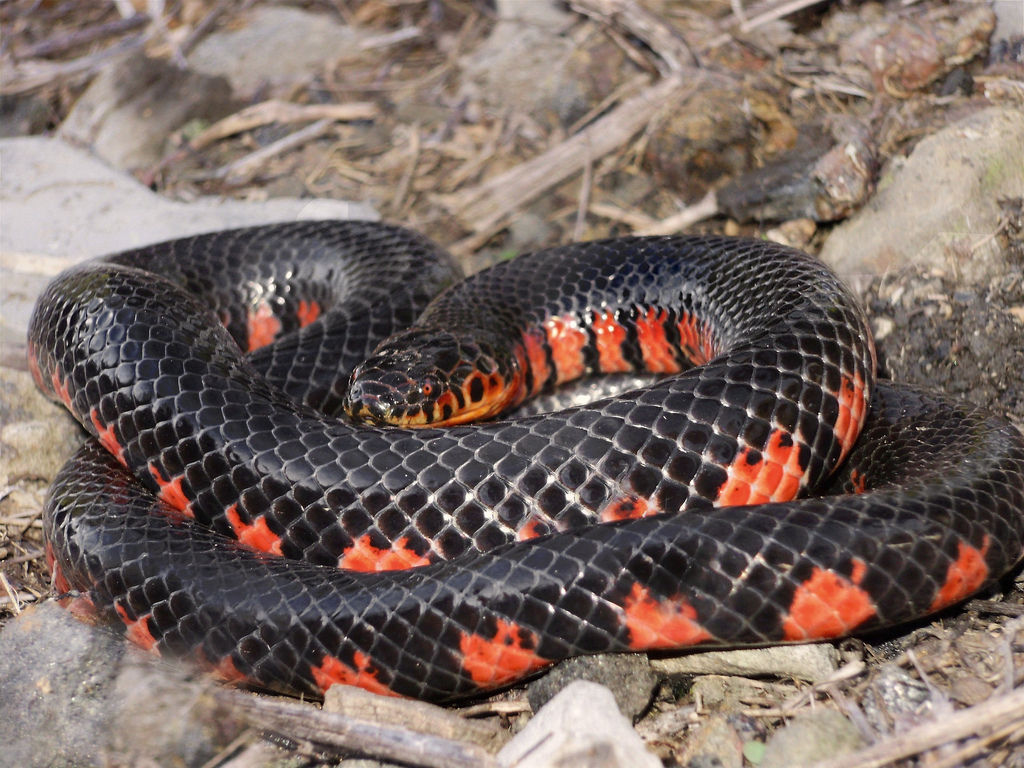
- Western mud snake (F. a. reinwardtii), in Illinois
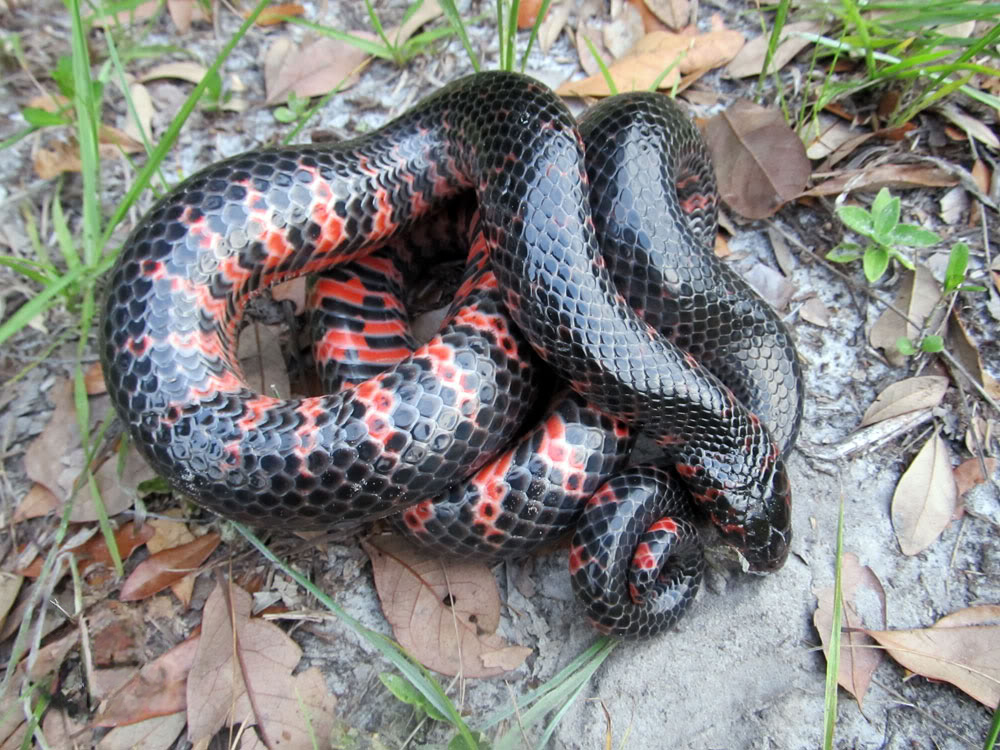
- Eastern mud snake (F. a. abacura), Pasco County, Florida

Conservation status
- Least Concern (IUCN 3.1)

Scientific classification
- Kingdom: Animalia
- Phylum: Chordata
- Class: Reptilia
- Order: Squamata
- Suborder: Serpentes
- Family: Colubridae
- Genus: Farancia
- Species: F. abacura

Binomial name
- Farancia abacura (Holbrook, 1836)
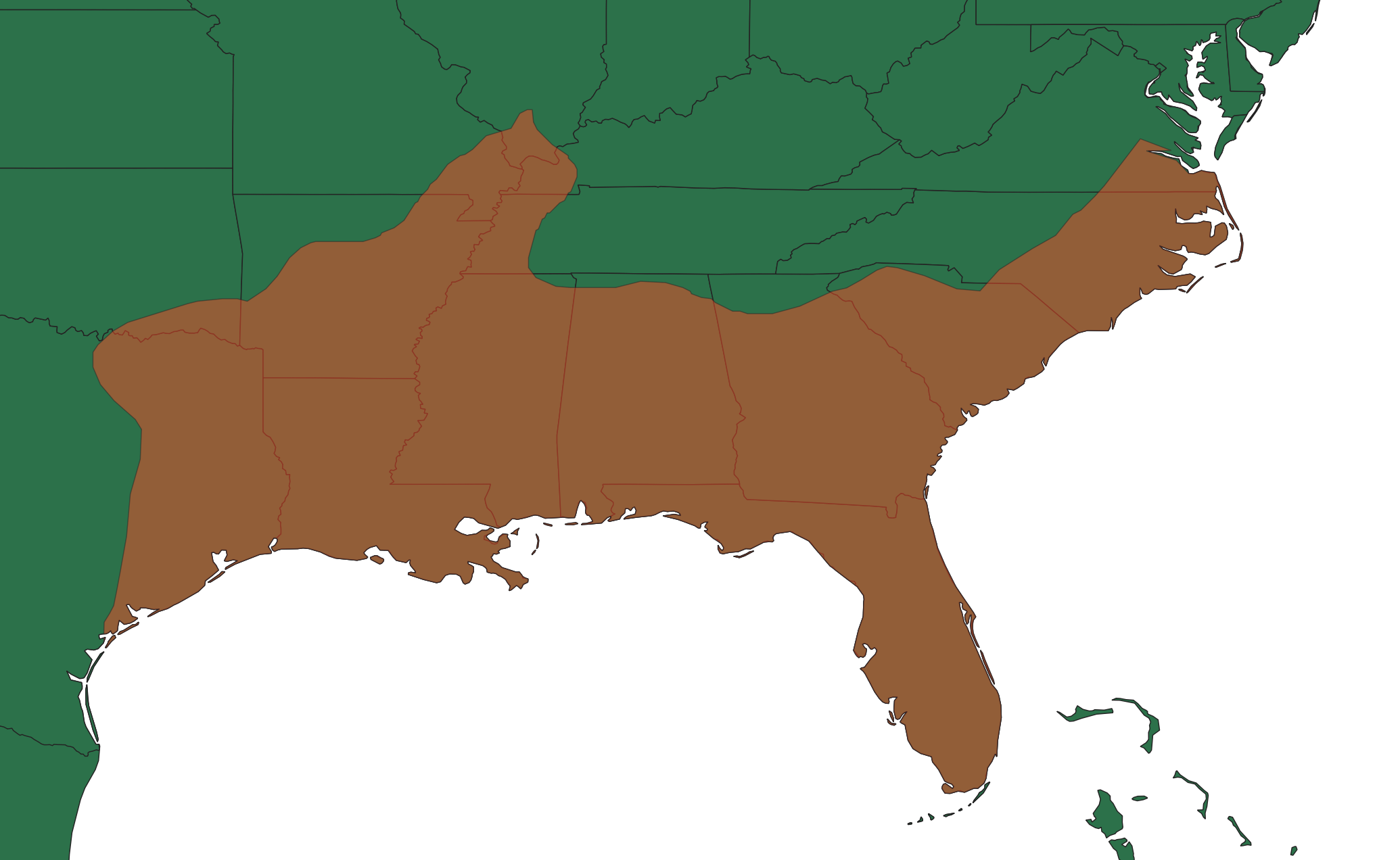

Synonyms
- List: Coluber abacurus Holbrook, 1836; Homalopsis reinwardtii Schlegel, 1837; Helicops abacurus — Holbrook, 1840; Farancia abacurus — Baird & Girard, 1853; Calopisma abacurum — A.M.C. Duméril, Bibron & A.H.A. Duméril, 1854; Homolopsis crassa Blyth, 1854; Hydrops abacurus — Garman, 1883; Farancia abacura — Boulenger, 1894

= Mud snake =

Species of snake

The mud snake (Farancia abacura) is a species of nonvenomous, semiaquatic, colubrid snake endemic to the southeastern United States.

== Description ==
The mud snake usually grows to a total length (including tail) of 40 to 54 inches (1-1.4 m), with the record total length being slightly over 80 inches (2 m).

This species is sexually dimorphic in size. Female adults are larger than males in total length.

The upperside of the mud snake is glossy black. The underside is red and black, and the red extends up the sides to form bars of reddish-pink, although some have a completely black body with slightly lighter black spots instead of the common reddish colors.

The heavy body is cylindrical in cross section, and the short tail has a terminal spine.

The head scalation is distinctive in that there is only one internasal scale, no preocular scale, and one anterior temporal scale. The dorsal scales are smooth, and are arranged in 19 rows at midbody. There are 168–208 ventral scales and 31–55 subcaudal scales. The anal plate is divided.

Farancia abacura is closely related to Farancia erytrogramma, also called the rainbow snake.

== Subspecies ==
There are two recognized subspecies of Farancia abacura, including the nominotypical subspecies:

- Farancia abacura abacura (Holbrook, 1836) – eastern mud snake
- Farancia abacura reinwardtii (Schlegel, 1837) – western mud snake

== Geographic range ==
The mud snake is found in the southeastern United States, in the states of Alabama, Arkansas, Florida, Georgia, Illinois, Kentucky, Louisiana, Mississippi, Missouri, North Carolina, Oklahoma, South Carolina, Tennessee, Texas, and Virginia.

== Habitat ==
F. abacura inhabits the edges of streams and cypress swamps, among dense vegetation or under ground debris, using wet conditions to burrow itself into the mud. It is almost fully aquatic and rarely leaves the water, except to lay eggs, hibernate, or during drought to escape drying wetlands. After heavy rain fall, its home range may increase to take advantage of new food sources. It occupies aquatic habitats with freshwater or brackish waters. For hibernation, they commonly use cavities in soil or old tree stumps.

== Behavior ==
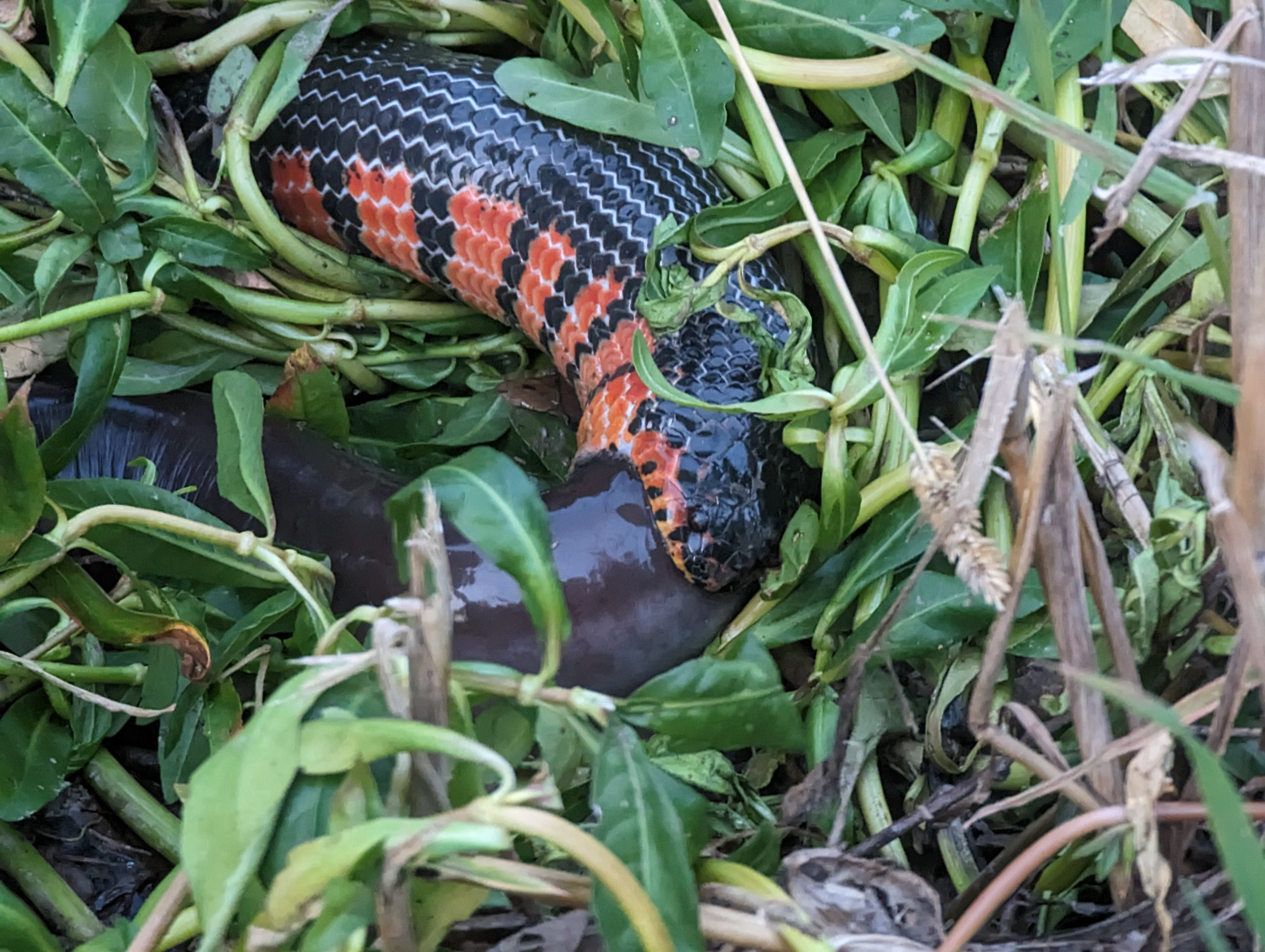
Western mud snake feeding on a two-toed amphiuma.

The mud snake is mostly aquatic and nocturnal. It preys mostly on giant aquatic salamanders in the genera Siren and Amphiuma, but it also eats other amphibians.

They are known to use their sharply pointed tails to prod prey items, leading to the nickname "stinging snake", although their tail is not a stinger and cannot sting. Enlarged teeth occur at the rear of the upper jaw, which presumably help to hold slippery prey. Upon being disturbed, mud snakes will sometimes tuck their head beneath their coils and expose the red underside on the tail as a warning display.

== Reproduction ==
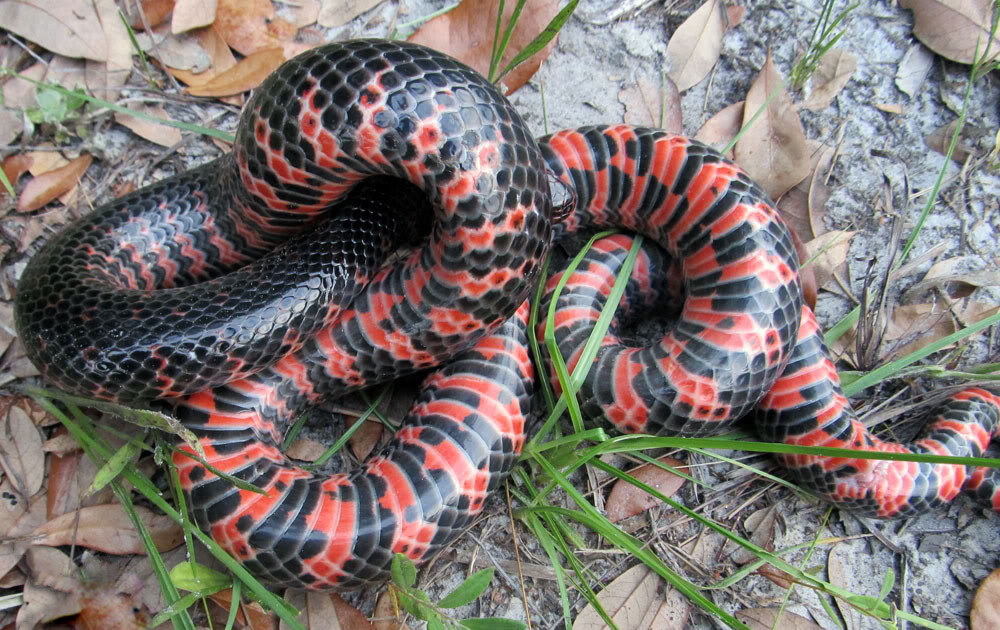
Venter

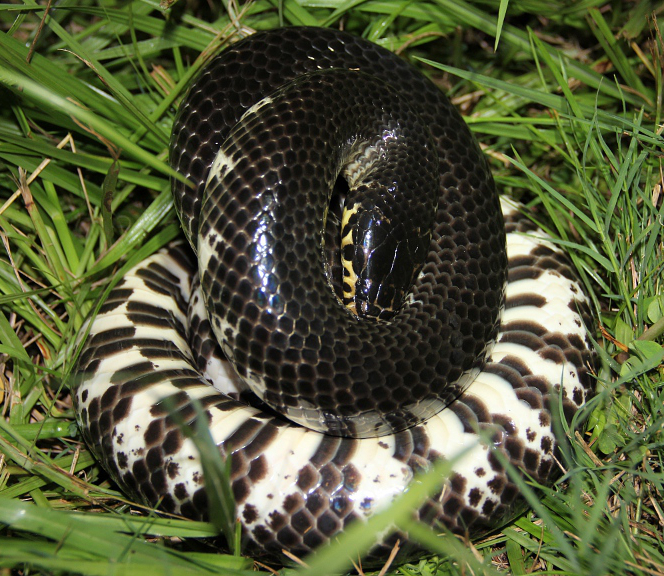
Anerythristic eastern mud snake, Florida

Breeding of F. abacura takes place in the spring, mostly in the months of April and May. During copulation, the female will wind itself around the male. They can stay in this position for over a day. Eight weeks after mating, the female lays 4 to 111 eggs in a nest dug out of moist soil, sometimes in alligator nests. The nests of this species can commonly be found in the ground under debris, but it is not limited to those areas. These nests are cavities in sandy soil with the eggs laid within. Some eggs can even be embedded into the wall. There is a positive correlation between body length and clutch size, with larger females having larger clutch sizes. She will remain with her eggs until they hatch, in the fall, usually September or October. Although unhatched eggs have not been found in the winter or spring, many juvenile mudsnakes are captured entering wetlands in the spring, most likely from clutches deposited and hatched in the preceding late summer or autumn. It is thought that mudsnake hatchlings either enter aquatic habitats in the autumn or delay entering them until the spring, but it is not known if they remain in a terrestrial nest or disperse into terrestrial habitats during this time.

== Cultural significance ==
The mud snake is one of a few animals which may be the origin of the hoop snake myth. J.D. Willson writes:

Mud snakes are sometimes known as "hoop snakes" because of the myth that they will bite their own tail and roll after people.

The hoop snake myth has also been attributed to the coachwhip snake.
