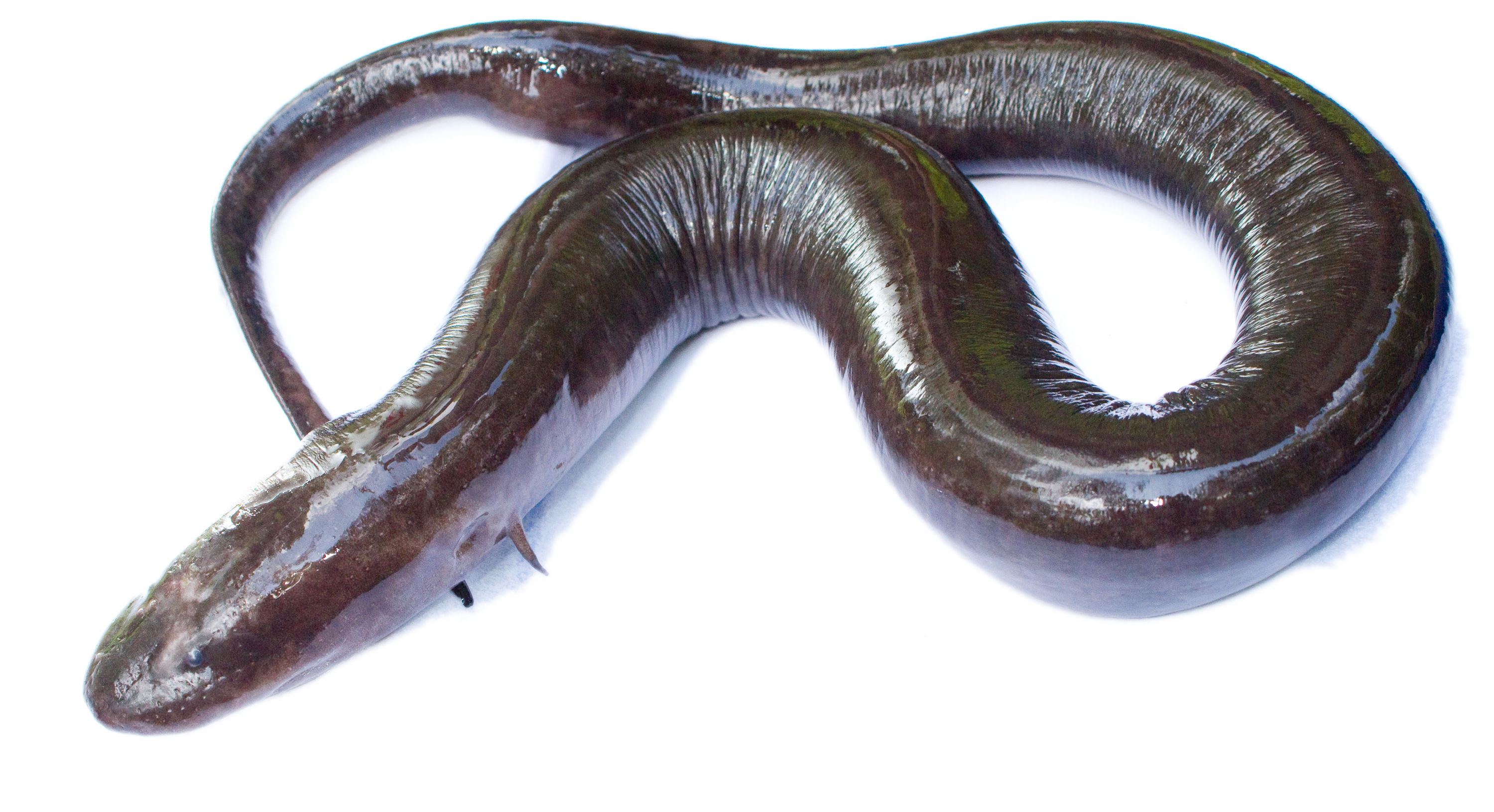

Conservation status
- Least Concern (IUCN 3.1)

- Secure (NatureServe)

Scientific classification
- Kingdom: Animalia
- Phylum: Chordata
- Class: Amphibia
- Order: Urodela
- Family: Amphiumidae
- Genus: Amphiuma
- Species: A. means

Binomial name
- Amphiuma means Garden in Smith, 1821

= Two-toed amphiuma =

Two-toed amphiuma Temporal range: Pleistocene - present

Species of amphibian

The two-toed amphiuma (Amphiuma means) is an aquatic salamander widely distributed in the southeastern United States. It is commonly, but incorrectly, called "congo snake", "conger eel" or the "blind eel".

== Description ==
Two-toed amphiumas are the most prominent in the Amphiumidae family and the longest salamander species in the United States, that can grow from 39 to 1,042 g (1.4 to 36.8 oz) in mass and from 34.8 to 116 cm (13.7 to 45.7 in) in length. They have four vestigial legs that end in two toes; the number of toes is one of the primary differences between Amphiuma means and its relatives, the one-toed and three-toed amphiumas. Additional genetic studies have been conducted on the three species; genetic distance estimates suggest that there is high levels of similarity between two-toed amphiumas and three-toed amphiumas, and much greater dissimilarity between the one-toed amphiuma and the two-toed amphiuma. The head is pointed and wedge-shaped, and the eyes are small. Adults retain a single gill slit on each side of the head. They are black, dark grey or dark brown in color. Two-toed amphiumas tend to be unicolored. Their dark dorsum contrasts with their slightly lighter ventrum.

== Distribution and habitat ==
Amphiumas live in areas of shallow, heavily vegetated water in swamps, bayous, lakes, and ponds, as well as wet prairies. They tend to be found below the fall line but occasionally in low sandy pine hills. It has been found that their microhabitats largely coincide with high prey availability. They require a habitat with light soil, so they can burrow in it. Their range includes southeastern Virginia, eastern North Carolina, South Carolina, southern Georgia and Alabama, Florida, south Mississippi, Arkansas, Louisiana, and southeastern Texas.

== Behavior ==
Two-toed amphiumas are nocturnal, and are often difficult to handle because of their slippery skins. They may leave water temporarily if weather is wet enough. They dig burrows in muddy stream bottoms, or may invade the burrows of other aquatic creatures. They are primarily found in the littoral zones where fish and crayfish are most abundant and vegetation is floating, on logs, or submerged.

They are harmless to humans when left alone, but, when disturbed, they can deliver a tough bite, which may lead to a severe infection. A. means gives a clear whistle when disturbed. It has been studied that two-toed amphiumas utilize acoustic signals during social interactions for communications at short distances, as the species did not express these acoustics when housed individually. These acoustic signals can be described as "clicks". There are three discernable clicks produced, ranging in frequencies.

== Breeding ==
Amphiumas breed from June to July in North Carolina and northern Florida. Females lay about 200 eggs in a damp cavity beneath debris, close to standing water, and they remain coiled around them during incubation (which lasts around five months). These eggs are laid in strings. Hatchlings are about 2 in (51 mm) long with three pairs of light-colored external gills soon lost after hatching. In some conditions offspring can exhibit direct development and hatch without external gills. In a series of three studies conducted in northern Florida, two-toed amphiuma eggs hatched in response to inundation with water, can stand without feeding for 125 days by using resources from their yolk reserves, and the eggs can retain a period of no growth and still survive after 110 days on a moist substrate.

A study depicted seasonal lipid storage increases in males' testicular region and females' liver.

== Diet ==
Two-toed amphiumas feed on small fish, tadpoles, crawfish, insects and insect larvae. They are also recorded to prey on reptiles and amphibians such as southern cricket frogs, southern leopard frogs, greater sirens, peninsula newts, water snakes of the genus Nerodia and small mud turtles. When feeding, they have two types of suction feeding: buccal expansion with no forward movement of the head for small prey and buccal expansion with a rapid strike, sharp teeth, and rapid twisting to subdue larger prey. Their hunting behavior is not thoroughly understood, but they are believed to forage actively for food and to wait under debris and in burrows for prey to approach them. They likely detect prey through olfaction.
