= Rainbow snake =

Rainbow snake may refer to:

- Farancia erytrogramma, a species of snake native to the southeastern United States
- Rainbow Serpent, an Aboriginal Australian religious figure
