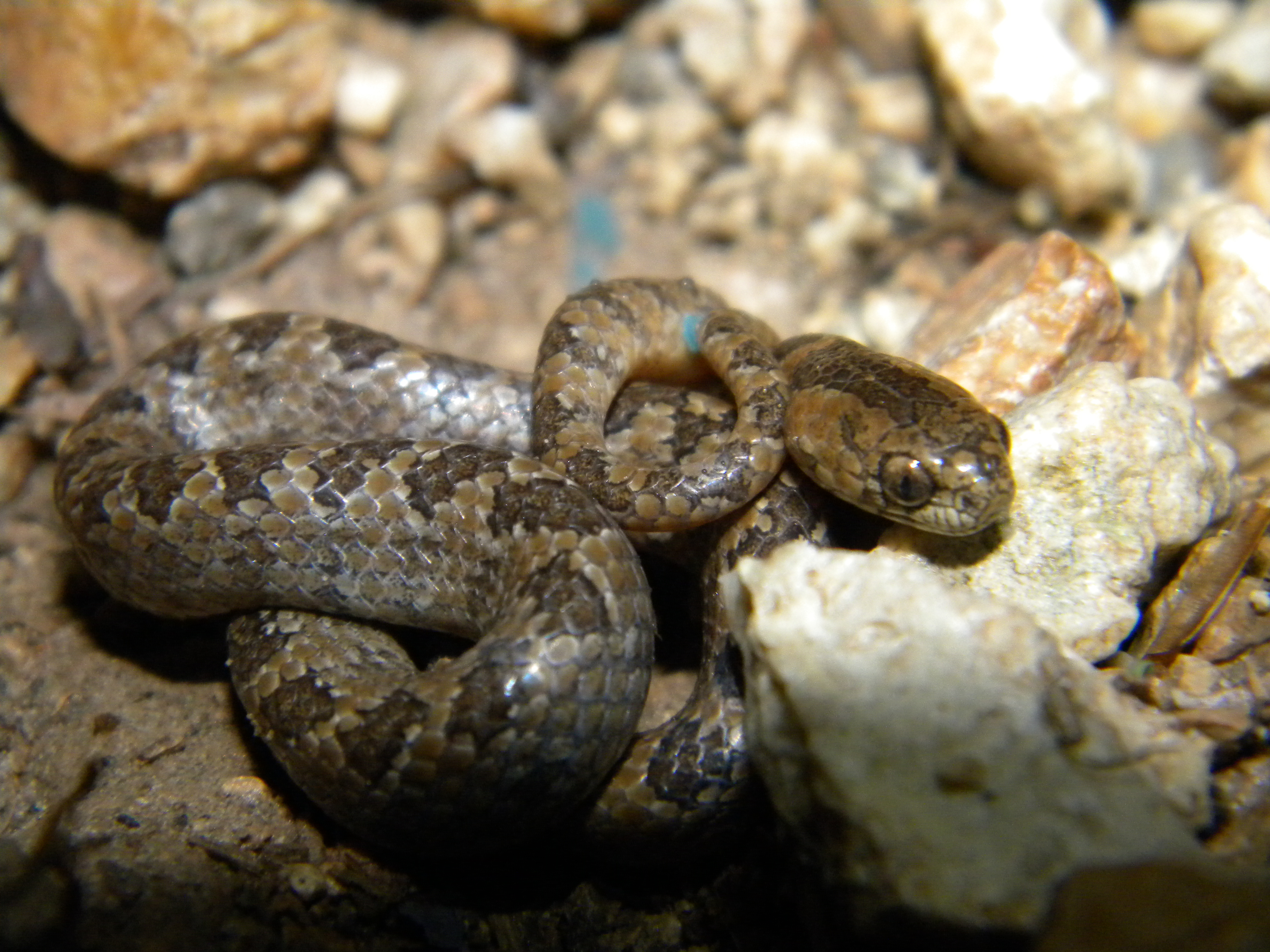

Conservation status
- Least Concern (IUCN 3.1)

Scientific classification
- Kingdom: Animalia
- Phylum: Chordata
- Class: Reptilia
- Order: Squamata
- Suborder: Serpentes
- Family: Colubridae
- Genus: Geophis
- Species: G. sanniolus

Binomial name
- Geophis sanniolus (Cope, 1866)

Synonyms
- Mesopeltis sanniolus Cope, 1866; Leptognathus sanniola — Bocourt, 1908; Sibynomorphus sanniola — Schmidt & Andrews, 1936; Sibon sanniolus — Liner, 1994; Sibon sanniola — Lee, 2000; Sibon sanniolus — Wallach, 2014; Geophis sanniolus — Grünwald et al., 2021

= Geophis sanniolus =

Species of snake

Geophis sanniolus, commonly known as the pygmy snail-eating snake or the pygmy snail sucker, is a species of small snake in the subfamily Dipsadinae of the family Colubridae. The species is native to Central America and southeastern Mexico.

== Geographic range ==
Geophis sanniolus is found in Belize, Guatemala, and the Mexican states of Campeche, Quintana Roo, and Yucatán.

== Habitat ==
Geophis sanniolus is a relatively common snake that occurs in tropical semi-deciduous forest and thorn forest, and also in degraded forest.

== Reproduction ==
An oviparous species, Geophis sanniolus reaches sexual maturity in eight months and produces a single clutch per year.

== Subspecies ==
Two subspecies are recognized as being valid, including the nominotypical subspecies.

- Geophis sanniolus neilli Henderson, Hoevers & Wilson, 1977 – Neill's snail sucker
- Geophis sanniolus sanniolus (Cope, 1866)

Nota bene: A trinomial authority or a binomial authority in parentheses indicates that the subspecies or species was originally described in a genus other than Geophis.

== Etymology ==
The subspecific name, neilli, is in honor of American herpetologist Wilfred T. Neill.
