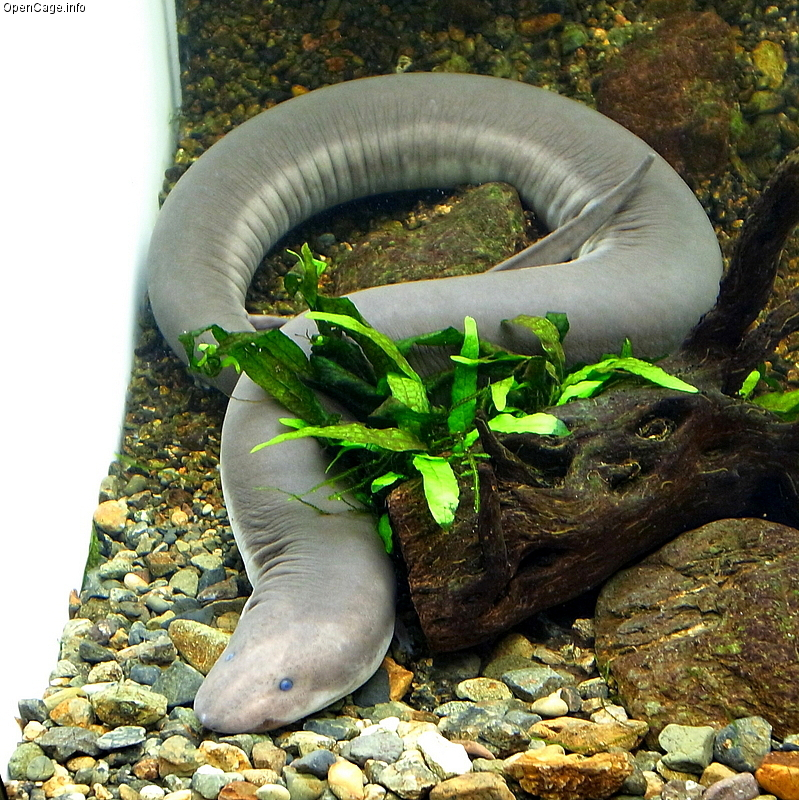

Conservation status
- Least Concern (IUCN 3.1)

- Secure (NatureServe)

Scientific classification
- Kingdom: Animalia
- Phylum: Chordata
- Class: Amphibia
- Order: Urodela
- Family: Amphiumidae
- Genus: Amphiuma
- Species: A. tridactylum

Binomial name
- Amphiuma tridactylum Cuvier, 1827

Synonyms
- Syren quadrapeda Custis, 1807; Muraenopsis tridactyla (Cuvier, 1843)

= Amphiuma tridactylum =

Three-toed amphiuma

Species of amphibian

Amphiuma tridactylum, the three-toed amphiuma, is a species of aquatic salamander native to the Southeastern United States.

== Description ==
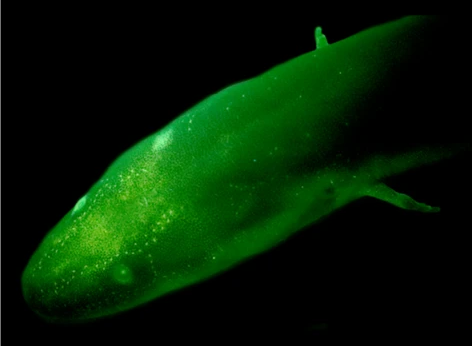
Biofluorescence in a three-toed amphiuma

The three-toed amphiuma looks rather eel-like, with an elongate, dark gray-black, or brown colored body, and tiny vestigial legs. A large salamander, one record sized individual was recorded at 41.25 inches (104.8 cm), but 18–30 inches (46–76 cm) is the typical size of an average adult. They have small, lidless eyes, and gill slits. They have four tiny legs each with three toes and an average of 62 costal grooves.

== Distribution ==
The three-toed amphiuma is found in the United States, along the Gulf of Mexico states, from Alabama to Texas, and north to Missouri, Arkansas, Tennessee and Kentucky. It is often found in bottomland marshes and lakes, seeps, bayous, cypress sloughs, and streams in areas with limestone bedrock. It frequently occupies crayfish burrows and may be found in manmade ditches.

== Behavior ==
Amphiumas are nocturnal carnivores. They spend most of the time hiding in heavily vegetated areas of permanent bodies of slow moving water, such as swamps, ponds and lakes. They may venture out of the water after heavy rain. Amphiumas feed on earthworms, fish, other amphibians, small reptiles, crustaceans (mainly crayfish), and other small invertebrates (such as insects and snails). Their broad diet often results in amphiumas being caught as bycatch by fishermen. They mate from December to June and subsequently nest from April to October. Unlike other amphiumas, they fertilize internally. About 200 eggs are laid in a single strand in an underwater cavity. Males have five sets of cloacal glands, with the posterior set being different in its morphology and histology. Multiple cloacas may contribute to the ability of males to court and mate with many females in quick succession, as multiple spermatophores can be produced simultaneously. This allows males to avoid wasting extra energy producing another spermatophore after each mating session, and consequently creates a polygynous dynamic between the individuals.

== Biology ==
The three-toed amphiuma has the largest recorded red blood cells of any animal measuring 70x40 μm.

== Predation ==
Mud snakes, cottonmouths and king snakes are predators of Amphiuma tridactylum.
