= Wilfred T. Neill =

American zoologist (1922–2001)

Wilfred T. Neill (1922–2001) was an American herpetologist and author. His name survives in the scientific names of the central Florida crowned snake, Tantilla relicta neilli, and a Central American snail-eating snake, Sibon sanniolus neilli.

== Early life ==
Wilfred Trammell Neill, Jr., was born in Augusta, Georgia, on January 12, 1922. He graduated at the age of 19 with a B.S. from the University of Georgia. He served in the Army Air Force in the South Pacific during World War II.

=== Research ===
After the war, Neill taught Biology and Zoology in Augusta, Georgia, at Richmond Academy and Augusta Junior College. In 1949, he joined E. Ross Allen's Reptile Institute in Silver Springs, Florida, as Research Director.

Neill was the first to describe the Everglades rat snake (Elaphe obsoleta rossalleni, a subspecies of Elaphe obsoleta, 1949), the Gulf hammock dwarf siren (Pseudobranchus striatus lustricolus, a subspecies of Pseudobranchus striatus, 1951), the one-toed amphiuma (Amphiuma pholeter, 1964), and the southern Florida rainbow snake (Farancia erytrogramma seminola, a subspecies of Farancia erytrogramma, 1964).

In 1966, herpetologist Sam Rountree Telford, Jr. honored Neill by giving his name to a newly described subspecies of the Florida crowned snake (Tantilla relicta), naming it Tantilla relicta neilli. Similarly, a subspecies of pygmy snail-eating snake, Sibon sanniolus neilli, was named in his honor by Henderson, Hoevers, and Wilson in 1977.

In 1956 Neill's The Story of Florida's Seminole Indians was published by Great Outdoors Publishing of St Petersburg, Florida. The book and photos tell the history and culture of these people and includes two excellent drawings by the author.

Neill published an influential work on crocodile biology in 1971: The Last of the Ruling Reptiles: Alligators, Crocodiles, and their Kin.

=== Illness and death ===
Neill's health suffered a decline after a nearly fatal snakebite in 1978. It was the forty-first time he had been bitten by a venomous snake. He died of pneumonia on February 19, 2001, in Lakeland, Florida.
