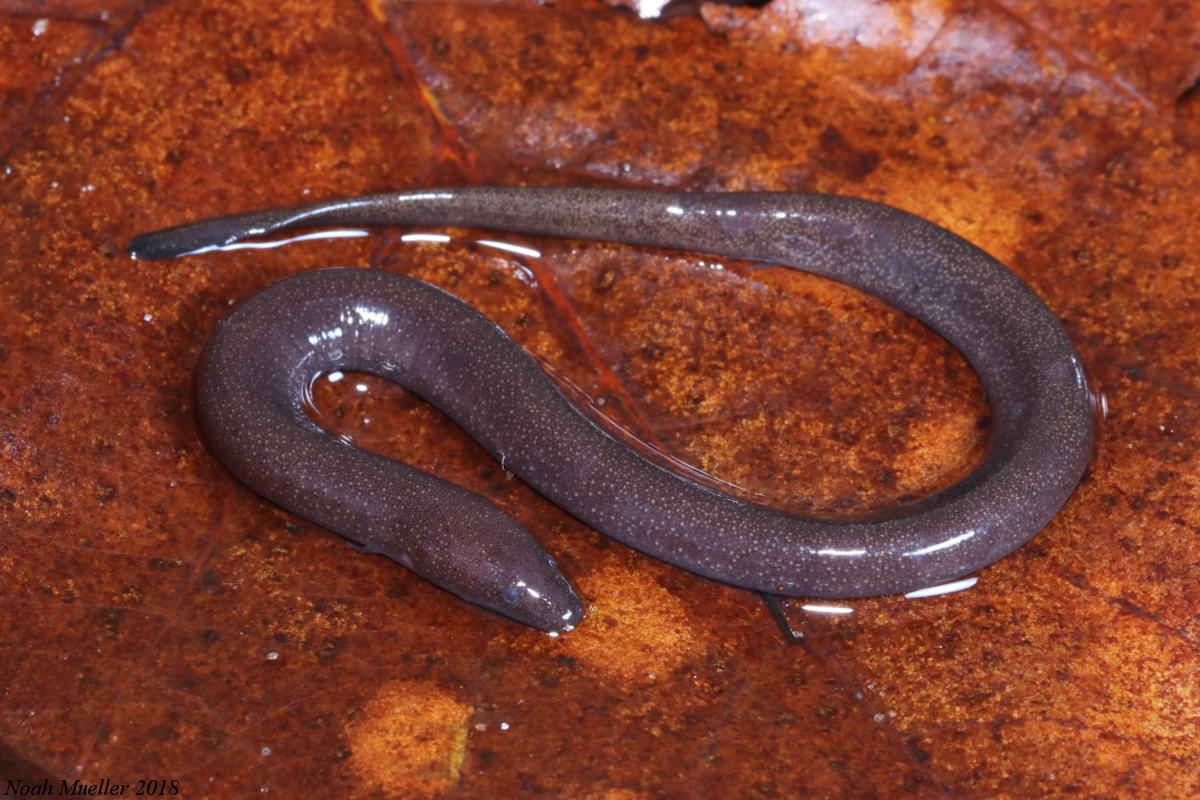

Conservation status
- Least Concern (IUCN 3.1)

- Apparently Secure (NatureServe)

Scientific classification
- Kingdom: Animalia
- Phylum: Chordata
- Class: Amphibia
- Order: Urodela
- Family: Amphiumidae
- Genus: Amphiuma
- Species: A. pholeter

Binomial name
- Amphiuma pholeter Neill, 1964

= Amphiuma pholeter =

One-toed amphiuma

Species of amphibian

Amphiuma pholeter, commonly known as the one-toed amphiuma, is a species of aquatic, eel-like salamander in the family Amphiumidae. The species is native to the southeastern United States. It was unknown to science until 1950, when it was collected by herpetologist Wilfred T. Neill, who described it as a new species in 1964. It is rarely observed in the wild, and much about the species remains uncertain.

== Description ==
The one-toed amphiuma is considered aquatic, and ranges in coloration from gray-black to purplish-brown. Unlike the other two Amphiuma species which have distinctively lighter undersides, the one-toed amphiuma is the same color on both the dorsum (back) and the venter (belly). It can also be distinguished by its cone-shaped head and number of toes. The one-toed amphiuma has one toe on each foot as opposed to the two or three exhibited by other Amphiuma species. It is the smallest species in the genus Amphiuma with the average adult size being 8.5 inches (220 mm).

== Geographic range ==
The one-toed amphiuma is known only to occur in parts of the Florida panhandle, extreme southern Georgia, and southern Alabama.

== Behavior ==
The one-toed amphiuma is active mostly at night, when it forages for invertebrate prey. Its habits are similar to those of the other members of its genus, preferring slow moving or stagnant, shallow water with either muddy bottoms or areas with weedy vegetation. It has a special affinity for the semi-fluid mud deposits that accumulate in the swampy floodplains of rivers and streams or along the edges of coastal spring-fed rivers. Like all amphiumas, the one-toed amphiuma eats small, aquatic invertebrates such as crayfish, annelid worms, insect larvae, and occasionally fish or amphibian larvae. Its breeding habits are largely unknown and eggs and hatchlings have never been observed.
