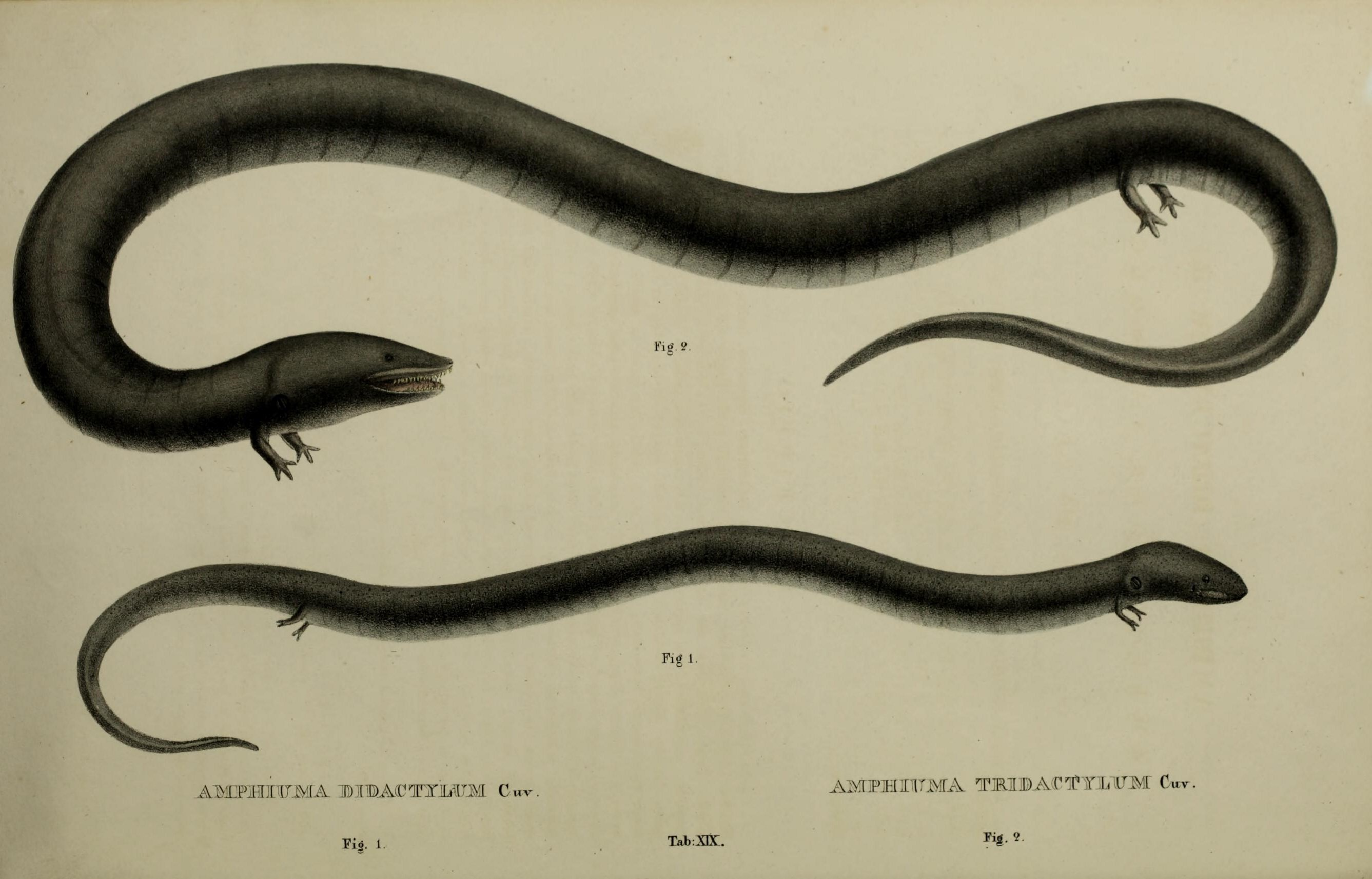
- Two-toed and three-toed amphiumas

Scientific classification
- Kingdom: Animalia
- Phylum: Chordata
- Class: Amphibia
- Order: Urodela
- Suborder: Salamandroidea
- Family: Amphiumidae; Gray, 1825
- Genus: Amphiuma; Garden, 1821

Species
- Amphiuma means Amphiuma pholeter Amphiuma tridactylum

= Amphiuma =

Amphiuma Temporal range: Paleocene–present

Genus of salamanders

Amphiuma is a genus of aquatic salamanders from the southeastern United States, the only extant genus within the family Amphiumidae /æmfɪˈjuːmɪdiː/. They are colloquially known as amphiumas. They are also known to fishermen as "conger eels" or "Congo snakes", which are zoologically incorrect designations or misnomers, since amphiumas are actually salamanders (and thus amphibians), and not eels (fish), nor reptiles and are not from Congo. Amphiuma exhibits one of the largest complements of DNA in the living world, around 25 times more than a human.

== Taxonomy ==
Numerous phylogenetic studies have indicated that amphiumas form a clade with the families Rhyacotritonidae (torrent salamanders) and Plethodontidae (lungless salamanders), with an especially close relationship to Plethodontidae. Despite this possible relationship, the two families must have still diverged very early on. The genus Proamphiuma from the Cretaceous is the earliest known member of the family, and closely resembles the modern species aside from less elaborate vertebral structures.

== Description ==
Amphiumas have an elongated body, generally grey-black in color. They do have legs, but they are merely vestigial and very small. While amphiumas can be up to 116 cm (46 in) long, their legs measure only up to about 2 cm (0.79 in). It is because of this that they are often mistaken for eels or snakes. They also lack eyelids and a tongue. Amphiumas also have a lateral line visible on the sides of their bodies, which is capable of detecting movement and is used in aid of hunting.

Female amphiumas lay their eggs in wet mud, and then remain coiled around them for about five months, until they hatch. The larvae have external gills, but after about four months these external gills disappear and the lungs begin to work. One pair of gill slits is retained and never disappears, so the metamorphosis remains incomplete.

=== Species ===
There are three extant amphiuma species, distinguished by the number of toes:

==== Extant ====
Image	Common name	Scientific name	Distribution
	Three-toed amphiuma	Amphiuma tridactylum	Southeastern United States
	Two-toed amphiuma	Amphiuma means	Southeastern United States
	One-toed amphiuma	Amphiuma pholeter	Central Florida, Florida panhandle, extreme southern Georgia, and southern Alabama

==== Extinct ====
- †Amphiuma jepseni (Paleocene of Wyoming)
- †Amphiuma antica (Miocene of Texas)

== Distribution ==
Amphiumas inhabit the southeastern part of the United States. They share much of the same distribution with the sirens, although they are not closely related.

In the past, amphiumas had a wider geographic range throughout North America, ranging all the way north to Wyoming.

== Behavior ==
During the day, amphiumas hide in vegetation, and at night they become active hunters. Their prey includes frogs, snakes, fish, crustaceans, insects and even other amphiumas. Hunting and eating habits have been observed to be very similar to that of the axolotl, including the sucking in of food by their stomachs with vacuum force. If provoked, they can become aggressive. They can be found in most wetlands in the coastal plain of the southeastern U.S., even ones which periodically dry out, as they are able to estivate in the moist mud below drained marshland and other ephemeral wetlands. Amphiumas are rarely encountered on land.

It is the female that courts the male before mating. When a pair is formed they wrap their bodies around each other, and the male will transfer a spermatophore directly into the female cloaca (cloacal apposition).

=== Food habits ===
The amphiuma's predatory behaviors and food selection are very calculated and variable depending on abundance of food. In addition to eating frogs, snakes, fish, crustaceans, insects, and other amphiuma, amphiuma have been found to eat annelids, vegetables, arachnids, mollusca, and larvae. Amphiuma seem to have a preference for eating crawfish. It has been documented that amphiuma will pass on smaller crawfish in order to consume larger ones. It is suggested that this limits wasting energy in pursuing prey with less caloric density. In captivity, the predatory behavior amphiuma display depends on the presence or lack of food. Amphiuma will remain inactive when food is absent, and will become more active once food has been introduced into their habitat. This shows that the amphiuma, although ancestral to many amphibia, has developed a deductive approach to its predation.

== Anatomy ==
=== Jaw muscles ===
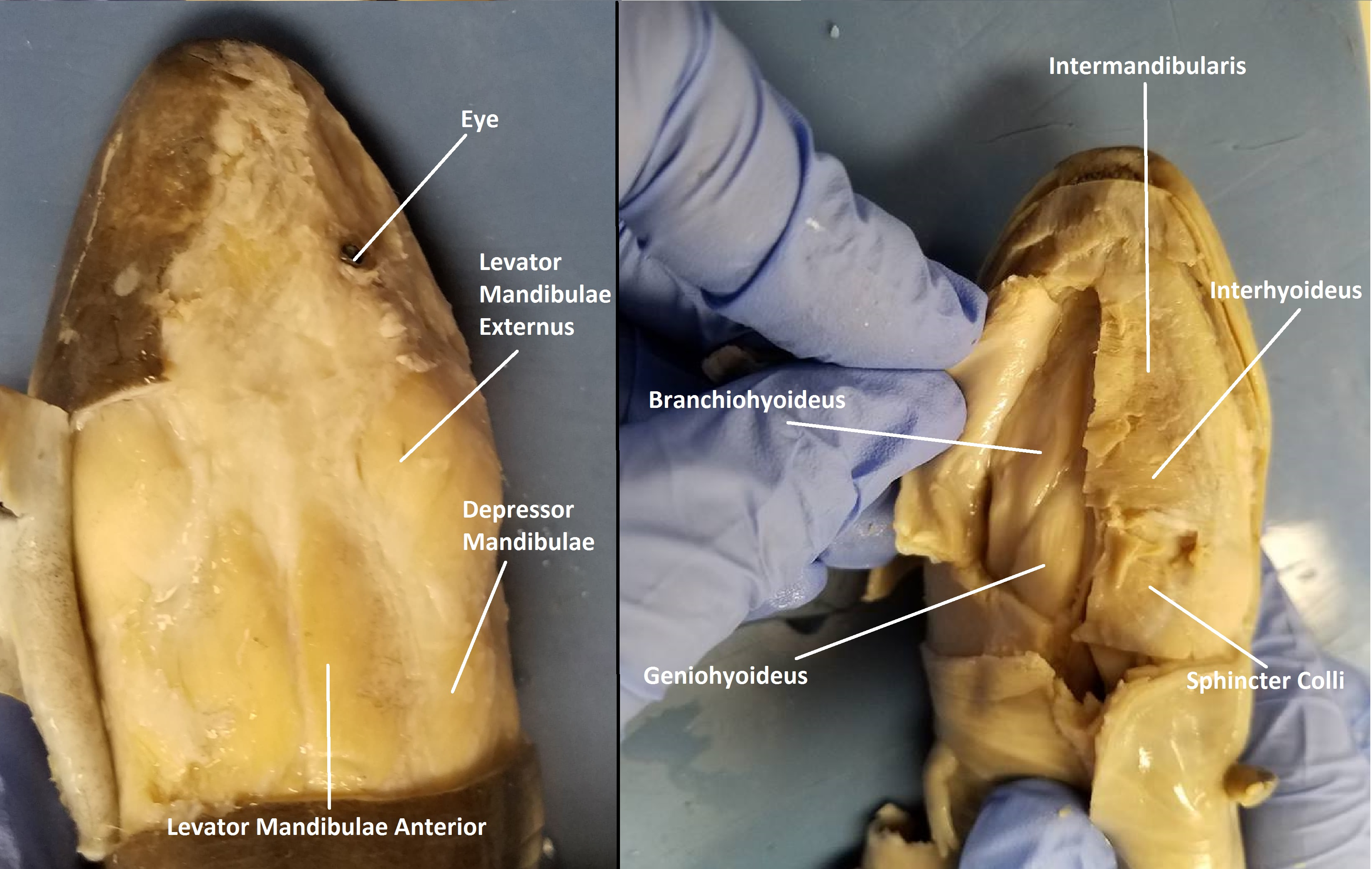
Musculature of upper and lower Jaw in Amphiuma. Specimen from the Pacific Lutheran University Natural History collection, dissection and photos by Misty Lang and Nina Thach

Amphiumas are primarily carnivorous amphibians that consume crayfish, insects, and other small invertebrates. Similar to many salamanders, the amphiuma has two distinct forms of suction feeding procedures: stationary and strike. Stationary suction feeding involve little to no movement where it opens the mouth with buccal expansion but no forward movement of the body. Strike suction is rapid motion where the mouth opens and buccal expansion occurs synchronously leading to a quick attack. These two feeding habits give the amphiuma the ability to have a larger variety of food (live or dead). The ability to displace the jaw when feeding means they can consume a large variety of organisms, but being relatively narrow jaw makes it harder to fully consume large prey such as crayfish or mice. In these cases, they will use one of the forms of suction feeding and then rip the prey into pieces until fully consumed. Small prey will be pulled completely into the mouth before being eaten. Structure of the teeth within the jaw tend to be arched caudal on the head. The muscles of the jaw give them the ability to grab and hold on to prey as well as create a negative pressure to suck in the prey and displace the jaw. Muscles of note in the amphiuma include: the levator mandibulae anterior and levator mandibulae externus, which elevate the lower jaw of the amphiuma while the depressor mandibulae depresses the lower jaw. The intermandubularis works by tensing the mouth floor. The branchiohyoideus and geniohyoideus draws the hyoid arch which causes the suction and displacement.

=== Lungs ===
Amphiuma possess relatively ancestral forms of lungs compared to some of the other groups of salamanders that live terrestrially today. Their lungs are long organs, extending over half of the body length, with dense capillary networks and large surface area that suggest the utilization of the entire lung for respiration while the animal is in water or on land. Although it is common for amphibia to respire out of their skin, also known as cutaneous respiration, it was found that amphiuma primarily respire through their lungs, despite their aquatic lifestyle. This is suggested by the high lung to respiratory capillary density compared to the relatively low skin to respiratory capillary density.

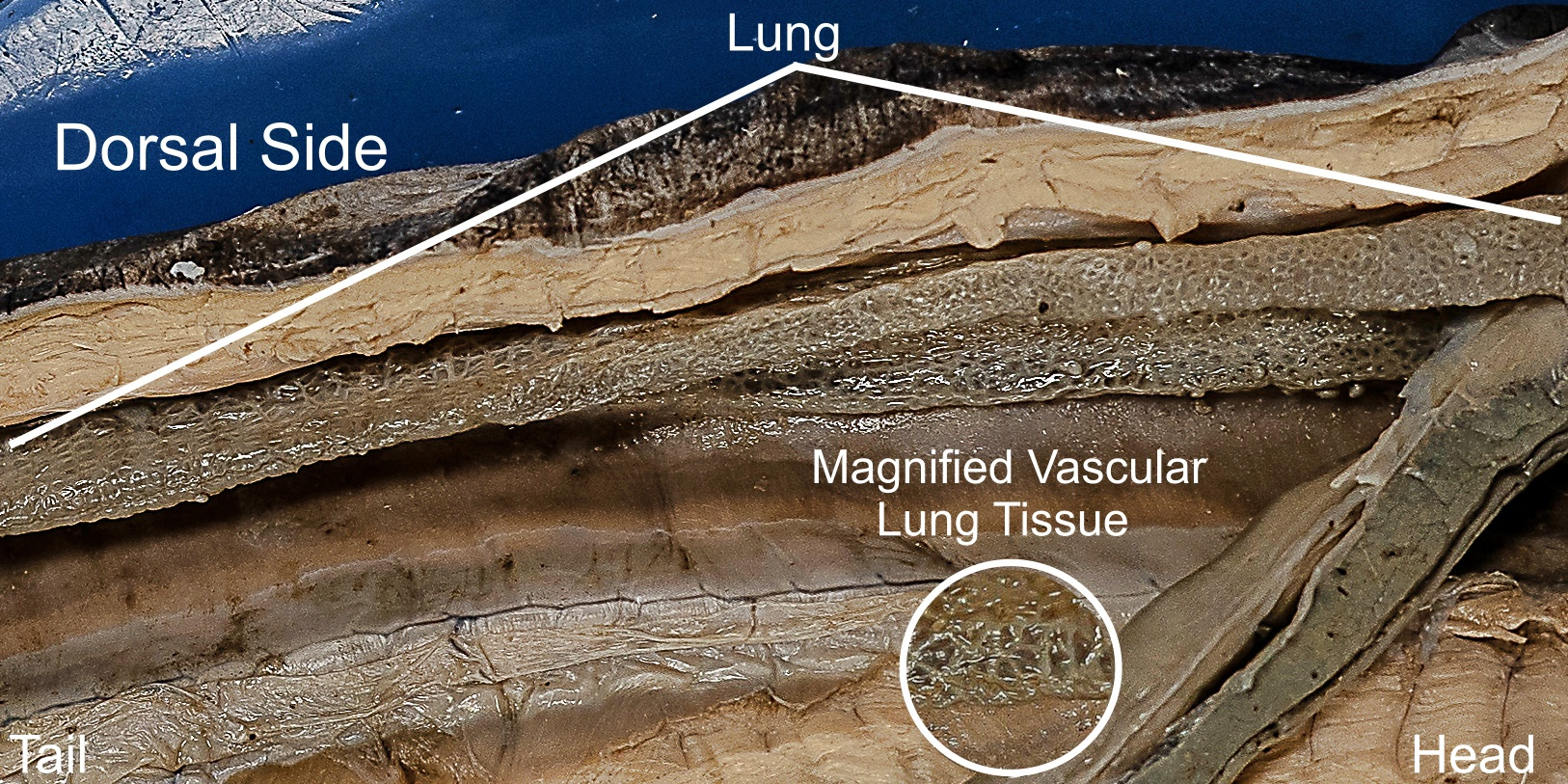
Amphiuma lung with a magnified portion of the lung to show the amphiuma vascular tissue.

==== Respiration ====
Pressure gradients for respiration occur in two different locations, the buccal cavity/nares (mouth and nostril) region, and in the lungs of the amphiuma. The first system for respiration occurs in the buccal cavity/nares through a two-cycle pressure-induced buccal cavity/nares process. In the first system, the amphiuma performs one full cycle of body expansion and compression in order to inhale and another full cycle to exhale, a unique process that utilizes both the buccal cavity and the nares (openings of nostrils). The buccal cavity creates pressure that aids in driving the cycles of expansion and compression required for respiration, although it was found that the buccal pressure gradient alone was not enough to drive respiration in the Amphiuma tridactylum. Rather, the buccal cavity allows for small pressure changes that are thought to have an olfactory purpose. This buccal cavity/nares component to the amphiuma respiratory process supplements the contribution performed by the lung. It is the pressure control performed in the lungs that drive the inhalation and exhalation forces through the flexing of smooth muscle in the lung. In order to exhale, amphiuma push air from their lungs into their buccal cavity, distending the cavity, before releasing the air. Without inhaling, amphiuma repeat the process, exhaling a second volume of air that allows them to completely empty their lungs. Only after both exhales can they then inhale, using a negative pressure gradient made by the smooth muscles in their lungs to take in air.

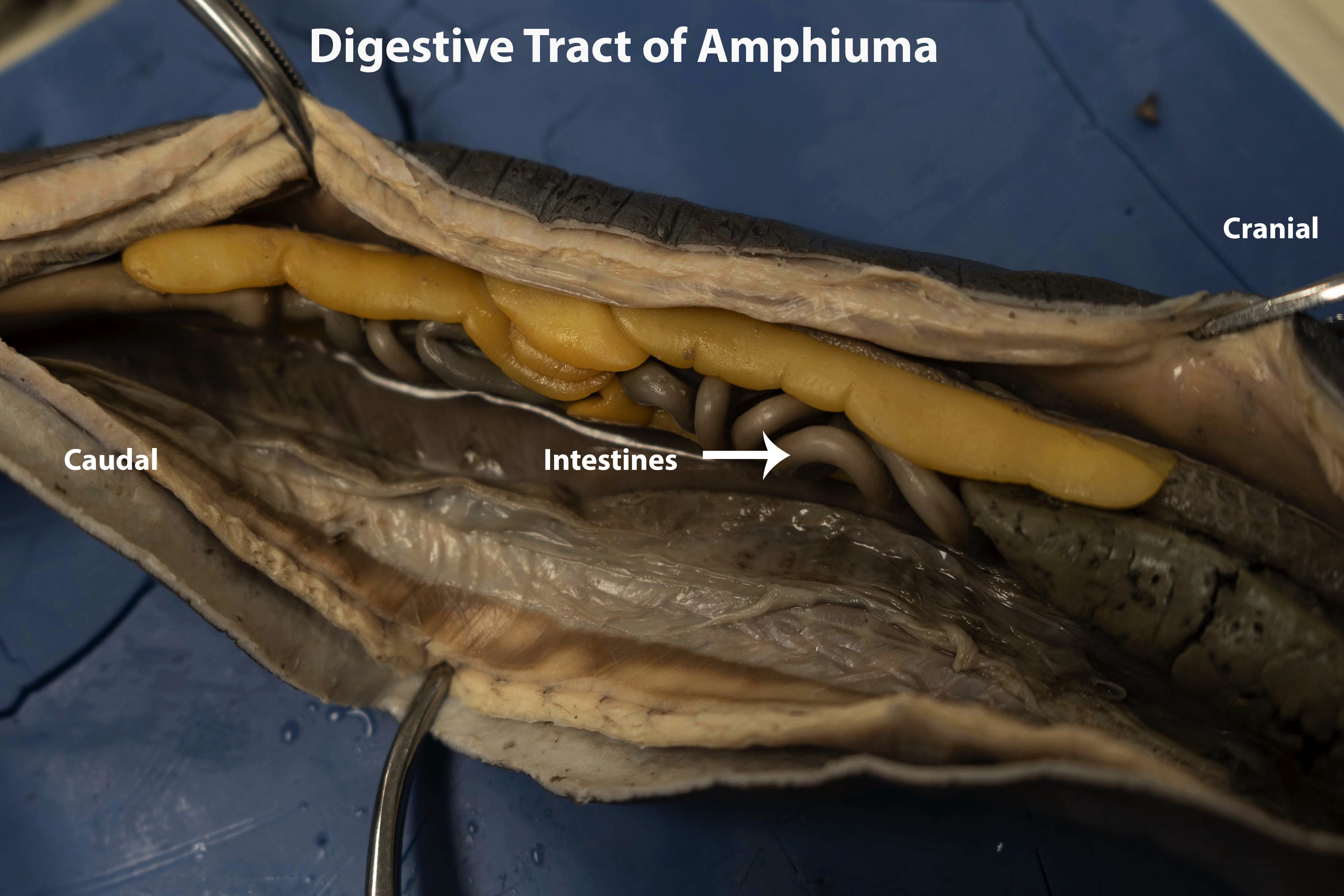
Amphiuma digestive tract. Specimen from the Pacific Lutheran University Natural History collection, dissection and photos by Misty Lang and Nina Thach.

== Sexual dimorphism ==
Amphiuma demonstrate sexual dimorphism in relation to the size of their bodies and the size of their heads. Generally, males have been found to possess larger bodies and longer heads compared to the female sex, which normally is indicative of male-male combat observed within the population. There has been, however, no other physical indicating factors for male-male combat as in other species of amphibians, such as horns or spines. Some populations do not show these sexual dimorphic traits, and in certain locations female and male bodies do not exhibit any traits with significant differences.

Amphiumas may be sexed as male or female based on the pigmentation of the cloacal opening. Males exhibit white or pink coloration while females exhibit dark pigmentation. Occasionally, males may demonstrate partial pigmentation, but never have full dark coloration like that of females.
