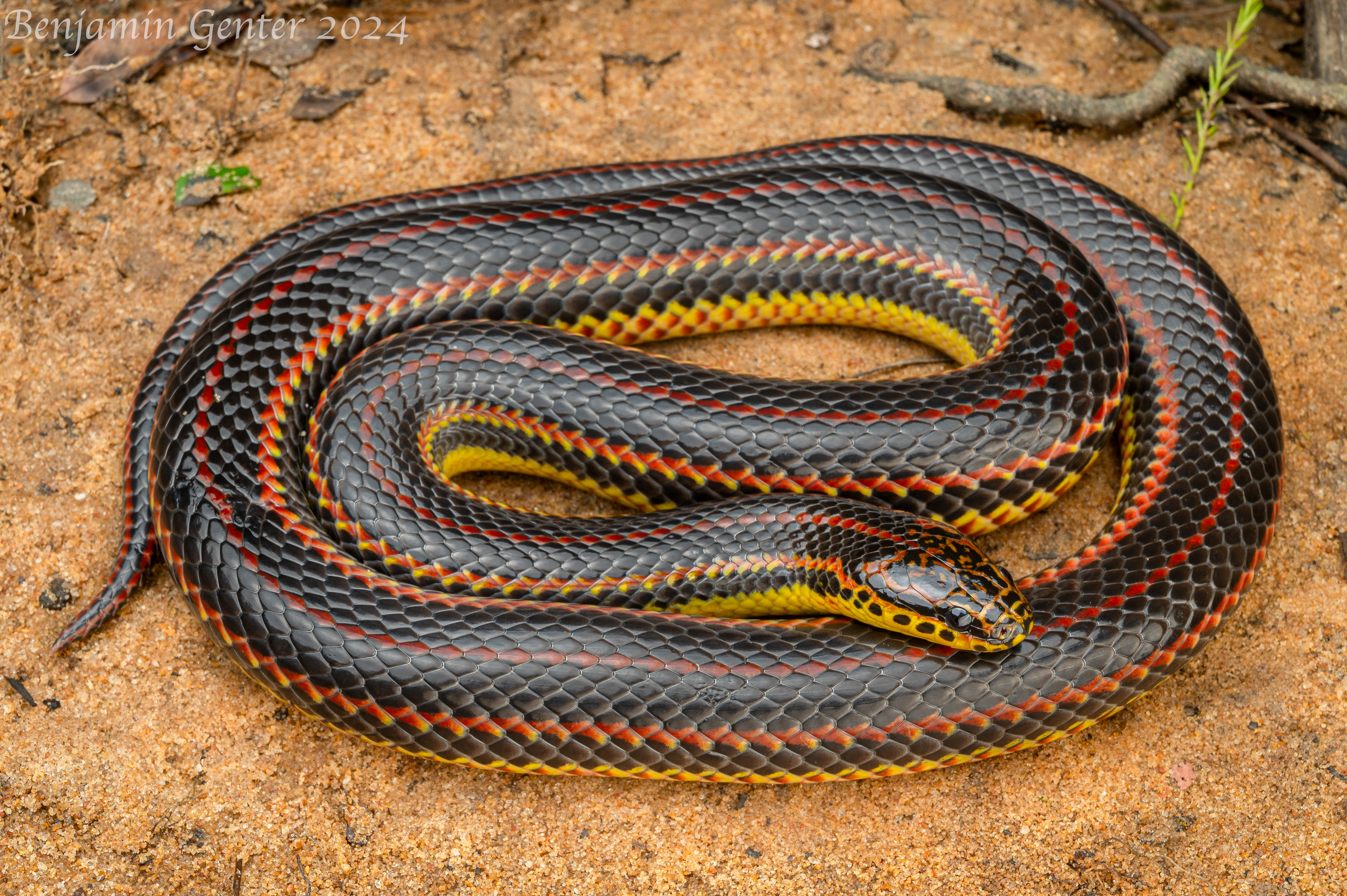
- Adult from southern Georgia, whole body
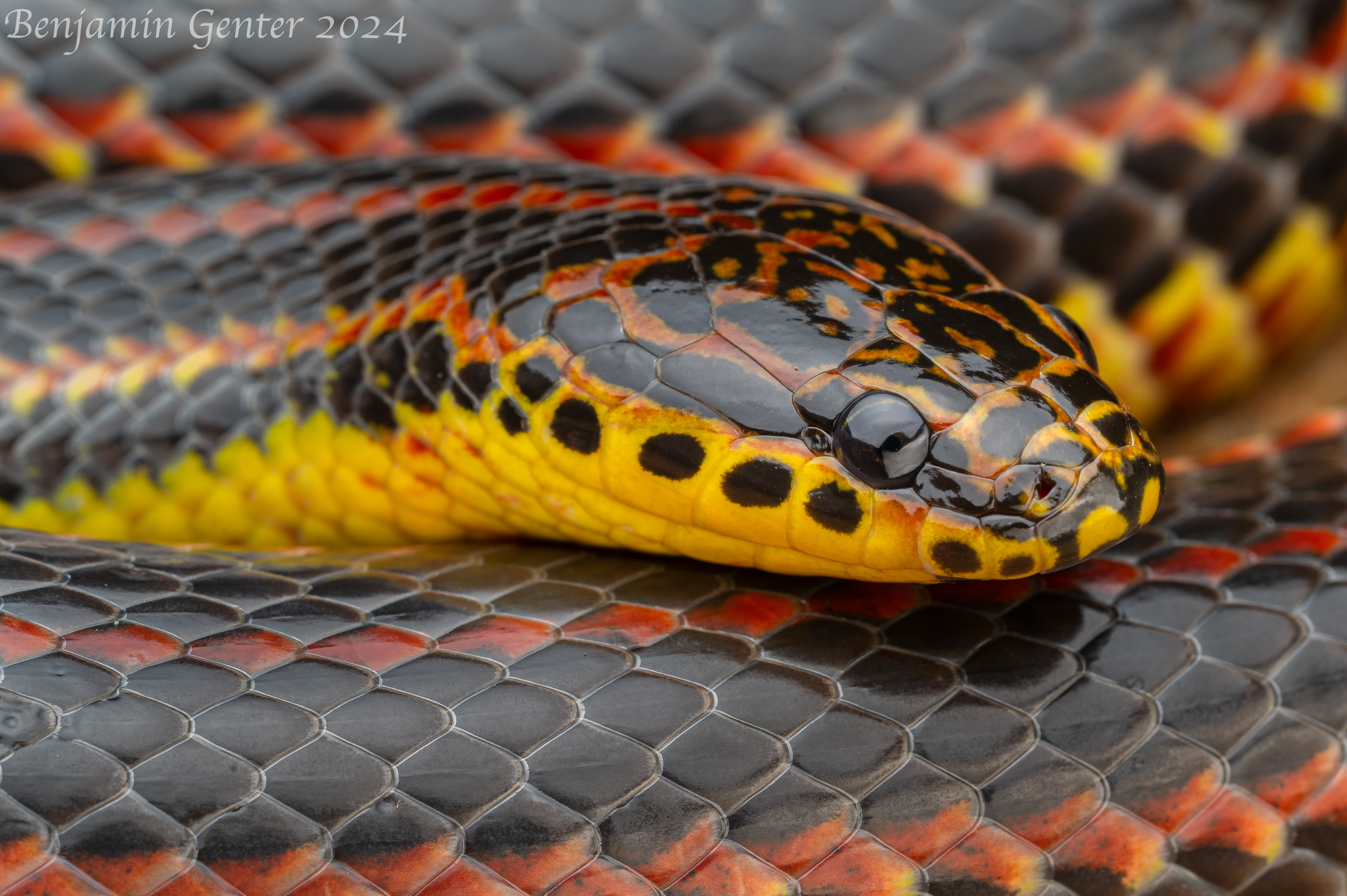
- Adult from southern Georgia, macro view of head

Conservation status
- Least Concern (IUCN 3.1)

Scientific classification
- Kingdom: Animalia
- Phylum: Chordata
- Order: Squamata
- Suborder: Serpentes
- Family: Colubridae
- Genus: Farancia
- Species: F. erytrogramma

Binomial name
- Farancia erytrogramma (Palisot de Beauvois, 1802)
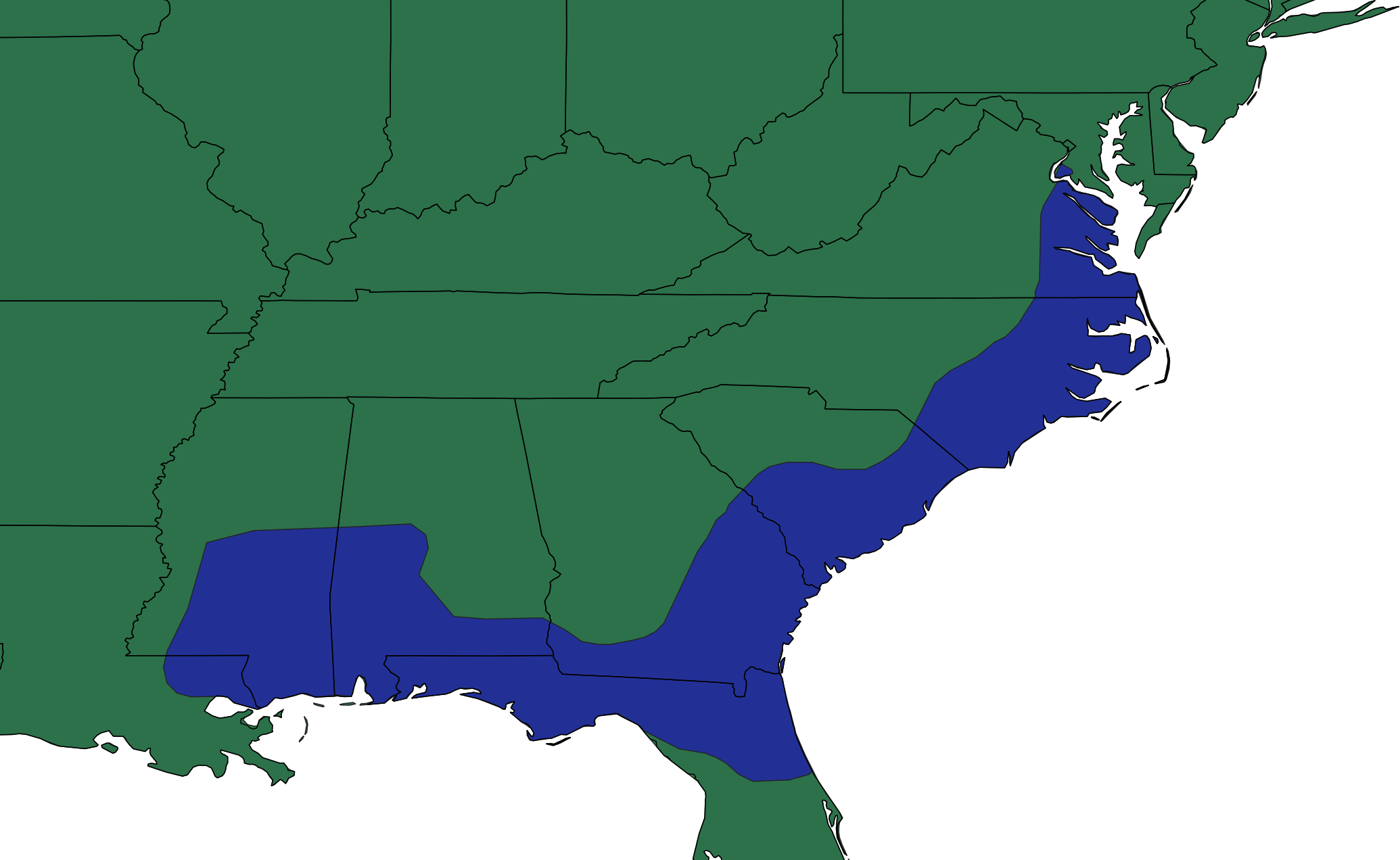

Synonyms
- List: Coluber erytrogrammus Palisot de Beauvois, 1802 in Sonnini & Latreille, 1802; Coluber erythrogrammus — Daudin, 1803; Natrix erythrogrammus — Merrem, 1820; Homalopsis erythrogrammus — F. Boie, 1827; Helicops erythrogrammus — Wagler, 1830; Abastor erythrogrammus — Gray, 1849; Calopisma erythrogrammum — A.M.C. Duméril, Bibron, A.H.A. Duméril, 1854; Homolopsis parviceps Blyth, 1854; Hydrops erythrogrammus — Sclater, 1861; Abastor erytrogrammus — Theobald, 1868; Abastor erythrogramus — Cochran, 1952; Farancia erytrogramma — Conant, 1975

= Farancia erytrogramma =

Species of reptile

Farancia erytrogramma (also known commonly as the rainbow snake, and less frequently as the eel moccasin) is a species of large, nonvenomous, highly amphibious colubrid snake, endemic to the coastal plains of the southeastern United States. Two subspecies are recognized as being valid, one of which has been declared extinct.

== Common names ==
Other common names for F. erytrogramma include horn snake, red-lined snake, red-lined horned snake, red-sided snake, sand hog, sand snake, and striped wampum.

== Description ==
Dorsally, rainbow snakes have smooth, glossy bluish-black back scales, with three red stripes. They have short tails, with a spiny tip which they sometimes use as a probe. Adults may show yellow coloration along the sides and on the head.

They usually grow to a total length (including tail) of 36-48 inches (91–122 cm), although some specimens have been recorded up to 66 inches (168 cm) in total length. Females are larger than males.

Gallery of Farancia erytrogramma images
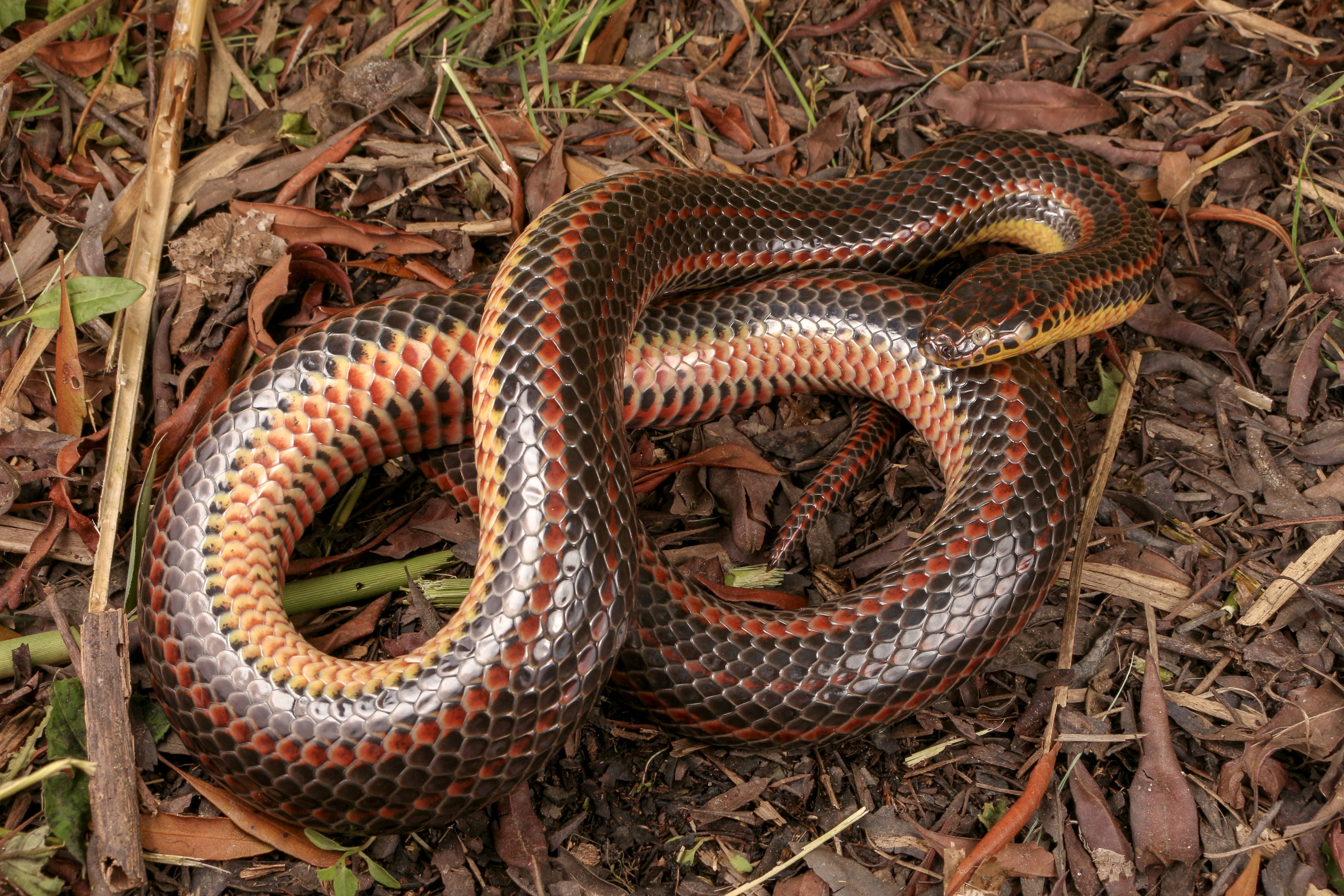
An adult male rainbow snake found in Virginia. This individual has a severely clouded eye - a common symptom of a fungal infection

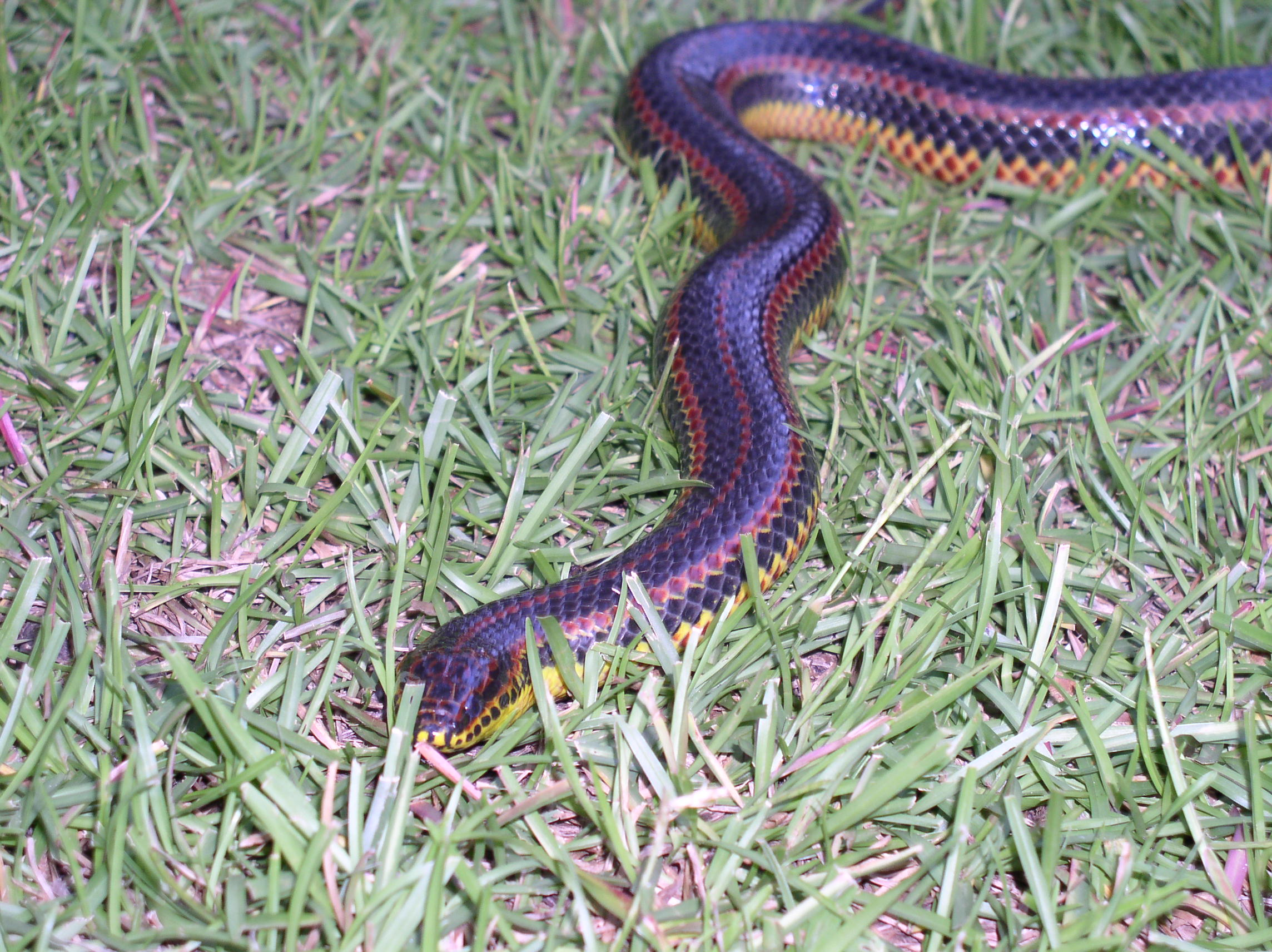
F. erytrogramma in southern Georgia, showing dorsal coloration

== Behavior ==
Rainbow snakes are rarely seen due to their secretive habits. They spend most of their lives in the water, hiding in aquatic vegetation or other forms of cover. They are strong swimmers, and also know how to burrow into mud and sand. Rainbow snakes are not aggressive when captured, and do not bite their captors.

In New Kent County, Virginia, they are abundant in sandy fields near the Chickahominy River, and great numbers are turned up by plows in the spring.

== Diet ==
Rainbow snakes subsist mainly on eels, but also prey on fish, earthworms, small frogs, tadpoles, and salamanders. They eat their prey alive, usually swallowing them head first.

== Reproduction ==
Adult female rainbow snakes usually lay their eggs in July, leaving them underground in sandy soil. A clutch consists of around 20 eggs on average, but large females may lay over 50. The young are hatched in late summer or fall.

== Habitat ==
Rainbow snakes are found in aquatic habitats ranging from cypress swamps and marshes to blackwater creeks, slow-moving streams, and sandy coastal plain.

== Geographic range ==
F. erytrogramma is found from southern Maryland to southeastern Louisiana, including eastern Virginia, southeastern North Carolina, South Carolina, Georgia, northern Florida, Alabama and Mississippi. A small population once inhabited the Lake Okeechobee region of southern Florida, but was declared extinct on October 5, 2011. One was seen at the Ocala National Forest, in Marion County, in early 2020, with the sighting being confirmed by the National Museum of Florida as the first in 50 years at the site.

== Subspecies ==
There are two recognized subspecies of F. erytrogramma:

- Farancia erytrogramma erytrogramma (Palisot de Beauvois, 1802) – Common rainbow snake
- †Farancia erytrogramma seminola (Neill, 1964) – Southern Florida rainbow snake; declared extinct (October 5, 2011)
