= List of amphibians and reptiles of Guadeloupe =

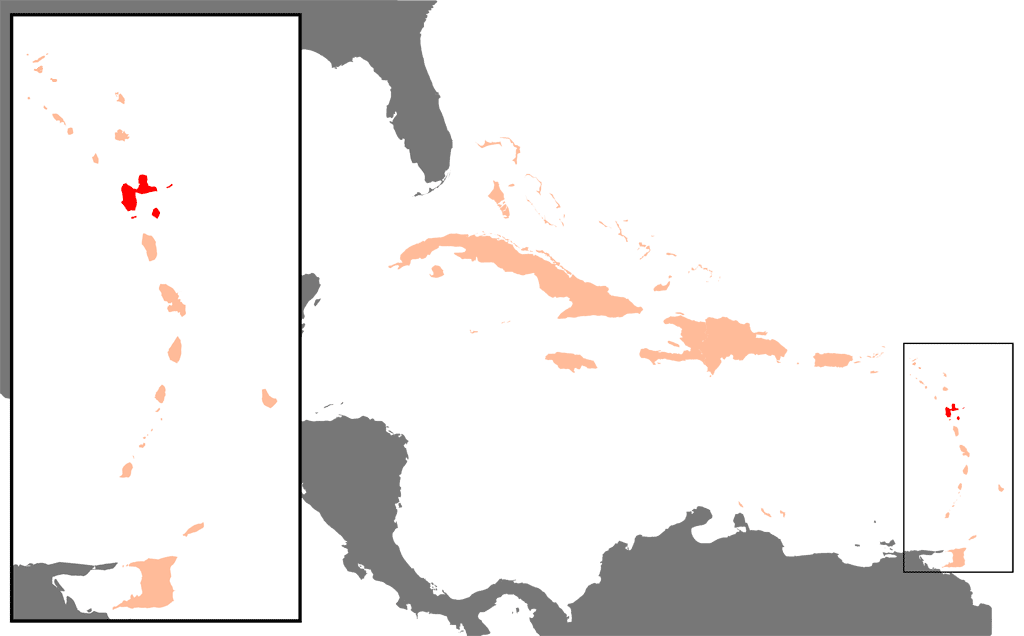
Location of Guadeloupe in the Caribbean

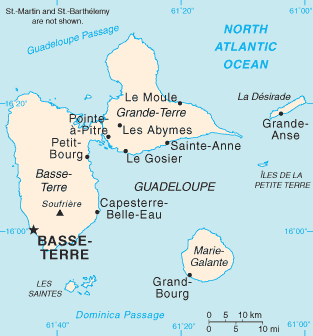
Map of Guadeloupe

This is a list of amphibians and reptiles found in Guadeloupe, in the Caribbean. The main islands of Guadeloupe are Basse-Terre, Grande-Terre), Îles des Saintes, La Désirade, and Marie-Galante.

== Amphibians ==
There are six species of amphibian in Guadeloupe, three of which were introduced. Two species of frog, Eleutherodactylus barlagnei and Eleutherodactylus pinchoni, are endemic to Guadeloupe.

=== Frogs (Anura) ===
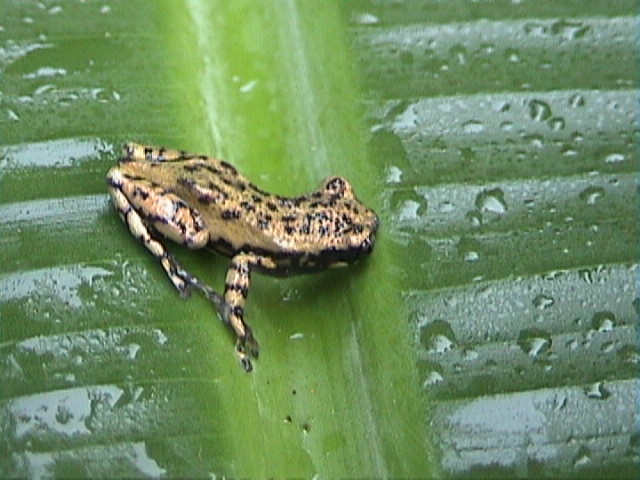
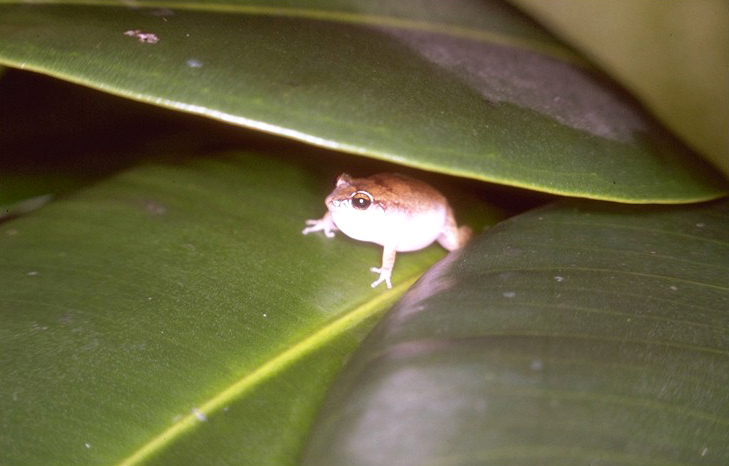
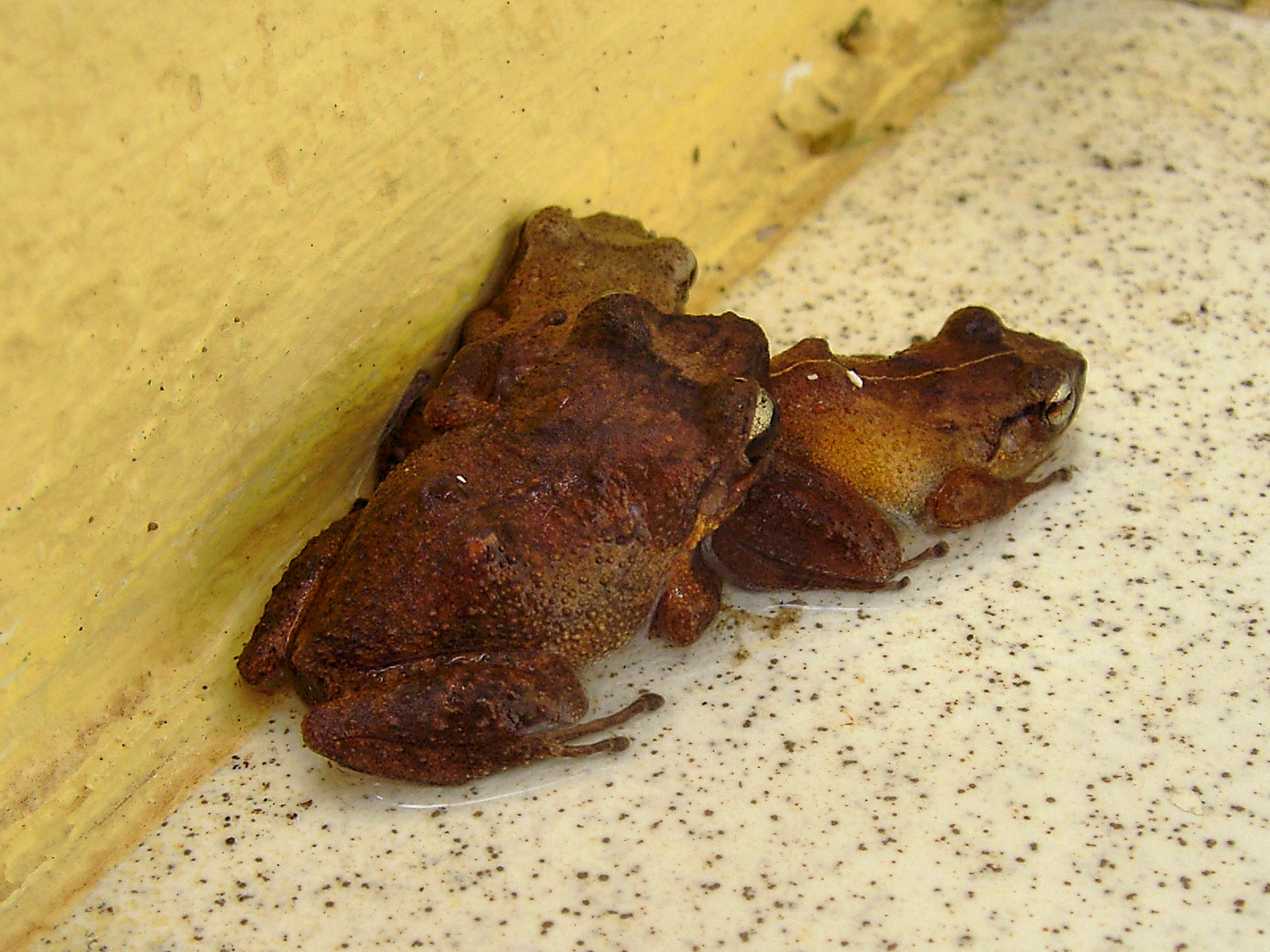
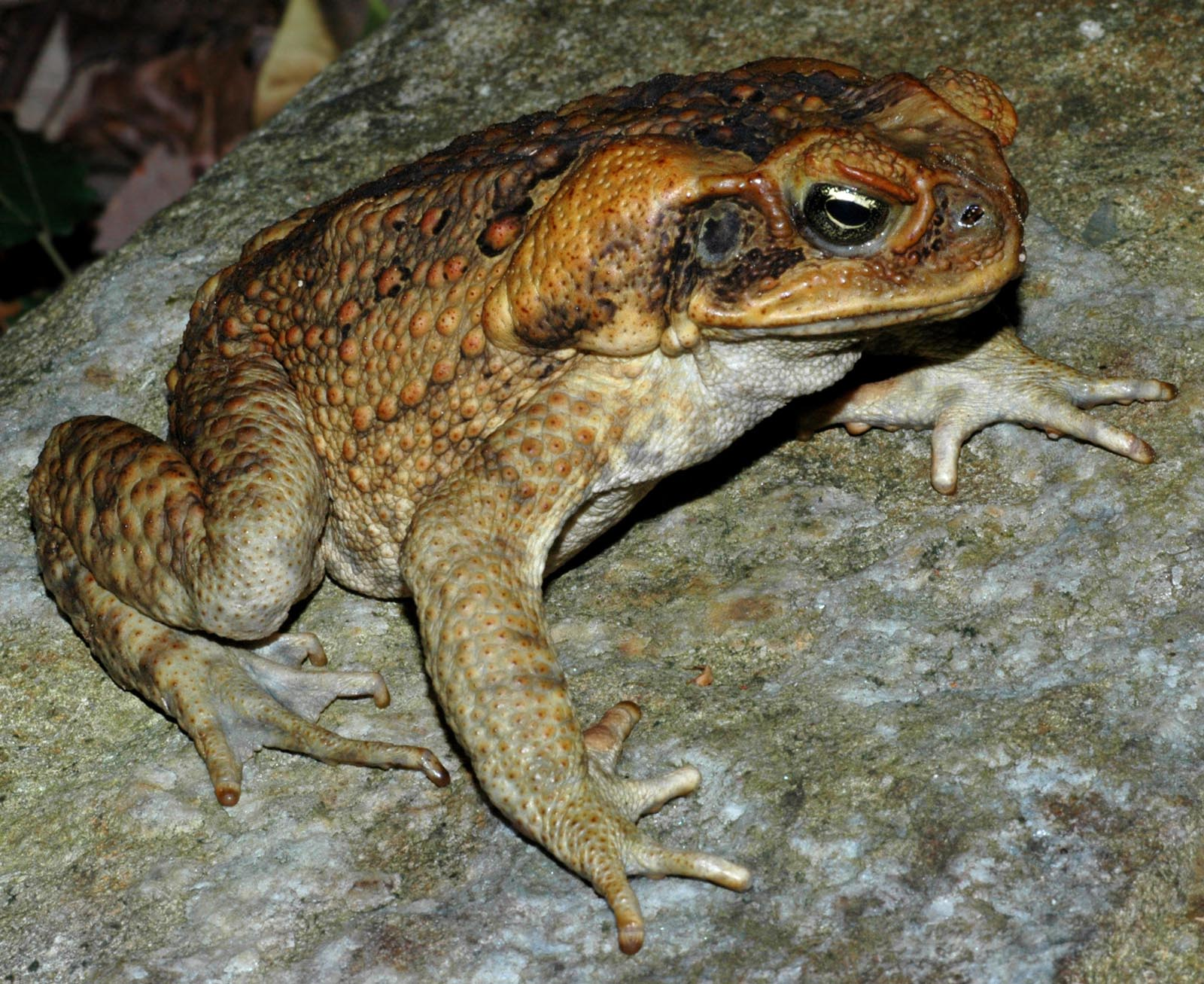
Tree frogs (Hylidae)
Species	Common name(s)	Notes	Image
Scinax x-signatus	Venezuela snouted treefrog	Least concern. Introduced; first recorded on Basse-Terre and Grande-Terre in 2003. Native to South America.
Tropical frogs (Leptodactylidae)
Species	Common name(s)	Notes	Image
Eleutherodactylus barlagnei	Matouba robber frog	Endangered. Endemic to the highlands of Basse-Terre.
Eleutherodactylus johnstonei	Lesser Antillean whistling frog, coqui antillano, Johnstone's whistling frog	Least concern. Introduced.
Eleutherodactylus martinicensis	Tink frog, Martinique robber frog	Near threatened. Regional endemic.
Eleutherodactylus pinchoni	Grand Cafe robber frog	Endangered. Endemic to the highlands of Basse-Terre.
True toads (Bufonidae)
Species	Common name(s)	Notes	Image
Bufo marinus	Cane toad, giant Neotropical toad, marine toad	Least concern. Introduced on main islands.

== Reptiles ==
Including marine turtles and introduced species, there are 21 reptile species reported in Guadeloupe. Four species are endemic.

=== Turtles (Testudines) ===
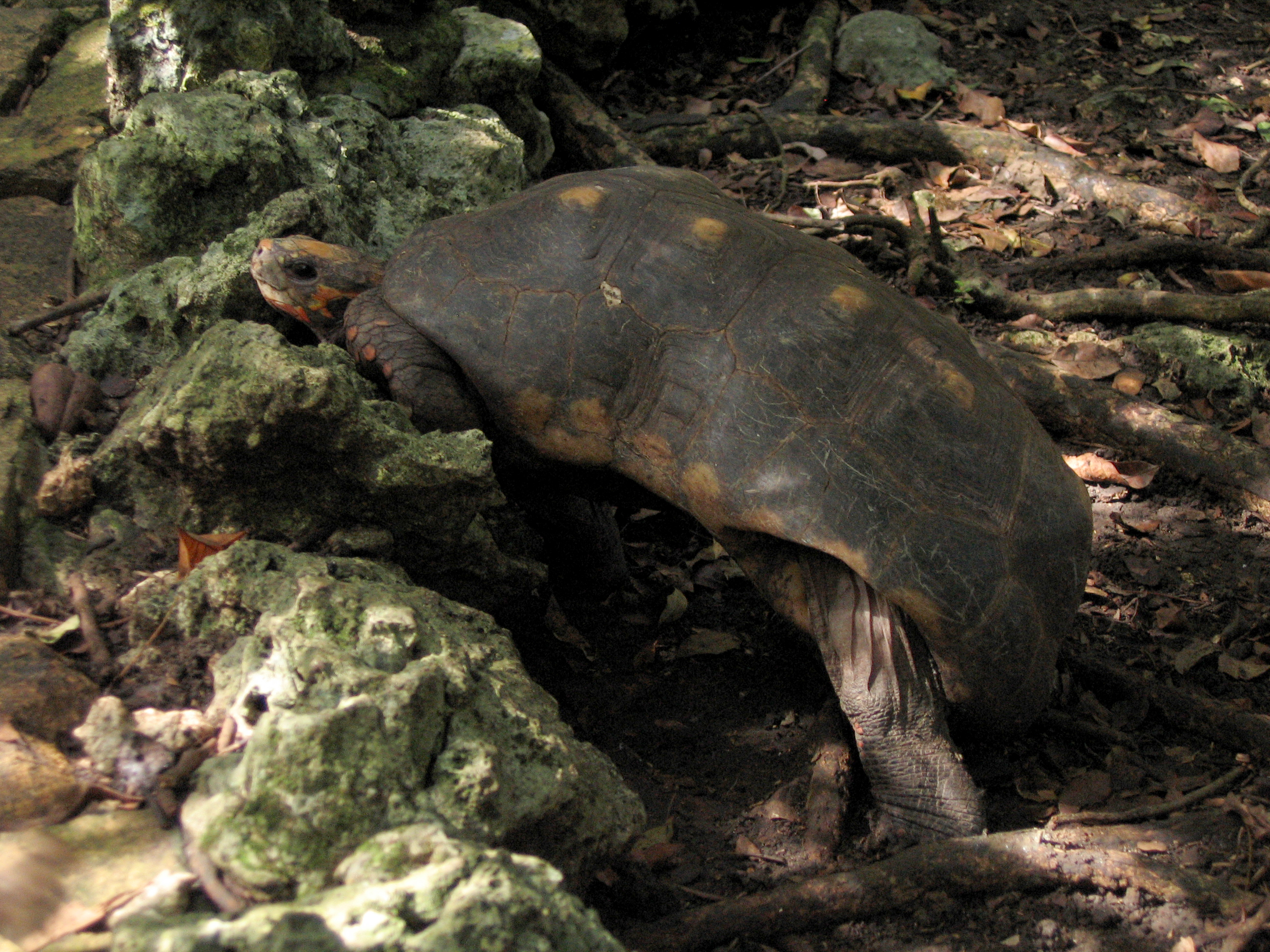
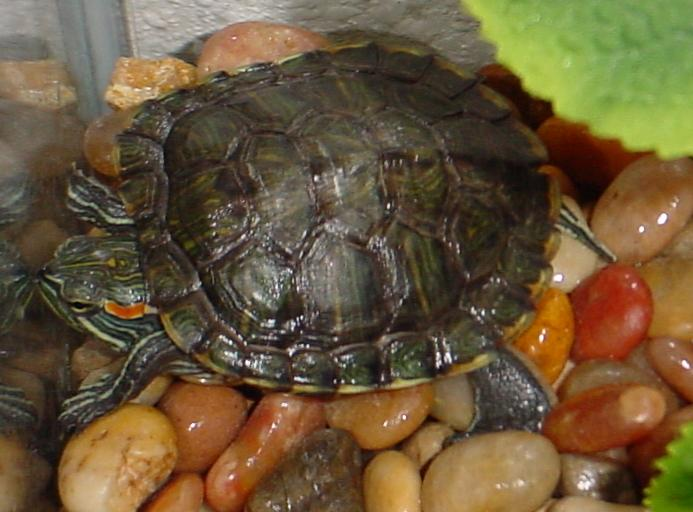
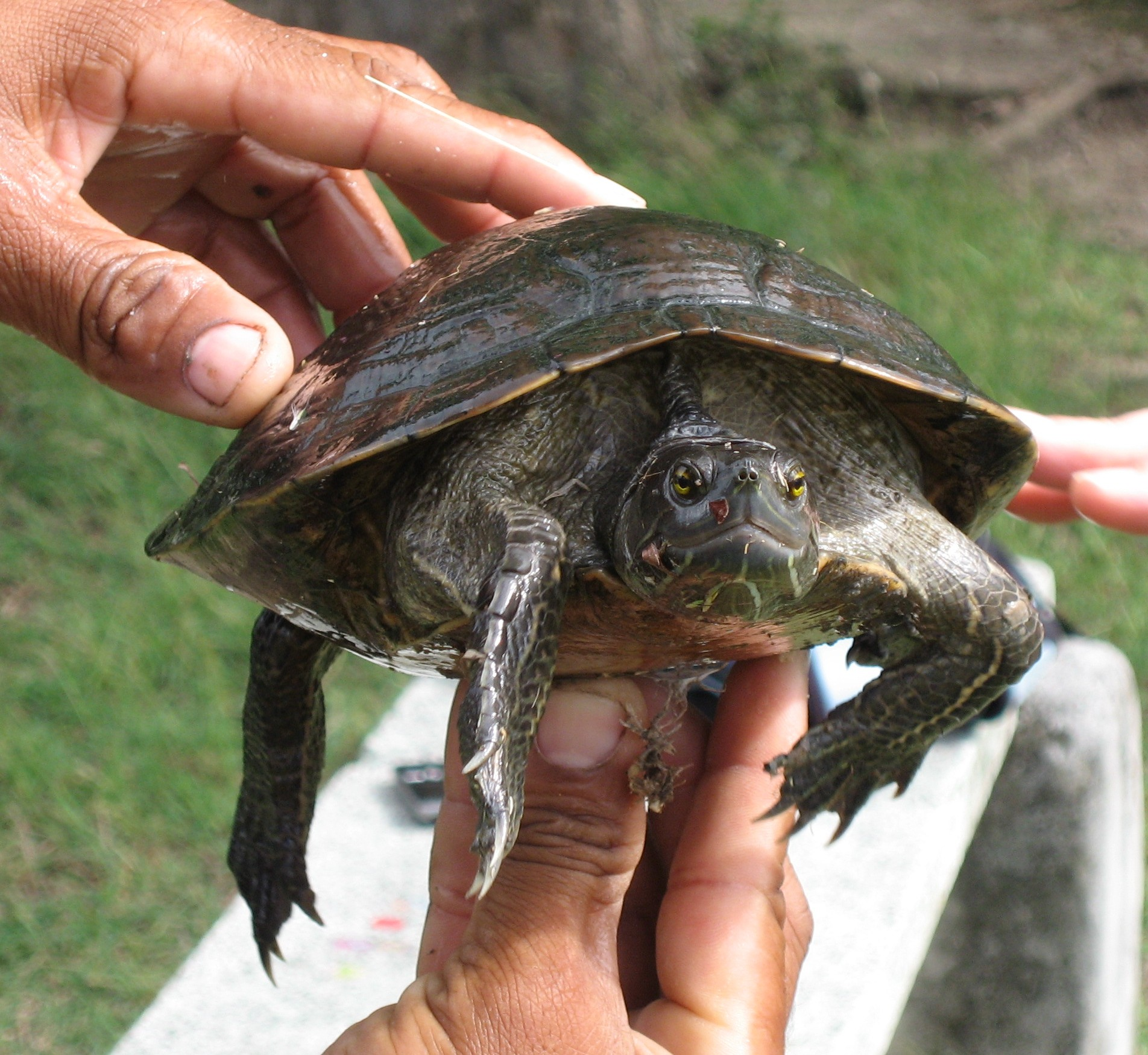
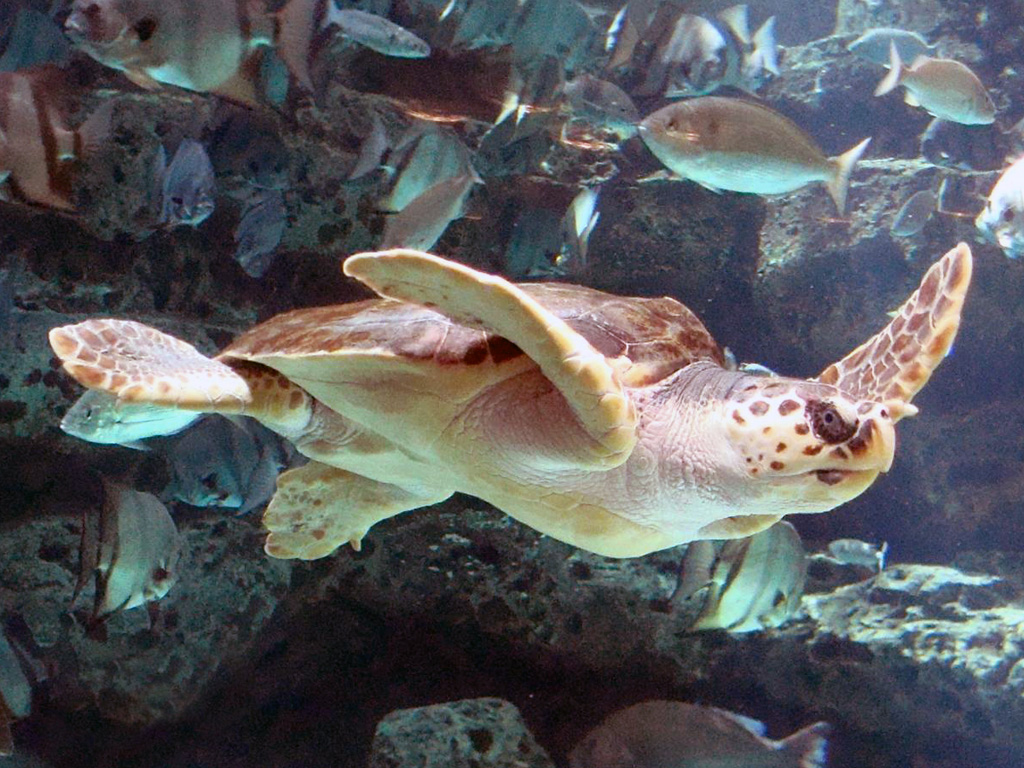
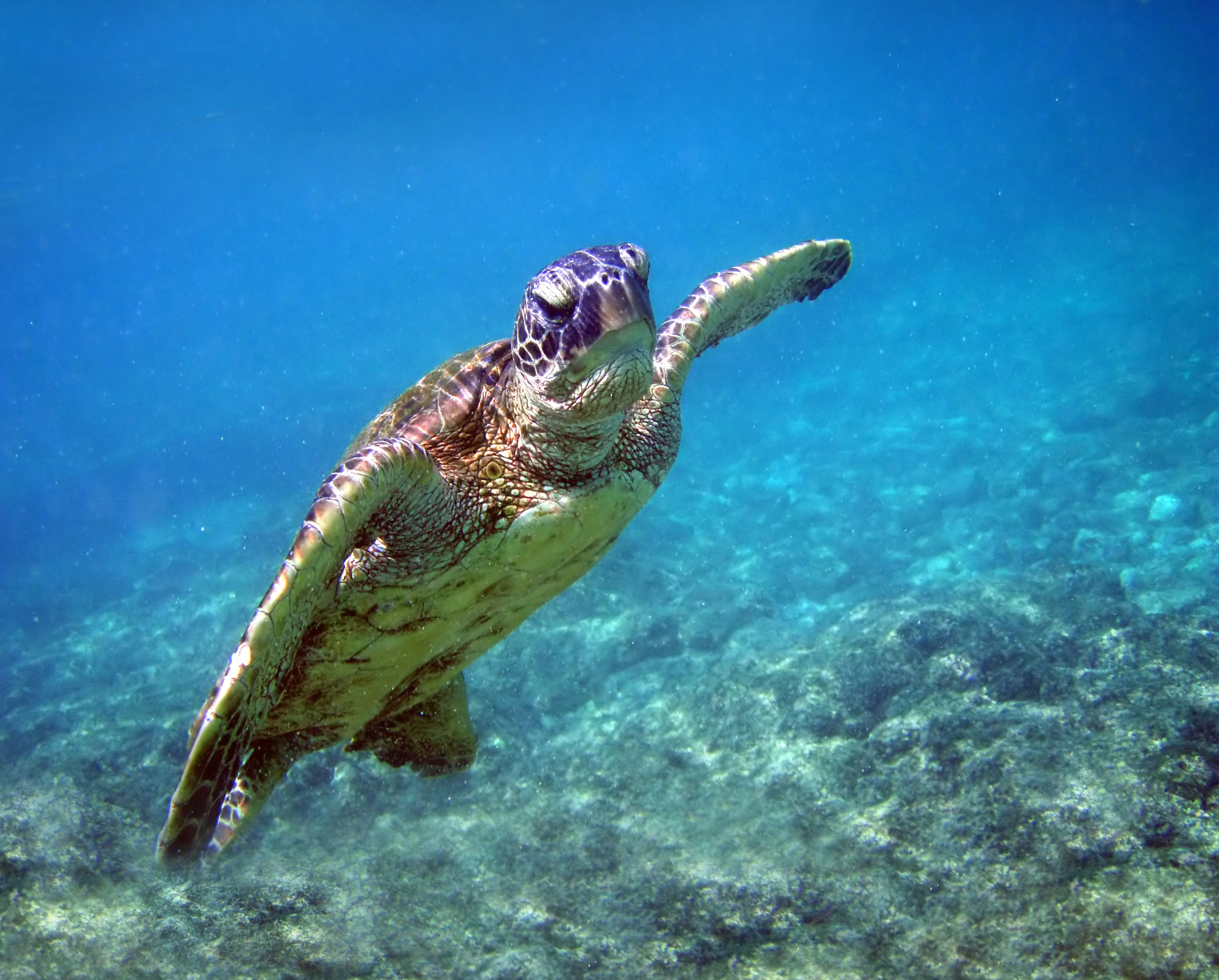
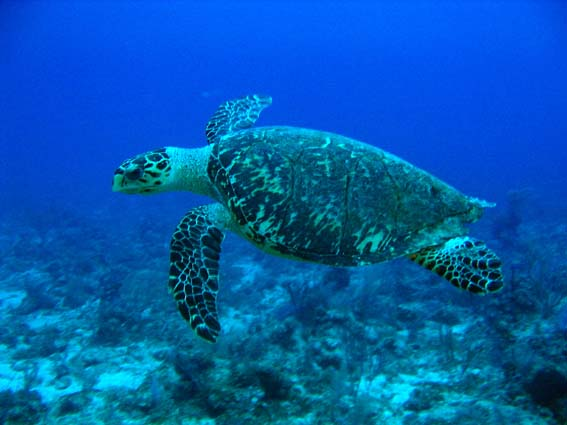
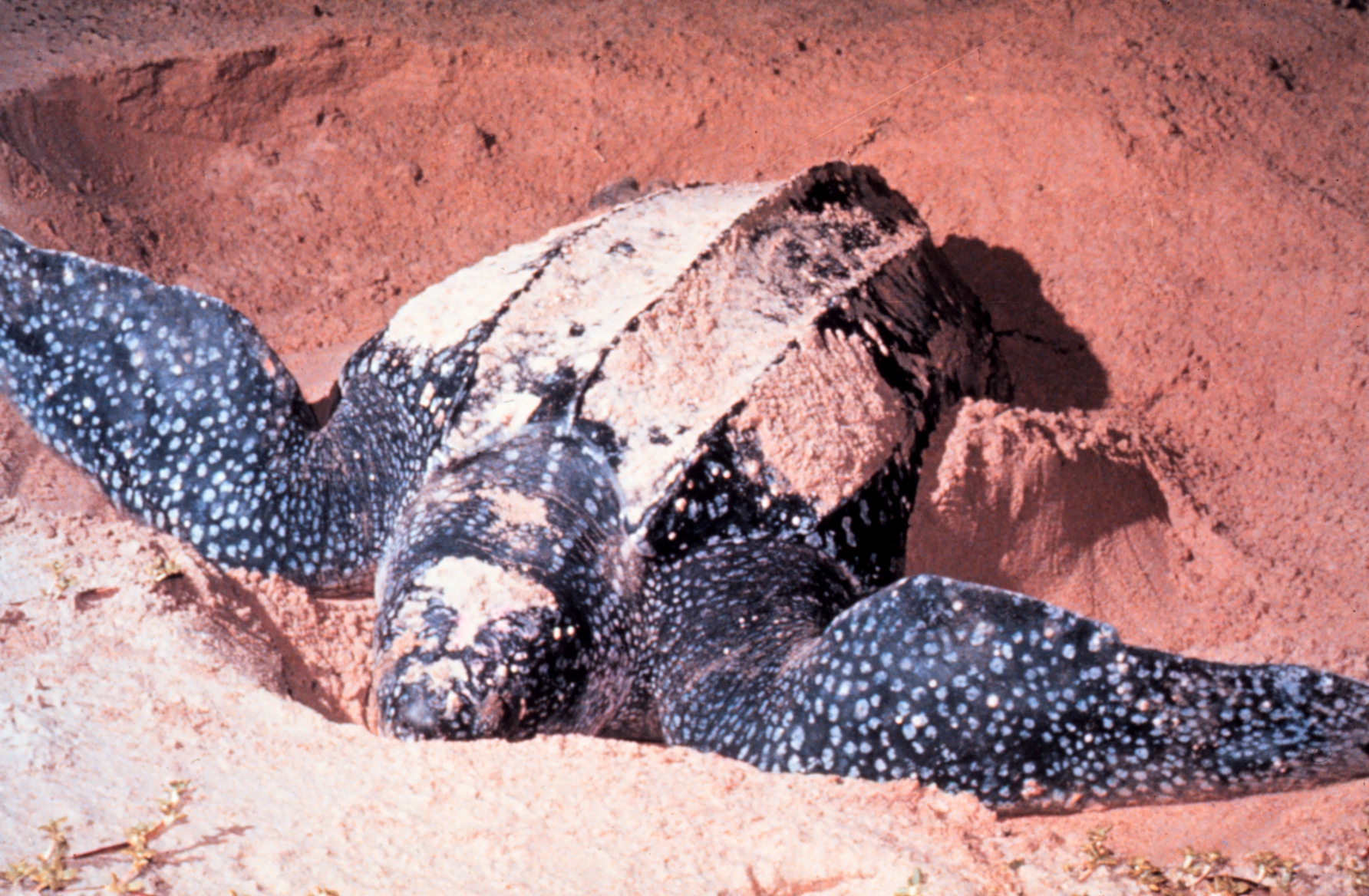
Box turtles and pond turtles (Emydidae)
Species	Common name(s)	Notes	Image
Geochelone carbonaria	Red-footed tortoise	Present on Îles des Saintes
Trachemys scripta	Pond slider	Near threatened. Introduced.
Trachemys stejnegeri	Central Antillean slider	Near threatened. Introduced.
African side-necked turtles (Pelomedusidae)
Species	Common name(s)	Notes	Image
Pelusios subniger	East African black mud turtle	Introduced.
Scaly sea turtles (Cheloniidae)
Species	Common name(s)	Notes	Image
Caretta caretta	Loggerhead turtle	Endangered.
Chelonia mydas	Green turtle	Endangered.
Eretmochelys imbricata	Hawksbill turtle	Critically endangered.
Leathery sea turtles (Dermochelyidae)
Species	Common name(s)	Notes	Image
Dermochelys coriacea	Leatherback turtle	Critically endangered.

=== Lizards and snakes (Squamata) ===
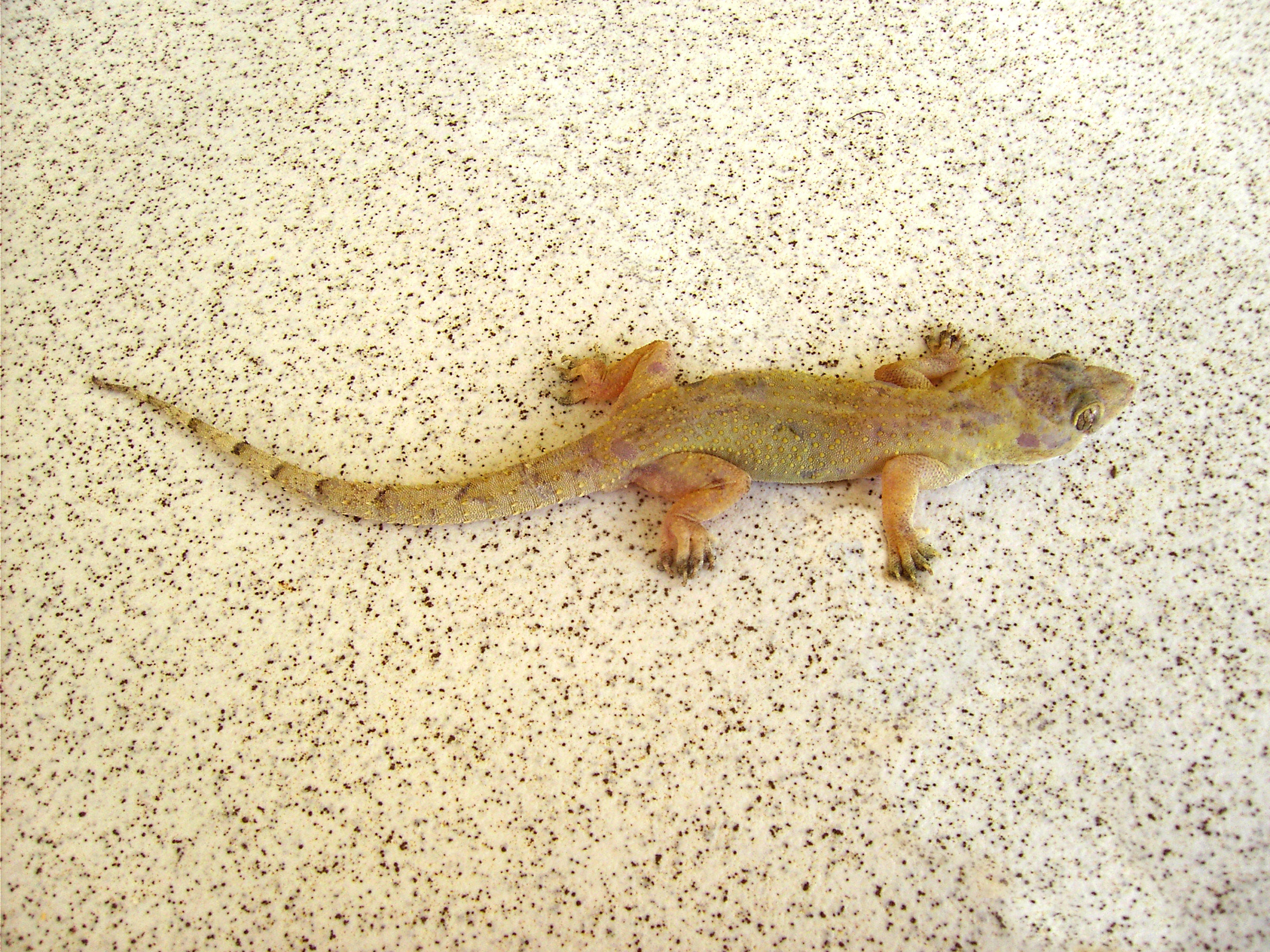
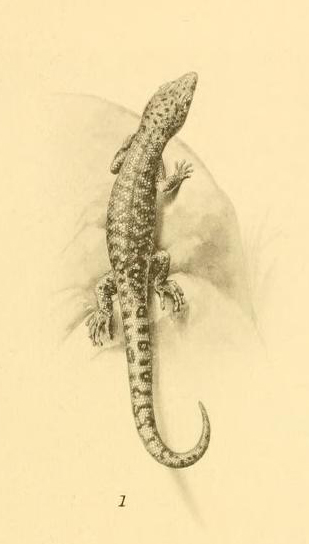
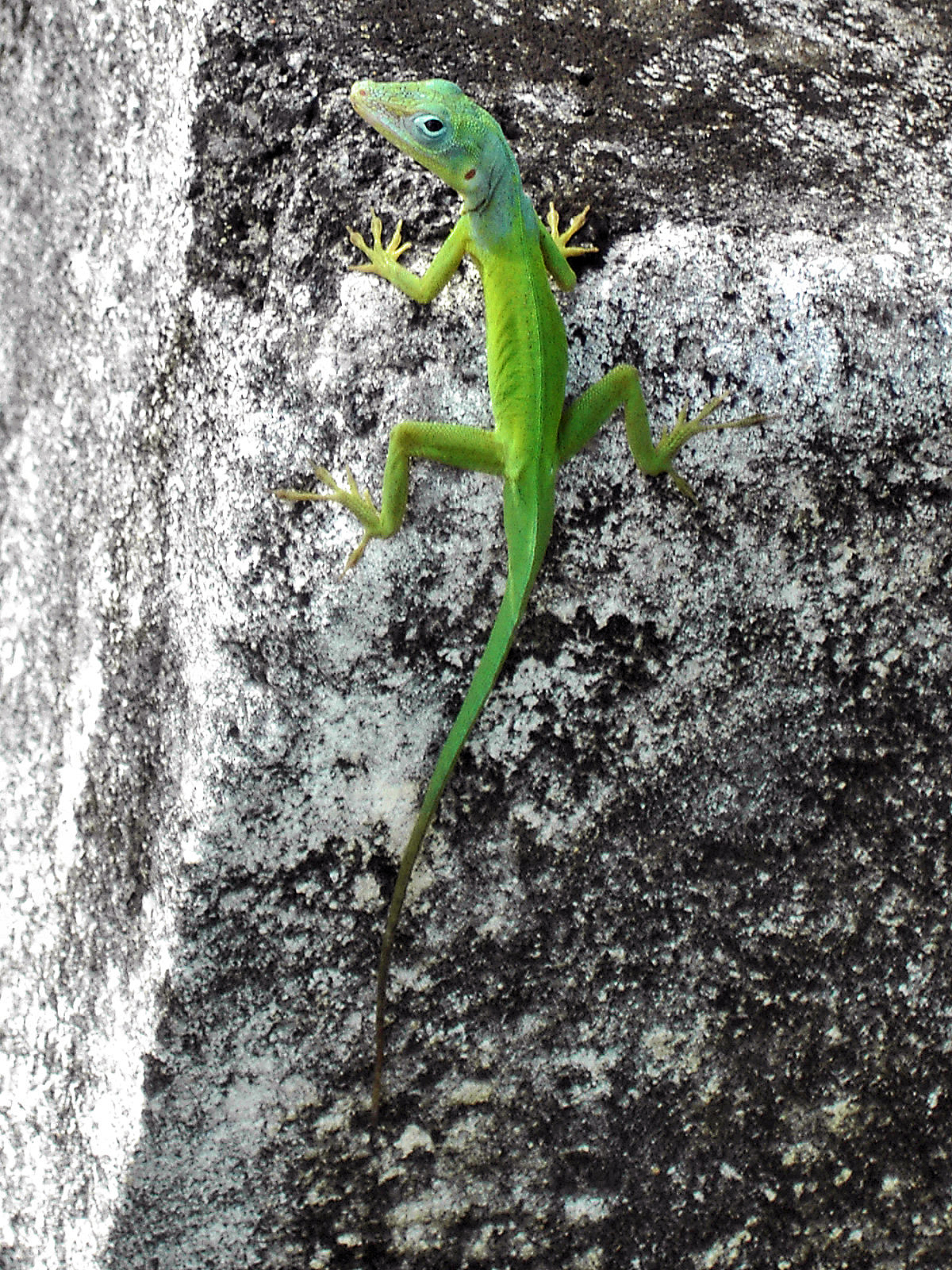
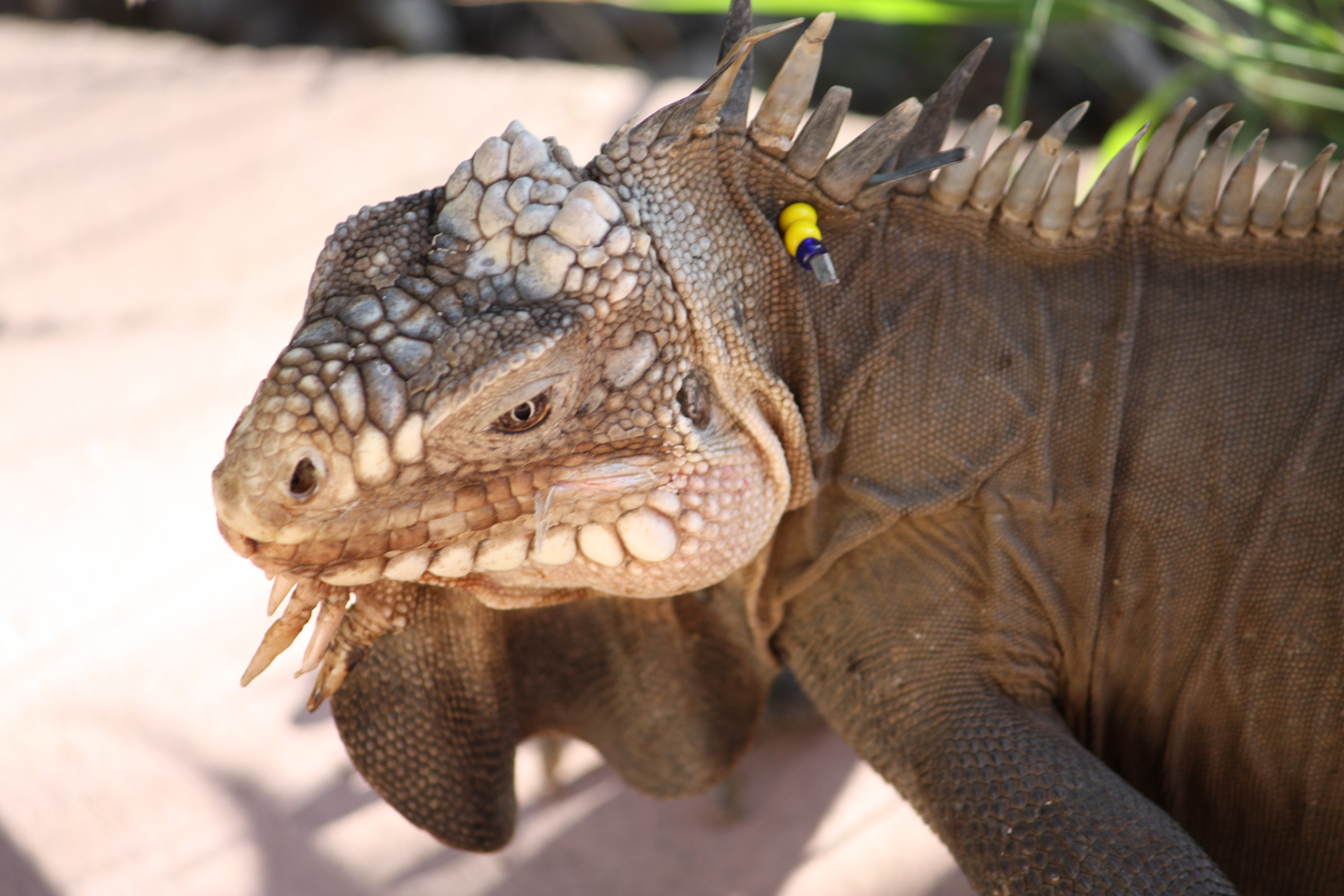
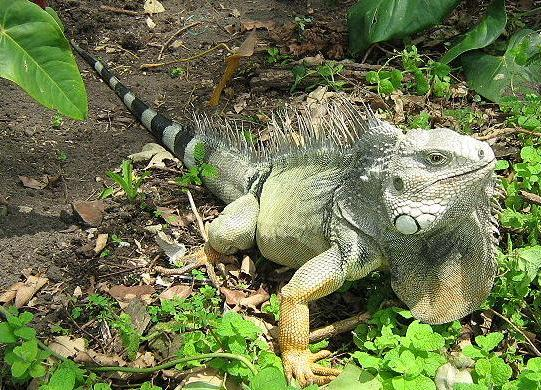
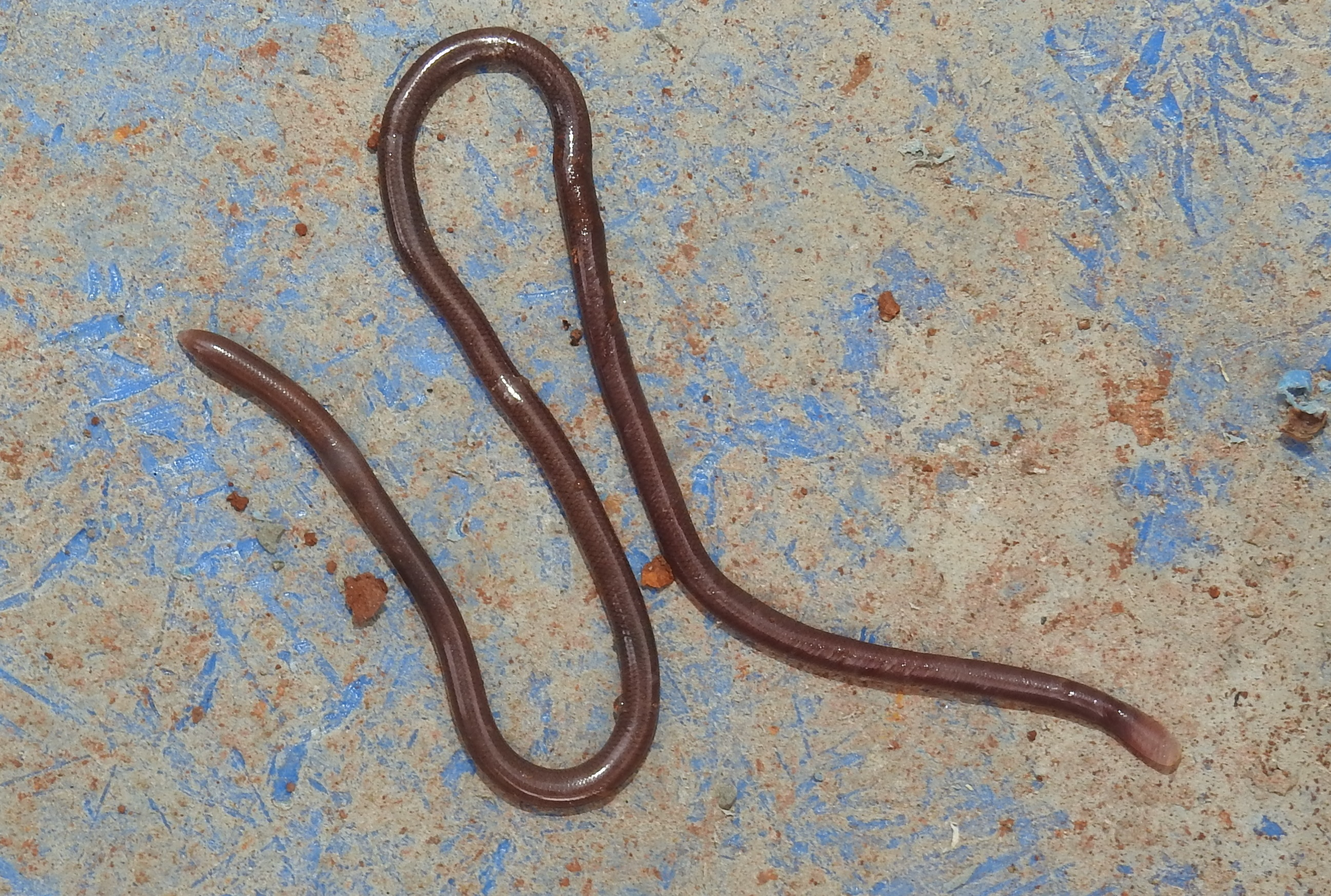
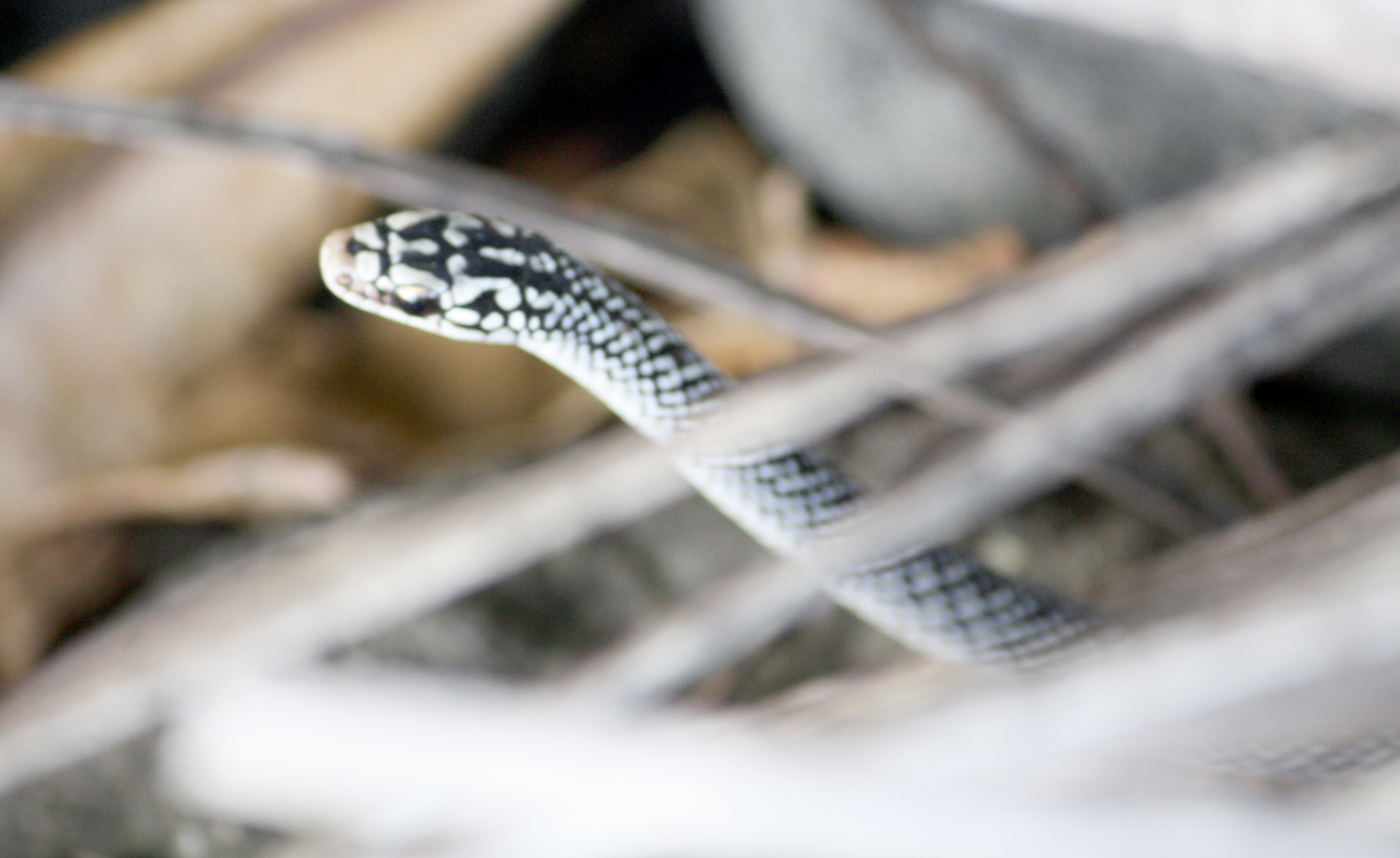
Geckos (Gekkonidae)
Species	Common name(s)	Notes	Image
Hemidactylus mabouia	House gecko	Introduced.
Sphaerodactylus fantasticus	Fantastic least gecko
Thecadactylus rapicauda	Turnip-tailed gecko
Iguanas and Anolids (Iguanidae)
Species	Common name(s)	Notes	Image
Anolis ferreus	Morne Constant anole	Endemic. Formerly described as a subspecies of A. marmoratus.
Anolis marmoratus	Leopard anole, Guadeloupean anole	Endemic.
Anolis terraealtae	Les Saintes anole	Endemic to Îles des Saintes. Highly abundant. Formerly described as a subspecies of A. marmoratus.
Iguana delicatissima	Lesser Antillean iguana, West Indian iguana	Critically Endangered. Regional endemic. Highly abundant on the Petite Terre Islands off the coast of Grand-Terre.
Iguana iguana	Green iguana, common iguana	Introduced.
Microteiids (Gymnophthalmidae)
Species	Common name(s)	Notes	Image
Gymnophthalmus pleii	Martinique spectacled tegu	Regional endemic.
Gymnophthalmus underwoodi	Underwood's spectacled tegu
Skinks (Scincidae)
Species	Common name(s)	Notes	Image
Capitellum mariagalantae	Marie-Galante skink	Critically endangered, possibly extinct. Endemic to Marie-Galante.
Mabuya cochonae		Endemic to Îlet à Cochons. Possibly extinct.
Mabuya desiradae	Désirade skink	Endemic to La Désirade.
Mabuya grandisterrae	Grande-Terre skink	Endemic to Grande-Terre. Possibly extinct.
Mabuya guadeloupae	Guadeloupe skink	Endemic to Basse-Terre. Possibly extinct.
Mabuya parviterrae	Petite Terre skink	Endemic to Petite Terre.
Worm snakes (Typhlopidae)
Species	Common name(s)	Notes	Image
Antillotyphlops guadeloupensis	Guadeloupe blind snake	Endemic. Alternately described as endemic subspecies of Typhlops dominicanus, with sister subspecies present on Dominica.
Indotyphlops braminus	Brahminy blind snake	Introduced on La Désirade.
Colubrids (Colubridae)
Species	Common name(s)	Notes	Image
Alsophis antillensis	Guadeloupe racer, Antilles racer, leeward racer	Critically endangered. Endemic to Grande-Terre and (formerly) Marie-Galante. On the verge of extinction and wild populations may no longer be viable, necessitating the urgent capture of the last wild individuals for a captive-breeding program.
Alsophis danforthi	Terre-de-Bas racer	Endangered. Endemic to Terre-de-Bas.
Alsophis sanctonum	Terre-de-Haut racer	Endangered. Endemic to Terre-de-Haut.
Erythrolamprus juliae	Julia's ground snake, grove snake	Near threatened. Subspecies L. j. copeae is endemic to numerous Guadeloupean islands; subspecies L. j. mariae is found only on Marie-Galante.

== Disputed or unconfirmed species ==
Species	Common name(s)	Notes	Image
Leptotyphlops bilineata	Two-lined blind snake	Record considered questionable.

== Species by island ==
=== Amphibians ===
Family	Species	Basse-Terre	Grande-Terre	Îles des Saintes	La Désirade	Marie-Galante
Hylidae	Scinax x-signatus	X	X			
Leptodactylidae	Eleutherodactylus barlagnei	X				
Leptodactylidae	Eleutherodactylus johnstonei	X	X	X	X	X
Leptodactylidae	Eleutherodactylus martinicensis	X	X	X	X	X
Leptodactylidae	Eleutherodactylus pinchoni	X				
Bufonidae	Bufo marinus	X	X			

=== Reptiles ===
Family	Species	Basse-Terre	Grande-Terre	Îles des Saintes	La Désirade	Marie-Galante
Emydidae	Trachemys scripta	X	X			X
Emydidae	Trachemys stejnegeri	X	X	X		X
Pelomedusidae	Pelusios subniger	X	X	?		
Cheloniidae	Caretta caretta	X	X	X	X	X
Cheloniidae	Chelonia mydas	X	X	X	X	X
Cheloniidae	Eretmochelys imbricata	X	X	X	X	X
Dermochelyidae	Dermochelys coriacea	X	X	X	X	X
Gekkonidae	Hemidactylus mabouia	X	X	X	X	X
Gekkonidae	Sphaerodactylus fantasticus	X	X	X	X	X
Gekkonidae	Thecadactylus rapicauda	X	X	X	X	?
Iguanidae	Anolis ferreus					X
Iguanidae	Anolis marmoratus	X	X		X	
Iguanidae	Anolis terraealtae			X		
Iguanidae	Iguana delicatissima	X	X	X	X	
Iguanidae	Iguana iguana	X	X	X		X
Gymnophthalmidae	Gymnophthalmus pleii	?	?	?	?	?
Gymnophthalmidae	Gymnophthalmus underwoodi	X	X	?	X	X
Scincidae	Capitellum mariagalantae					X
Scincidae	Mabuya cochonae	X				
Scincidae	Mabuya desiradae				X	
Scincidae	Mabuya grandisterrae		X			
Scincidae	Mabuya guadeloupae	X				
Scincidae	Mabuya parviterrae			X		
Typhlopidae	Antillotyphlops guadeloupensis	X	X	?	?	?
Typhlopidae	Indotyphlops braminus	?	?	?	X	?
Colubridae	Alsophis antillensis	X	X			X
Colubridae	Alsophis danforthi			X		
Colubridae	Alsophis sanctonum			X		
Colubridae	Erythrolamprus juliae	X	X	?	?	?
