= Eleutherodactylus barlagnei =

Conservation status
- Endangered (IUCN 3.1)

Scientific classification
- Kingdom: Animalia
- Phylum: Chordata
- Class: Amphibia
- Order: Anura
- Family: Eleutherodactylidae
- Genus: Eleutherodactylus
- Subgenus: Eleutherodactylus
- Species: E. barlagnei

Binomial name
- Eleutherodactylus barlagnei Lynch, 1965

Species of frog

Eleutherodactylus barlagnei, known commonly as the Matouba robber frog or Guadeloupe stream frog, is a species of frog in the family Eleutherodactylidae. It is endemic to Basse-Terre Island, Guadeloupe.

== Taxonomy ==
The first description of the species was published by John D. Lynch in 1965. The specific name is derived from that of Patrice Barlagne, who together with James Lazell collected the holotype of the species alongside four paratypes in August 1961, with the type locality being Matouba, in the north of Basse-Terre Island in Guadeloupe, at an elevation of about 700 m (2,300 ft). Barlagne and Lazell had collected the paratypes alongside another series of specimens which, despite a nearly identical external appearance, they were able to distinguish from the paratypes by their call and the habit with which they used it; according to Lynch, the other species was very likely to be Eleutherodactylus martinicensis. Barlagne was chosen as the namesake over Lazell because he had collected the majority of the examined specimens and had helped the latter collect specimens on La Grande Soufrière.

== Description ==
The average snout–vent lengths for E. barlagnei is roughly 21 mm (0.83 in) for males and roughly 25 mm (0.98 in) for females. There is low individual variance in colouration. The back is rusty brown to black, with a pair of chevrons that have tan mottling or stippling. The underside of the frogs head is dark grey with white spots, and the belly is similarly dark grey but is occasionally a lighter grey towards the centre.

The females lay their eggs on vegetation and in rock crevices.

== Distribution and habitat ==
E. barlagnei is endemic to a 465 km^{2} (180 sq mi) region Basse-Terre Island, Guadeloupe, where it is sympatric with Eleutherodactylus pinchoni.

E. barlagnei is aquatic, living in both large and small streams, with a preference for reasonably fast-moving waters with boulders. It usually occurs in rainforest, but can also be found in grassy savanna and, if trees are present, in habitats disturbed by humans. It lives at elevations ranging from sea level to 1,400 m (4,600 ft).

E. barlagnei are moderately common in suitable habitat, but is threatened by the limited extent and continuing decline of quality of such habitats. The species is also threatened by pollution from pesticides used in banana plantations and domestically, be introduced predators such as rats, cats and mongooses, the introduced frog Eleutherodactylus johnstonei, and chytridiomycosis. The 2020 IUCN assessment of the species listed it as endangered on the Red List.

== Sources ==
- Schwartz, Albert (1967). "Frogs of the genus Eleutherodactylus in the Lesser Antilles" (PDF). Studies on the Fauna of Curaçao and other Caribbean Islands. 24 (1): 1–64 – via Naturalis.
