= Robert Pinchon =

Robert Pinchon may refer to:

- Robert Pinchon (naturalist) (1913–1980), priest, naturalist and archaeologist
- Robert Antoine Pinchon (1886–1943), French landscape painter
