= Mabuya parviterrae =

Scientific classification
- Kingdom: Animalia
- Phylum: Chordata
- Class: Reptilia
- Order: Squamata
- Family: Scincidae
- Genus: Mabuya
- Species: M. parviterrae

Binomial name
- Mabuya parviterrae Hedges, Lorvelec, Barré, Berchel, Combot, Vidal & Pavis, 2016

Species of lizard

Mabuya parviterrae, also known as the Petite Terre skink, is a species of lizard in the subfamily Lygosominae of the family Scincidae. It grows to snout–vent lengths of 101 mm (4.0 in) in males and 103 mm (4.1 in) in females. It is endemic to the island of Terre-de-Bas in the Îles de la Petite Terre, a small archipelago in Guadeloupe. It is largely restricted to a single rock wall on the island measuring around 460 m (1,500 ft) long, and may have the smallest range of any vertebrate. It is recommended that it be classified as being critically endangered.

== Taxonomy ==
Prior to the description of the Petite Terre skink, the taxonomic status of the population of Mabuya skinks from Terre de Bas was unclear; they were variously thought to represent Mabuya guadeloupae and M. desiradae, species found on the larger islands of Basse-Terre and La Désirade, respectively. Mabuya parviterrae was formally described in 2016 based on an adult female specimen collected from central Terre-de-Bas in the Îles de la Petite Terre archipelago of Guadeloupe. The specific epithet is derived from the Latin words meaning "small land" and allude to Îles de la Petite Terre that the skink is native to. It has the English common name Petite Terre skink and the French common name Scinque de la Petite Terre. It is part of the M. guadeloupae species group within the genus Mabuya.

The validity of the Mabuya species endemic to Guadeloupe's islands is disputed, a matter complicated by the fact that most taxa in this complex have been driven to apparent extinction, leading to very few specimens being available for sufficiently rigorous molecular analyses. Miralles and colleagues proposed in 2017 that all Guadeloupean populations be lumped into M. desiradae. This arrangement was subsequently rejected by Hedges and colleagues in 2019, who argued that they had drawn incorrect conclusions from their molecular analyses, mislabelled a specimen of M. parviterrae as being from La Désirade, and failed to consider morphological characteristics that had previously been shown to be important in Mabuya species.

== Description ==
Petite Terre skinks grow to snout–vent lengths of 101 mm (4.0 in) in males and 103 mm (4.1 in) in females. The back is brown, maculated with numerous darker flecks, and slightly darker limbs. The sides have a dark brown band from the eyes to the back limbs, changing from a solid band to spots towards the middle and becoming more indistinct towards the posterior. There are two grey bands along the sides of the back. The underside is largely light beige and unmarked.

== Distribution and conservation ==
The Petite Terre skink is endemic to the island of Terre-de-Bas in the Îles de la Petite Terre, a small archipelago that is part of the French overseas department of Guadeloupe in the Caribbean. The species was formerly more widespread, but now is mainly restricted to a single rock wall, around 460 m (1,500 ft) n length, found near the centre of the island. The island's native vegetation was mostly deforested centuries back, and the now-existing scrubland provides little food or cover for skinks. Besides the primary wall, where the population is estimated to number around 50 skinks, it is occasionally seen on other walls on the island. Its preference for walls may be due to the fact that they provide some ability to escape invasive black rats.

The scientists describing the species recommended that it be classified as being critically endangered due to its exceedingly small distribution, which may be the smallest range of any vertebrate, degraded habitat, and ongoing predation from black rats.
