= Inagua slider =

Conservation status
- Near Threatened (IUCN 2.3)

Scientific classification
- Kingdom: Animalia
- Phylum: Chordata
- Class: Reptilia
- Order: Testudines
- Suborder: Cryptodira
- Family: Emydidae
- Genus: Trachemys
- Species: T. stejnegeri
- Subspecies: T. s. malonei

Trinomial name
- Trachemys stejnegeri malonei (Barbour & Carr, 1938)

Subspecies of turtle

The Inagua slider (Trachemys stejnegeri malonei) is a subspecies of the Central Antillean slider. It is endemic to the island of Great Inagua, in the Bahamas.

== Bibliography ==
- Rhodin, Anders G.J.; van Dijk, Peter Paul; Inverson, John B.; Shaffer, H. Bradley (2010-12-14). "Turtles of the World 2010 Update: Annotated Checklist of Taxonomy, Synonymy, Distribution and Conservation Status" (PDF). Archived from the original (PDF) on 2011-07-17.
