= Mabuya montserratae =

Conservation status
- Critically endangered, possibly extinct (IUCN 3.1)

Scientific classification
- Kingdom: Animalia
- Phylum: Chordata
- Class: Reptilia
- Order: Squamata
- Family: Scincidae
- Genus: Mabuya
- Species: M. montserratae

Binomial name
- Mabuya montserratae Hedges & Conn, 2012

Species of lizard

Mabuya montserratae, the Montserrat skink, is a species of lizard belonging to the family Scincidae, the skinks. This species is endemic to Montserrat in the Lesser Antilles, although it is now considered to be possibly extinct.

== Taxonomy ==
Mabuya montserratae was first formally described in 2012 by the American herpetologists S. Blair Hedges and Caitlin E. Conn, with its type locality given as between Killecrankie Mydram, Waterworks Estate and Molyneux Village, Montserrat, the holotype being collected on 6 August 1970. This species is classified in the genus Mabuya which is within the subfamily Mabuyinae of the skink family Scincidae.

== Distribution and habitat ==
Mabuya montserratae is endemic to the island of Montserrat in the Lesser Antilles, but is known from only eight specimens which were collected at just two locations on the island, the type locality and Woodlands in the Central Hills of the island. The Montserrat skink is apparently restricted to the more humid forests of centre of the island.

== Possible extinction ==
Mabuya montserratae was probably last recorded in 1984 when a skink was photographed on Montserrat. The type locality is near the island's de jure capital, the abandoned town of Plymouth, an area devastated by the eruption of the Soufrière Hills in 1995. The other known location was in the Centre Hills within the exclusion zone and in an area which was not directly affected by the eruptions. However, surveys of the island since the eruptions have found all of the other reptile species recorded from the island before the eruption except for the Montserrat skink. The International Union for Conservation of Nature classifies this species as critically endangered, possibly extinct.
