= Mabuya hispaniolae =

Hispaniolan two-lined skink

Conservation status
- Critically endangered, possibly extinct (IUCN 3.1)

Scientific classification
- Kingdom: Animalia
- Phylum: Chordata
- Class: Reptilia
- Order: Squamata
- Family: Scincidae
- Genus: Mabuya
- Species: M. hispaniolae

Binomial name
- Mabuya hispaniolae Hedges & Conn, 2012

Species of lizard

Mabuya hispaniolae, the Hispaniolan two-lined skink, is a species of lizard in the subfamily Lygosominae of the family Scincidae. The species is endemic to the Dominican Republic on the island of Hispaniola.
