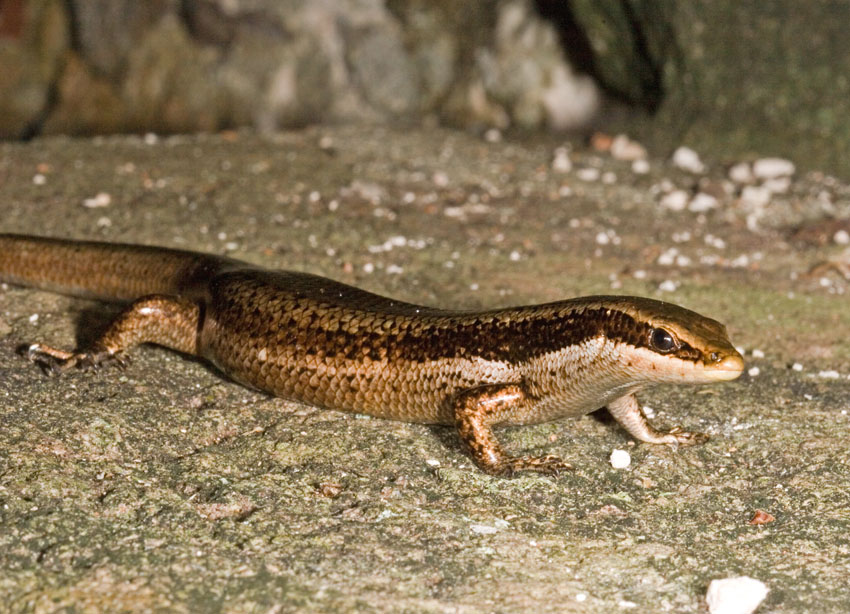
- Dominica skink Mabuya dominicana

Scientific classification
- Kingdom: Animalia
- Phylum: Chordata
- Class: Reptilia
- Order: Squamata
- Family: Scincidae
- Subfamily: Mabuyinae
- Genus: Mabuya; Fitzinger, 1826

Species
- See text

= Mabuya =

Genus of lizards

Mabuya is a genus of long-tailed skinks, lizards in the family Scincidae. The genus is restricted to species from various Caribbean islands. Out of 26 recognized species, six species are only found in Caribbean islands. Species in the genus Mabuya are primarily carnivorous, though many are omnivorous. The genus is viviparous, having a highly evolved placenta that resembles that of eutherian mammals. Formerly, many Old World species were placed here, as Mabuya was a kind of "wastebasket taxon". These Old World species are now placed in the genera Chioninia, Eutropis, and Trachylepis. Under the older classification, the New World species were referred to as "American mabuyas", and as of 2024 include the genera Alinea, Aspronema, Brasiliscincus, Capitellum, Copeoglossum, Maracaiba, Marisora, and Varzea.

Most species in this genus are feared to be possibly extinct due to introduced predators.

== Species ==
Listed alphabetically by specific name.

- Mabuya cochonae Hedges & Conn, 2012 – Cochons skink (possibly extinct)
- Mabuya desiradae Hedges & Conn, 2012 – Désirade skink
- Mabuya dominicana Garman, 1887 – Dominica skink
- Mabuya grandisterrae Hedges & Conn, 2012 – Grande-Terre skink (possibly extinct)
- Mabuya guadeloupae Hedges & Conn, 2012 – Guadeloupe skink (possibly extinct)
- Mabuya hispaniolae Hedges & Conn, 2012 – Hispaniolan two-lined skink (possibly extinct)
- Mabuya mabouya (Bonnaterre, 1789) – Greater Martinique skink (possibly extinct)
- Mabuya montserratae Hedges & Conn, 2012 – Montserrat skink (possibly extinct)
- Mabuya parviterrae Hedges, Lorvelec, Barré, Berchel, Combot, Vidal & Pavis, 2016 – Petite Terre skink

Nota bene: A binomial authority in parentheses indicates that the species was originally described in a genus other than Mabuya.

== Gallery ==
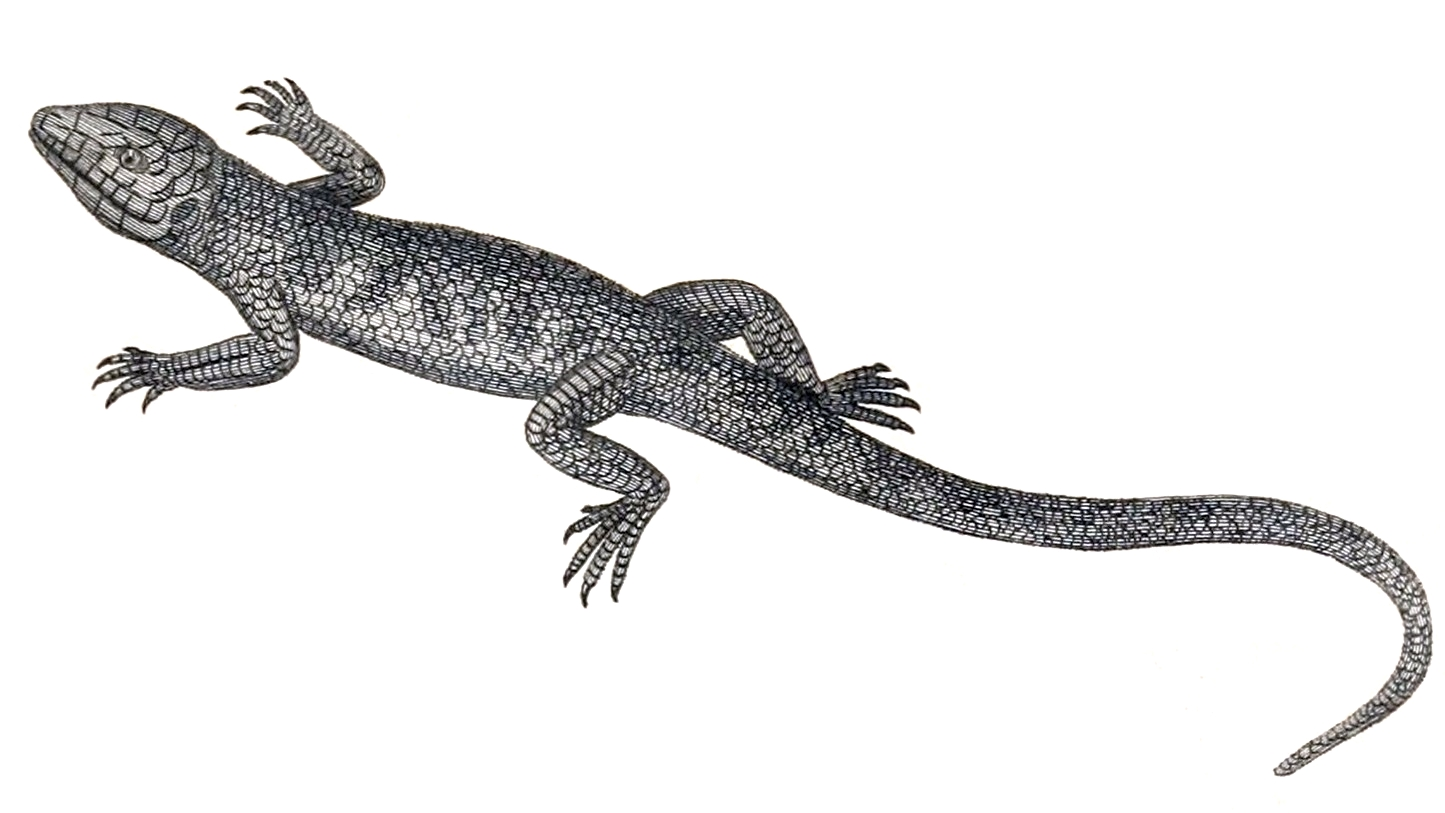
Mabuya mabouya

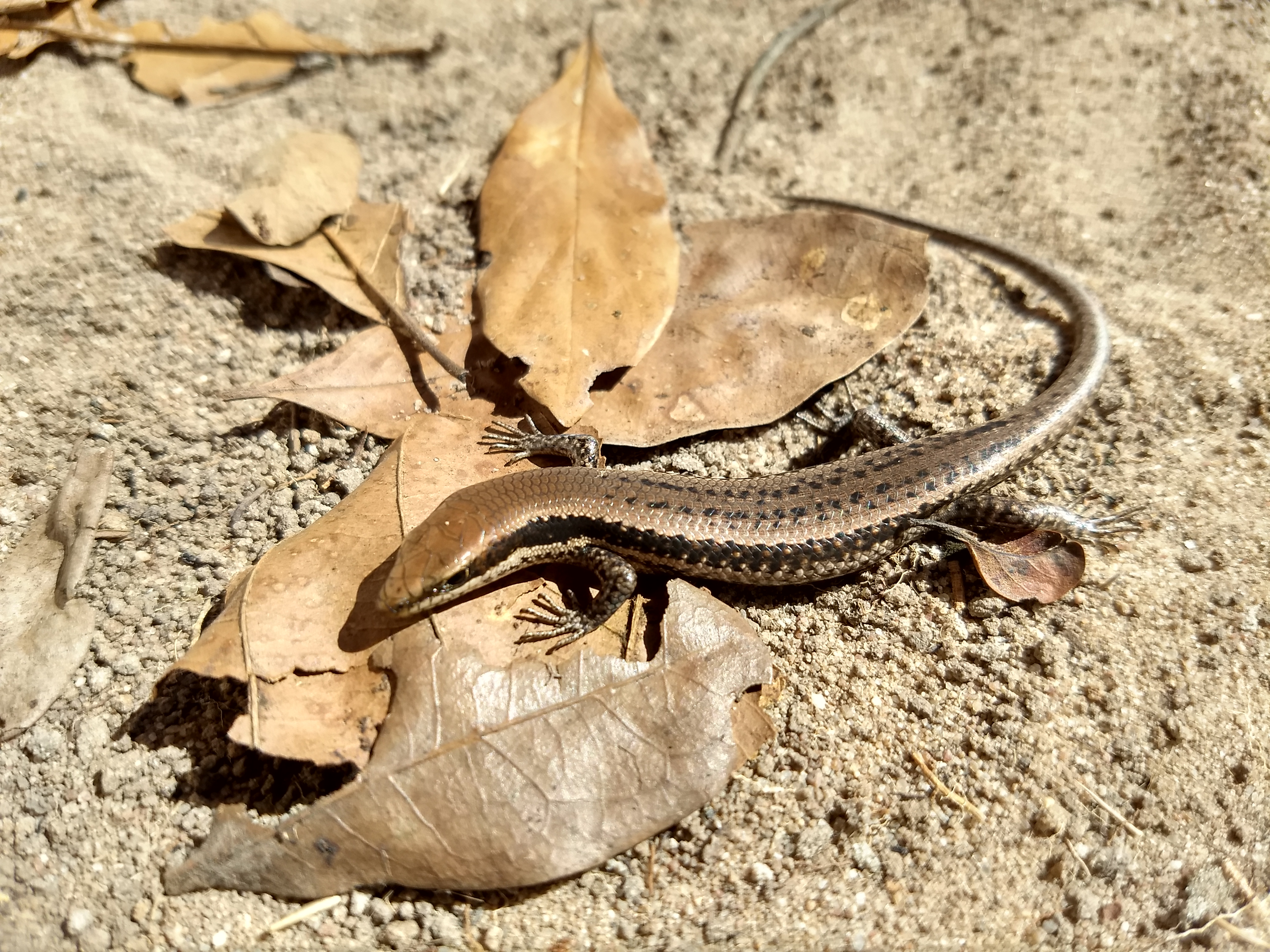
Mabuya frenata

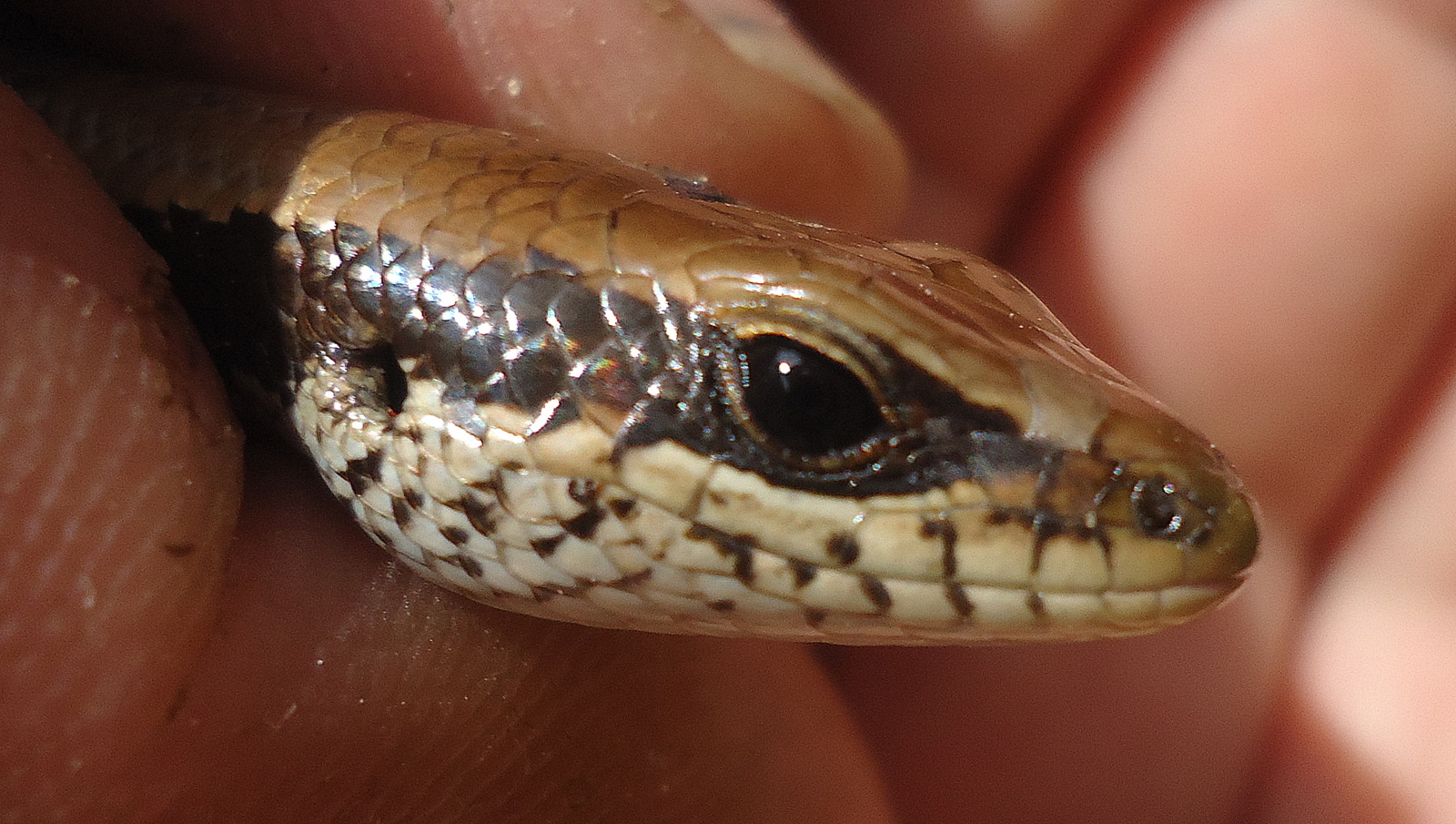
Unidentified mabuya head

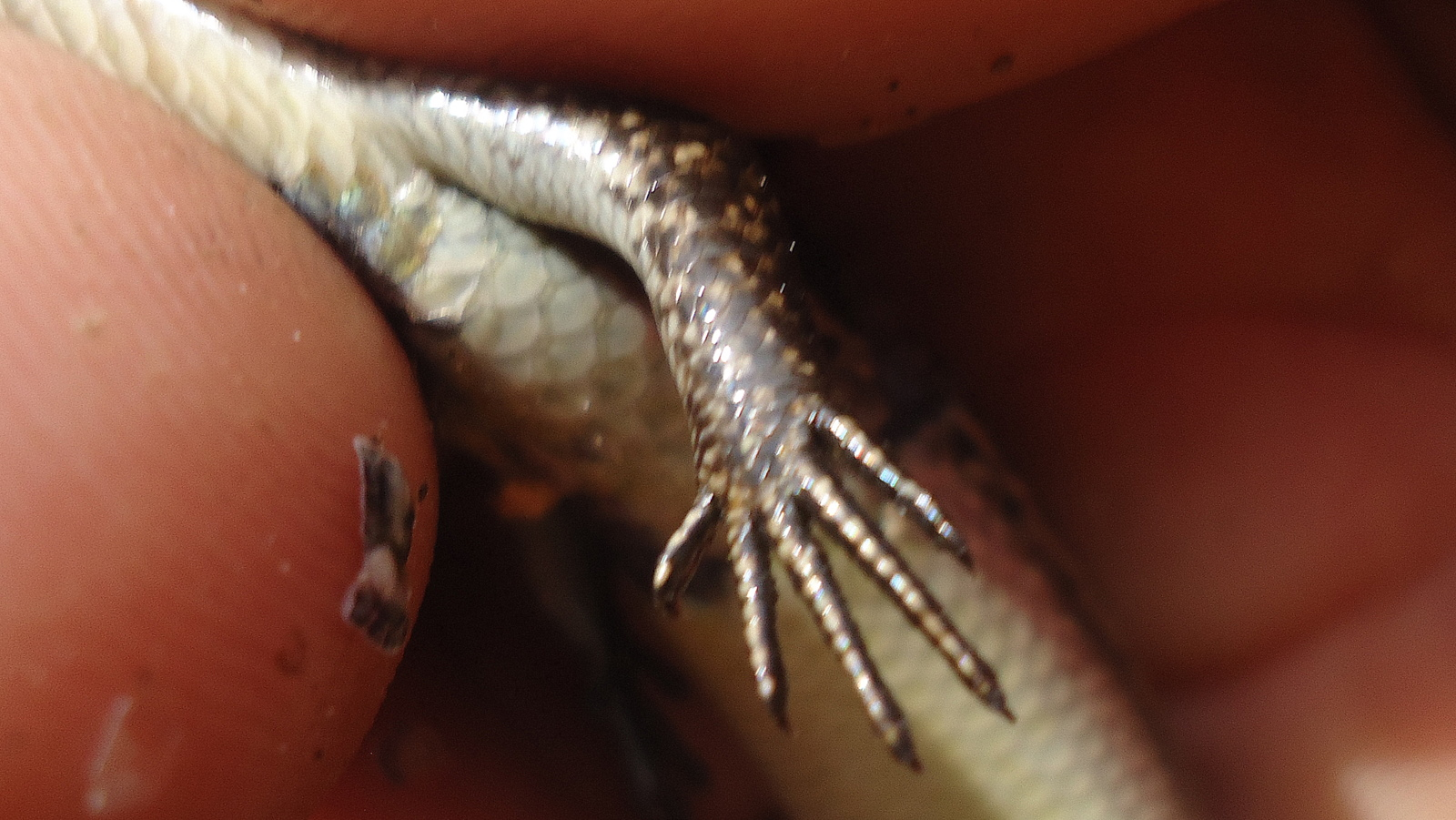
Unidentified mabuya claw
