= Robert Pinchon (naturalist) =

French priest and naturalist

Père Robert Pinchon (10 September 1913 – 16 April 1980) was a priest, naturalist and archaeologist who lived most of his life on Martinique.

== Life ==
He was born in Provin, Seine et Marne, in 1913. After his ordination to the Congregation of the Holy Spirit, he studied science at university, obtaining a doctorate. He was appointed professor at the diocesan college in Fort-de-France, Martinique. He was happy with an appointment where much scientific categorisation of fauna had yet to be done, which he expressed with the words "que ce soit pour toujours" ("may it be forever").

== Career ==
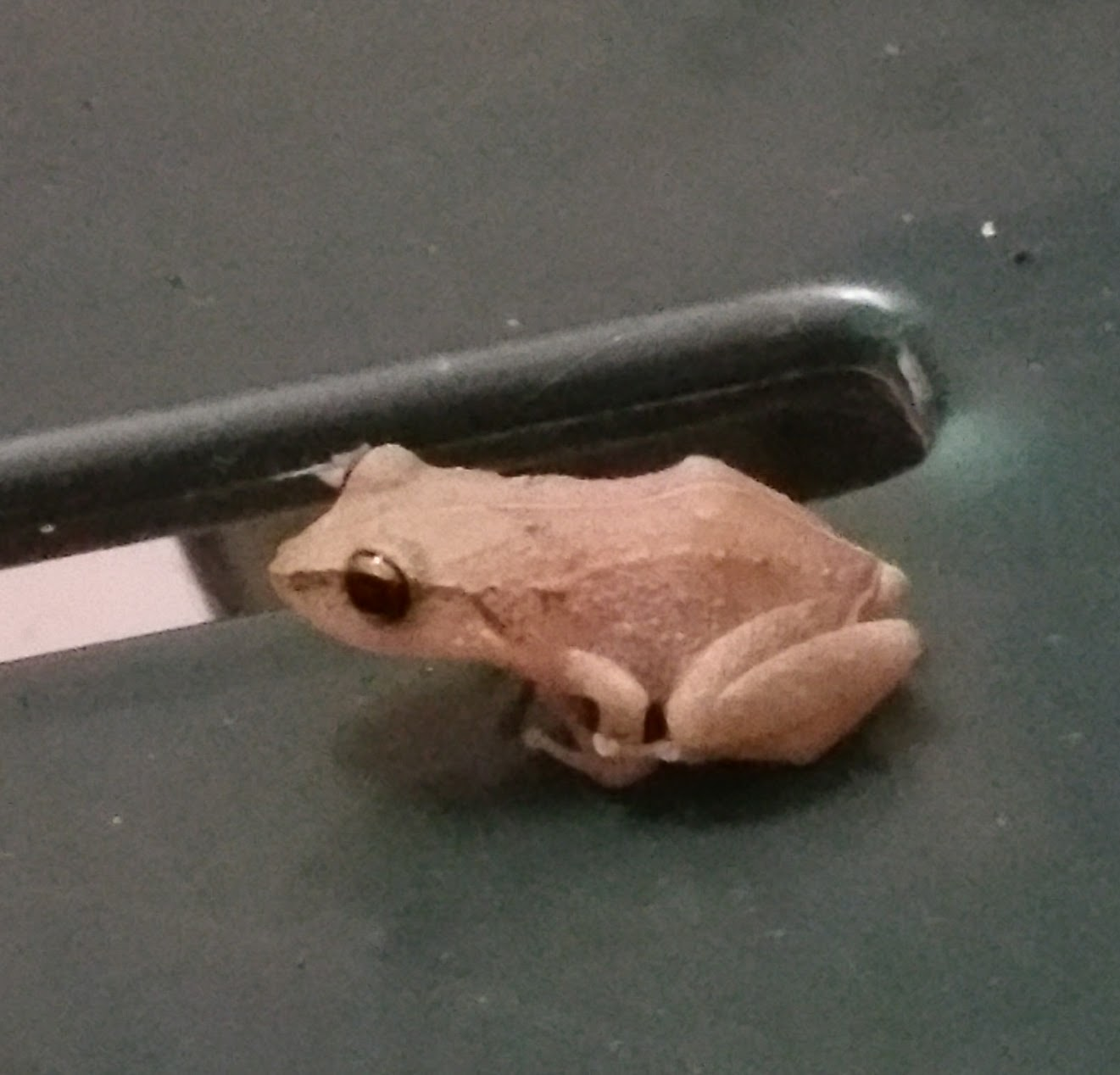
Eleutherodactylus pinchoni, known commonly as the Grand Cafe robber frog, is endemic to Guadeloupe.

Robert Pinchon arrived on Martinique in 1945, where he took up the post of professor of natural sciences at the College Seminary. He was an educator who opened up the natural world to young Martinicians and networks of fellow scientists. He was a corresponding member of the National Museum of Natural History in France. He also called the first congress of the International Association for Caribbean Archaeology, bringing together all those studying the Caribbean and the South American mainland. In 1952, he discovered a pre-Columbian site at Petite Rivière; part of a series of discoveries made at that time, evidencing Amerindian life in La Désirade, including the vaulted structure at Pain, on the plateau, and of the Kikali cave dig directed by Jacques Petitjean Roget. He also excavated sites at Marigot and Sainte Marie, discovering Caribbean and Arawak pottery created by populations which had gone by the end of the 15th century.

He was introduced to archaeology by his predecessor at the college, Father Delawarde, learning by taking part in digs on known sites, and investigated the North East and South east of Martinique. The results of these investigations allowed him to confirm Father Delawarde's theory, who argued that Martinique stored evidence of two civilizations, living on Martinique in succession; the Arawak and Caribs. This was established through the study of ceramics. Fr. Pinchon contrasted the Arawaks, who created three sided pots, with the Caribs, who used the colombin method, which produces pots which are considered less fine. In a display of his collection in 1997 for IACA, a range of 658 items could be displayed, found across Martinique, Guadeloupe, Marie-Galante, St Kitts, St Lucia and Saint Vincent. His work also took him to Guatemala and French Guiana.

== Publications ==
1960 Programme de la classe de 5e. Les Sciences d'observation aux Antilles (5th grade syllabus. Observational science in the Antilles).

1961 The Archaeological Problem in Martinique. A General View 1st IACA Congress, Martinique 1961 Vol.I: 69 & 75

1969 Faune des Antilles françaises (Fauna of the French Antilles), volume 1 : Les oiseaux (birds) and volume 2 : Les papillons (butterflies).

1967 Quelques aspects de la nature aux Antilles (Some aspects of nature in the Antilles).

1971 D'Autres aspects de la nature aux Antilles (Other aspects of nature in the Antilles).

1973 Nature antillaise (Caribbean nature).

1976 Le Dynaste Hercule dans les Petites Antilles (The Hercules Beetle in the Lesser Antilles).

== Memorials ==
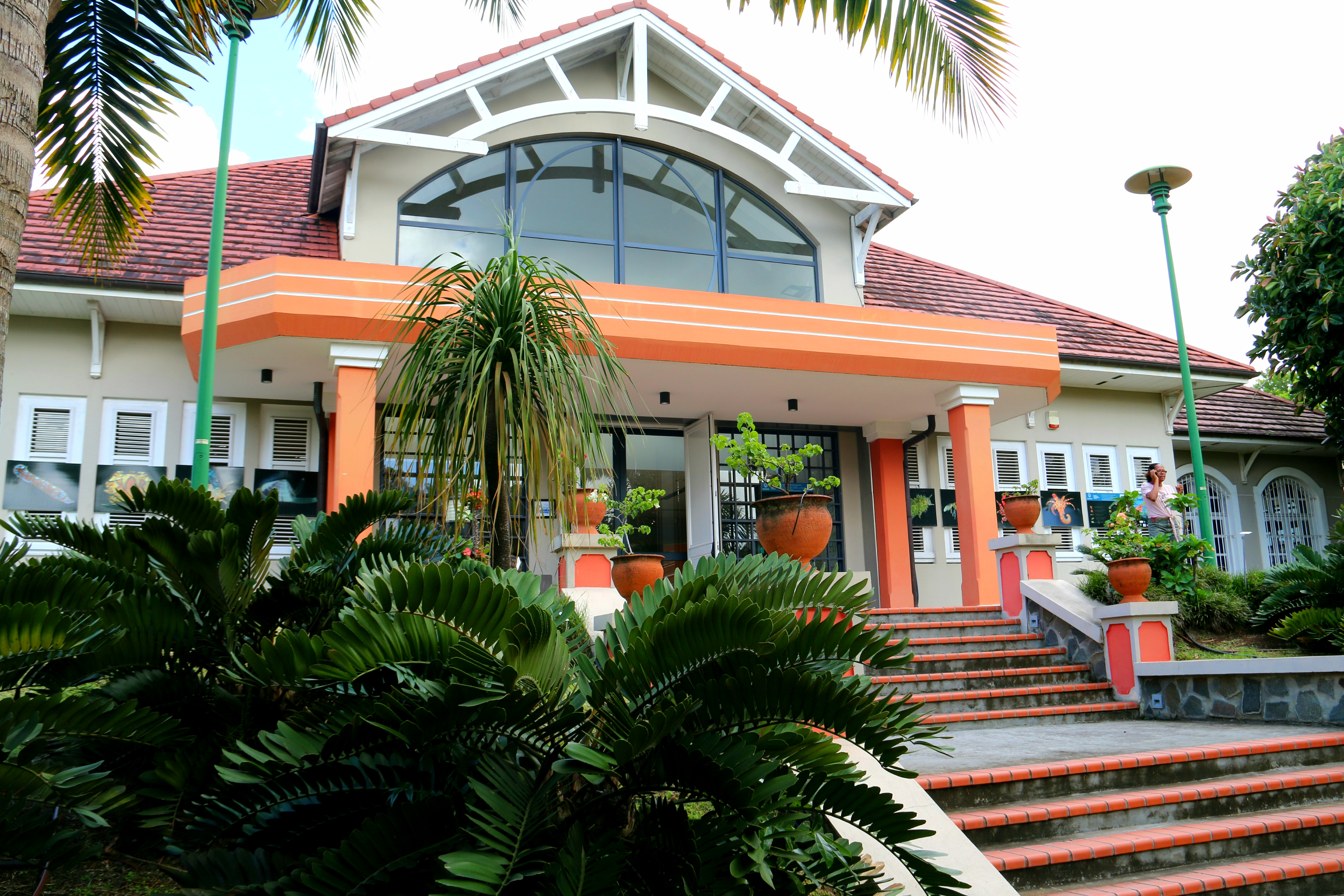
Musée du Père Pinchon

The most prominent memorial to the man and his work, is the Musée du Père Pinchon (Père Pinchon Museum) in Fort-de-France, which displays his entire collection.

== In literature ==
A well known figure on Martinique, Pinchon is called on to exemplify an entomologist in Solibo the Magnificent and to describe a moment of public life in Fort de France, in Texaco, both written by Patrick Chamoiseau.
