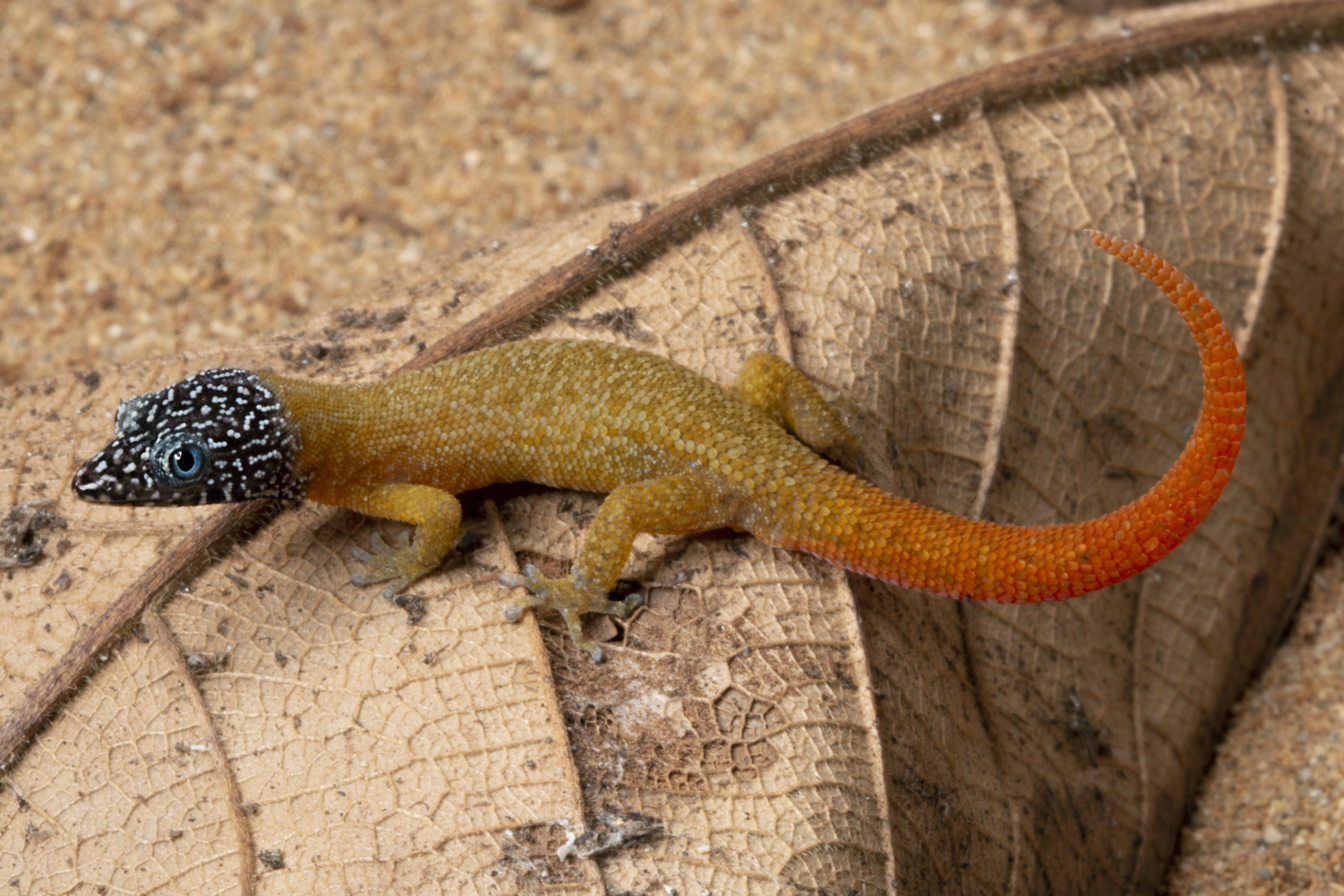
- Adult male specimen from Guadeloupe

Conservation status
- Least Concern (IUCN 3.1)

Scientific classification
- Kingdom: Animalia
- Phylum: Chordata
- Class: Reptilia
- Order: Squamata
- Suborder: Gekkota
- Family: Sphaerodactylidae
- Genus: Sphaerodactylus
- Species: S. fantasticus

Binomial name
- Sphaerodactylus fantasticus A.M.C. Duméril & Bibron, 1836

Subspecies
- See text

= Fantastic least gecko =

Species of lizard

Distribution of Sphaerodactylus fantasticus in the Lesser Antilles. Known range in red. Subspecies by color: Sphaerodactylus fantasticus anidrotus = red S. f. fantasticus = blue; S. f. fuga = black; S. f. hippomanes = pink; S. f. ligniservulus = purple; S. f. orescius = brown; S. f. tartaropylorus = green; intergrades and populations not assigned to any subspecies = gray.

The fantastic least gecko, or fantastic sphaero (Sphaerodactylus fantasticus) is a species of gecko found in the Caribbean, on the islands of Dominica, Montserrat, and the Guadeloupe archipelago.

== Morphology ==
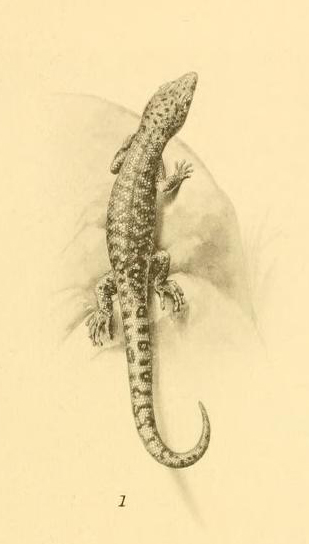
1921 illustration of the specimen from Guadeloupe

A medium-sized gecko of the genus Sphaerodactylus. Dorsal scales are keeled in texture, acute to cycloid in shape, and slightly imbricate. The color pattern is sexually dichromatic, and varies greatly between subspecies.

The dorsal ground color of both sexes is brown to ochre. The head color is light brown which may be with or without markings, including dark stripes broken into small brown spots, or spots that fuse to produce a dark head with light stripes for spots. There is no dark scapular patch or ocelli in both sexes, a characteristic that is frequently seen in other species. The dorsal coloration is (salt and pepper) mottled with light and dark scales, either of which may dominate. The tail may contain dark-edged light ocelli (usually paired) irregularly arranged along the dorsal surface. Throat is grayish and distinctly lineate, with lines extending posteriorly from the tip of the snot. Venter is uniformly white or with dark spackling.

== Subspecies ==
Nine subspecies have been described, each with a very restricted range and varies in coloration and other physical characteristics.

- Sphaerodactylus fantasticus fantasticus A.M.C. Duméril & Bibron, 1836
- Sphaerodactylus fantasticus anidrotus Thomas, 1965
- Sphaerodactylus fantasticus fuga Thomas, 1965
- Sphaerodactylus fantasticus hippomanes Thomas, 1965
- Sphaerodactylus fantasticus karukera Thomas, 1965
- Sphaerodactylus fantasticus ligniservulus King, 1962
- Sphaerodactylus fantasticus orescius Thomas, 1965
- Sphaerodactylus fantasticus phyzacinus Thomas, 1965
- Sphaerodactylus fantasticus tartaropylorus Thomas, 1965

== Distribution ==
Endemic to the Lesser Antilles. Native to Guadeloupe (including some of its satellites like Marie Galante and La Desirade), Montserrat, and the western coast of Dominica.

=== Biogeography ===
On Dominica, the distribution of the subspecies S. fantasticus fuga is limited to the western coast (Malhotra and Thorpe 1999). These dwarf geckos have recently been found to be genetically similar to one population in Guadeloupe, suggesting that they are recent colonizers of Dominica (Malhotra and Thorpe 1999; Thorpe et al. 2008).

== Ecology ==
This is a terrestrial species that occurs in a moderately wide range of habitats which are usually near the coast. These include mesic and xeric forests, beaches, hillsides, and houses. During the day, it can be found (active) on piles of organic debris and leaf litter (in shaded situations). Also hiding under stones, logs, and piles of debris.

== Habitat ==
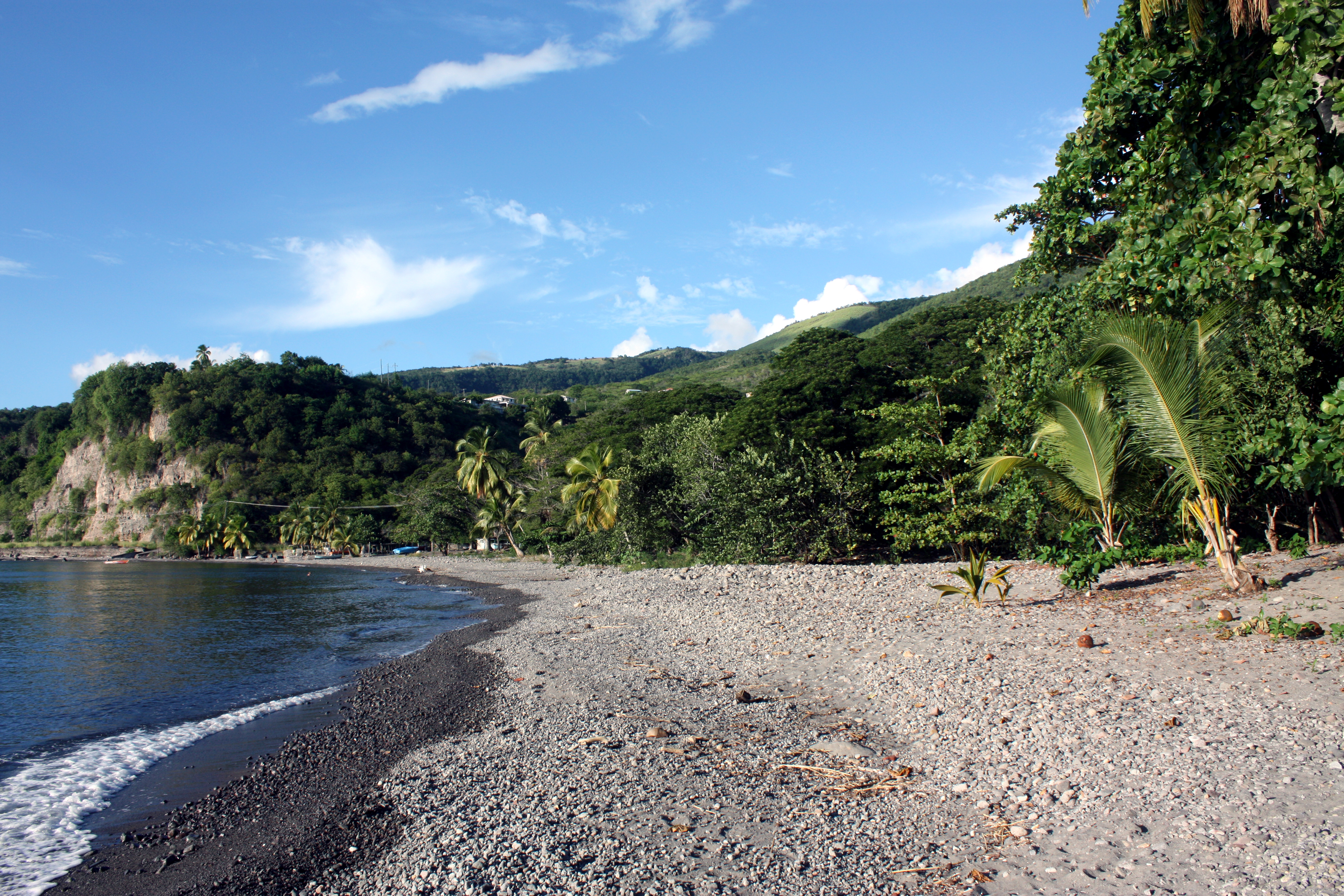
Habitat of Sphaerodactylus fantasticus fuga in Batali beach, western Dominica.

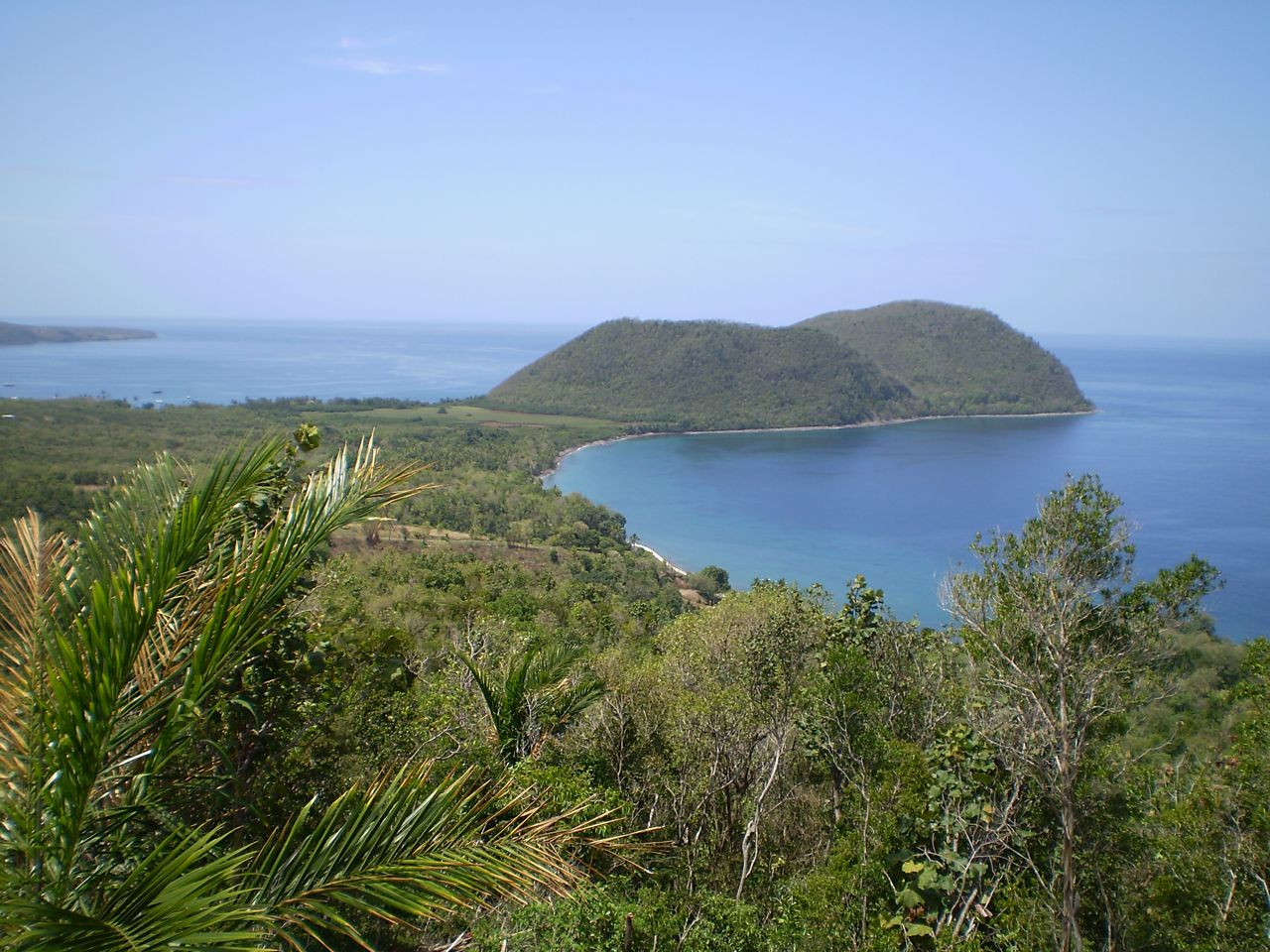
Habitat of Sphaerodactylus fantasticus fuga in Cabrits National Park, north-western Dominica.

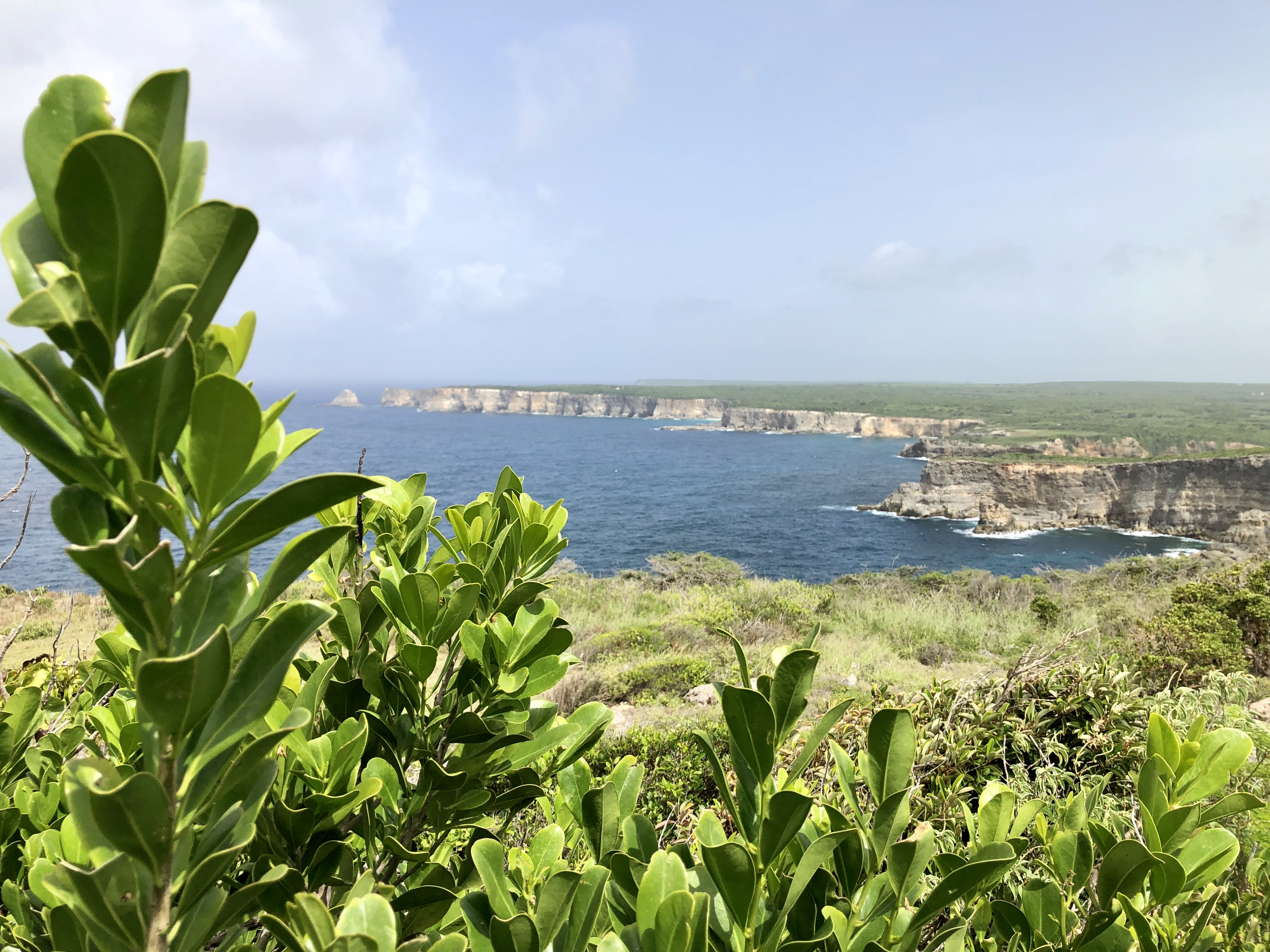
Habitat of Sphaerodactylus fantasticus tartaropylorus in Pointe de la Grande Vigie, north-eastern Guadeloupe.
