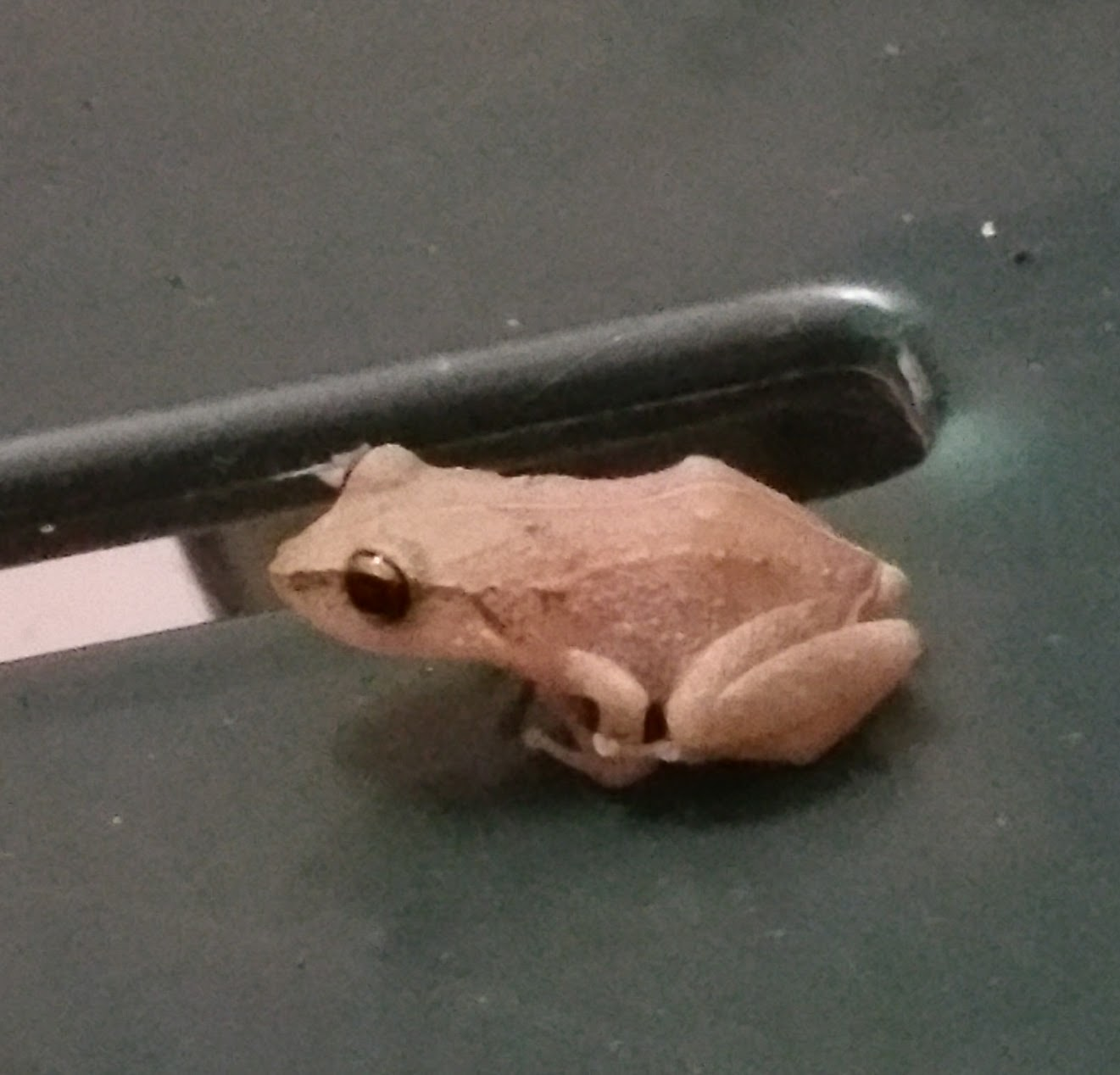

Conservation status
- Endangered (IUCN 3.1)

Scientific classification
- Kingdom: Animalia
- Phylum: Chordata
- Class: Amphibia
- Order: Anura
- Family: Eleutherodactylidae
- Genus: Eleutherodactylus
- Subgenus: Eleutherodactylus
- Species: E. pinchoni

Binomial name
- Eleutherodactylus pinchoni Schwartz, 1967

= Eleutherodactylus pinchoni =

Species of frog

Eleutherodactylus pinchoni is a species of frog in the family Eleutherodactylidae. It is endemic to Guadeloupe and known from the Basse-Terre. Common name Grand Cafe robber frog has been coined for it (type locality is near "Grand Café").

== Etymology ==
The specific name pinchoni honors Robert Pinchon, French priest and professor who settled in Martinique in 1945 and assisted Albert Schwartz on his expeditions.

== Description ==
Eleutherodactylus pinchoni is a small frog: males measure 14.4–16.0 mm (0.57–0.63 in) and females 15.2–20.2 mm (0.60–0.80 in) in snout–vent length; the smallest gravid female was 16.6 mm (0.65 in). The snout is acuminate. The tympanum is visible and almost circular. The fingers are long, slender, and unwebbed, but have moderately well-developed discs. The toes are of moderate length and have vestigial webbing. The dorsum is very finely granular. Dorsal coloration is rich, dark wood brown, with variable patterning displaying four basic types. The most common pattern is a pair of relatively broad dorsal chevrons and—usually—a diagonal flank bar from each end of the second chevron into the groin. Some specimens also have two chevrons, but the posteriormost of which cuts off a middorsal patch of reddish-brown pigment in the sacral area. Instead of chevrons, some specimens have a pair of reddish-brown dorsolateral stripes. Finally, some frogs have a pair of dorsolateral lines as well as an irregular pale median dorsal stripe. The ventrum is orange, but this color may be almost completely obscured by overlying dark brown mottling, blotches, or stipples.

== Habitat and conservation ==
Natural habitats of Eleutherodactylus pinchoni are mesic forests and rainforests at elevations of 0–1,250 m (0–4,101 ft) asl. It also survives in secondary forest. It is a terrestrial frog. Males call from the ground or low vegetation, and the eggs are laid on the ground and on bromeliads.

Forest habitat suitable for Eleutherodactylus pinchoni is small in area and continues to decline in quality. It is also threatened by pollution from pesticides used in banana plantations, introduced predators (particularly rats, cats and mongooses), and the introduced frog Eleutherodactylus johnstonei that appears to be displacing it.
