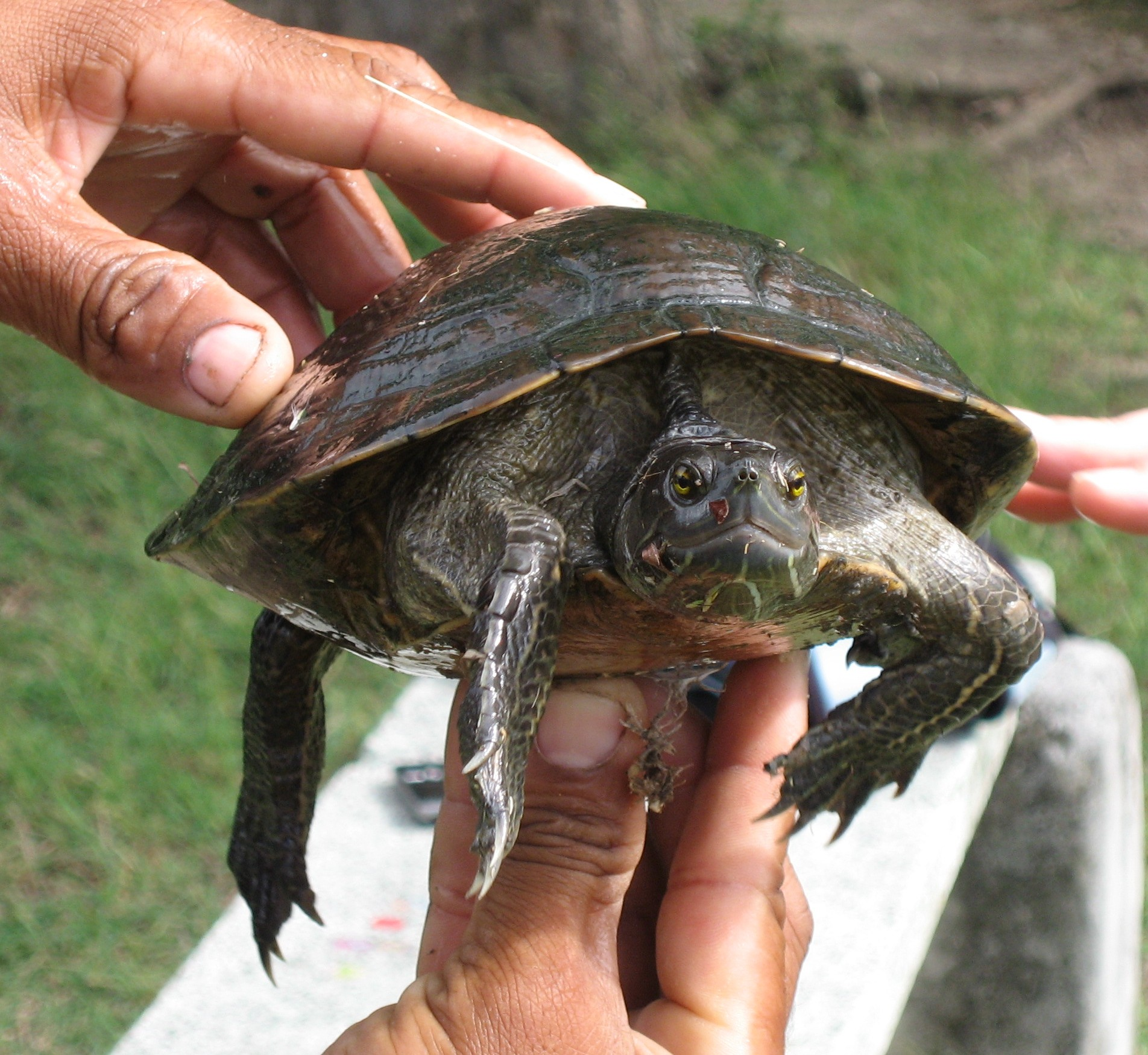

Conservation status
- Near Threatened (IUCN 2.3)

Scientific classification
- Kingdom: Animalia
- Phylum: Chordata
- Class: Reptilia
- Order: Testudines
- Suborder: Cryptodira
- Family: Emydidae
- Genus: Trachemys
- Species: T. stejnegeri

Binomial name
- Trachemys stejnegeri (Schmidt, 1928)

Synonyms
- Trachemys stejnegeri stejnegeri: Pseudemys stejnegeri Schmidt, 1928; Pseudemys palustris stejnegeri — Mertens, L. Müller & Rust, 1934; Pseudemys stejnegeri stejnegeri — Barbour & Carr, 1940; Pseudemys terrapen stejnegeri — Mertens & Wermuth, 1955; Pseudemys decussata stejnegeri — E. Williams, 1956; Chrysemys decussata stejnegeri — Schwartz & Thomas, 1975; Chrysemys stejnegeri — Bickham & Baker, 1976; Chrysemys terrapen stejnegeri — Obst, 1983; Trachemys stejnegeri — Seidel & Incháustegui, 1984; Trachemys stejnegeri stejnegeri — Iverson, 1985; Trachemys stejnegeri malonei: Pseudemys malonei Barbour & Carr, 1938; Pseudemys palustris malonei — Mertens, 1939; Pseudemys terrapen malonei — Mertens & Wermuth, 1955; Chrysemys malonei — Schwartz, 1968; Chrysemys terrapen malonei — Obst, 1983; Trachemys stejnegeri malonei — Iverson, 1985; Trachemys malonei — Seidel & Adkins, 1987; Trachemys stejnegeri vicina: Pseudemys vicina Barbour & Carr, 1940; Pseudemys stejnegeri vicina — Barbour & Carr, 1940; Pseudemys terrapen vicina — Mertens & Wermuth, 1955; Pseudemys decussata vicina — E. Williams, 1956; Chrysemys decussata vicina — Schwartz & Thomas, 1975; Chrysemys stejnegeri vicina — Bickham & Baker, 1976; Chrysemys terrapen vicina — Obst, 1983; Trachemys stejnegeri vicina — Seidel & Incháustegui, 1984; Chrysemys terrapen wicina Gosławski & Hryniewicz, 1993 (ex errore)

= Central Antillean slider =

Species of reptile

The Central Antillean slider (Trachemys stejnegeri) is a species of turtle in the family Emydidae. The species is found on three islands in the West Indies: Hispaniola, Great Inagua, and Puerto Rico.

== Etymology ==
The specific name, stejnegeri, is in honor of Norwegian-born American herpetologist Leonhard Stejneger.

== Geographic range ==
T. stejnegeri is found on the islands of Puerto Rico, Great Inagua, and Hispaniola (Dominican Republic and Haiti).

== Subspecies ==
Three subspecies are recognized as being valid, including the nominotypical subspecies.

- Trachemys stejnegeri stejnegeri (Schmidt, 1928) – Puerto Rican slider
- Trachemys stejnegeri malonei (Barbour & Carr, 1938) – Inagua slider
- Trachemys stejnegeri vicina (Barbour & Carr, 1940) – Dominican slider

Nota bene: A trinomial authority in parentheses indicates that the subspecies was originally described in a genus other than Trachemys.
