= Mabuya cochonae =

Conservation status
- Critically endangered, possibly extinct (IUCN 3.1)

Scientific classification
- Kingdom: Animalia
- Phylum: Chordata
- Class: Reptilia
- Order: Squamata
- Family: Scincidae
- Genus: Mabuya
- Species: M. cochonae

Binomial name
- Mabuya cochonae Hedges & Conn, 2012

Species of lizard

Mabuya cochonae, the Cochons skink, is a species of lizard in the subfamily Lygosominae of the family Scincidae. The species is endemic to Guadeloupe. It is considered to be possibly extinct.
