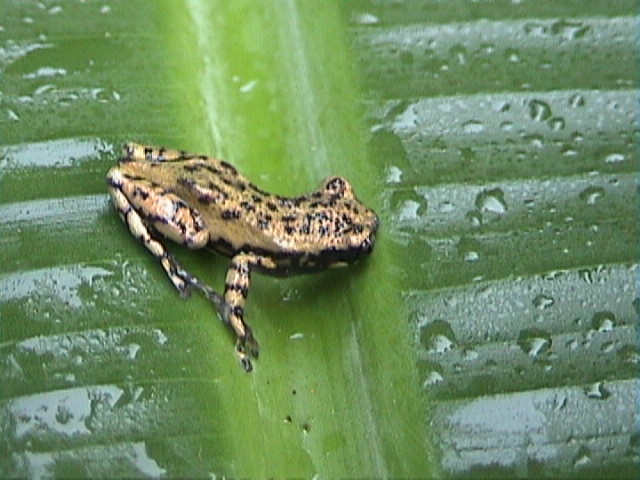

Conservation status
- Least Concern (IUCN 3.1)

Scientific classification
- Kingdom: Animalia
- Phylum: Chordata
- Class: Amphibia
- Order: Anura
- Family: Hylidae
- Genus: Scinax
- Species: S. x-signatus

Binomial name
- Scinax x-signatus (Spix, 1824)

Synonyms
- Hyla x-signata Spix, 1824; Hyla affinis Spix, 1824; Hyla coerulea Spix, 1824

= Scinax x-signatus =

Species of frog

Scinax x-signatus (common name: Venezuela snouted treefrog or Venezuelan snouted treefrog) is a species of frog in the family Hylidae. It is found in Brazil, the Guyanas (Guyana, French Guiana, Suriname), Venezuela and Colombia. Introduced populations exist on Guadeloupe and two nearby smaller islands, Marie Galante and La Désirade, and on Martinique. It may represent more than one species.

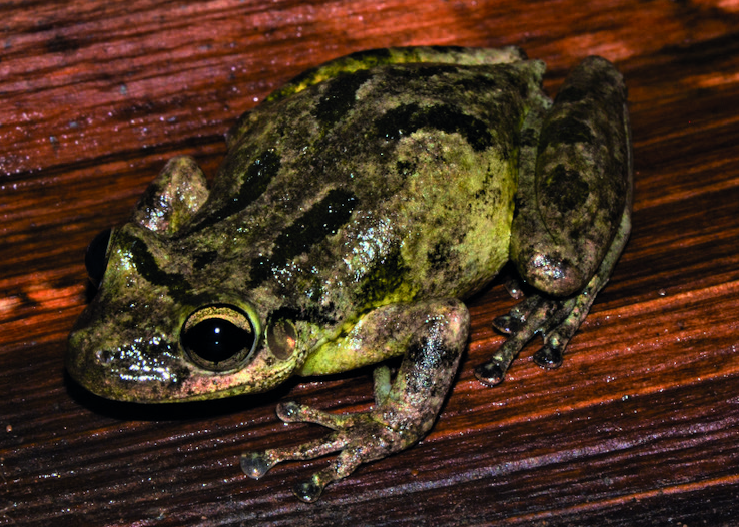
Amapá, Brazil

Scinax x-signatus is a very common frog inhabiting tropical savannas, forest edges, and open areas, and is very adaptable to habitat modification. It is considered an invasive species on Guadeloupe, threatening native frogs through competition.

== Reproduction ==
Breeding takes place in standing water, both permanent and seasonal. Males call from the vegetation above and around ponds.
