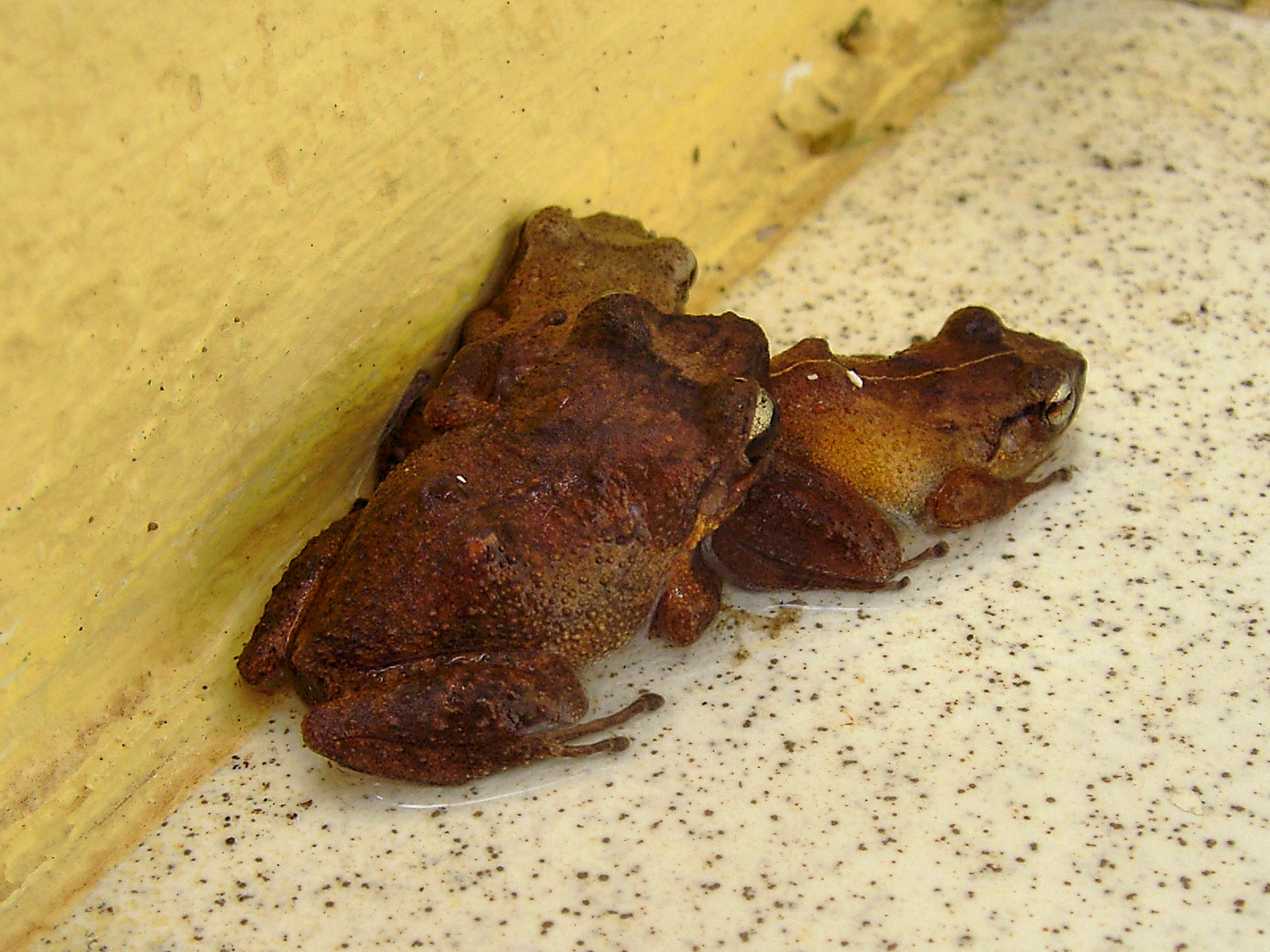

Conservation status
- Near Threatened (IUCN 3.1)

Scientific classification
- Kingdom: Animalia
- Phylum: Chordata
- Class: Amphibia
- Order: Anura
- Clade: Brachycephaloidea
- Family: Eleutherodactylidae
- Genus: Eleutherodactylus
- Species: E. martinicensis

Binomial name
- Eleutherodactylus martinicensis (Tschudi, 1838) (Note: Eleutherodactylus is from Duméril and Bibron, 1841, the unpublisished version of which Tschudi used to describe martinicensis.)

Synonyms
- Hylodes martinicensis Tschudi, 1838

= Eleutherodactylus martinicensis =

Species of frog

The Martinique robber frog (Eleutherodactylus martinicensis). also known as the Brown whistling frog, is a species of frog in the family Eleutherodactylidae found in Antigua and Barbuda, Dominica, Guadeloupe, Martinique, and Saint Lucia. It is the type species for Eleutherodactylus, a status it acquired after a convoluted taxonomic history. Its natural habitats are subtropical or tropical dry forests, subtropical or tropical moist lowland forests, subtropical or tropical moist montane forests, subtropical or tropical moist shrubland, subtropical or tropical seasonally wet or flooded lowland grassland, arable land, pastureland, plantations, rural gardens, urban areas, and heavily degraded former forests. It is threatened by habitat loss.

== Taxonomy ==
Eleutherodactylus martinicensis, the type species for Eleutherodactylus, has a convoluted taxonomic history.

While working on a manuscript that would eventually become the eighth volume of Erpétologie genérale, André Marie Constant Duméril and Gabriel Bibron assigned the frog to the genus they intended to give the name Eleutherodactylus for, giving the species the working name Eleutherodactylus martinicensis after the island of Martinique; however, Johann Jakob von Tschudi saw their unpublished manuscript and included the frog in a manuscript he published in 1838, but as Hylodes martinicensis, placing it the genus described by Leopold Fitzinger in 1828; Duméril and Bibron acquiesced to this and changed the name of the genus they had intended to call Eleutherodactylus to Hylodes when they finally published their manuscript; however, in their manuscript they tended to list their own working names in the synonymy of species that had since received other names or been placed in a pre-existing genus, despite not having published those names before or otherwise using them in their manuscript, and Eleutherodactylus martinicensis was one such case.

When Fitzinger coined the genus Hylodes he gave Hylodes gravenhorstii and Hylodes ranoides as members of the genus. The latter was a species originally described by Johann Baptist von Spix in 1824 with Hyla as the genus, one which it shared with Hyla nasus, described the year prior by Hinrich Lichtenstein. The former was a nomen nudum, a designation without a description. This left Hylodes ranoides as the only valid member of Hylodes, and therefore also as its type species. Tschudi recognized this, but he also coined the new genus Elosia for nasus; however, in 1873, Wilhelm Peters published a comparison of the type specimens of ranoides and nasus and determined that they were actually the same species, making ranoides a synonym of nasus, as nasus had been described a year before ranoides, and this meant that what was being calledElosia was actually Hylodes, all of which was pointed out by Leonhard Stejneger in his 1904 book Herpetology of Porto Rico. As ranoides was actually nasus and Elosia was actually Hylodes, this left the genus that had been erroneously referred to as Hylodes without a name and unable to have ranoides as its type species. Fitzinger had himself published a manuscript in 1843 in which he replaced ranoides as the type species of what was erroneously being referred to as Hylodes with martinicensis, and Stejneger made the decision to follow this classification, and as Duméril and Bibron had included Eleutherodactylus martinicensis as a synonym back in 1841, Stejneger revived the name Eleutherodactylus for the genus.

The taxonomy of Eleutherodactylus martinicensis is further convoluted by the species similarity to Eleutherodactylus johnstonei, described by Thomas Barbour in 1914, which during the 20th century led to many authors confusing the two species.

== Sources ==
- Duméril, André Marie Constant; Bibron, Gabriel (1841). Erpétologie genérale [General Herpetology] (in French). Vol. 8. Paris: Librairie encyclopédique de Roret – via Biodiversity Heritage Library.
- Kaiser, Hinrich; Hardy Jr., Jerry D. (1994a). Lynch, John D. (ed.). Eleutherodactylus martinicensis. Catalogue of American Amphibians and Reptiles. Vol. 582. Society for the Study of Amphibians and Reptiles. doi:10.15781/T23N20K1D – via University of Texas.
- Kaiser, Hinrich; Hardy Jr., Jerry D. (30 December 1994b). Lynch, John D. (ed.). Eleutherodactylus johnstonei. Catalogue of American Amphibians and Reptiles. Vol. 581. Society for the Study of Amphibians and Reptiles. doi:10.15781/T27D2QC6N – via University of Texas.
- Myers, George S. (11 April 1962). "The American Leptodactylid Frog Genera Eleutherodactylus, Hylodes (= Elosia), and Caudiverbera (= Calyptocephalus)". Copeia. 1962 (1): 195. doi:10.2307/1439498.
- Stejneger, Leonhard (1904). Herpetology of Porto Rico. Washington: U.S. Government Printing Office. doi:10.5962/bhl.title.11835.
