= Mabuya desiradae =

Conservation status
- Critically Endangered (IUCN 3.1)

Scientific classification
- Kingdom: Animalia
- Phylum: Chordata
- Class: Reptilia
- Order: Squamata
- Family: Scincidae
- Genus: Mabuya
- Species: M. desiradae

Binomial name
- Mabuya desiradae Hedges & Conn, 2012

Species of lizard

Mabuya desiradae, the Désirade skink, is a species of lizard in the subfamily Lygosominae of the family Scincidae. The species is endemic to Guadeloupe.
