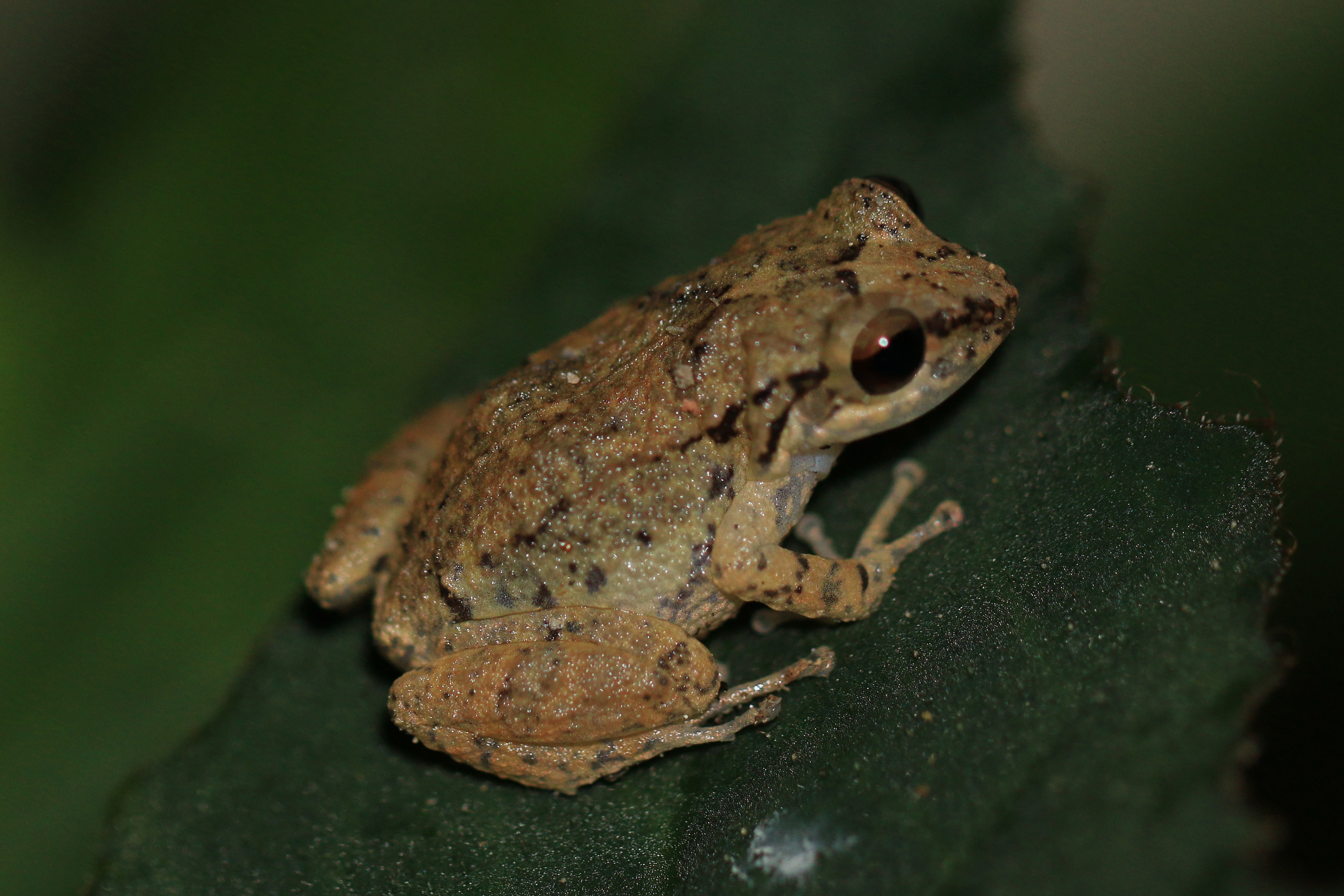
- in Jamaica

Conservation status
- Least Concern (IUCN 3.1)

Scientific classification
- Kingdom: Animalia
- Phylum: Chordata
- Class: Amphibia
- Order: Anura
- Clade: Brachycephaloidea
- Family: Eleutherodactylidae
- Genus: Eleutherodactylus
- Species: E. johnstonei

Binomial name
- Eleutherodactylus johnstonei Barbour, 1914

Synonyms
- Hylodes johnstonei Nieden, 1923; Hyla barbudensis Auffenberg, 1958; Eleutherodactylus barbudensis Lynch, 1966

= Antilles coquí =

Species of amphibian

The Antilles coquí (Eleutherodactylus johnstonei), also known by the common names Johnstone's whistling frog, Montserrat whistling frog, Barbados whistling frog and Lesser Antillean whistling frog, is a species of frog in the family Eleutherodactylidae. It is native to the Lesser Antilles, but has spread across the world and is considered an invasive species.

== Taxonomy ==
Thomas Barbour first described the species in 1914, and gave it the specific name johnstonei after Robert S. Johnstone, Chief Justice of Grenada and the Grenadines, for his support of naturalists. The species similarity to Eleutherodactylus martinicensis, and the taxonomic history of Eleutherodactylus as a whole, has according to Hinrich Kaiser and Jerry D. Hardy Jr. been a source of confusion in determining which old publications are describing Eleutherodactylus johnstonei and which are describing a different species.

== Description ==
The snout-to-vent length of the species is around 35 mm (1.4 in) for females 25 mm (0.98 in) for males, but variation is high, especially so between different populations of the frog. Individuals have colourations ranging from brown to a greyish-tan, usually with colourful patterns, almost always including one chevron on their heads and often with another on their backs.

== Behaviour ==
The frog's call consists of a lower pitch note lasting 0.07–0.09 seconds followed by a higher pitch note lasting 0.18–0.27 seconds. Males tend to be about a meter off the ground, perched on leaves, when they make their calls. Individuals make up to 60 calls in a minute, but the average time between the end of one call and the beginning of the next is 1.2 seconds.

== Distribution and habitat ==
The frog is native to the Lesser Antilles, but its range has expanded to the entire Caribbean, up to Bermuda, down into South America and across the Pacific into greenhouses and botanical gardens in Europe. The frogs proficiency at establishing itself in places it has been introduced to has led to it being considered an invasive species.

The frog is capable of surviving in a wide variety of habitats, including urban ones, living at elevations ranging from sea level to over 1,700 metres (5,600 ft). Zoologist Albert Schwartz said of them that they dwell in "almost any terrestrial situation which offer concealment and some moisture"..

== Sources ==
- Kaiser, Hinrich; Hardy Jr., Jerry D. (30 December 1994). Lynch, John D. (ed.). Eleutherodactylus johnstonei. Catalogue of American Amphibians and Reptiles. Vol. 581. Society for the Study of Amphibians and Reptiles. doi:10.15781/T27D2QC6N – via University of Texas.
- Leonhardt, Franziska; Jimenez-Bolaño, Juan David; Ernst, Raffael (18 April 2019). "Whistling invaders: Status and distribution of Johnstone's Whistling frog (Eleutherodactylus johnstonei Barbour, 1914), 25 years after its introduction to Colombia". NeoBiota. 45: 39–54. doi:10.3897/neobiota.45.33515. ISSN 1314-2488.
- Schwartz, Albert (1967). "Frogs of the genus Eleutherodactylus in the Lesser Antilles" (PDF). Studies on the Fauna of Curaçao and other Caribbean Islands. 24 (1): 1–64 – via Naturalis.
