= List of reptiles of Iowa =

The following list of the reptiles of Iowa lists all of the snakes, turtles, and lizards that are known to occur in the US state of Iowa.

== Lizards ==
There are five species of lizards in Iowa.

Common name	Scientific name	Status in Iowa	Picture
Five-lined skink	Plestiodon fasciatus		
Great Plains skink	Plestiodon obsoletus	Endangered	
Northern prairie skink	Plestiodon septentrionalis		
Six-lined racerunner	Aspidoscelis sexlineata		
Slender glass lizard	Ophisaurus attenuatus	Threatened	

== Snakes ==
There are 27 species of snakes in Iowa.

Common name	Scientific name	Status in Iowa	Picture
Black rat snake	Pantherophis obsoletus		
Brown snake	Storeria dekayi		
Bullsnake	Pituophis catenifer sayi	Special concern	
Common garter snake	Thamnophis sirtalis		
Copperbelly water snake	Nerodia erythrogaster neglecta	Endangered	
Copperhead	Agkistrodon contortrix	Endangered	
Diamondback water snake	Nerodia rhombifer	Threatened	
Eastern hognose snake	Heterodon platirhinos		
Graham's crayfish snake	Regina grahamii		
Lined snake	Tropidoclonion lineatum		
Massasauga rattlesnake	Sistrurus catenatus	Endangered	
Milk snake	Lampropeltis triangulum		
Northern water snake	Nerodia sipedon		
Plains garter snake	Thamnophis radix		
Prairie kingsnake	Lampropeltis calligaster		
Prairie rattlesnake	Crotalus viridis	Endangered	
Prairie ringneck snake	Diadophis punctatus arnyi		
Racer	Coluber constrictor		
Redbelly snake	Storeria occipitomaculata		
Smooth earth snake	Virginia valeriae		
Smooth green snake	Opheodrys vernalis	Special concern	
Speckled kingsnake	Lampropeltis getula holbrooki	Threatened	
Timber rattlesnake	Crotalus horridus		
Western fox snake	Pantherophis ramspotti		
Western hognose snake	Heterodon nasicus	Endangered	
Western ribbon snake	Thamnophis proximus		
Western worm snake	Carphophis vermis	Threatened	

== Turtles ==
There are 13 species of turtle in Iowa.

Common name	Scientific name	Status in Iowa	Picture
Blanding's turtle	Emydoidea blandingii	Threatened	
Common map turtle	Graptemys geographica		
Common musk turtle	Sternotherus odoratus	Threatened	
False map turtle	Graptemys pseudogeographica		
Ornate box turtle	Terrapene ornata	Threatened	
Ouachita map turtle	Graptemys ouachitensis		
Painted turtle	Chrysemys picta		
Red-eared slider	Trachemys scripta elegans		
Smooth softshell turtle	Apalone mutica		
Snapping turtle	Chelydra serpentina		
Spiny softshell turtle	Apalone spinifera		
Wood turtle	Glyptemys insculpta	Endangered	
Yellow mud turtle	Kinosternon flavescens	Endangered	

== See also ==
- List of amphibians of Iowa
