= List of amphibians of Iowa =

The following is a list of amphibians that are known to inhabit the US State of Iowa. The list includes frogs, toads, and salamanders.

== Frogs and toads ==
There are 17 species of frogs and toads in Iowa.

Common name	Scientific name	Status in Iowa	Picture
American toad	Anaxyrus americanus		
Blanchard's cricket frog	Acris blanchardi		
Boreal chorus frog	Pseudacris maculata		
American bullfrog	Lithobates catesbeianus		
Cope's gray treefrog	Hyla chrysoscelis		
Crawfish frog	Lithobates areolatus	Endangered	
Fowler's toad	Anaxyrus fowleri		
Gray treefrog	Hyla versicolor		
Great Plains toad	Anaxyrus cognatus		
Green frog	Lithobates clamitans		
Northern leopard frog	Lithobates pipiens		
Pickerel frog	Lithobates palustris		
Plains leopard frog	Lithobates blairi		
Plains spadefoot toad	Spea bombifrons		
Southern leopard frog	Lithobates sphenocephalus		
Spring peeper	Pseudacris crucifer		
Woodhouse's toad	Anaxyrus woodhousii		

== Salamanders ==
There are 5 species of salamanders in Iowa.

Common name	Scientific name	Status in Iowa	Picture
Blue-spotted salamander	Ambystoma laterale	Endangered	
Central newt	Notophthalmus viridescens louisianensis	Threatened	
Common mudpuppy	Necturus maculosus	Threatened	
Small-mouth salamander	Ambystoma texanum		
Tiger salamander	Ambystoma tigrinum		

== See also ==
- List of reptiles of Iowa
