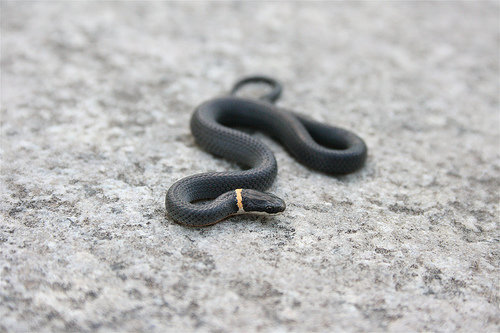
- Northern ringneck snake

Scientific classification
- Kingdom: Animalia
- Phylum: Chordata
- Class: Reptilia
- Order: Squamata
- Suborder: Serpentes
- Family: Colubridae
- Genus: Diadophis
- Species: D. punctatus
- Subspecies: D. p. edwardsii

Trinomial name
- Diadophis punctatus edwardsii (Merrem, 1820)

Synonyms
- Coluber edwardsii Merrem, 1820; Diadophis punctatus edwardsii — Dunn, 1920

= Diadophis punctatus edwardsii =

Subspecies of snake

Diadophis punctatus edwardsii, commonly known as the northern ringneck snake, is a subspecies of Diadophis punctatus, a snake in the family Colubridae. The subspecies is endemic to North America.

== Etymology ==
The subspecific name, edwardsii, is in honor of English ornithologist George Edwards, who described it, without giving it a binomial name, from a specimen he had received from William Bartram.

== Description ==
The northern ringneck snake has a body color from bluish grey to black, with a complete narrow yellow or orange ring around its neck and an underside matching the ring and generally lacking any dark spotting or patterning. The complete ring and lack of large dark spots on the belly differentiate it from other subspecies of D. punctatus. In some regions, there are areas of intergradation with other subspecies. Generally from 10 to 15 inches (25 to 38 centimetres) in total length (including tail) as an adult, it can reach more than two feet (61 cm) in length.

== Geographic range ==
In Canada D. p. edwardsii is found in the southern parts of Ontario, Quebec, and New Brunswick, and also in Nova Scotia. In the United States it is found throughout New England, the Mid-Atlantic states, and the Great Lakes region, and also at higher elevations in the South. More specifically, it is found in the following: NE Alabama, Connecticut, NW Georgia, SE Illinois, S Indiana, Kentucky, Maine, W Maryland, Massachusetts, Michigan, NE Minnesota, S New Hampshire, N New Jersey, New York, W North Carolina, Ohio, Pennsylvania, Rhode Island, extreme NW South Carolina, E Tennessee, Virginia, West Virginia, Louisiana, Wisconsin, and Florida.

== Behavior ==
D. p. edwardsii is nocturnal and prone to hiding and traveling under rocks, fallen logs and leaf litter, so it is not commonly observed by people despite the potential abundant population density. Another subspecies in Kansas was found to have densities of 700 to 1,800 per 1 hectare (0.0039 sq mi; 0.010 km^{2}). It is also social, and multiple ringnecks may be found in the same hiding spot during any season.

== Habitat ==
The favored habitat of the northern ringneck snake over most of its range is a moist wooded area, but it will also use the edges of wetlands or open areas in mountainous or hilly terrain. It is also often found in moist humid basements.

== Reproduction ==
A female D. p. edwardsii will lay her clutch of 2 to 10 eggs under a rock or in moist and rotting wood. Other female snakes may also use the same laying site, leading to single site egg finds of up to the mid fifties. The eggs hatch after about two months, and the young look essentially the same as the adults, possibly with a brighter color shade on the ring and belly. The eggs are 21–34 mm (3/4–1 1/4 in) long by 7–8 mm (1/4–1/4 in) wide, and the hatchlings are 100–125 mm (3.9–4.9 in) in total length. Egg laying is normally in early summer and hatching in late summer.

== Hibernation ==
In the winter D. p. edwardsii hibernates in locations from stone walls or cellars to small mammal burrows to brush piles or rotting logs.

== Diet ==
D. p. edwardsii preys upon insects, salamanders, earthworms, slugs, small lizards, small snakes, and frogs. The red-backed salamander (Plethodon cinereus) is a favorite food.

== As prey ==
D. p. edwardsii is known to be preyed upon by bullfrogs, toads, five species of predatory birds and six mammal species including shrews. Very young Northern ringneck snakes may also be eaten by large centipedes or large spiders.
