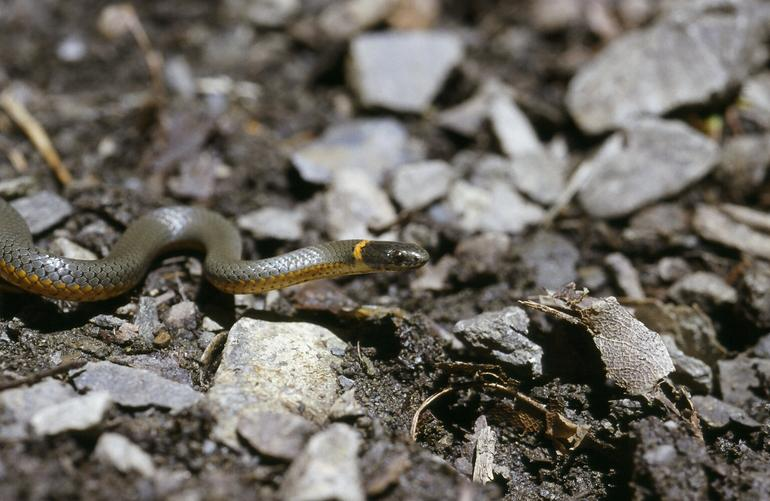
- Mississippi ringneck snake

Conservation status
- Least Concern (IUCN 3.1)

Scientific classification
- Domain: Eukaryota
- Kingdom: Animalia
- Phylum: Chordata
- Class: Reptilia
- Order: Squamata
- Suborder: Serpentes
- Family: Colubridae
- Genus: Diadophis
- Species: D. punctatus
- Subspecies: D. p. stictogenys

Trinomial name
- Diadophis punctatus stictogenys Cope, 1860

= Diadophis punctatus stictogenys =

Subspecies of snake

Diadophis punctatus stictogenys, commonly known as the Mississippi ringneck snake, is a subspecies of Diadophis punctatus that is endemic to the United States.

== Description ==
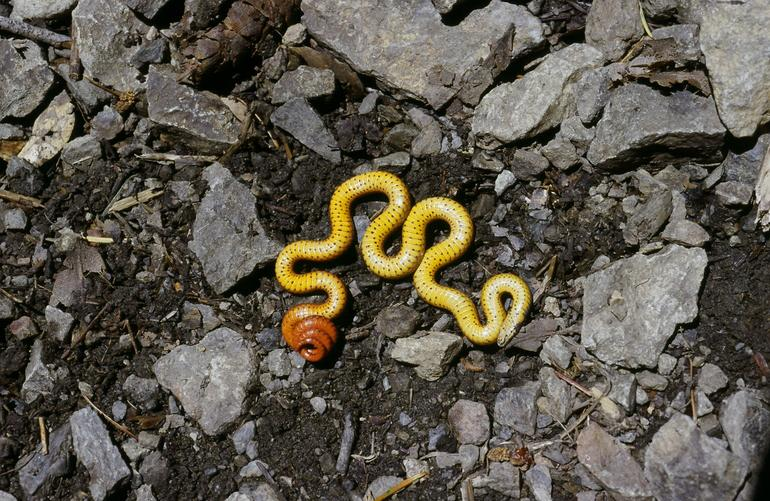
Ventral side of Diadophis punctatus stictogenys, showing the characteristic coloration and paired blacks spots.

Like D. p. punctatus, the Mississippi ringneck snake characteristically attains a maximum length of 44.5 centimetres (17.5 in). The head is black and the body dark gray, separated by a golden ring at the neck. The ventral side displays a yellow belly, transitioning to dark orange under tail. It can be differentiated from D. p. punctatus, with which it intergrades, by its black ventral markings that present as irregular black spots or paired black spots down the middle, rather than the a single row of black spots found in D. p. punctatus.

== Geographic range ==
It is found in the eastern half of the United States, throughout most of the southeastern states and into the central states, including as far north as Illinois.

== Habitat ==
Their favored habitat is pine forests, timbered hillsides, broken fields near water, and the bottoms of ravines. They can usually be found underneath logs, stones, and ground litter near stumps and tree bases.

== Reproduction ==
A female will lay a clutch of 2–8 eggs under rocks or moist and rotting wood. The eggs hatch after about five weeks.

== Diet ==
These snakes prey upon small vertebrates and small invertebrates, including insects.

== Predation ==
They are preyed upon by birds of prey, other snakes, and bullfrogs.
