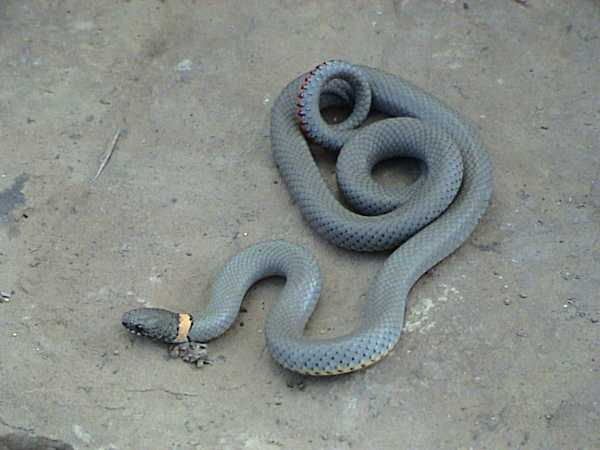

Scientific classification
- Kingdom: Animalia
- Phylum: Chordata
- Order: Squamata
- Suborder: Serpentes
- Family: Colubridae
- Genus: Diadophis
- Species: D. punctatus
- Subspecies: D. p. regalis

Trinomial name
- Diadophis punctatus regalis Baird & Girard, 1853

Synonyms
- Diadophis regalis Baird & Girard, 1853; Liophis regalis – Günther, 1893; Coronella regalis – Boulenger, 1894; Diadophis regalis – Cope, 1900; Diadophis regalis regalis – Schmidt & Davis, 1941; Diadophis punctatus regalis – Liner, 1994

= Diadophis punctatus regalis =

Subspecies of snake

Diadophis punctatus regalis, commonly known as the regal ringneck snake, is a subspecies of ringneck snake endemic to the southwestern United States and northern Mexico.

== Description ==
The regal ringneck snake is typically gray in color, with a dark-speckled white or cream underside, which becomes bright red or orange near and under the tail. It is distinguished by a yellow to orange ring around its neck which is typically bordered with black. However, the neck ring is frequently absent in this subspecies. The belly color extends onto one or more dorsal scale rows. They are among the larger of the ringneck snake subspecies, growing to a total length (including tail) of 20 to 87 cm (7.9 to 34.3 in). Their dorsal scales are smooth.

== Habitat ==
The regal ringneck snake is found in the desert, and in the mountains, unlike most snakes.

== Diet ==
The regal ringneck snake, unlike other subspecies, is almost exclusively ophiophagous, having a diet that consists primarily of other snakes, such as the earth snakes (genus Virginia) and the blackhead or flathead snakes (genus Tantilla). They have enlarged rear teeth (opisthoglypha) and a weak venom that serves to immobilize their small prey, but is harmless to humans.

== Behavior ==
Ringneck snakes are nocturnal, secretive snakes which spend most of their time hiding under rocks or other ground debris. If threatened, the ringneck snake typically hides its head and twists its tail in a corkscrew type motion, exposing its brightly colored underside, and expels a foul smelling musk from its cloaca.

== Reproduction ==
Mating occurs throughout the warmer months, with 3 to 10 eggs being laid at a time in a moist, protected area, sometimes in a communal nest with the eggs of several other females. The eggs are on average 19 mm (¾ in.) long by 7 mm (¼ in.) wide.
