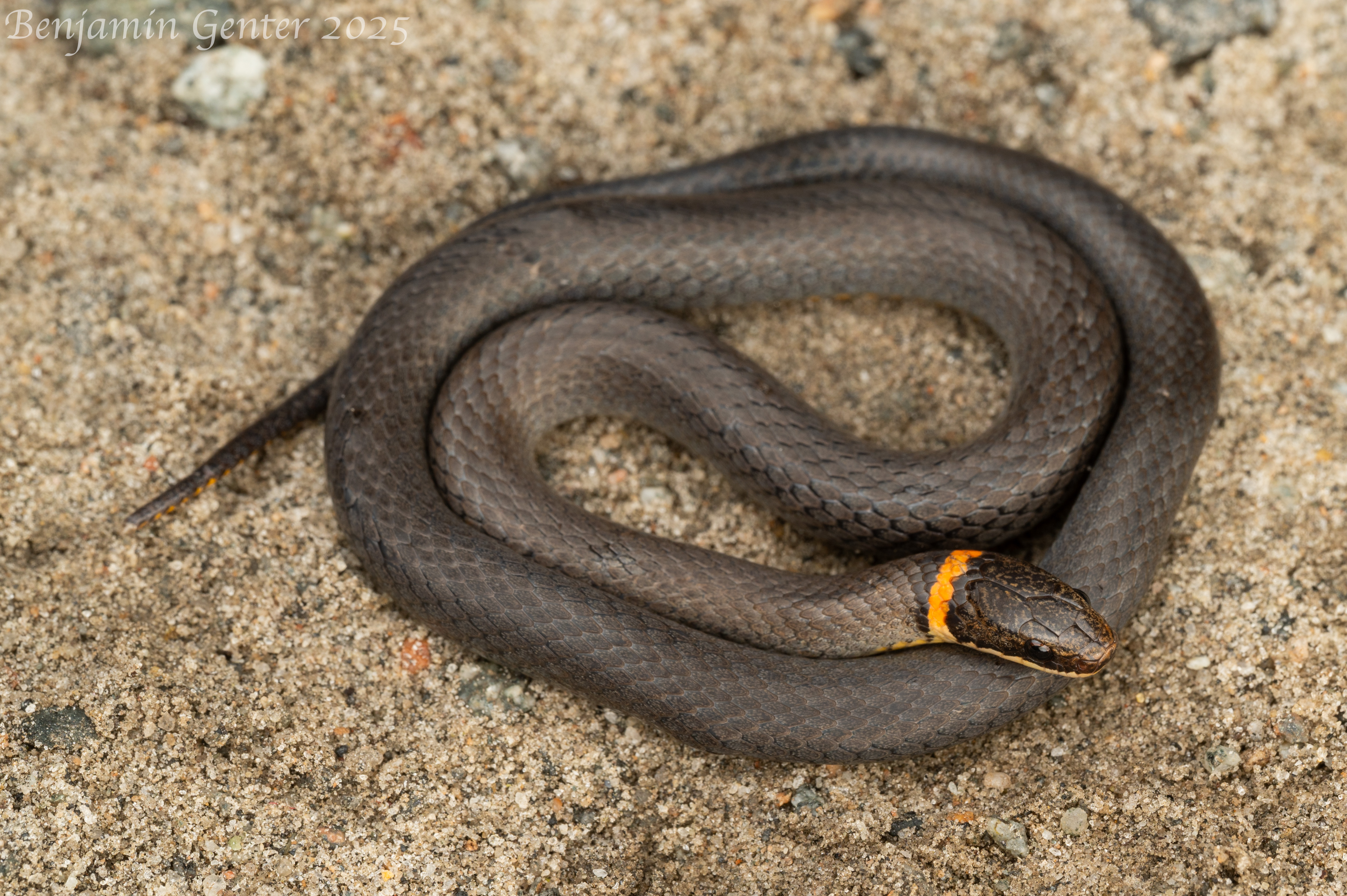

Conservation status
- Least Concern (IUCN 3.1)

Scientific classification
- Kingdom: Animalia
- Phylum: Chordata
- Class: Reptilia
- Order: Squamata
- Suborder: Serpentes
- Family: Colubridae
- Genus: Diadophis; Baird & Girard, 1853
- Species: D. punctatus

Binomial name
- Diadophis punctatus (Linnaeus, 1766)
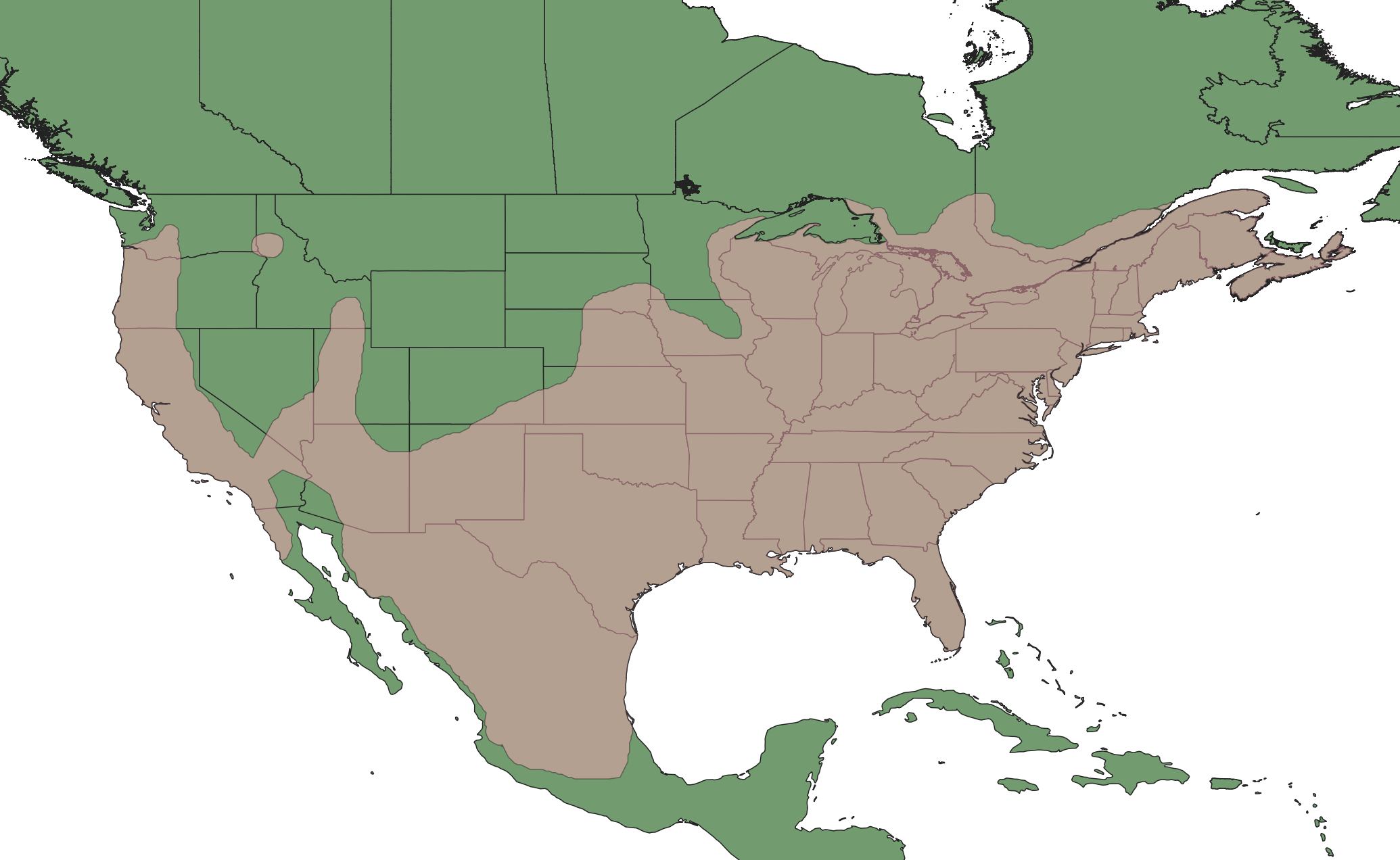

Synonyms
- Coluber punctatus Linnaeus, 1766; Calamaria punctata — Schlegel, 1837; Diadophis amabilis Baird & Girard, 1853; Ablabes punctatus — A.M.C. Duméril & Bibron, 1854; Coronella punctata — Boulenger, 1894; Diadophis punctatus — Cope, 1898

= Ring-necked snake =

Species of snake

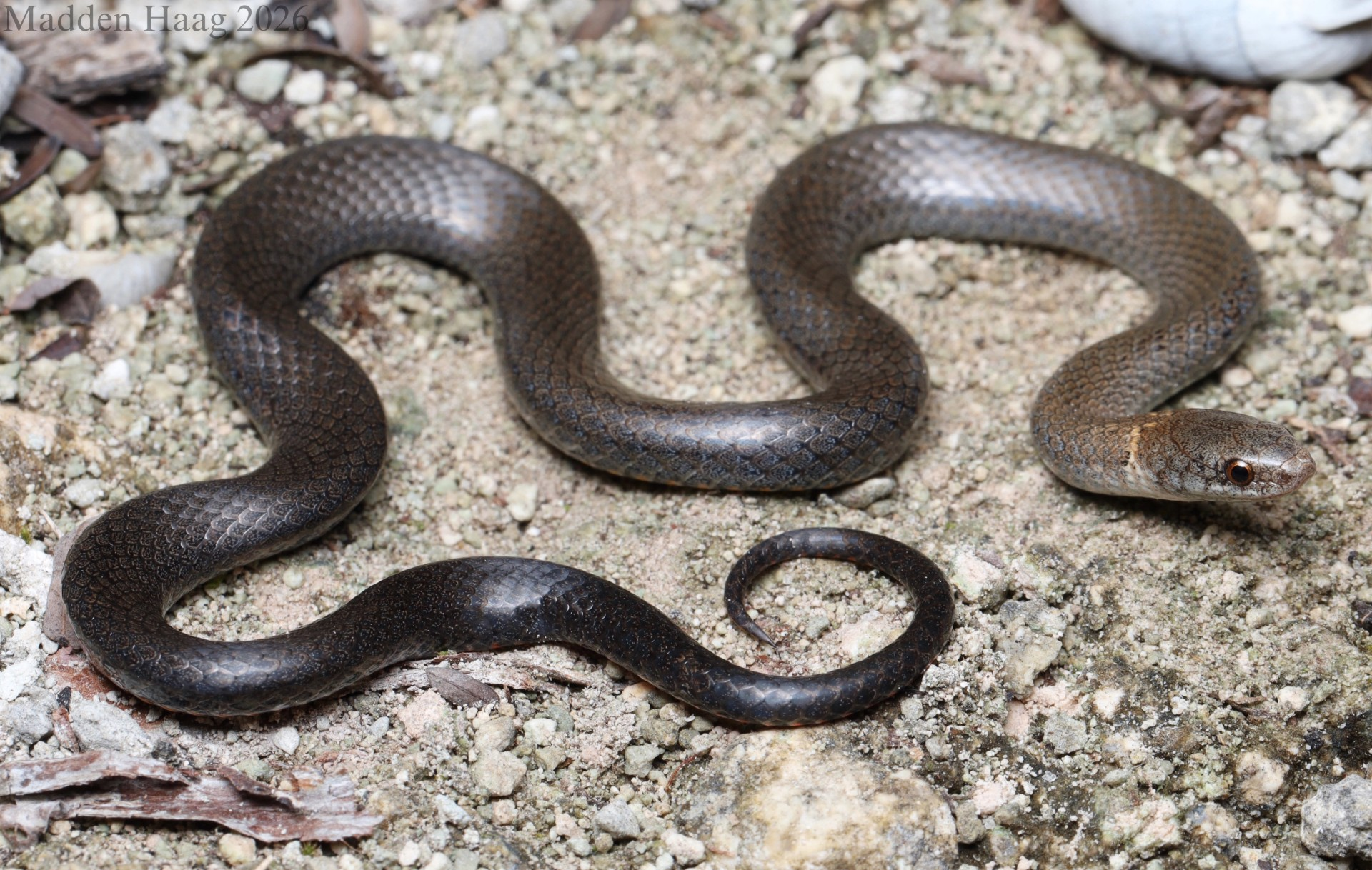
Key ring-necked snake, D. p. acricus

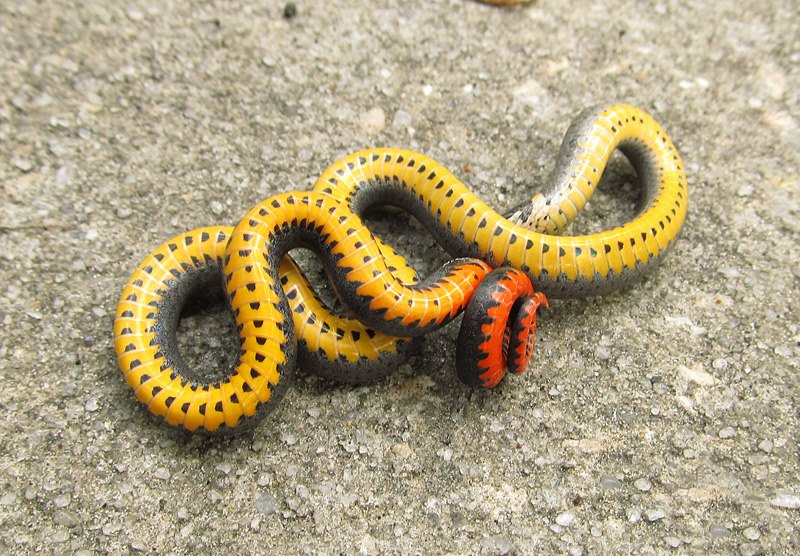
Southern ringneck snake, Diadophis p. punctatus

Diadophis punctatus, commonly known as the ring-necked snake or ringneck snake, is a small, harmless species of colubrid snake found throughout much of the United States, as well as south in Central Mexico and as far north as Nova Scotia, Canada. Ring-necked snakes are generally fossorial and somewhat secretive, by nature, and, as a nocturnal species, are rarely seen during the daytime. These snakes are believed to be fairly abundant throughout most of their range, though no scientific evaluation supports this hypothesis. Scientific research is lacking for the species, despite their apparently common status, and more in-depth investigations are greatly needed. It is the only species within the genus Diadophis and, currently, 14 subspecies are identified, though many herpetologists question the morphologically based classifications.

The ring-necked snake is perhaps best known for its unique defensive posture: when threatened, it curls its tail into a tight coil, partially rolls onto its back, and shows its bright red-orange underside and ventral surface. In nature, vivid coloration on an animal generally serves as a warning to others that it is not afraid of delivering a dose of venom, or that it is poisonous if eaten; this "false warning" coloration is a form of mimicry, a survival adaptation in which a non-venomous species (i.e., the ring-necked snake) has evolved brighter coloration, similar to truly venomous species, and used it to their advantage. Another example is seen in certain milksnakes and kingsnakes (Lampropeltis sp.) which have red, yellow, white or black stripes, an adaptation meant to confuse predators by visually mimicking the venomous coral snakes (Elapidae) which share much of their range.

== Description ==
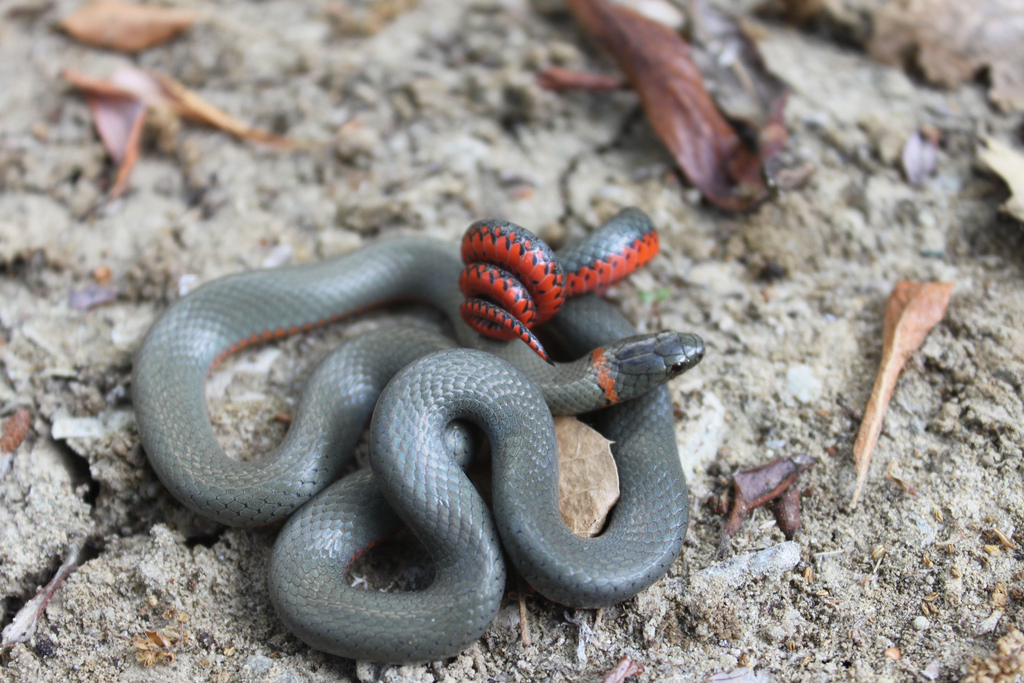
The defensive display of a San Bernardino ring-necked snake

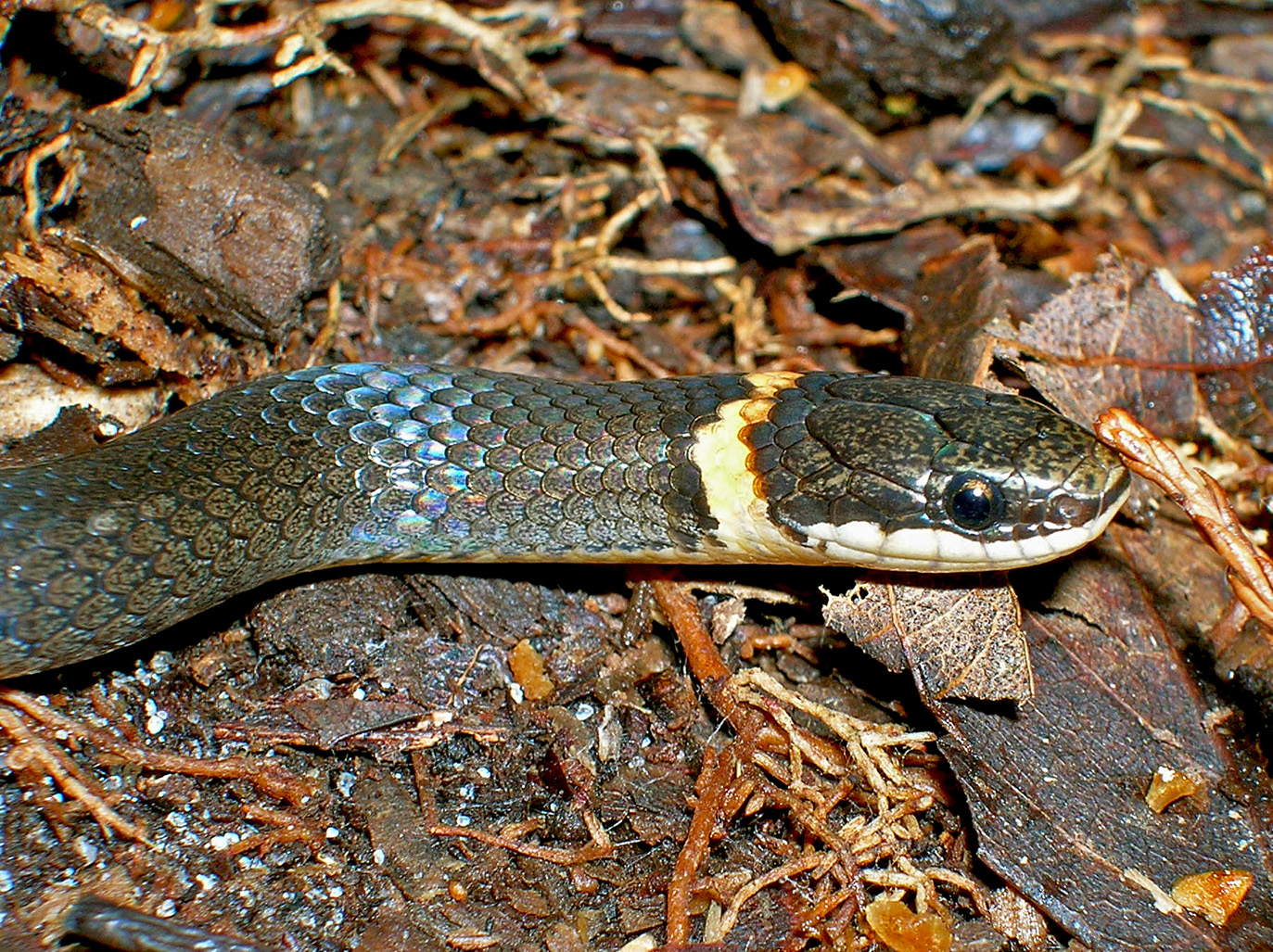
Southern ring-necked snake, D. p. punctatus

Ring-necked snakes are fairly similar in morphology throughout much of their distribution.

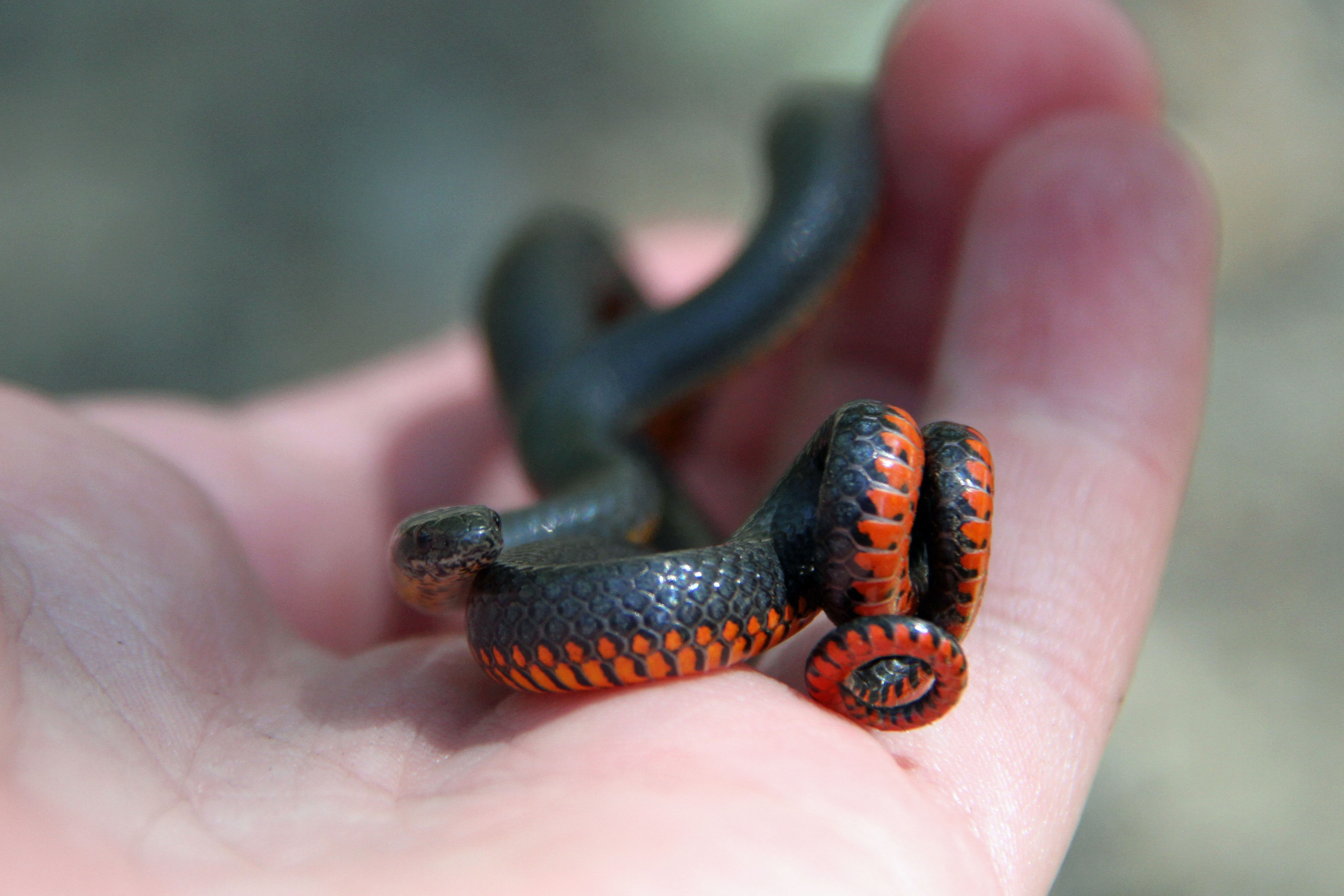
Ring-necked snake from Mount Diablo, California

Its dorsal coloration is solid olive, brown, bluish-gray to smoky black, broken only by a distinct yellow, red, or yellow-orange neck band. A few populations in New Mexico, Utah, and other distinct locations do not have the distinctive neck band. In another population throughout the Coastal Plains across the United States, the rings around their neck are often incomplete. Additionally, individuals may have reduced or partially colored neck bands that are hard to distinguish; coloration may also be more of a cream color rather than bright orange or red. Head coloration tends to be slightly darker than the rest of the body, with tendencies to be blacker than grey or olive. Ventrally, the snakes exhibit a yellow-orange to red coloration broken by crescent-shaped black spots along the margins. Some individuals lack the distinct ventral coloration, but typically retain the black spotting. Rarely do individuals lack both the ventral and neck band coloration, so the use of those two characteristics is the simplest way to distinguish the species.

Size also varies across the species' distribution. Typically, adults measure 25–38 cm (10–15 in) in length, except for D. p. regalis, which measures 38–46 cm (15–18 in). Maximum size for D. p. punctatus is reported at 52 cm (20.5 in). First-year juvenile snakes are typically about 20 cm (8 in) and grow about 2–5 cm (1–2 in) a year depending on the developmental stage or resource availability.

Ring-necked snakes have smooth scales with 15–17 scale rows at midbody. Males typically have small tubercles on their scales just anterior to the vent, which are usually absent in females.

== Distribution ==
Ring-necked snakes are fairly common throughout much of the United States extending into southeastern Canada and central Mexico. Mexican populations diverged first in the phylogenetic lineage of the subspecies of ringneck species. Eastern populations cover the entire Eastern Seaboard from the Gulf of Saint Lawrence continuous through the Gulf Coast of Texas. Distribution moves inland into northern Minnesota, continuing diagonally through the US to include all of Iowa, eastern Nebraska, and most of Kansas. In the western US, the distribution is significantly less continuous, with spotty, distinct population segments through most of the Pacific Northwest. Populations extend from south-central Washington continuing along the extreme West Coast into Mexico. Population segments extend inland into western Idaho, through southern Nevada, into central Utah, and continuing south through Arizona and central Mexico.

== Habitat ==
Ring-necked snakes occur in a wide variety of habitats. Preference seems to be determined by areas with abundant cover and denning locations. Northern and western subspecies are found within open woodlands near rocky hillsides, or in wetter environments with abundant cover or woody debris, as well as ponderosa pine-Oregon white oak, mixed forest, and shrub steppe. Southern subspecies exist primarily within riparian and wet environments, especially in more arid habitats. Stebbins (2003) identified the species as a snake of moist habitats, with moist soil conditions the preferred substrate. Ring-necked snakes are also not found above an elevation of 2,200 m (7,200 ft). In northern regions, dens are also important in identifying suitable ring-necked snake habitat. Dens are usually shared communally, and are identifiable by an existent subsurface crevasse or hole deep enough to prevent freezing temperatures. There is intraspecific variation in how den sites are chosen, with aggregate ring-necked snakes choosing dens that are on average 3 degrees Celsius above their ideal body temperature, while solitary snakes will choose dens that maintain their ideal body temperature. Since it is a woodland reptile, it can also commonly be found under wood or scraps. This cover is also utilized as a heat source instead of directly basking. Because of hot weather, they tend to make holes and burrows, or they hide under rocks or any suitable material. They are normally found in flatland forests. Though they prefer to remain away from human-made structures, ring-neck snakes are not afraid to utilize urbanized areas as refuge from predators. Moreover, throughout the year they tend to be active around March through October.

== Diet ==
The diet of the ring-necked snake consists primarily of smaller salamanders, earthworms, and slugs, but they also sometimes eat lizards, frogs, and some juvenile snakes of other species. The frequency at which prey species are chosen is dependent on their availability within the habitat. Michigan populations of the Eastern Ring-necked Snake (Diadophis punctatus edwardsii) feed almost exclusively on red-backed salamanders. Ring-necked snakes use a combination of constriction and envenomation to secure their prey. In a study analyzing the dietary habits of this species, age, amount of food consumed, and temperature were conditions that highly affected digestion. The snakes do not have a true venom gland, but they do have an analogous structure called the Duvernoy's gland derived from the same tissue, which evolved to assist in the subduing of larger prey items. Most subspecies are rear-fanged with the last maxillary teeth on both sides of the upper jaw being longer and channeled; the notable exception is D. p. edwardsii, which is fangless. The venom is produced in the Duvernoy's gland located directly behind the eye. It then drains out of an opening at the rear of the maxillary tooth. Ring-necked snakes first strike and then secure the prey using constriction. Next, they maneuver their mouths forward, ensuring the last maxillary tooth punctures the skin and allowing the venom to enter the prey's tissue. The secretion significantly affects the righting response of the prey. Ring-necked snakes are rarely aggressive to larger predators, suggesting their venom evolved as a feeding strategy rather than a defense strategy. Rather than trying to bite a predator, the snake winds up its tail into a corkscrew, exposing its brightly colored belly.

Ring-necked snakes are primarily nocturnal or highly crepuscular, though some diurnal activity has been observed. Individuals are sometimes found during the day, especially on cloudy days, sunning themselves to gain heat. Yet, most individuals lie directly under surface objects warmed in the sun and use conduction with that object to gain heat. Though ring-necked snakes are highly secretive, they do display some social structure, but the exact social hierarchies have never been evaluated. Many populations have been identified to have large colonies of more than 100 individuals, and some reports indicate some smaller colonies occupy the same microhabitats.

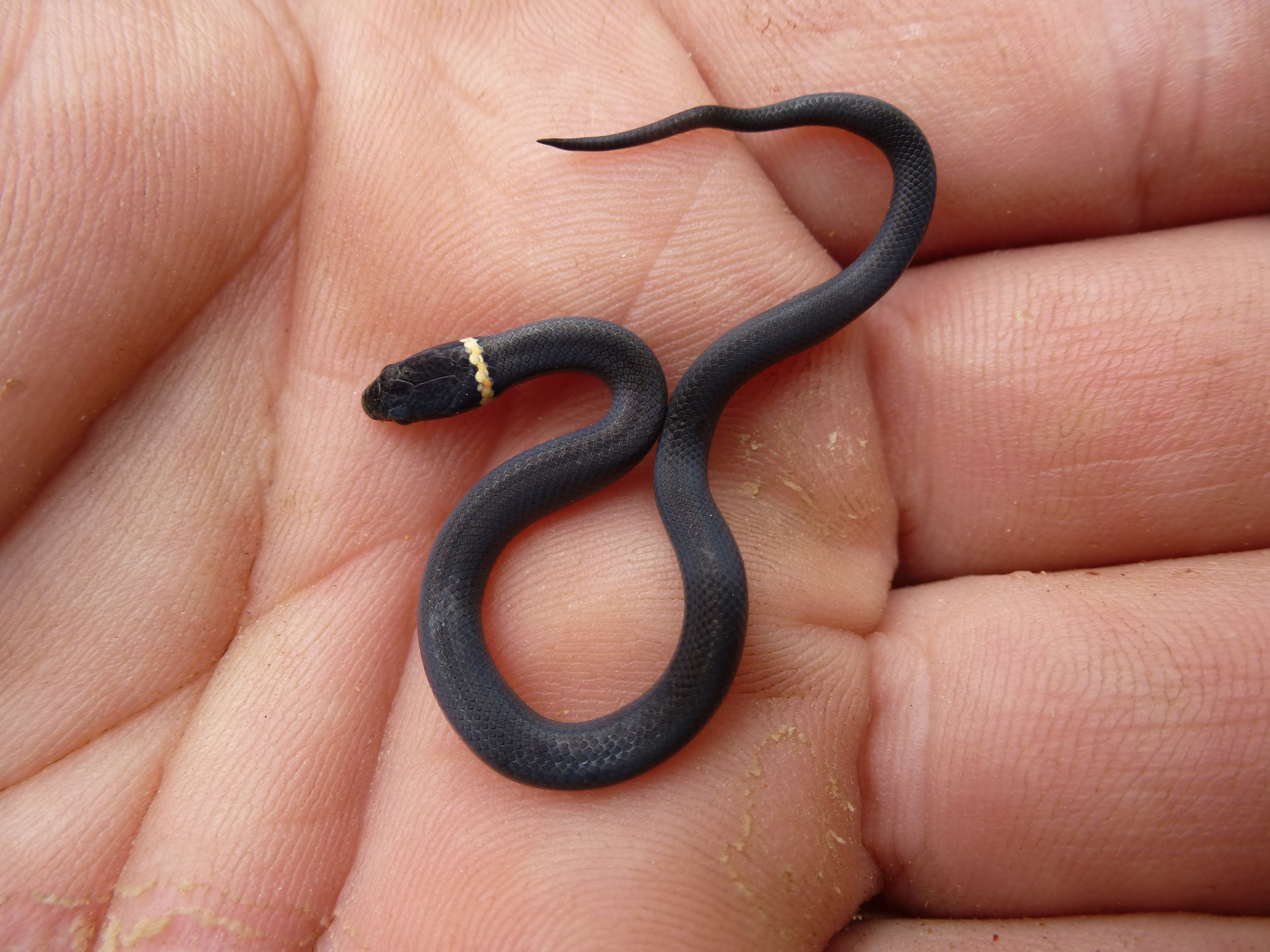
Recently hatched ring-necked snake, Missouri Ozarks

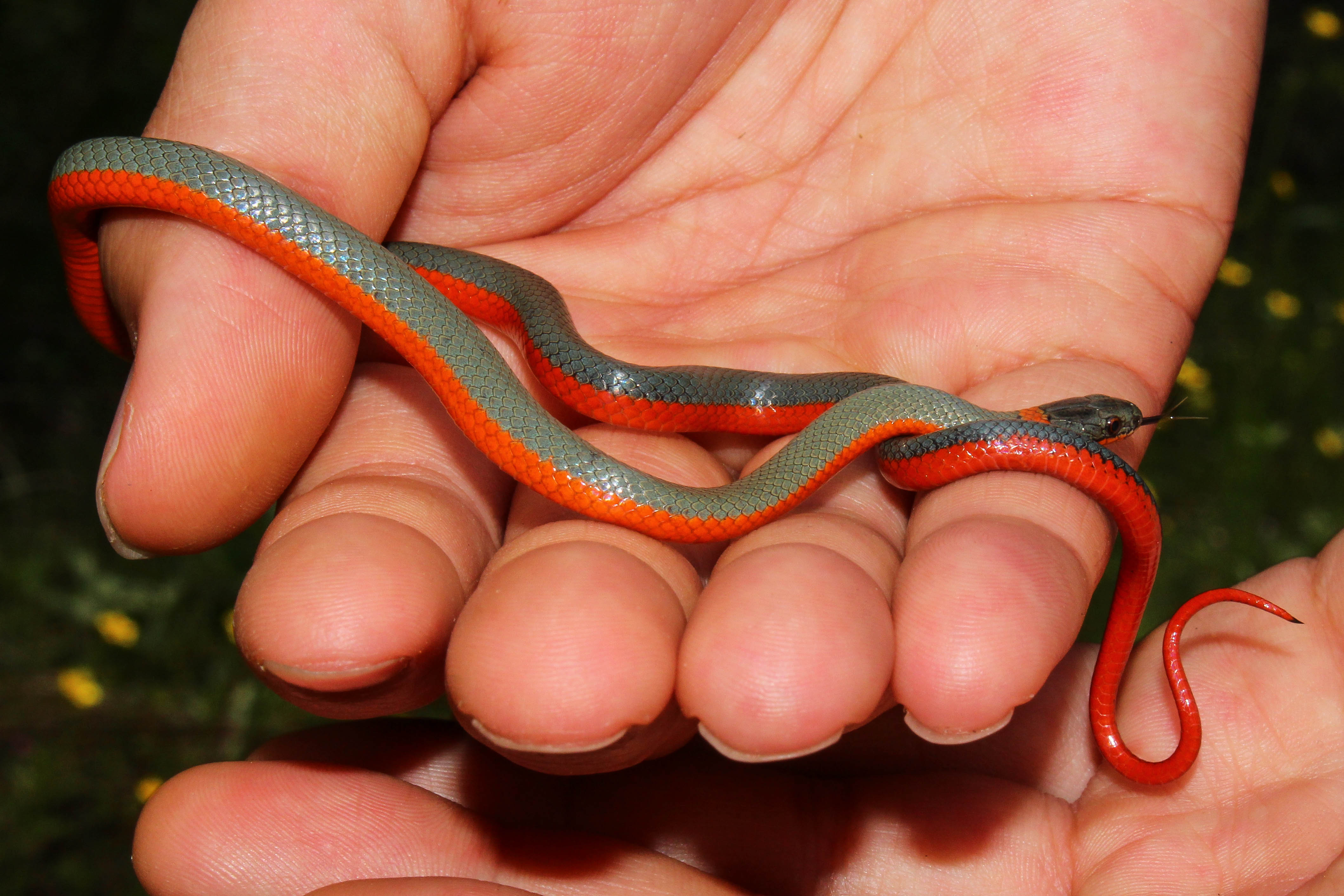
D. p. pulchellus, coralbelly ring-necked snake

== Reproduction ==
Ring-necked snakes usually mate in the spring. In some subspecies, though, mating occurs in the fall, and delayed implantation occurs. Females attract males by secreting pheromones from their skin. Once the male finds a female, he starts by moving his closed mouth along the female's body. Then, the male bites the female around her neck ring, maneuvering to align their bodies so sperm can be inserted into the female's vent. Females lay their eggs in loose, aerated soils under a rock or in a rotted log. Three to ten eggs are deposited in June or July and hatch in August or September. The egg is elongated with a white color contrasted by yellow ends. When hatched, juveniles are precocial and fend for themselves without parental care.

== Threats ==
One of the biggest threats the Key ring-necked snakes (Diadophis punctatus acricus) face is climate change. Native to the Florida Keys, the chain of low-level islands that make up the archipelago make the species highly vulnerable as rising sea levels impact their island habitat. They face storm surges and flooding events, which only expect to become more frequent as climate change worsens. Because of their small size and dependence on feeding off leaf litter prey, such as small invertebrates, these changes in climate directly impact food availability.

== Subspecies ==
The following 14 subspecies are recognized.

- D. p. acricus Paulson, 1966 — Key ring-necked snake
- D. p. amabilis (Baird & Girard, 1853) — Pacific ring-necked snake
- D. p. anthonyi (Van Denburgh & Slevin, 1942) — Todos Santos Island ring-necked snake
- D. p. arnyi (Kennicott, 1859) — prairie ring-necked snake
- D. p. dugesii (Villada, 1875) — Dugès' ring-necked snake
- D. p. edwardsii (Merrem, 1820) — northern ring-necked snake
- D. p. modestus (Bocourt, 1866) — San Bernardino ring-necked snake
- D. p. occidentalis (Blanchard, 1923) — northwestern ring-necked snake
- D. p. pulchellus (Baird & Girard, 1853) — coralbelly ring-necked snake
- D. p. punctatus (Linnaeus, 1766) — southern ring-necked snake
- D. p. regalis (Baird & Girard, 1853) — regal ring-necked snake
- D. p. similis (Blanchard, 1923) — San Diego ring-necked snake
- D. p. stictogenys (Cope, 1860) — Mississippi ring-necked snake
- D. p. vandenburgii (Blanchard, 1923) — Monterey ring-necked snake
