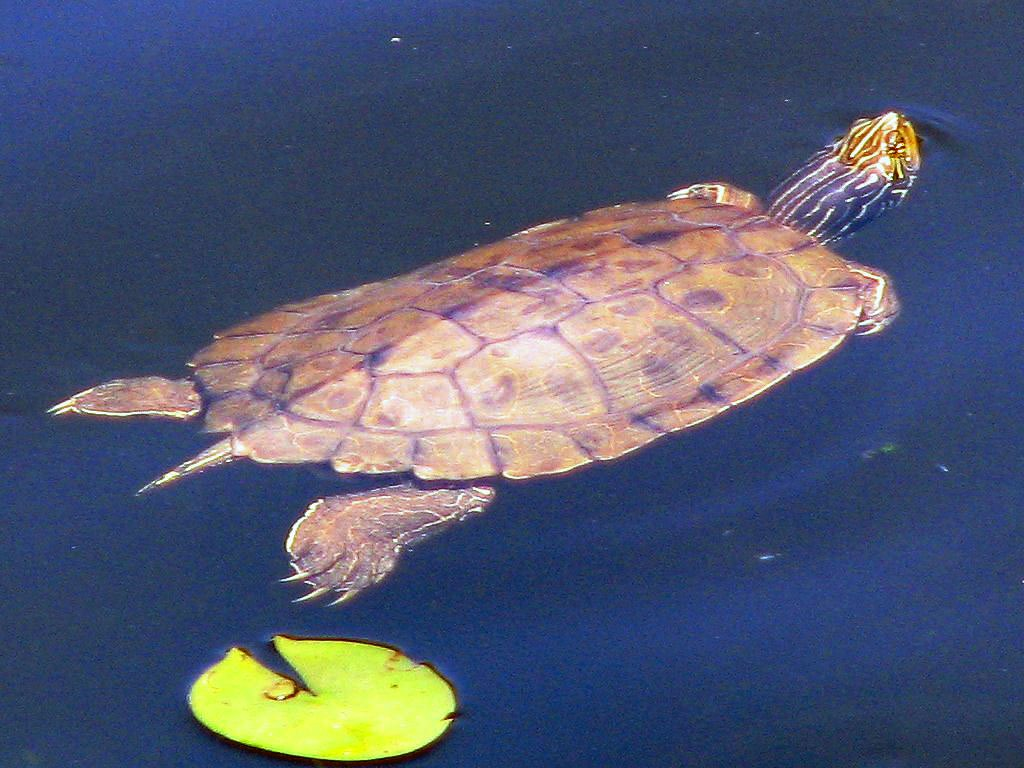
- Gatineau, Quebec

Conservation status
- Least Concern (IUCN 3.1)

Scientific classification
- Kingdom: Animalia
- Phylum: Chordata
- Class: Reptilia
- Order: Testudines
- Suborder: Cryptodira
- Family: Emydidae
- Genus: Graptemys
- Species: G. geographica

Binomial name
- Graptemys geographica (Lesueur, 1817)
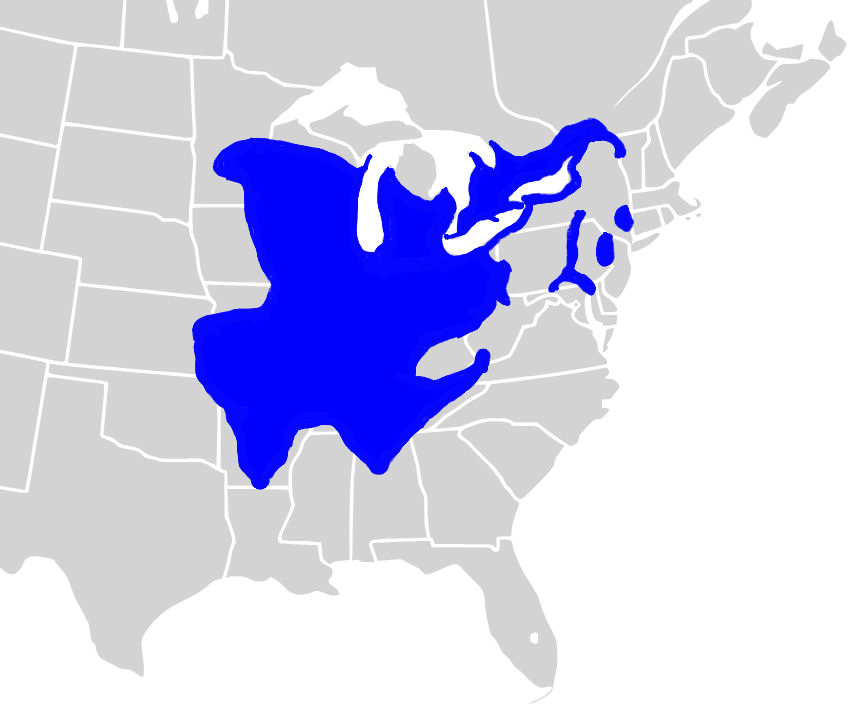
- Range map

Synonyms
- Testudo geographica Lesueur, 1817; Emys geographica Say, 1825; Terrapene geographica Bonaparte, 1831; Clemmys (Clemmys) geographica Fitzinger, 1835; Emys megacephala Holbrook, 1836; Graptemys geographica Agassiz, 1857; Malacoclemmys geographica Cope, 1875; Malacoclemmys geographicus Davis & Rice, 1883; Malaclemys georgraphica Hay, 1887 (ex errore); Malaclemys geographica Hurter, 1893; Malaclemmys geographicus McLain, 1899; Malaclemys geographicus Paulmier, 1902; Graptemys geographicus Siebenrock, 1909; Graptemys geographica Stejneger & Barbour, 1917

= Northern map turtle =

Species of turtle

The northern map turtle (Graptemys geographica), also known as the common map turtle, is an aquatic turtle in the family Emydidae. It is endemic to North America.

== Description ==
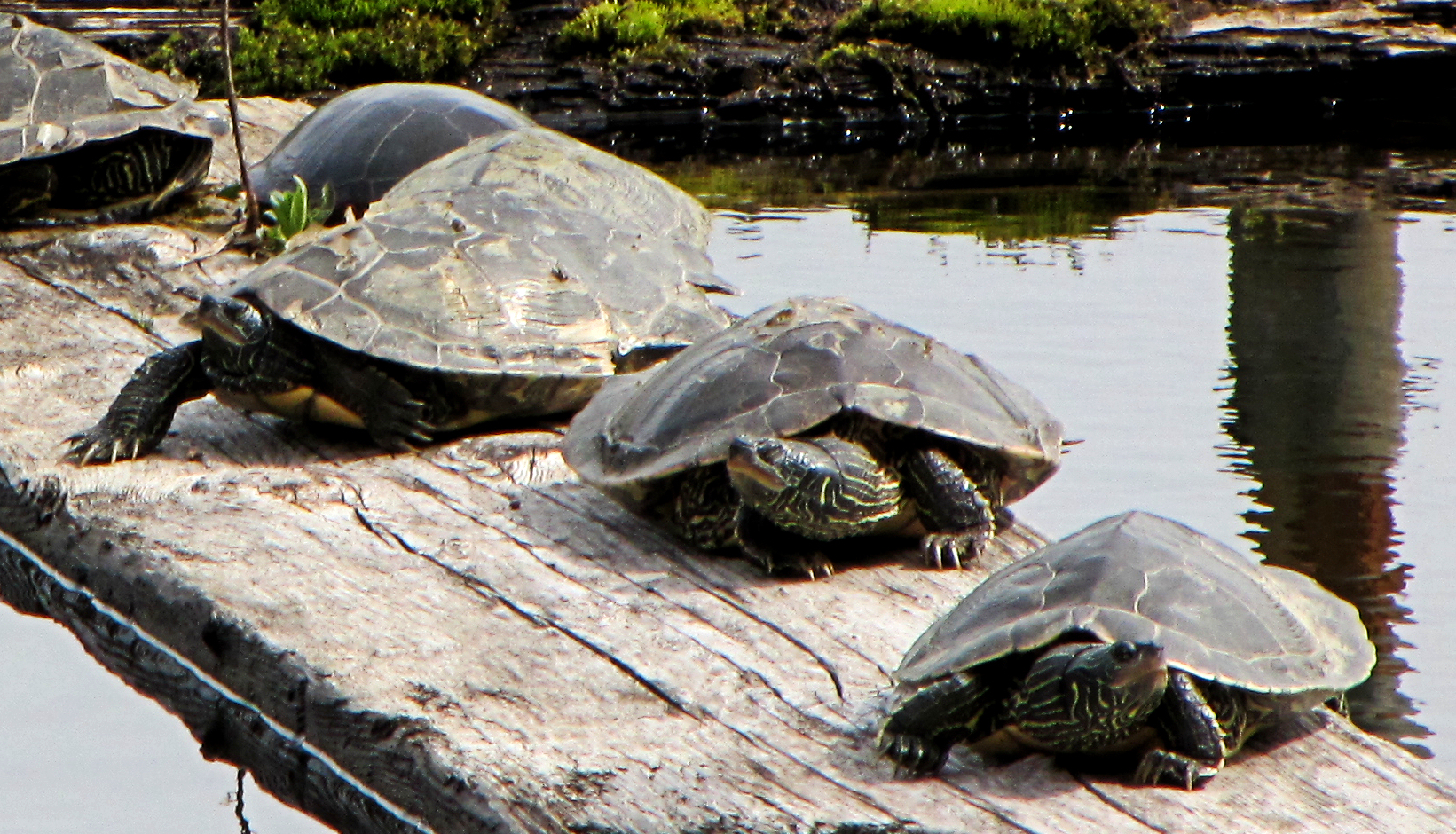
Five sunning with a midland painted turtle, Ottawa, Ontario

The northern map turtle gets both its common and scientific names from the markings on its carapace, which resemble contour lines on a map or chart. These lines are usually shades of yellow, tan, or orange, and are surrounded by dark borders, with the rest of the carapace being olive or greyish brown. However, the carapace markings tend to fade as the animal matures, and in older individuals are usually only visible when the shell is wet. The carapace has a hydrodynamic appearance and is broad with a moderately low keel. The rear of the carapace is flared and the rear marginals form serrations. The plastron is yellowish and is marked by a central dark blotch (plastral figure) that follows the sutures of the plastral scutes and fades with age so that many adults lack a pattern all together (i.e., the plastron is immaculate). The head, neck, limbs and tail are dark green with thin yellow stripes, and an oval or triangular spot is located behind each eye. Like other map turtles, this species exhibits extreme sexual size dimorphism; males are 10–16 cm (3.9–6.3 in) in carapace length and weigh between 150–400 g (5.3–14.1 oz), while females are 18–27 cm (7.1–10.6 in) in carapace length and weigh around 0.67–2.5 kg (1.5–5.5 lb). Females have a much wider head than males and this is associated with differences in feeding. Males have a narrower carapace with more distinct keel, narrower head, and a longer, thicker tail. Unlike females, the opening of the cloaca is beyond the rear edge of the carapace. Young map turtles have a pronounced dorsal keel. Hatchlings have a round greyish-brown carapace that is about 2.5 cm (0.98 in) long.

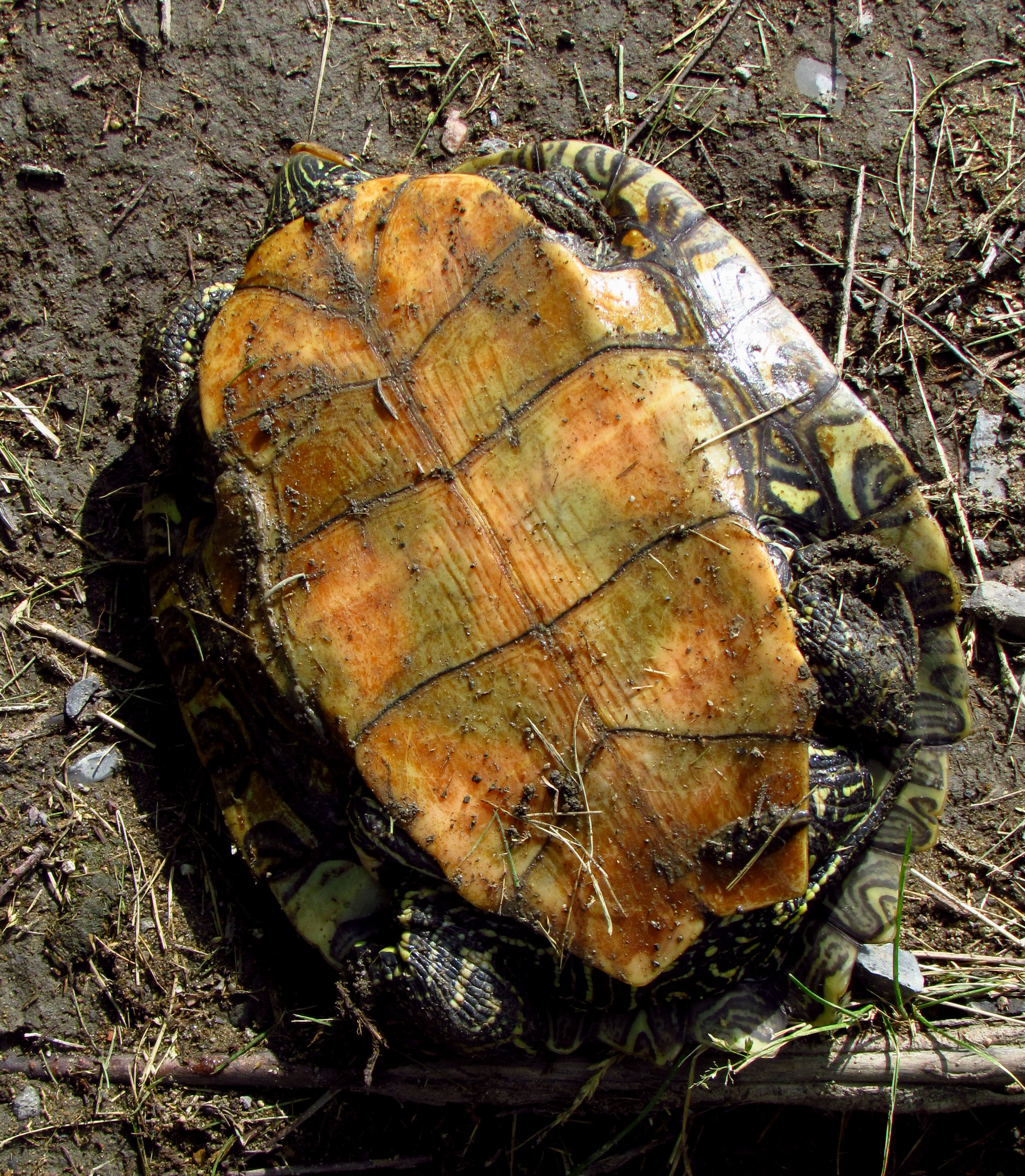
Adult plastron

== Distribution ==
Northern map turtles inhabit an area from south Quebec and Ontario to northern Vermont where it lives in the St. Lawrence River drainage basin. Its range extends west through the Great Lakes and into southern Wisconsin and eastern Minnesota, west of the Appalachians, south to Kansas and northwestern Georgia. A population has been found in Northeastern Mississippi. It also occurs in the Susquehanna River system in Pennsylvania and Maryland and the Delaware River. Also, a small European population occurs in the Czech Republic, which was formed from escaped or released turtles and their descendants. In the Czech Republic, this turtle is considered an alien species, but is threatened together with Czech native turtles, other reptiles and amphibians by a large population of another invasive turtle, Trachemys scripta elegans.

== Habitat ==
The northern map turtle inhabits ponds, rivers, and lakes. They prefer large bodies of water and areas with fallen trees and other debris for basking. These turtles are more often found in rivers than in lakes or ponds. They are found in larger rivers and lakes in the northern portion of their range but are more likely to live in smaller rocky rivers and streams in the south and west. Since they are turtles, naturally they need the sun to survive.

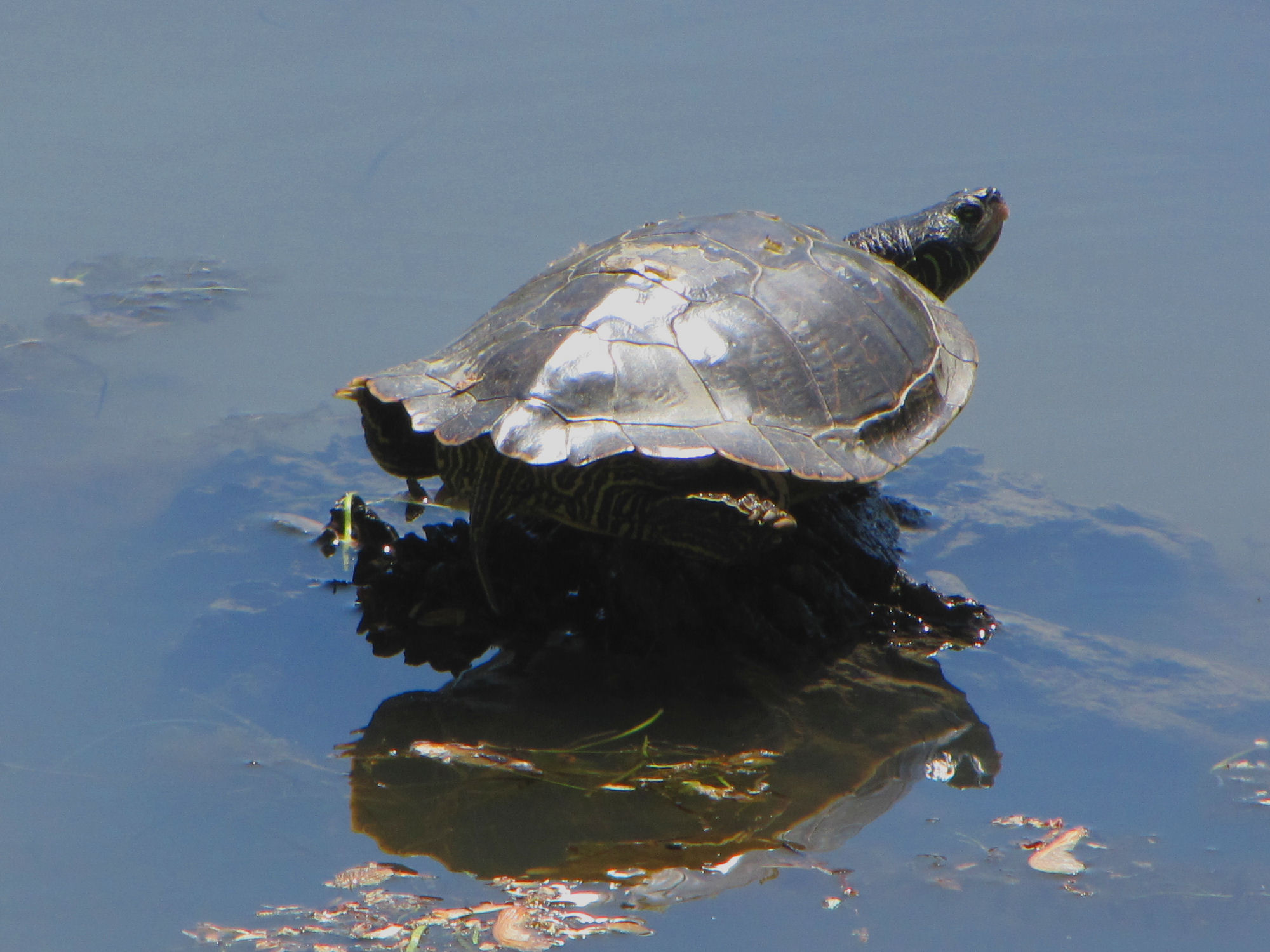
Basking on a sunny day

== Ecology and behaviour ==
This turtle is dormant November through April, depending on local climatic factors. Northern map turtles spend the winter under water and do not surface to breathe, especially when ice cover makes this impossible. Adults rest on the bottom or wedged underneath rocks or logs and often hibernate communally with other northern map turtles where they may remain somewhat active throughout the entirety of the winter.Hibernacula must be well oxygenated because, unlike some other turtle species such as painted turtles, map turtles need to absorb oxygen from the water to survive the winter. They typically bask in groups and are diurnal, meaning they are active exclusively in daylight hours. Northern map turtles are also quite shy and difficult to approach; they usually slip into the water and hide at the first hint of danger.

== Reproduction ==
Northern map turtles breed in the spring and fall. Most mating takes place in deep waters. The nesting period lasts from May to July. Unshaded sites with sandy soil are highly preferred. The female usually chooses well-drained areas for depositing the eggs. The nest cavity is dug with the hind feet. The size of the clutch is between six and 20. The eggs are oval, about 3.2 cm (1.3 in) long, and have a flexible shell. After the eggs are laid, the cavity is filled. They hatch after 50 to 70 days of incubation, and most hatchlings emerge in August to September. When a nest hatches late, the northern map turtle hatchlings have been known to overwinter in the nest. The female usually lays two or more clutches in one breeding season. The sexes of the young are determined by the temperature. At 25 °C (77 °F), incubation produces a majority of males, whereas 30 to 35 °C (86 to 95 °F) yields more females.

== Diet ==
Map turtles are more carnivorous than most other members of the family Emydidae, and this includes the northern map turtle. Adult females have wide heads, strong jaws and broad alveolar crushing surfaces in their mouths which they use to feed on molluscs, their primary prey, as well as insects and crayfish. Adult males are much smaller and have narrower heads and feed on smaller molluscs and insects. Like most other aquatic turtles, feeding always takes place in the water. In places where invasive molluscs such as zebra mussels and Asian clams (Corbicula fluminea) are abundant, they may become the most important food of female northern map turtles.

== Existing protection and conservation status ==
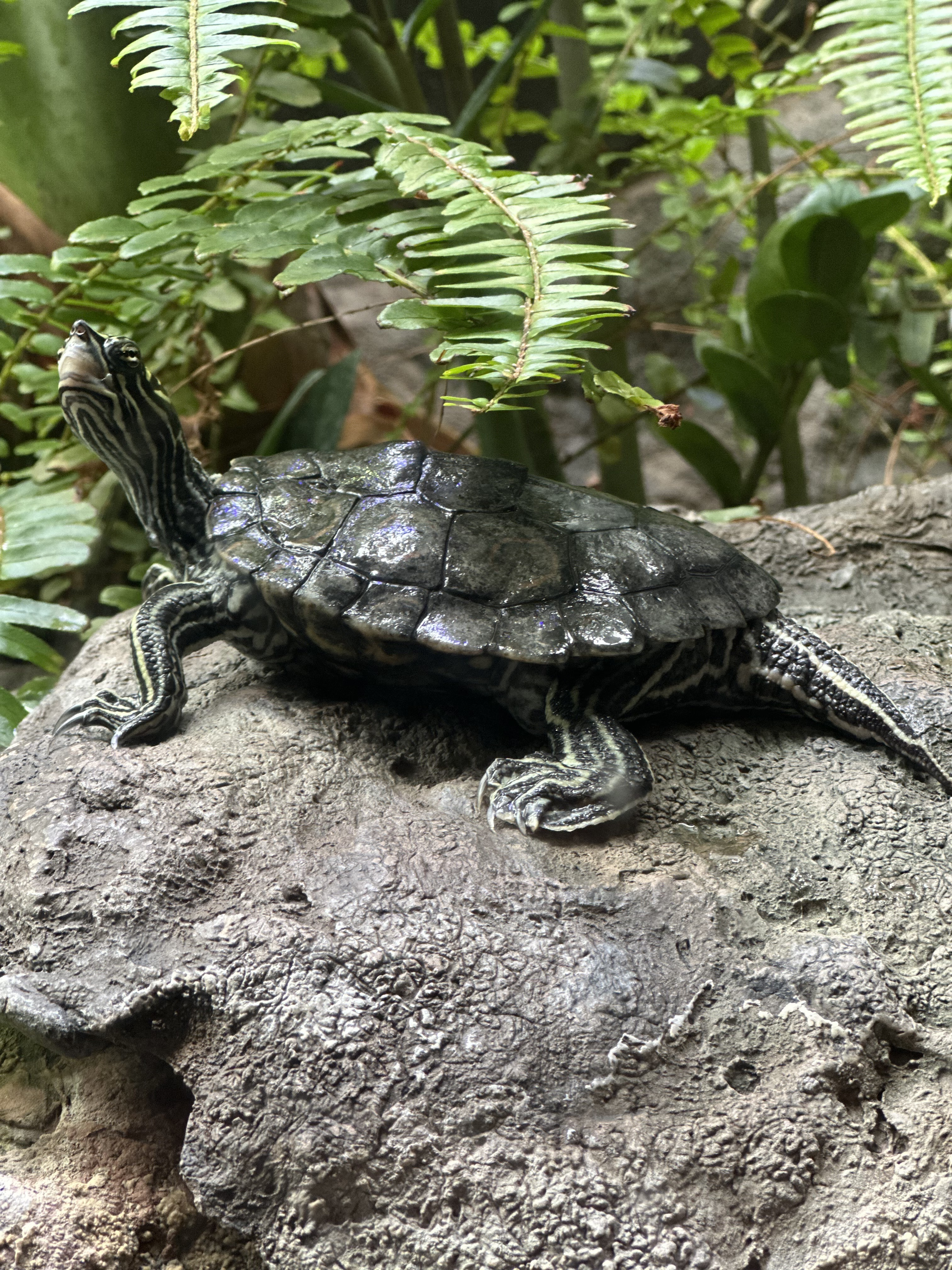
Northern map turtle at Shedd Aquarium in Chicago, Illinois

Map turtles are considered habitat specialists and may be replaced by a more tolerant species when their habitat is altered. The effects of human interference by way boating and recreation on shorelines are likely impeding the map turtle from re-establishing itself in natural areas. Thus, populations of Northern map turtles have probably declined across their entire natural range but they remain widespread and may be abundant in some locations. The species is classified as least concern by the IUCN.

=== United States ===
Collecting, keeping, and selling of northern map turtles is prohibited by Animals in Captivity regulations in nine states. It is considered endangered in Kansas, Kentucky, and Maryland.

=== Canada ===
Like most jurisdictions of the United States, Canada lists northern map turtles as a species of special concern. This means that they are being threatened by something but are not yet endangered. They are being watched carefully.
