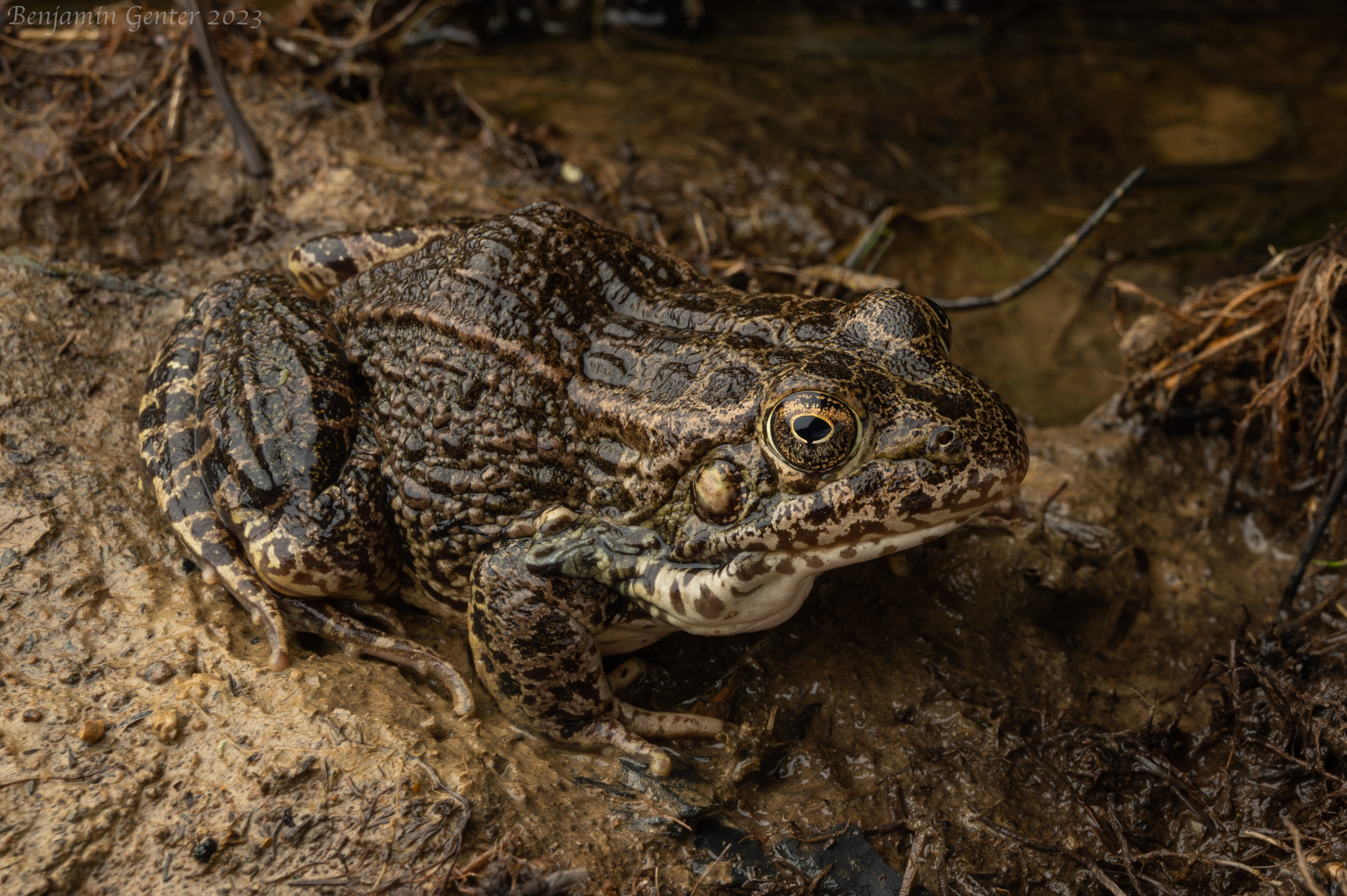

Conservation status
- Least Concern (IUCN 3.1)

- Apparently Secure (NatureServe)

Scientific classification
- Kingdom: Animalia
- Phylum: Chordata
- Class: Amphibia
- Order: Anura
- Family: Ranidae
- Genus: Lithobates
- Species: L. areolatus

Binomial name
- Lithobates areolatus (Baird & Girard, 1852)

Synonyms
- Rana circulosa Rice & Davis, 1878; Rana octoplicata Werner, 1893; Rana virescens areolata Cole & Barbour, 1906; Rana areolatus

= Crawfish frog =

Species of amphibian

The crawfish frog (Lithobates areolatus) is a medium-sized species of frog native to the prairies and grasslands of the central United States. It gets its name because it inhabits the burrows of crayfish for most of the year. They have defined golden or black circles all over their body.

== Description ==
The crawfish frog grows from 2.2 to 3.0 in (5.6 to 7.6 cm) in length. It ranges from yellow to brown in color, with a white ventral surface. The numerous dark brown spots on the back of L. areolatus each has a light-colored ring around it. It has a distinct skin fold on either side of its back, which are much more pronounced in males than females, and a relatively small tympanum.

== Behavior ==
Crawfish frogs are found primarily in association with prairie or grassland habitat, though they will also make use of pastures and overgrown fields. This species spends most of the year in association with a terrestrial crayfish burrow. Lithobates areolatus spends a substantial amount of time active and above ground even on hot summer days, but they never stray far from their burrow which serves as an important retreat from predators, a vital source of water, an escape from grassland fires, and a means to get below the frost line during winter. Crawfish frogs feed opportunistically on insects and other small invertebrates that pass by their burrow.

The crawfish frog breeds following mild, rainy weather in mid-March throughout most of its range (breeding occurs much earlier in the southern portion of its distribution). During this time, males seek out ephemeral ponds and wetlands that lack fish and begin calling. The low-frequency call may carry over a mile, drawing females in from the surrounding area. Once the females arrive, amplexus is likely to take place and the females deposit up to 7,000 eggs at a time in large, globular masses. The eggs hatch in an average of 12 days, and the tadpoles metamorphose into froglets within three or four months. The newly metamorphosed juvenile frogs must quickly seek out a crayfish burrow to occupy to avoid predation. Crawfish frogs become sexually mature at two to three years of age and may live up to seven years or more in the wild. Adult crawfish frogs exhibit burrow fidelity and will use the same burrow for consecutive years.

== Geographic range ==
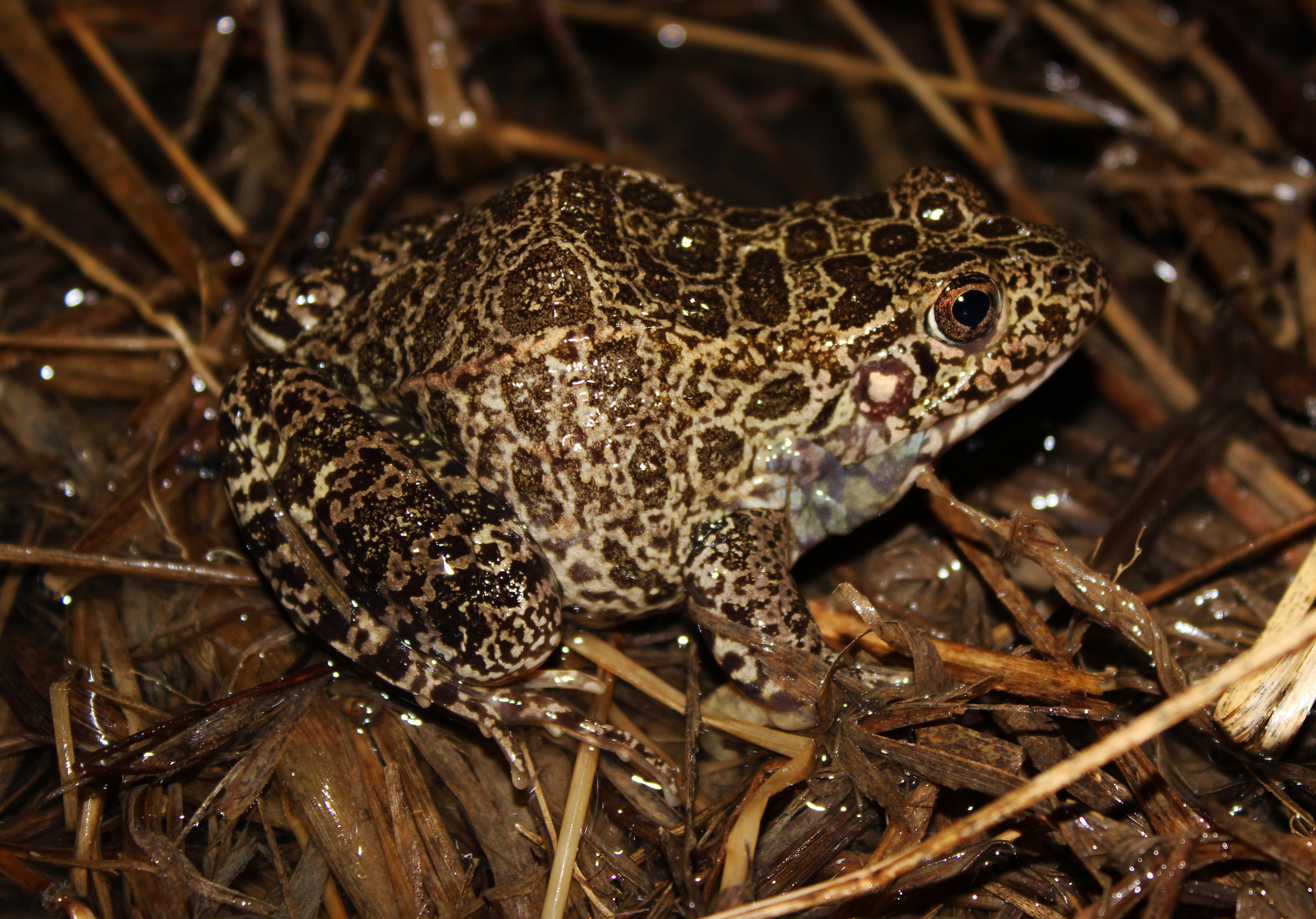
Northern crawfish frog, L. a. circulosus

The crawfish frog is found in portions of central and southern United States, from Indiana west to Kansas, south to Texas, and east to Alabama. This species is largely associated with former prairie regions where crawfish burrows are found, but with the effects of habitat loss along with urbanization, many populations have been extirpated.

During the early 2000s, a sizable and geographically disjunct crawfish frog population was discovered at Big Oaks National Wildlife Refuge in southeastern Indiana. In 2016 a sizable population was documented in Sumter County, Alabama.

A new county record was added in 2017 in Perry County, Arkansas within the Ouachita Mountains. See Notes below.

== Conservation status ==
The crawfish frog is listed as least concern by the IUCN Red List of Threatened Species, and is listed as endangered in Iowa (where it has likely been extirpated) and Indiana. According to the IUCN Red List, habitat loss is the biggest threat to this species, though disease (chytridiomycosis) and competitive pressure from other anurans have also been identified as potential stresses.

Conservation efforts are focused on protecting L. areolatus habitat. Crawfish frogs can travel more than 1 km between their primary burrow and breeding ponds during the breeding season, indicating that protected regions should be large enough to encompass the migratory distances covered during breeding season. Within these protected areas, mowing and heavy vehicle use should be limited during the warm season when frogs are active. Tilling practices are thought to be an acute threat to crawfish frogs due to the destruction of burrows; thus disking and plowing should be reduced or avoided entirely in areas occupied by the species. Additional conservation strategies include genetic management. This method of conservation is unlikely to take place until crawfish frog populations decrease significantly. If genetic management is required, recent studies have shown that genetic diversity within L. areolatus populations is strong and should be enough to maintain fitness.

== Subspecies ==
The two subspecies of crawfish frog (L. areolatus) are:

- Southern crawfish frog, L. a. areolatus (Baird & Girard, 1852)
- Northern crawfish frog, L. a. circulosus (Davis and Rice, 1883)

== Notes ==
LITHOBATES AREOLATUS CIRCULOSUS (Northern Crawfish Frog). USA: ARKANSAS: Perry Co.: Off Cherry Hill Loop Rd. (Co. Rd. 42), ca. 1.6 km S of St. Hwy 60 (34.967367ºN, 92.939558ºW; WGS 84, elev. 96.93 m) 23 February 2017. Anthony Holt. Verified by Christopher S. Thigpen. Arkansas State University Museum of Zoology (ASUMZ 33611). Calling adult male collected by hand from a tractor tire rut in a cattle pasture. New county record (Trauth et al. 2004. The Amphibians and Reptiles of Arkansas. University of Arkansas Press, Fayetteville, Arkansas. 421 pp.). Adds an additional record within the Fourche Mountain subdivision of the Ouachita Mountains.
