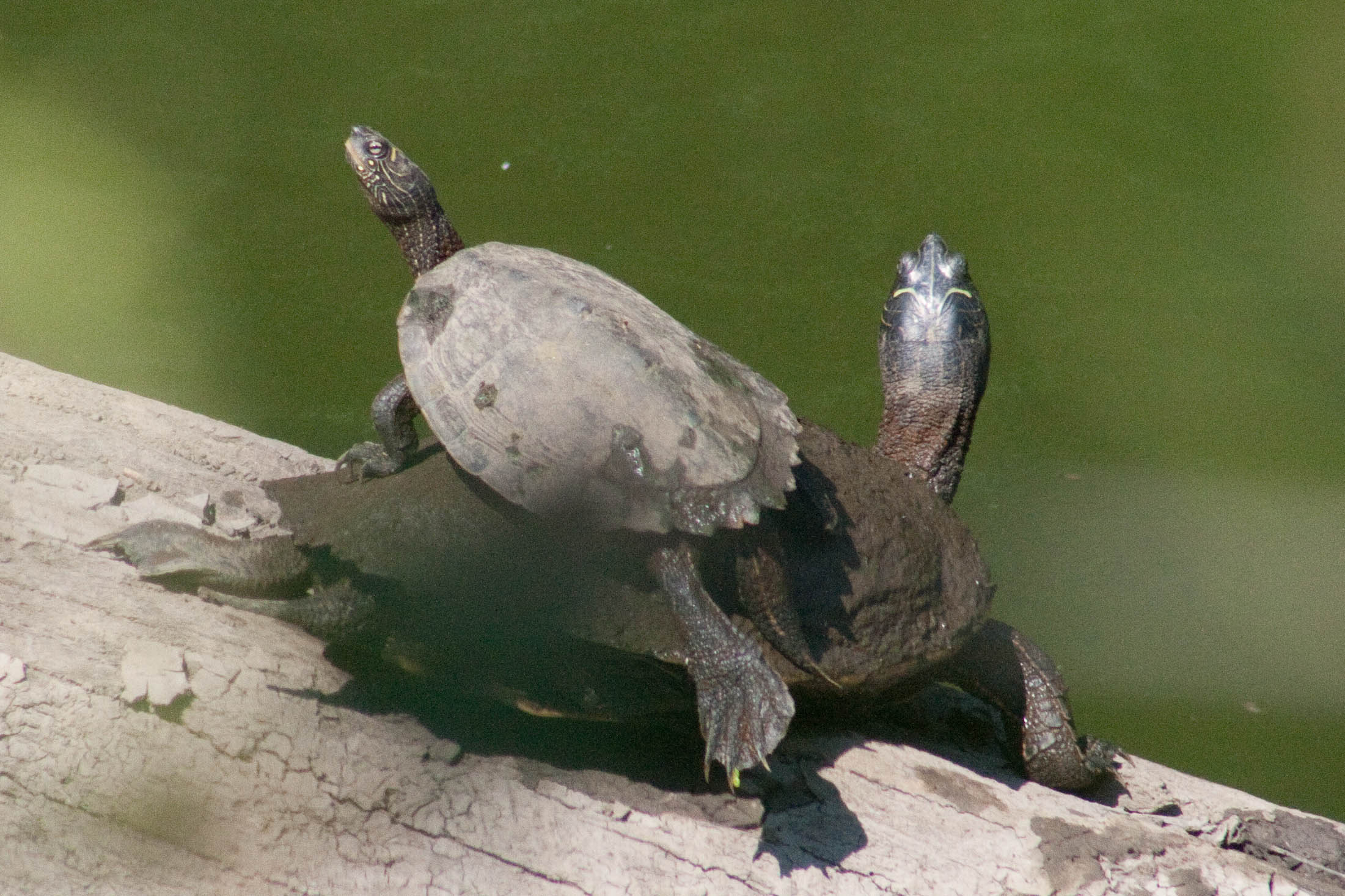

Conservation status
- Least Concern (IUCN 3.1)

Scientific classification
- Kingdom: Animalia
- Phylum: Chordata
- Class: Reptilia
- Order: Testudines
- Suborder: Cryptodira
- Family: Emydidae
- Genus: Graptemys
- Species: G. pseudogeographica

Binomial name
- Graptemys pseudogeographica (Gray, 1831)

Subspecies
- G. p. pseudogeographica (Gray, 1831), false map turtle; G. p. kohnii (Baur, 1890), Mississippi map turtle
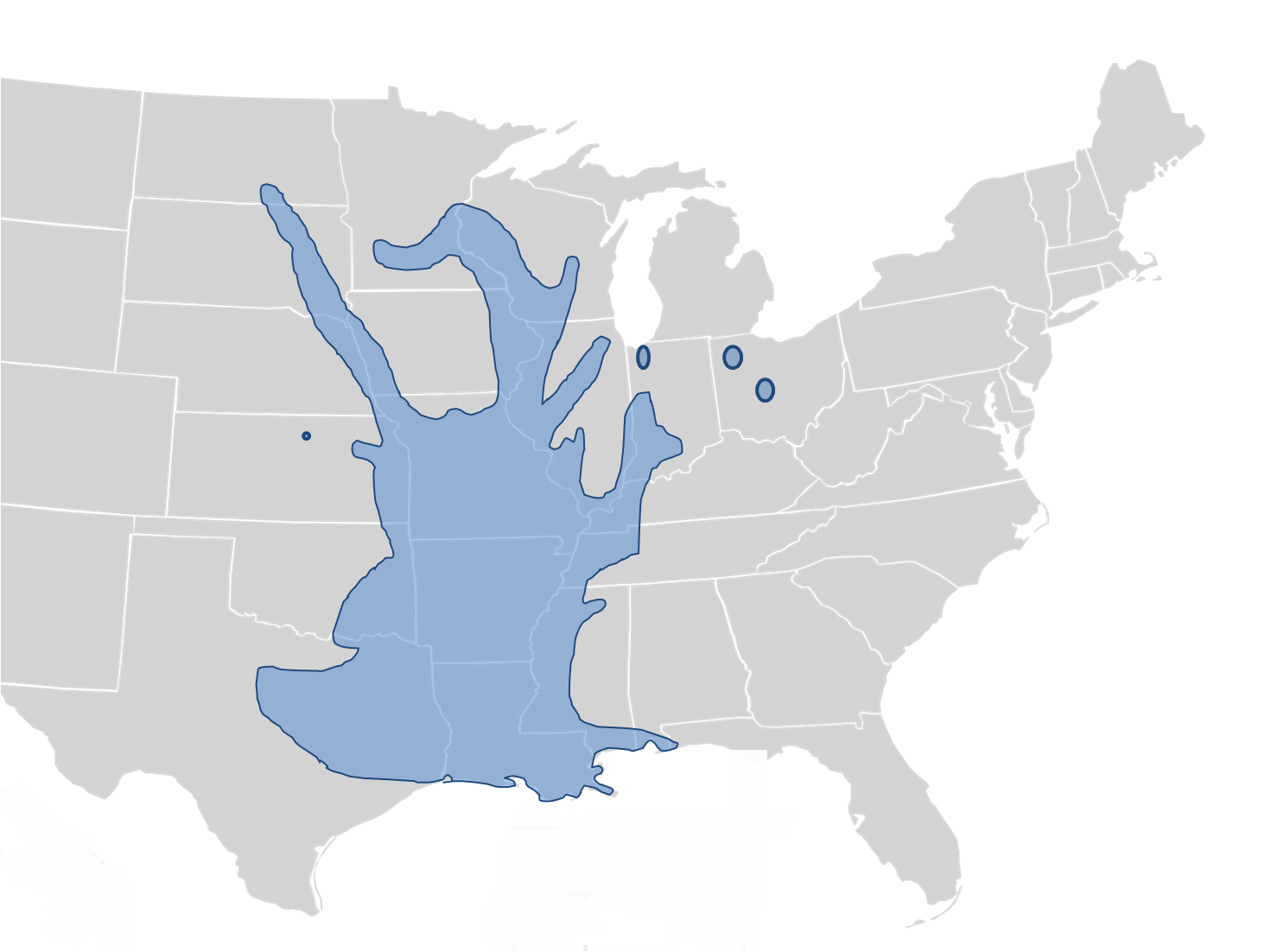
- Range map

Synonyms
- List: Emys pseudogeographica Gray, 1831; Emys lesueurii Gray, 1831; Graptemys lesueurii — Agassiz, 1857; Clemmys pseudogeographica — Strauch, 1862; Graptemys pseudogeographica — Gray, 1863; Malacoclemmys pseudogeographicus — Cope, 1875; Malacoclemmys lesueuri Yarrow, 1883 (ex errore); Malacoclemmys pseudographicus [N.S.] Davis & [F.L.] Rice, 1883 (ex errore); Malacoclemmys lesueurii — Boulenger, 1889; Malaclemys pseudogeographica — O.P. Hay, 1892; Malaclemys pseudogeographicus — Paulmier, 1902; Graptemys pseudogeographicus — Siebenrock, 1909; Graptemys pseudogeographica pseudogeographica — Stejneger & Barbour, 1917; Malaclemys pseudogeographica pseudogeographica — Cochran & Goin, 1970; Graptemys pseudogeoraphica Anan'eva et al., 1988 (ex errore); Graptemys pseudogeographica pseudogeographica — Crother, 2000

= False map turtle =

Species of turtle

The false map turtle (Graptemys pseudogeographica) is a species of turtle endemic to the United States. It is a common pet species. Two subspecies are recognized, including the nominotypical subspecies described here.

== Subspecies ==
- Nominotypical subspecies: G. p. pseudogeographica (Gray, 1831) – False map turtle
- G. p. kohnii (Baur, 1890) – Kohn's map turtle, Mississippi map turtle

== Distribution ==
The false map turtle lives in large streams of the Missouri and Mississippi River systems, ranging from Ohio, Indiana, Illinois, Wisconsin, Minnesota, through the Dakotas southward to southwestern Alabama, southern and western Mississippi, and Louisiana. The false map turtle also lives in several other river systems of Southwest Louisiana and East Texas.

== Description ==
Also known as a "sawback" turtle, the turtle has a carapace featuring a vertebral row of low spines, and is serrated on the posterior rim. The carapace is olive to brown in color with light yellowish markings with dark borders, often with a dark mark on each scute. The plastron color varies from cream to yellow and is patterned with dark lines along the seams in juveniles. The body color of the false map turtle is grayish brown to blackish and is marked with light brown, yellow, or whitish stripes. The eye can be brown, light yellow, white, or green and is crossed with a dark bar. There can be a distinct "L" mark just behind each eye. Narrow hooked marks behind the eye fuse with dorsal lines on the head and neck. Also, small light-colored spots occur below the eye and on the chin.

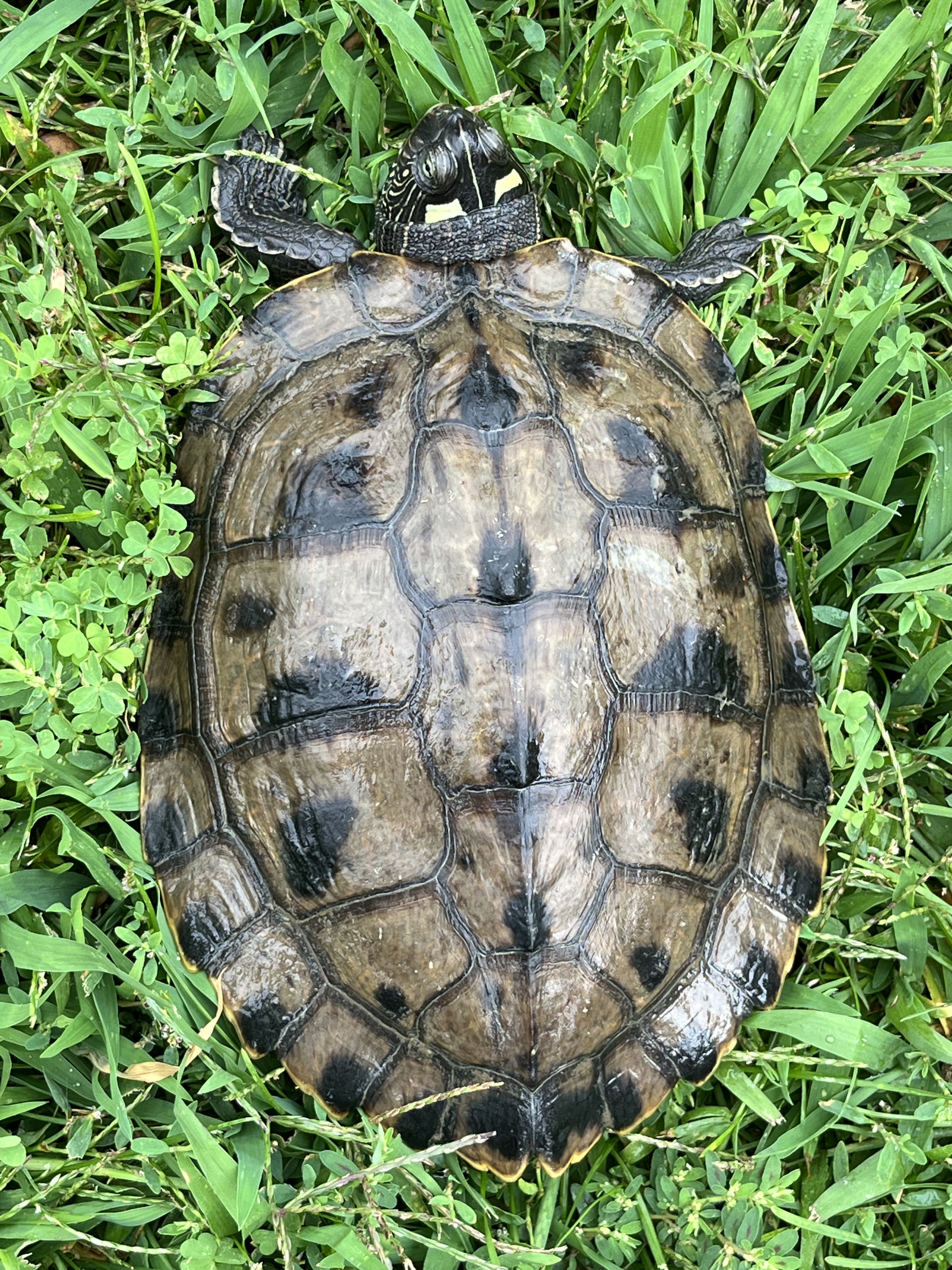
Dorsal view, showing bright "L" above eyes

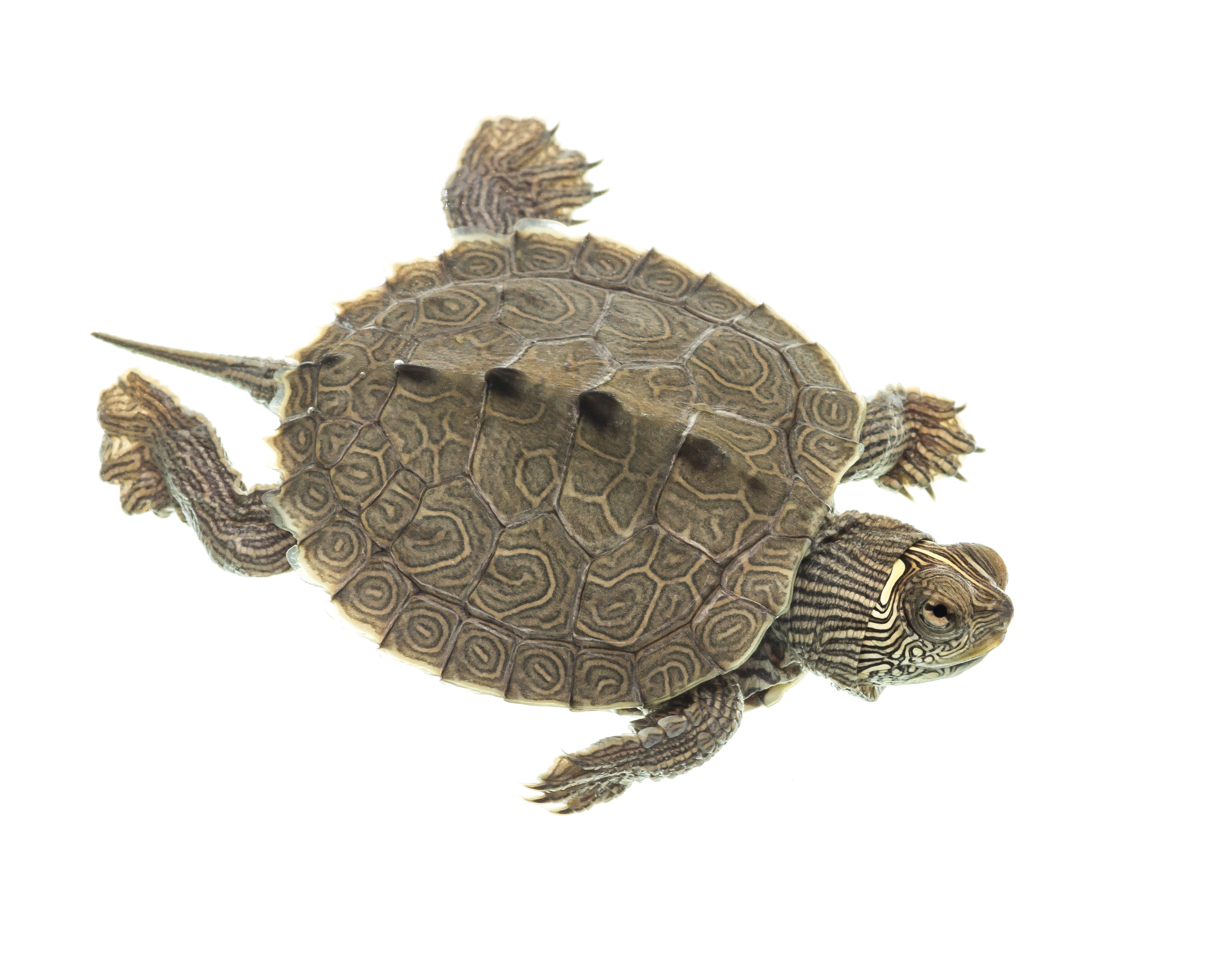
Juvenile

== Conservation status ==
In the Midwest, the false map turtle is a species of special interest in Ohio, and is threatened in South Dakota.

== Behavior ==
Map turtles of all kinds are avid baskers, spending many hours during the day in the sun. When with other turtles, they also are very communal, sharing space and using each other for predator-watching, increasing the odds of surviving an attack.

== Ecology ==
The false map turtle is a strong swimmer and prefers rivers and large creeks with moderate currents, containing aquatic vegetation, as well as snags or floating logs. They are also comfortable in deep and swift water. The turtles are present in oxbow lakes and sloughs, but are absent from lakes, ponds, or small streams. Basking is important to these turtles, and they may even be found on steep, slippery snags.

== Threats and management issues ==
A variety of threats face this species, including the destruction of nests of eggs by animals and insects, falling victim to gill nets, and being shot. False map turtles, much like red-eared sliders (Trachemys scripta elegans), have also been collected for the pet trade.

== Gallery ==
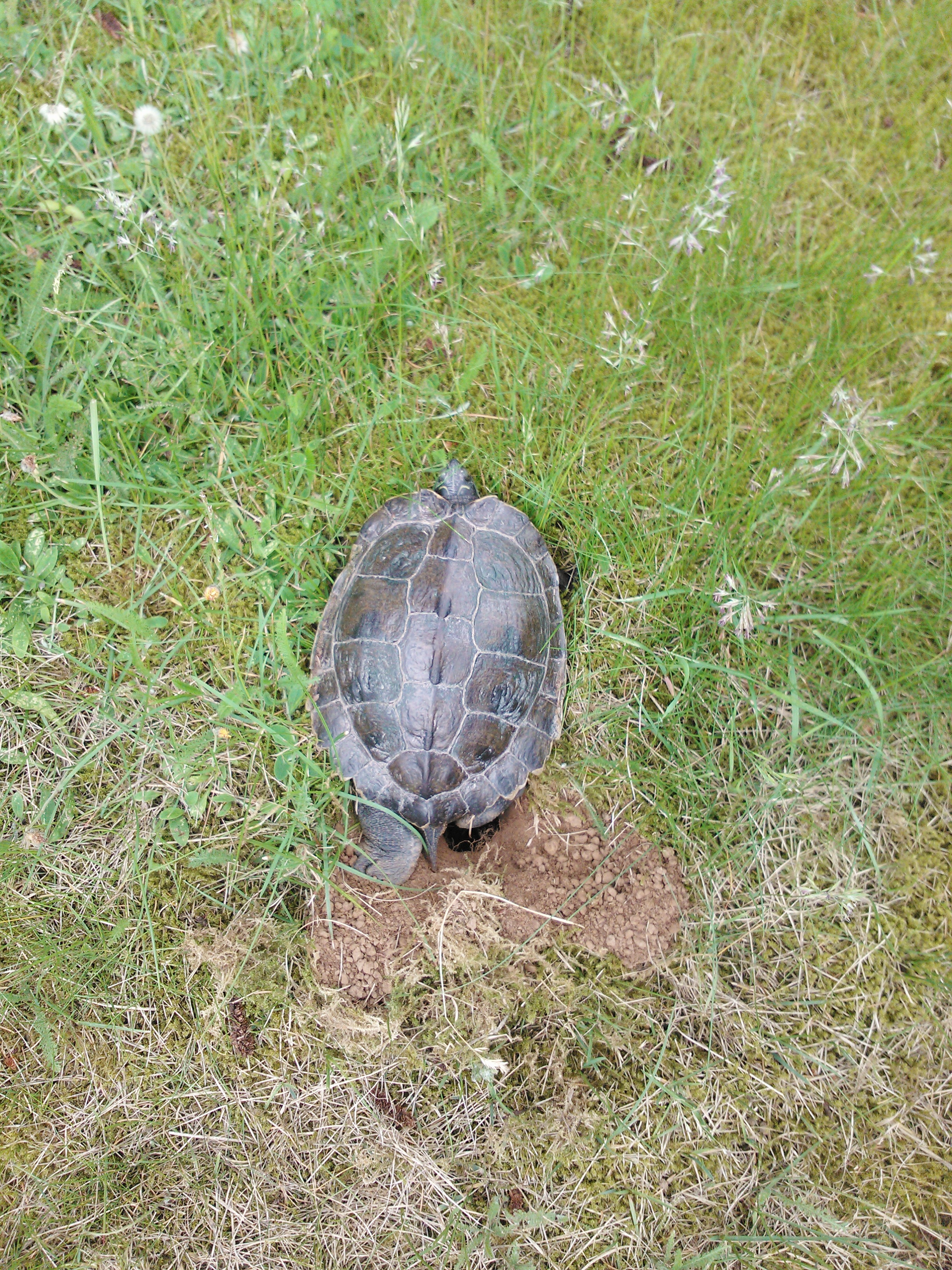
Clutch preparation of a breeding false map turtle on a meadow

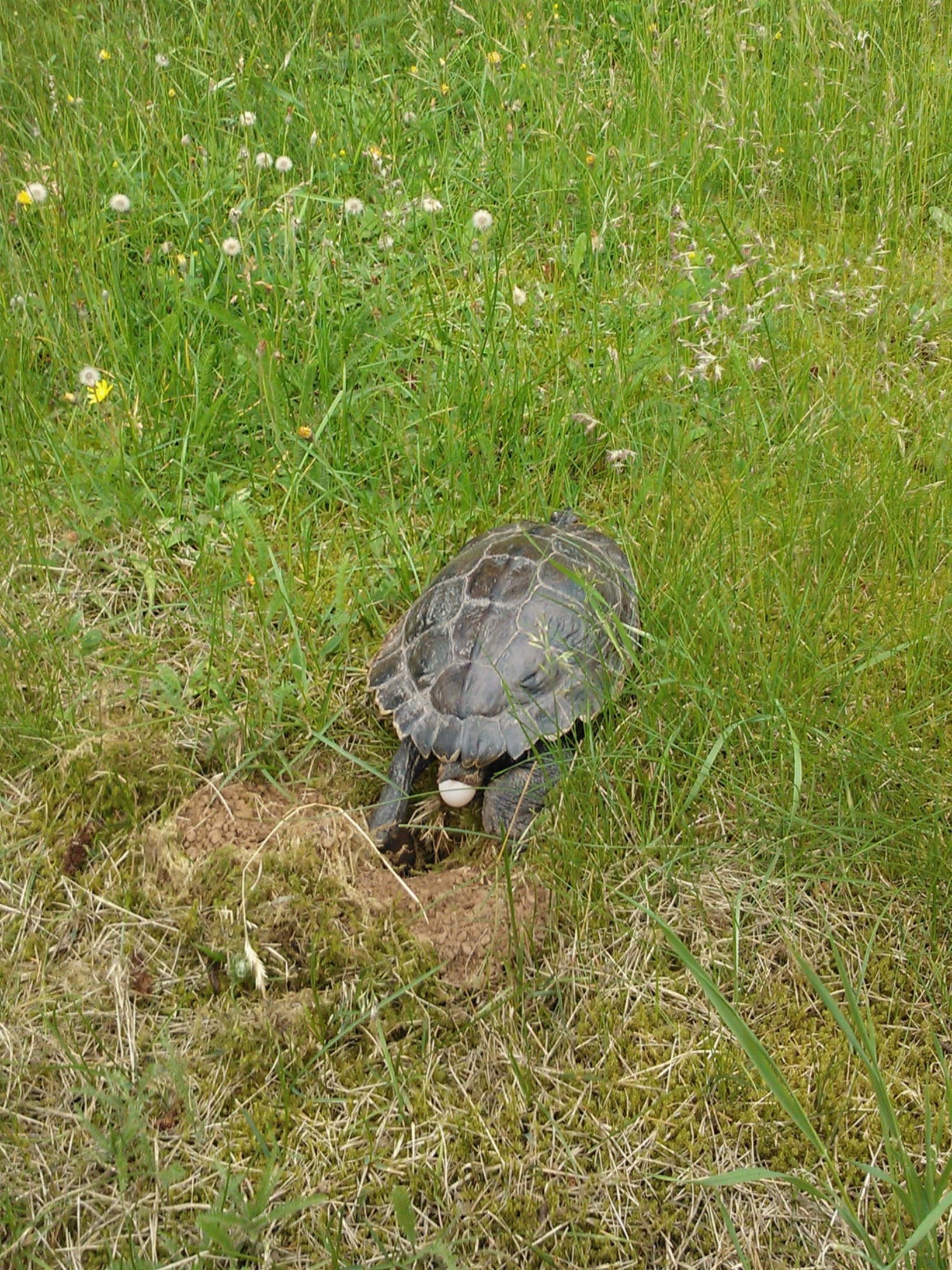
Same turtle during oviposition
