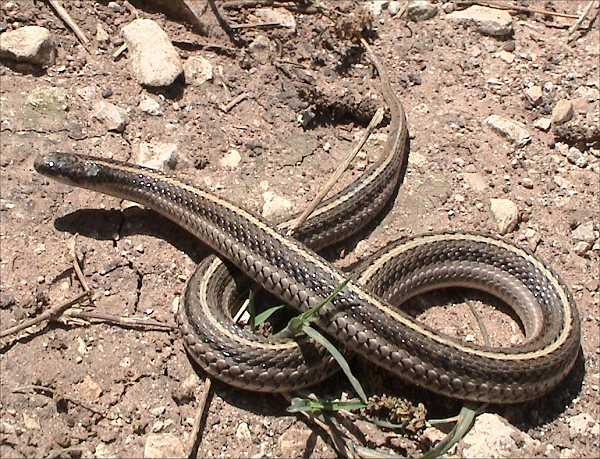
- Tropidoclonion lineatum, lined snake

Conservation status
- Least Concern (IUCN 3.1)

Scientific classification
- Kingdom: Animalia
- Phylum: Chordata
- Class: Reptilia
- Order: Squamata
- Suborder: Serpentes
- Family: Colubridae
- Subfamily: Natricinae
- Genus: Tropidoclonion; Cope, 1860
- Species: T. lineatum

Binomial name
- Tropidoclonion lineatum (Hallowell, 1856)

Synonyms
- Microps lineatus Hallowell, 1856; Storeria lineata — Cope, 1860; Ischnognathus lineatus — Boulenger, 1893; Tropidoclonium lineatum — Cope, 1900; Tropidoclonion lineatum — Stejneger & Barbour, 1917

= Tropidoclonion =

Genus of snakes

Tropidoclonion is a genus of snake in the subfamily Natricinae of the family Colubridae. The genus is monotypic, containing the sole species Tropidoclonion lineatum, commonly known as the lined snake. The species is native to the central United States.

== Common names ==
Additional common names for Tropidoclonion lineatum include common snake, dwarf garter snake, grass snake, line snake, ribbon snake, streaked snake, striped snake, and swamp snake.

== Subspecies ==
Four subspecies are recognized as being valid, including the nominotypical subspecies.

- Tropidoclonion lineatum annectens Ramsey, 1953 – central lined snake
- Tropidoclonion lineatum lineatum (Hallowell, 1856) – northern lined snake
- Tropidoclonion lineatum mertensi H.M. Smith, 1965 – Mertens' lined snake
- Tropidoclonion lineatum texanum Ramsey, 1953 – Texas lined snake

Nota bene: A trinomial authority in parentheses indicates that the subspecies was originally described in a genus other than Tropidoclonion.

== Etymology ==
The subspecific name, mertensi, is in honor of German herpetologist Robert Mertens.

== Geographic distribution ==
The lined snake is found throughout the central United States from Illinois to Colorado to Texas.

== Habitat ==
The preferred natural habitats of Tropidoclonion lineatum are savanna, shrubland, and grassland areas with soft, moist soils, but it is also found in disturbed and artificial habitats such as city backyards, vacant lots, and trash dumps.

== Description ==
The lined snake is olive green to brown with a distinctive tan or yellow stripe running down the middle of the back from head to tail. It has similar stripes, one down each side on scale rows 2 and 3. On the belly, it has a double row of clean-cut black half-moon spots running down the middle. It has a narrow head and small eyes.

Adult size is typically less than 35 cm (14 inches) in total length (tail included). However, maximum recorded total length is 53 cm (21 in).

The keeled dorsal scales are arranged in 19 rows at midbody. There are only 5 or 6 upper labials.

== Behavior ==
The lined snake is terrestrial and semifossorial, spending most of its time hiding under rocks, leaf litter, logs, or buried in the soil.

== Diet ==
The majority of the diet of Tropidoclonion lineatum consists of earthworms.

== Reproduction ==
The lined snake is ovoviviparous, the young being born in August. The average brood is seven or eight. Each newborn juvenile measures 10–12 cm (4–4¾ in.) in total length at birth.
