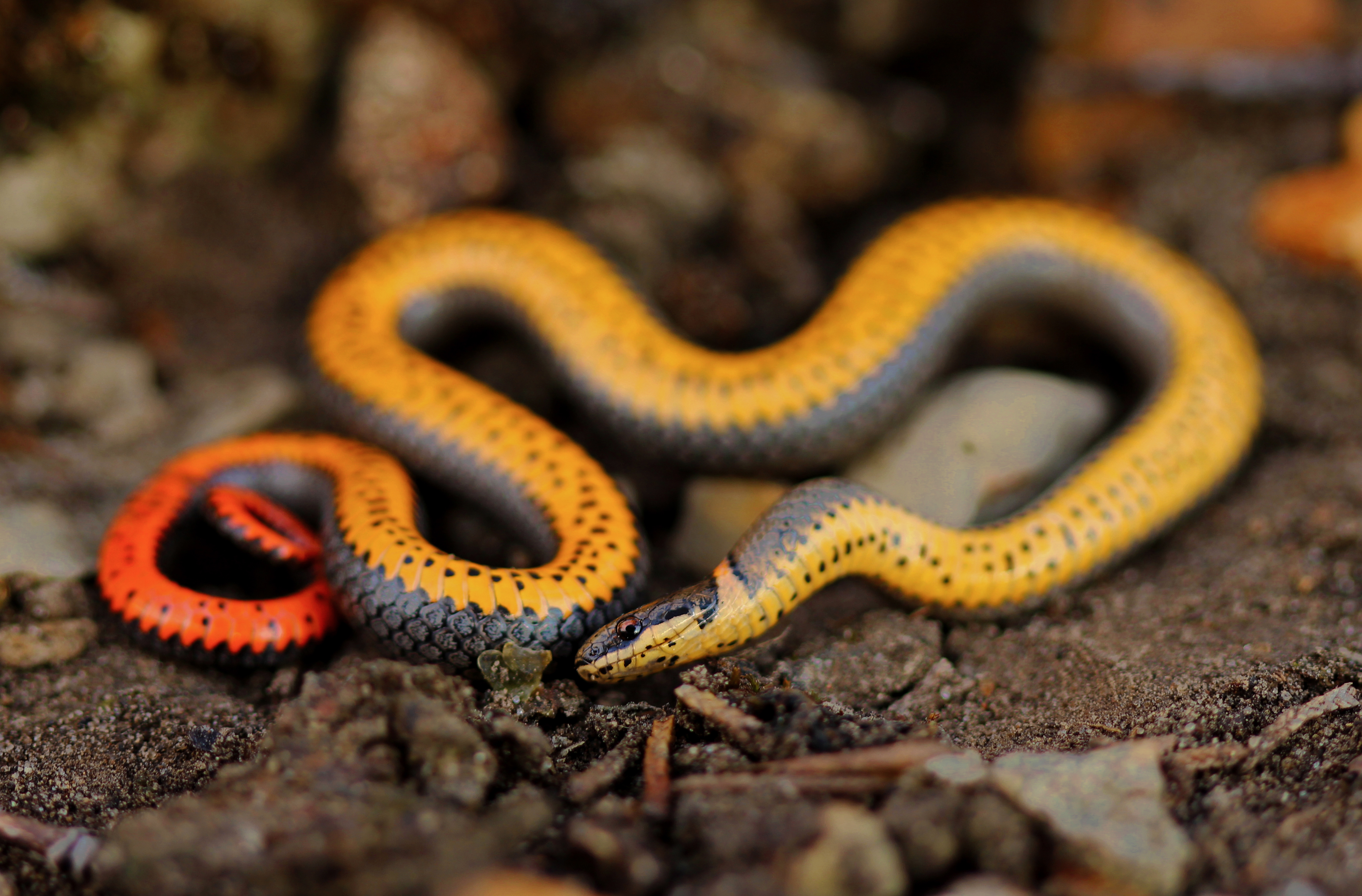
- Prairie ringneck snake

Scientific classification
- Kingdom: Animalia
- Phylum: Chordata
- Class: Reptilia
- Order: Squamata
- Suborder: Serpentes
- Family: Colubridae
- Genus: Diadophis
- Species: D. punctatus
- Subspecies: D. p. arnyi

Trinomial name
- Diadophis punctatus arnyi Kennicott, 1859

Synonyms
- Diadophis arnyi Kennicott, 1859; Diadophis regalis arnyi — Cope, 1900; Diadophis punctatus arnyi — Schmidt & Davis, 1941

= Diadophis punctatus arnyi =

Subspecies of snake

Diadophis punctatus arnyi, also known commonly as the prairie ringneck snake, is a subspecies of small, thin snake in the family Dipsadidae. The subspecies is native to the Midwestern United States.

== Etymology ==
The subspecific name, arnyi, is in honor of Samuel Arny, who collected the type specimen.

== Geographic range ==
D. p. arnyi is very common within its range and can be found almost anywhere in Midwest North America, i.e., Iowa, Kansas, Missouri and northwestern Arkansas to South Dakota, Oklahoma and Texas.

== Description ==
D. p. arnyi has a black-grey head, a grey body, and an orange ring around its neck. The ring does not extend toward the underside. The underside is yellow for a third of the body, orange for another third, and red for the last third. The belly also has black flecks along it. This snake has a blunt head, a tiny mouth, and small eyes. Anteriorly the dorsal scales are usually in 17 rows (other eastern subspecies have 15 rows). A mature prairie ringneck grows to about 25–36 cm (9.8–14.2 in) in total length (including tail), record 42 cm (16 1/2 in).

== Diet and behavior ==
D. p. arnyi eats insects, frogs, salamanders, other snakes, lizards, and newborn rodents. It uses a weak venom (not harmful to humans) in the saliva in its mouth to immobilize its prey. It also uses constriction.

When approached, the snake's first intent is to flee. It is usually a slow snake, so it can be caught quickly. When picked up, it tries to escape but rarely bites (although it does happen). It may also twist its brightly colored tail and lie on its back to draw attention away from its head.

== Habitats ==
The prairie ringneck snake (as its name suggests) lives in or near prairies and can often be found sunbathing or slithering out in the open. It can also be found under old logs, rocks, pieces of wood and sheets of tin. It likes to live under dead leaves and foliage in the woods, and in grasses in the prairie.

== Reproduction ==
From June to early August, adult females of D. p. arnyi lay 1 to 7 eggs (average 4). The eggs are on average 27 mm (1.1 in) long by 7 mm (1/4 in) wide. After being laid, the eggs increase in size until hatching. Hatching occurs after about 60 days. The hatchlings are around 100 mm (3.9 in) in total length, and resemble adults except with a bluish cast dorsally.

== Brumation and aestivation ==
D. p. arnyi will aestivate in the summer if the temperature is too hot and brumate in the winter when the weather is too cold. This is because the snake is an ectotherm (that is, cold-blooded) and needs to stay warm enough or cool enough to survive. For this reason it can be seen sunbathing when the temperature is cool.
