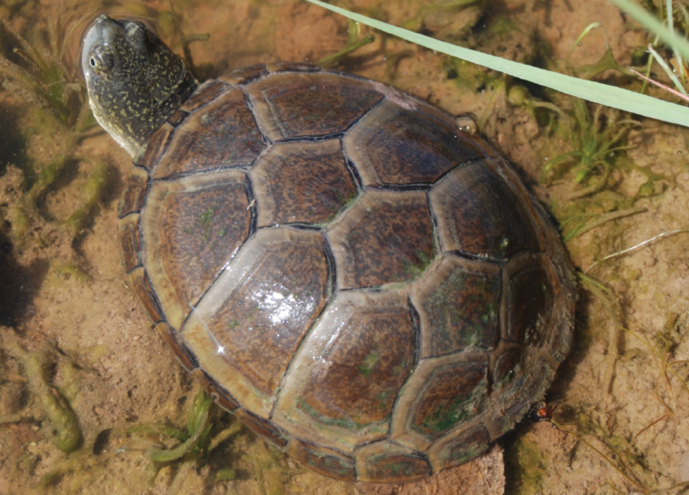
- In the Chihuahuan Desert, Texas

Conservation status
- Least Concern (IUCN 3.1)

Scientific classification
- Kingdom: Animalia
- Phylum: Chordata
- Class: Reptilia
- Order: Testudines
- Suborder: Cryptodira
- Family: Kinosternidae
- Genus: Kinosternon
- Species: K. flavescens

Binomial name
- Kinosternon flavescens (Agassiz, 1857)

Synonyms
- List: Cinosternon flavescens Agassiz, 1857; Platythyra flavescens — Agassiz, 1857; Cinosternum flavescens — Agassiz, 1857; Kinosternum flavescens — Cope, 1892; Kinosternon flavescens — Stone, 1903; Kinosternon flavescens flavescens — Hartweg, 1938; Kinosternon flavescens spooneri P.W. Smith, 1951; Platythyra flavenscens [sic] Raun & Gehlbach, 1972 (ex errore); Kinosternon spooneri — Collins, 1991

= Yellow mud turtle =

Species of turtle

The yellow mud turtle (Kinosternon flavescens), also commonly known as the yellow-necked mud turtle, is a species of mud turtle in the family Kinosternidae. The species is endemic to the Central United States and Mexico.

== Distribution ==
- Northeastern Mexico: Chihuahua, Coahuila, Nuevo León, and Tamaulipas.
- Midwestern and Southwestern United States: Arizona, Colorado, Illinois, Iowa, Kansas, Missouri, Nebraska, New Mexico, Oklahoma, and Texas.

Its current presence is uncertain in Veracruz (Mexico) and Arkansas (United States).

== Description ==
The yellow mud turtle is a small, olive-colored turtle. Both the common name, yellow mud turtle, and the specific name, flavescens (Latin: yellow), refer to the yellow-colored areas on the throat, head, and sides of the neck. The bottom shell (plastron) is yellow to brown with two hinges, allowing the turtle to close each end separately. The male's tail has a blunt spine on the end, but the female's tail does not.

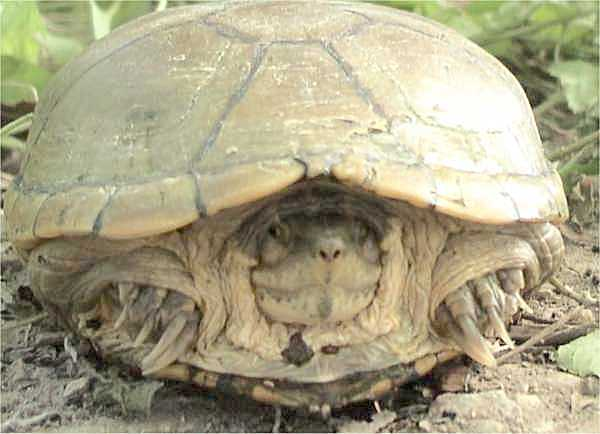

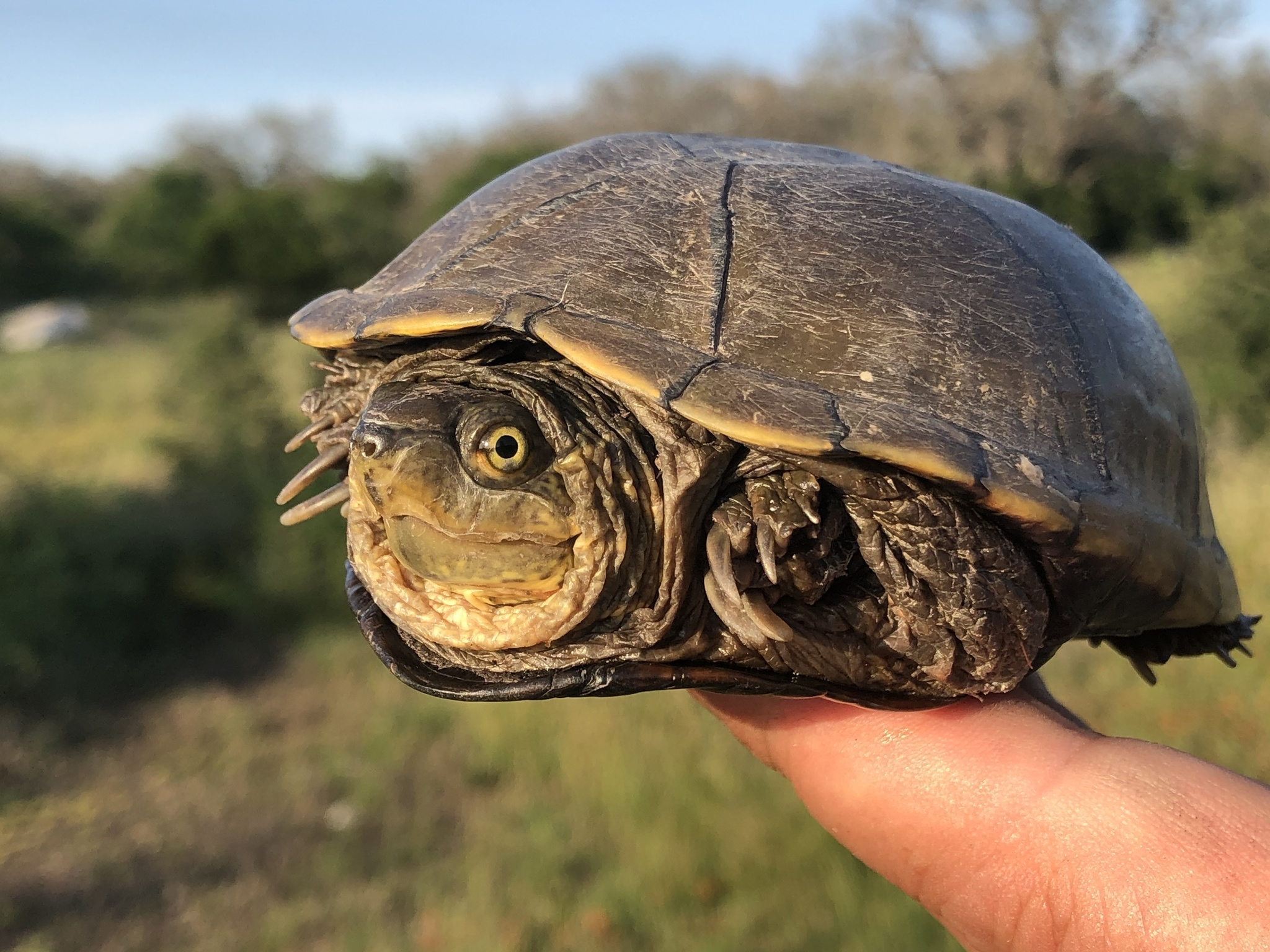
Texas

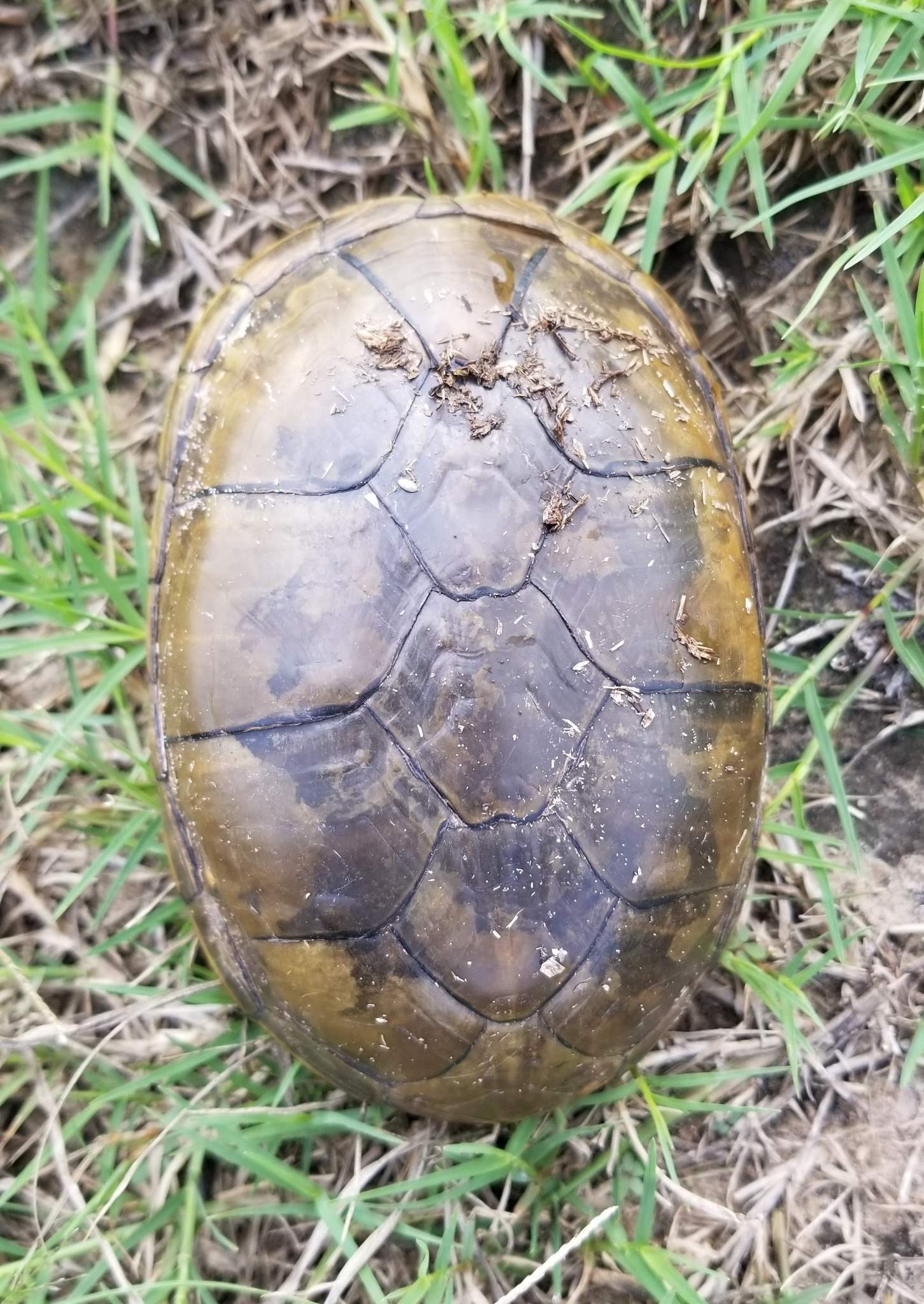
Carapace, Texas

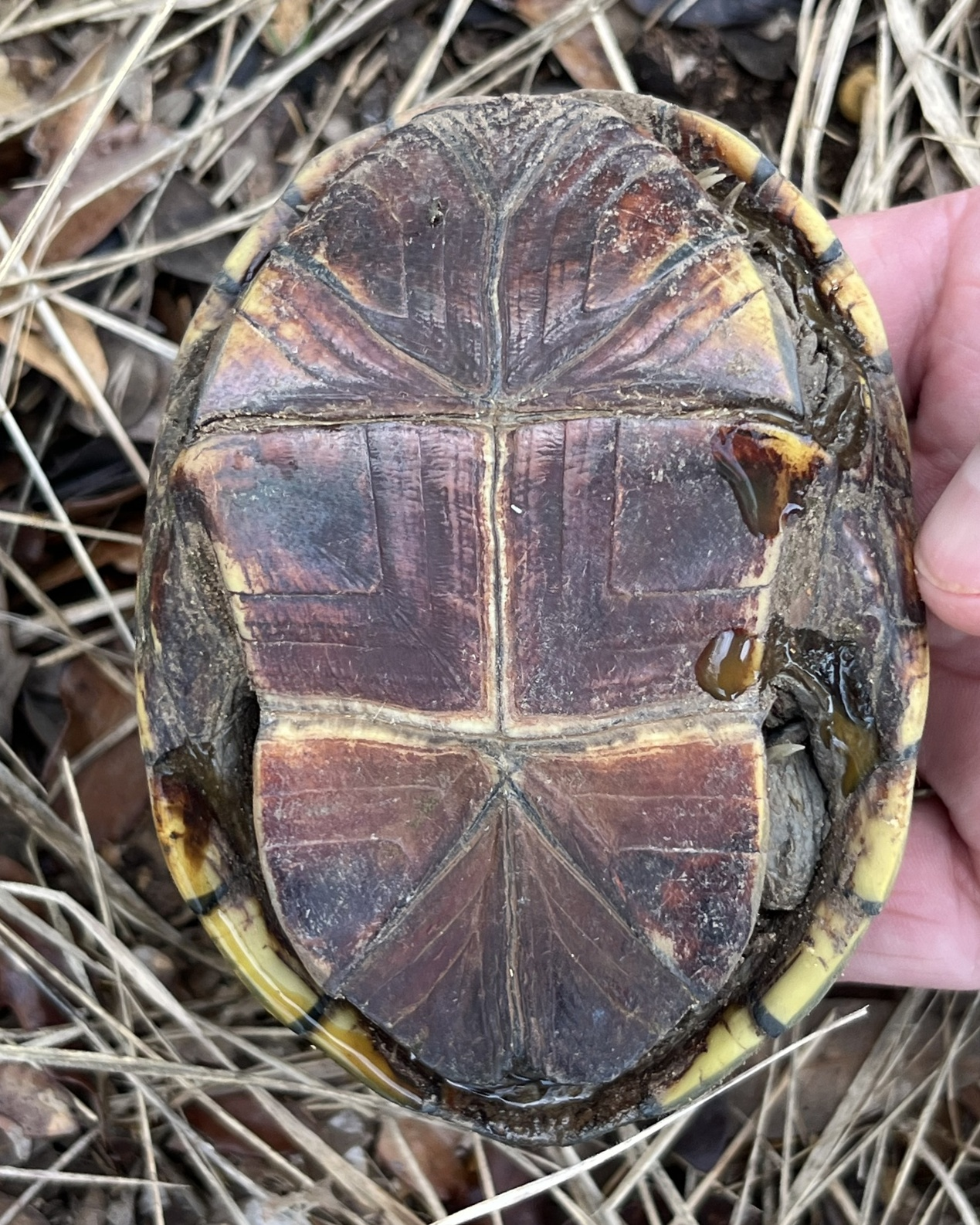
Plastron, Texas

== Lifespan ==
The yellow mud turtle can live for more than 40 years.

== Diet ==
Yellow mud turtles are omnivorous. Their diet includes worms, crayfish, frogs, snails, fish, fairy shrimp, slugs, leeches, tadpoles, and other aquatic insects and invertebrates. They also eat vegetation and dead and decaying matter.

Yellow mud turtles forage on land and water for food. In early spring their main diet is fairy shrimp they find in the shallows of their ponds. While they are burrowing, they will eat earthworms or grubs they encounter. Some studies show these turtles will eat earthworms that pass in front of them while hibernating. They also consume fish and other aquatic organisms.

== Behaviour ==
This species spends most of the year estivating underground, becoming active again when ponds refill from the summer monsoon season. If the amount of rain in a given year is inadequate, this species will remain underground until there is enough rain, and may remain underground for up to 24 months.

== Reproduction ==
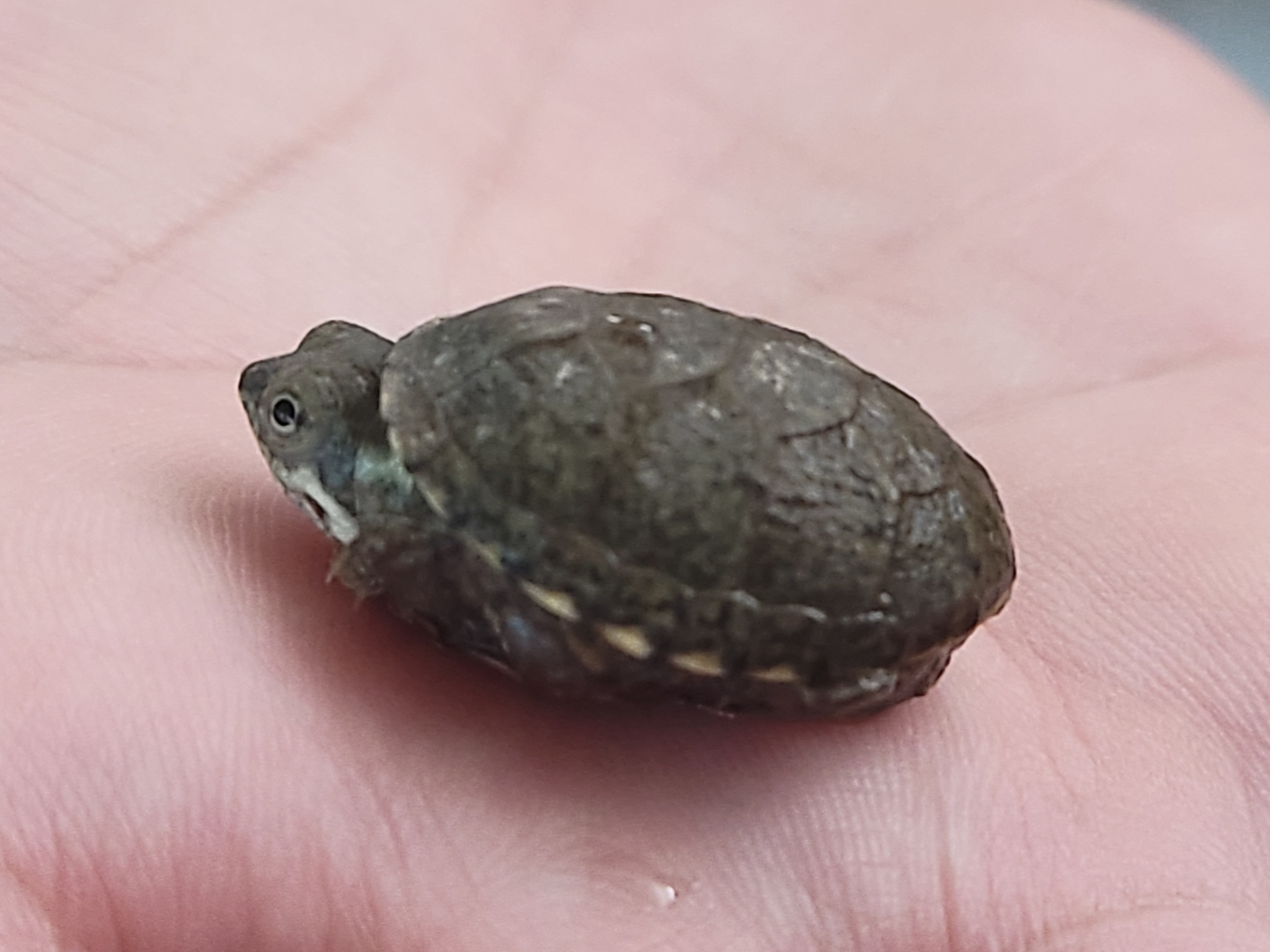
Hatchling, Texas

Most female aquatic turtles excavate a nest in the soil near a water source, deposit their eggs and leave, but yellow mud turtles exhibit a pattern of parental care. They are the only turtle that has been observed that stays with the eggs for any period of time. The female lays a clutch of 1-9 eggs and stays with the eggs for a period of time of a few hours up to 38 days. It is believed that the female stays to keep the predators away from the eggs. It was also observed that the females would urinate on their nests in dry years. This is believed to aid in the hatch success rate of the eggs in dry years.

It is believed that in their natural habitat that spring rains induce the turtles to begin nesting. The eggs hatch in the fall and some hatchlings leave the nest and spend the winter in aquatic habitats, but most of the hatchlings burrow below the nest and wait until spring to emerge and then move to the water. This is believed to aid in survival rates of the hatchlings, because some water bodies freeze solid during the winter. Another benefit of waiting to emerge in the spring is that hatchlings enter an environment of increasing resources, such as heat, light, and food.

== Predation ==
Yellow mud turtles have few natural predators as adults. As eggs and young they are preyed upon by striped skunks, raccoons, other turtles, water snakes (Nerodia), and large predatory fish.
