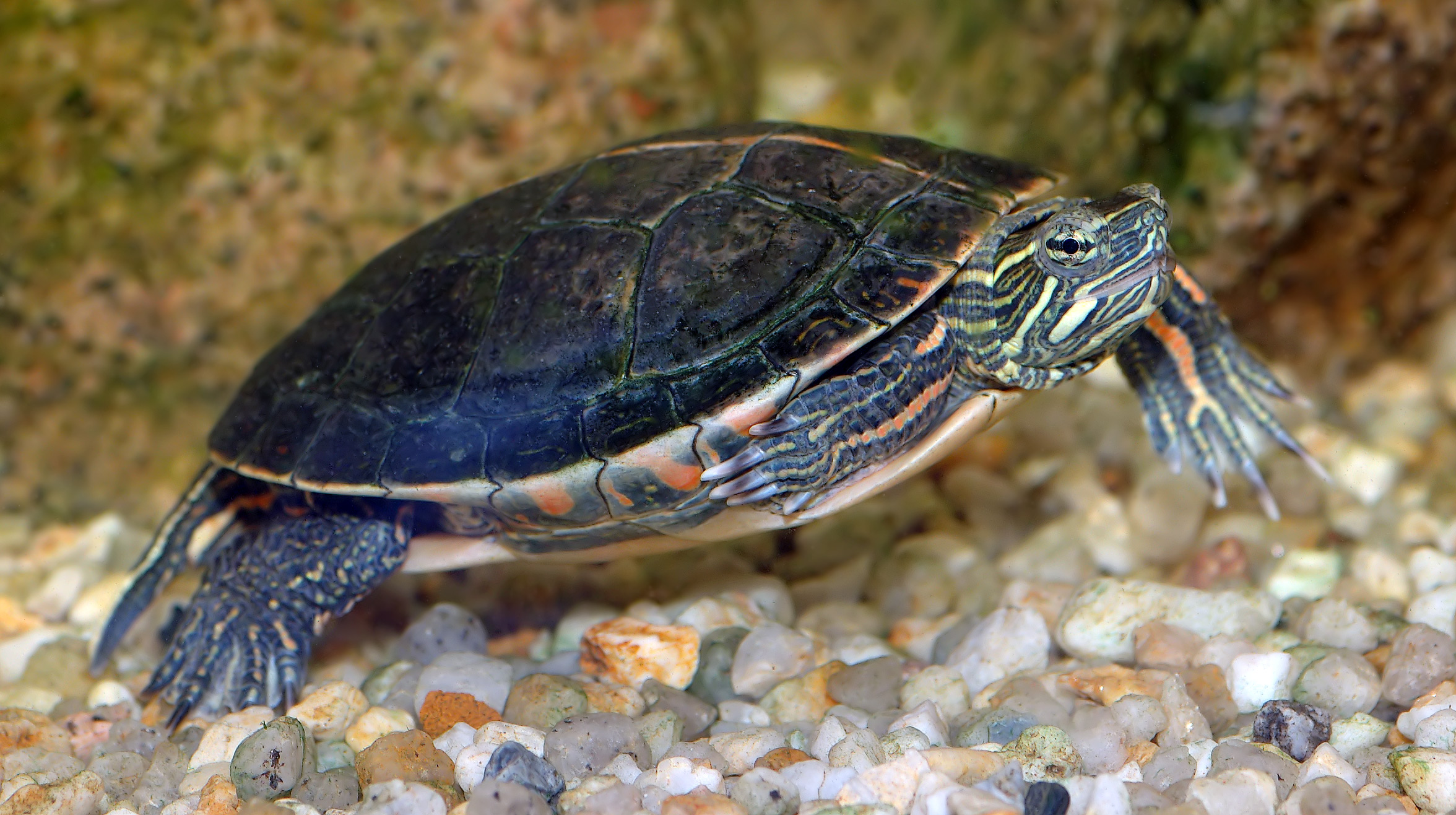
- Painted turtle (Chrysemys picta)

Scientific classification
- Kingdom: Animalia
- Phylum: Chordata
- Class: Reptilia
- Order: Testudines
- Suborder: Cryptodira
- Family: Emydidae
- Subfamily: Deirochelyinae; Agassiz, 1857

Genera
- See text.

= Deirochelyinae =

Subfamily of turtles

The Deirochelyinae are a subfamily of the Emydidae consisting of species native to North and South America, some of which are frequently kept as pets. As a result of pet trade, one species, the red-eared slider, can now be found in many parts of the world.

== Classification ==
=== Species ===
Image	Genus	Living species
	Chrysemys Gray, 1844	Chrysemys dorsalis - southern painted turtle; Chrysemys picta - painted turtle; eastern painted turtle (Chrysemys picta picta); midland painted turtle (Chrysemys picta marginata); western painted turtle (Chrysemys picta bellii)
	Deirochelys Agassiz, 1857	Deirochelys reticularia - chicken turtle; Eastern chicken turtle (Deirochelys reticularia reticularia); Florida chicken turtle (Deirochelys reticularia chrysea); Western chicken turtle (Deirochelys reticularia miaria)
	Graptemys Agassiz, 1857	Graptemys barbouri (Carr y Marchland, 1942); Graptemys caglei (Haynes y McKnown, 1974); Graptemys ernsti (Lovich y McCoy, 1992); Graptemys flavimaculata (Cagle, 1954); Graptemys geographica (Le Sueur, 1817); Graptemys gibbonsi (Lovich y McCoy, 1992); Graptemys nigrinoda (Cagle, 1954); Graptemys oculifera (Baur, 1890); Graptemys ouachitensis Cagle, 1953; Graptemys pearlensis (Ennen, Lovich, Kreiser, Selman, Qualls, 2010); Graptemys pseudogeographica (Gray, 1831); Graptemys pseudogeographica kohnii; Graptemys pulchra (Baur, 1893); Graptemys versa (Stejneger, 1925)
	Malaclemys Gray, 1844	Malaclemys terrapin - diamondback terrapin; Malaclemys terrapin littoralis (Hay, 1904) – Texas diamondback terrapin; Malaclemys terrapin macrospilota (Hay, 1904) – ornate diamondback terrapin; Malaclemys terrapin pileata (Wied, 1865) – Mississippi diamondback terrapin; Malaclemys terrapin rhizophorarum Fowler, 1906 – mangrove diamondback terrapin; Malaclemys terrapin tequesta Schwartz, 1955 – East Florida diamondback terrapin; Malaclemys terrapin terrapin (Schoepff, 1793) – northern diamondback terrapin
	Pseudemys Gray, 1856	Pseudemys alabamensis – Alabama red-bellied cooter; Pseudemys concinna – river cooter; Pseudemys concinna concinna – eastern river cooter; Pseudemys concinna suwanniensis – Suwannee cooter; Pseudemys floridana or Pseudemys concinna floridana – coastal plain cooter or Florida cooter; Pseudemys gorzugi – Rio Grande cooter; Pseudemys nelsoni – Florida red-bellied cooter; Pseudemys peninsularis – peninsula cooter; Pseudemys rubriventris – northern red-bellied cooter; Pseudemys texana – Texas river cooter
	Trachemys Agassiz, 1857	Trachemys adiutrix Vanzolini, 1995 – Maranhão slider; Trachemys callirostris (Gray, 1856) – Colombian slider; T. c. callirostris (Gray, 1856) – Colombian slider; T. c. chichiriviche (Pritchard & Trebbau, 1984) – Venezuelan slider; Trachemys decorata (Barbour & Carr, 1940) – Hispaniolan slider; Trachemys decussata (Bell, 1830) – Cuban slider; T. d. angusta (Barbour & Carr, 1940) – western Cuban slider; T. d. decussata (Bell, 1830) – eastern Cuban slider; Trachemys dorbigni (A.M.C. Duméril & Bibron, 1835) – D'Orbigny's slider; Trachemys emolli (Legler, 1990) – Nicaraguan slider; Trachemys gaigeae (Hartweg, 1939) – Big Bend slider; Trachemys hartwegi (Legler, 1990) – Nazas slider; Trachemys medemi Vargas-Ramírez, del Valle, Ceballos & Fritz, 2017 – Atrato slider; Trachemys nebulosa (Van Denburgh, 1895) – Baja California slider; T. n. hiltoni (Carr, 1942) – Fuerte slider; T. n. nebulosa (Van Denburgh, 1895) – Baja California slider; Trachemys ornata (Gray, 1830) – ornate slider; Trachemys scripta (Thunberg, 1792) – pond slider; T. s. elegans (Wied, 1839) – red-eared slider; T. s. scripta (Thunberg, 1792) – yellow-bellied slider; T. s. troostii (Holbrook, 1836) – Cumberland slider; Trachemys stejnegeri (Schmidt, 1928) – Central Antillean slider; T. s. malonei (Barbour & Carr, 1938) – Inagua slider; T. s. stejnegeri (Schmidt, 1928) – Puerto Rican slider; T. s. vicina (Barbour & Carr, 1940) – Dominican slider; Trachemys taylori (Legler, 1960) – Cuatro Ciénegas slider; Trachemys terrapen (Bonnaterre, 1789) – Jamaican slider; Trachemys venusta (Gray, 1856) – Meso-American slider; T. v. cataspila (Günther, 1885) – Huasecan slider; T. v. grayi (Bocourt, 1868) – Gray's slider or Tehuantepec slider; T. v. iversoni McCord, Joseph-Ouni, Hagen & Blanck, 2010 – Yucatan slider; T. v. panamensis McCord, Joseph-Ouni, Hagen & Blanck, 2010 – Panamanian slider; T. v. uhrigi McCord, Joseph-Ouni, Hagen & Blanck, 2010 – Uhrig's slider; T. v. venusta (Gray, 1856) – Belize slider; Trachemys yaquia (Legler & Webb, 1970) – Yaqui slider
