= Atrato slider =

Scientific classification
- Kingdom: Animalia
- Phylum: Chordata
- Class: Reptilia
- Order: Testudines
- Suborder: Cryptodira
- Family: Emydidae
- Genus: Trachemys
- Species: T. medemi

Binomial name
- Trachemys medemi Vargas-Ramírez, del Valle, Ceballos & Fritz, 2017

Species of turtle

The Atrato slider (Trachemys medemi) is a species of turtle in the family Emydidae endemic to northwestern Colombia. It was described in 2017.

== Geographic range ==
The Atrato slider's geographical range is in the lower Atrato River basin of Antioquia and Chocó departments of northwestern Colombia, near the Panamanian border.

== Evolutionary history ==
There were two major migrations of sliders into South America during the Great American Interchange of the Cenozoic. During the first migration, which occurred about 7.1-8.6 million years ago, the last recent common ancestor of T. medemi and T. dorbigni spread from Central America into South America, with T. dorbigni expanding into the eastern parts of the continent while T. medemi remained in present-day Colombia. T. medemi diverged from T. dorbigni about 2.8-4.1 million years ago, with T. dorbigni diversifying about 1.9-2.3 million years ago. In the meantime, during the second migration of Trachemys sliders 2.2-2.5 million years ago, T. venusta arrived in South America.
