= Trachemys haugrudi =

Trachemys haugrudi Temporal range: Zanclean

Scientific classification
- Kingdom: Animalia
- Phylum: Chordata
- Class: Reptilia
- Order: Testudines
- Suborder: Cryptodira
- Family: Emydidae
- Genus: Trachemys
- Species: †T. haugrudi

Binomial name
- †Trachemys haugrudi Jasinski, 2018

Trachemys haugrudi is an extinct species of Trachemys that lived during the Zanclean stage of the Pliocene epoch.

== Distribution ==
Trachemys haugrudi is known from the Gray Fossil Site of eastern Tennessee.
