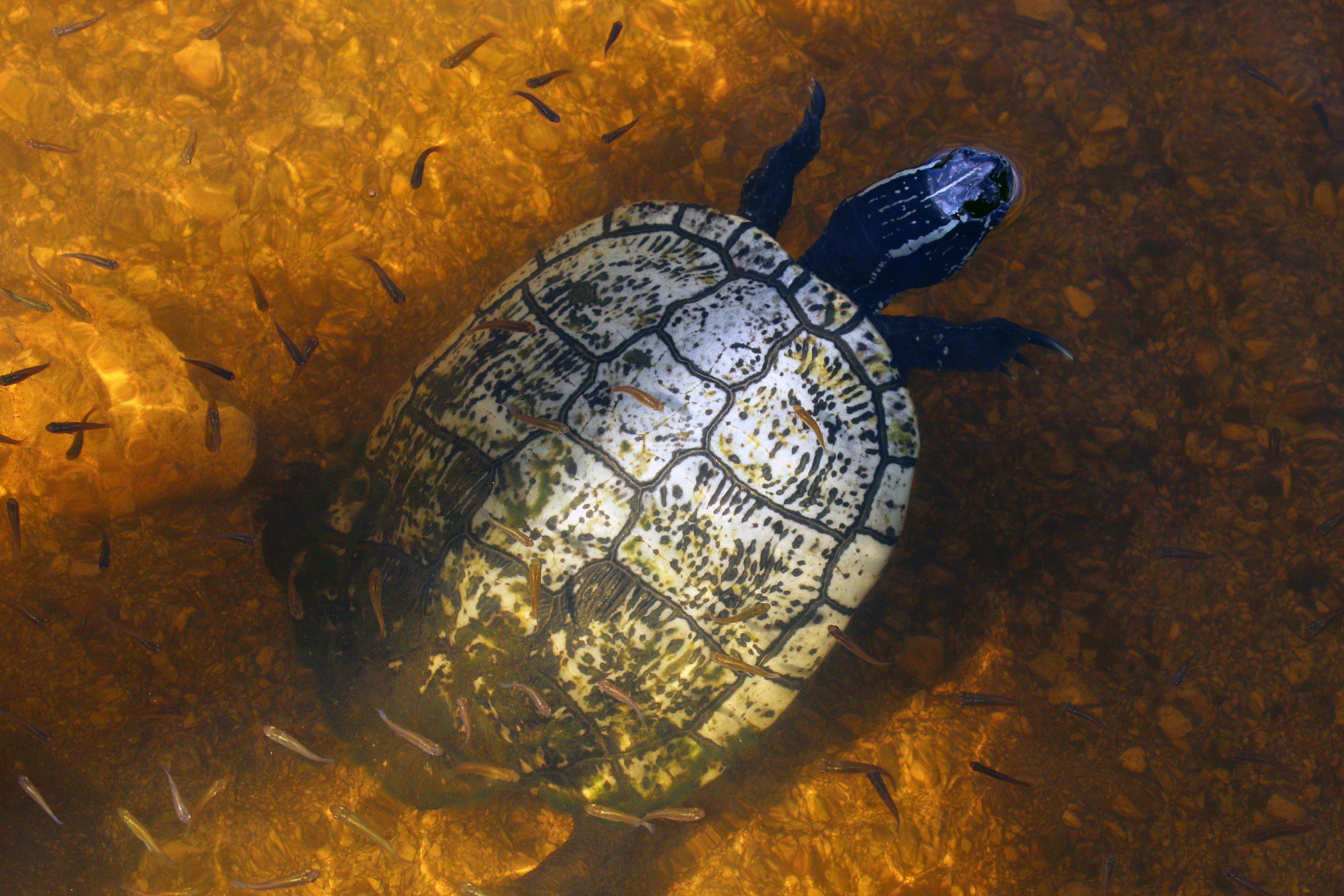
- Taco river slider or hickatee T. d. angusta Grand Cayman

Scientific classification
- Domain: Eukaryota
- Kingdom: Animalia
- Phylum: Chordata
- Class: Reptilia
- Order: Testudines
- Suborder: Cryptodira
- Superfamily: Testudinoidea
- Family: Emydidae
- Genus: Trachemys
- Species: T. decussata

Binomial name
- Trachemys decussata (Gray, 1831)

Subspecies
- T. d. decussata; T. d. angusta

Synonyms
- Trachemys decussata decussata: Emys decussata Gray, 1831; Emys rugosa Gray, 1831; Emys vermiculata Gray, 1844; Ptychemys decussata Agassiz, 1857; Trachemys rugosa Agassiz, 1857; Emys jamao Duméril, 1861 (nomen nudum); Clemmys decussata Strauch, 1862; Clemmys rugosa Strauch, 1862; Emys gnatho Vilaró, 1868; Emys jamao Vilaró, 1868; Pseudemys decussata Gray, 1870; Chrysemys scripta var. rugosa Boulenger, 1889; Pseudemys decussata decussata Barbour & Carr, 1940; Pseudemys decussata plana Barbour & Carr, 1940; Pseudemys rugosa decussata Mittleman, 1947; Pseudemys rugosa rugosa Mittleman, 1947; Pseudemys terrapen decussata Mertens & Wermuth, 1955; Pseudemys terrapen plana Mertens & Wermuth, 1955; Pseudemys terrapen rugosa Wermuth & Mertens, 1961; Chrysemys (Trachemys) decussata McDowell, 1964; Chrysemys decussata decussata Schwartz & Thomas, 1975; Chrysemys terrapen decussata Obst, 1983; Chrysemys terrapen plana Obst, 1983; Trachemys decussata Seidel & Incháustegui, 1984; Chrysemys terrapen rugosa Obst, 1985; Trachemys decussata decussata Iverson, 1985; Trachemys decussata plana Iverson, 1985; Trachemys terrapen rugosa Vanzolini, 1995; Trachemys decussata angusta: Pseudemys decussata angusta Barbour & Carr, 1940; Pseudemys granti Barbour & Carr, 1941; Pseudemys rugosa angusta Mittleman, 1947; Pseudemys terrapen angusta Mertens & Wermuth, 1955; Pseudemys terrapen granti Mertens & Wermuth, 1955; Pseudemys decussata granti Williams, 1956; Pseudemys stejnegeri granti Pritchard, 1967; Chrysemys terrapen granti Williams, 1969; Chrysemys decussata granti Schwartz & Thomas, 1975; Chrysemys terrapen angusta Obst, 1983; Trachemys decussata angusta Iverson, 1985; Trachemys decussata granti Iverson, 1985; Trachemys granti Seidel, 1988; Trachemys stejnegeri granti Stubbs, 1989; Trachemys decussata angusti Franz, Dodd & Budden, 1993 (ex errore); Trachemys decorata angusta Obst, 1996

= Cuban slider =

Species of turtle

The Cuban slider (Trachemys decussata) is a species of turtle native to Cuba (including Isla de la Juventud), but has also been introduced to Grand Cayman and Cayman Brac in the Cayman Islands (where it is known as the taco river slider or hickatee), and Marie Galante in Guadeloupe.

== Gallery ==
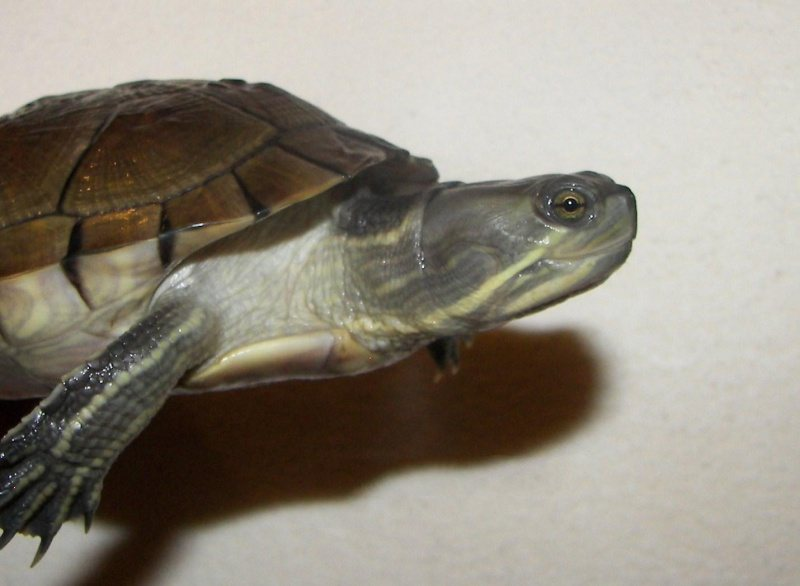
Profile of T. decussata angusta

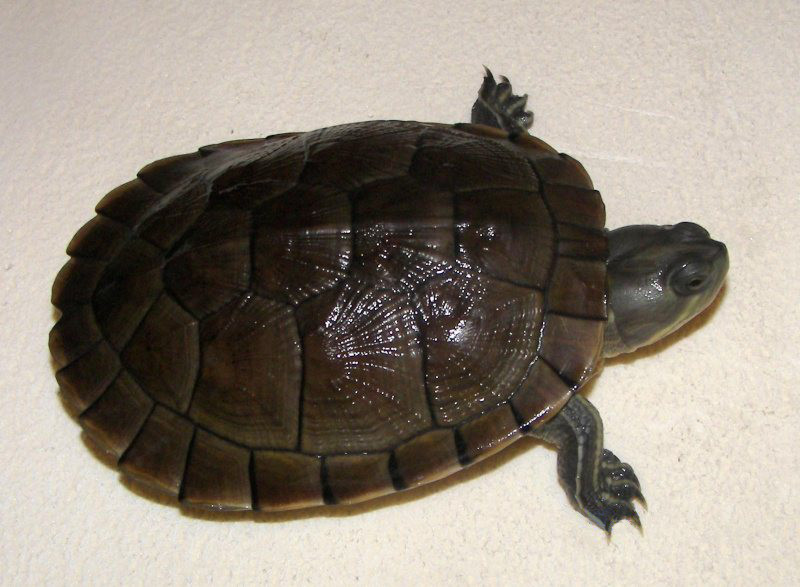
Shell of T. decussata angusta

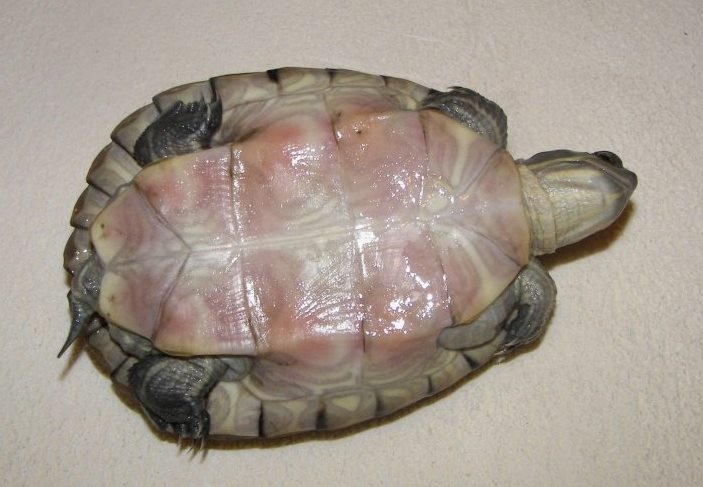
Plastron of T. decussata angusta
