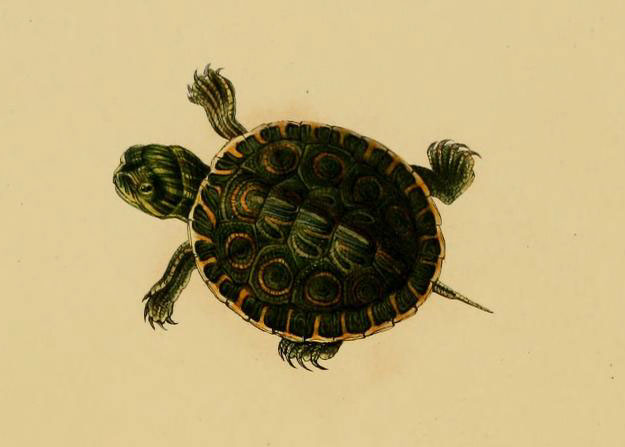
- Juvenile ornate slider illustrated by James de Carle Sowerby

Conservation status
- Vulnerable (IUCN 3.1)

Scientific classification
- Kingdom: Animalia
- Phylum: Chordata
- Class: Reptilia
- Order: Testudines
- Suborder: Cryptodira
- Family: Emydidae
- Genus: Trachemys
- Species: T. ornata

Binomial name
- Trachemys ornata (Gray, 1830)

Synonyms
- Emys ornata Gray, 1831; Clemmys (Clemmys) ornata Fitzinger, 1835; Callichelys ornata Gray, 1863; Pseudemys ornata Cope, 1876; Chrysemys ornata Boulenger, 1889; Chrysemys [ornata] ornata Siebenrock, 1909; Pseudemys ornata ornata Mertens, Müller & Rust, 1934; Pseudemys scripta ornata Carr, 1938; Pseudomys scripta ornata Malkin, 1956; Chrysemys scripta ornata Smith & Taylor, 1966; Trachemys scripta ornata Iverson, 1985; Trachemys ornata King & Burke, 1989; Trachemys ornata ornata Walls, 1996

= Ornate slider =

Species of turtle

The ornate slider (Trachemys ornata) is turtle belonging to the genus Trachemys of the family Emydidae. It is found in Guerrero, Jalisco, Nayarit and Sinaloa in western Mexico.

== Subspecies ==
- No subspecies
