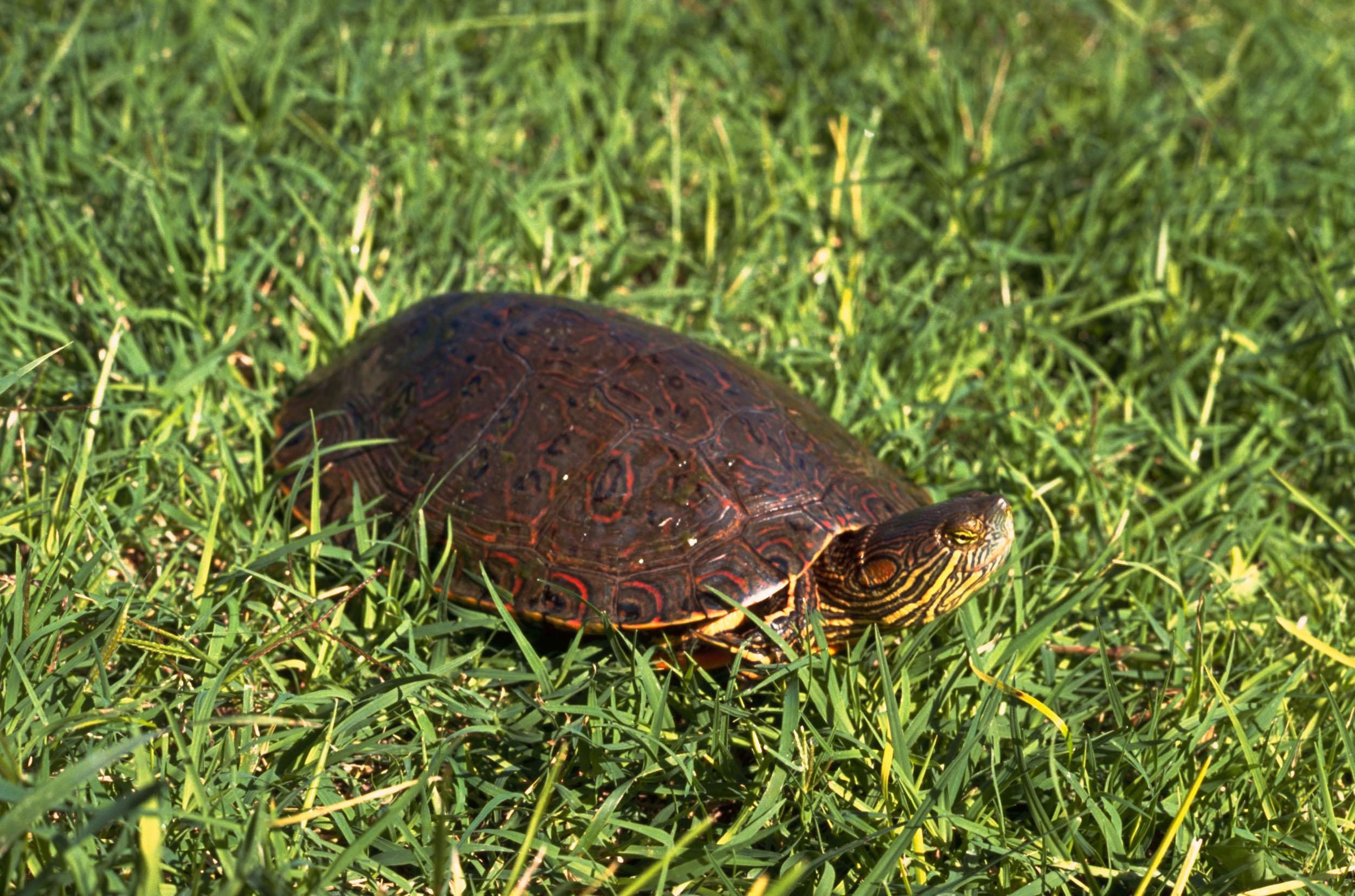

Conservation status
- Vulnerable (IUCN 3.1)

Scientific classification
- Kingdom: Animalia
- Phylum: Chordata
- Class: Reptilia
- Order: Testudines
- Suborder: Cryptodira
- Family: Emydidae
- Genus: Trachemys
- Species: T. gaigeae

Binomial name
- Trachemys gaigeae Hartweg, 1939

Synonyms
- Nota bene: Dashes indicate scientific names which are simply new combinations, i.e., not new taxa.: Pseudemys scripta gaigeae Hartweg, 1939; Pseudemys gaigeae — Stejneger & Barbour, 1939; Pseudemys scripta gagei Zweig & Crenshaw, 1957 (ex errore); Chrysemys scripta gaigeae — H.M. Smith & Taylor, 1966; Pseudemys scripta gaigei Ernst, 1967 (ex errore); Chrysemys gaigeae — Weaver & Rose, 1967; Pseudemys scripta gaigea Degenhardt & Christiansen, 1974 (ex errore); Chrysemys gaigae Ashton, Edwards & Pisani, 1976 (ex errore); Chrysemys gaigea — Morafka, 1977; Chrysemys scripta gaigae — Morafka, 1977; Trachemys nebulosa gaigeae — Ward, 1984; Pseudemys scripta gaigae — Stebbins, 1985; Trachemys scripta gaigeae — Iverson, 1985; Trachemys gaigeae — Dixon, 1987; Trachemys gaigae — Williamson, Hyder & Applegarth, 1994; Trachemys ornata gaigeae — Walls, 1996; Trachemys gaigeae gaigeae — Seidel, 2002; Trachemys scripta gaigae — Gurley, 2003; Trachemys nebulosa gaigae — Joseph-Ouni, 2004

= Big Bend slider =

Species of turtle

The Big Bend slider (Trachemys gaigeae), also called commonly the Mexican Plateau slider and la jicotea de la meseta mexicana in Mexican Spanish, is a species of aquatic turtle in the family Emydidae. The species is native to the Southwestern United States and northern Mexico.

== Taxonomy ==
The species Trachemys gaigeae was first described by professor of zoology at the University of Michigan, Dr. Norman Edouard Hartweg, in 1939, as a subspecies, Pseudemys scripta gaigeae. Later, it was assigned to the genus Chrysemys, then to the genus Trachemys. Most recently, it was granted full species status, though many sources still refer to it by its various synonyms.

The Nazas slider (T. hartwegi) of the Nazas River in northern Mexico was formerly considered a subspecies of T. gaigeae, but was reclassified as a distinct species by the Turtle Taxonomy Working Group and the Reptile Database in 2021.

== Geographic range ==
T. gaigeae is native to the United States in the states of New Mexico and Texas, and to northern Mexico in the state of Chihuahua. It is found primarily in the Rio Grande and Rio Concho.

== Etymology ==
The epithet, gaigeae, is in honor of American herpetologist Helen Beulah Thompson Gaige, who collected the first specimen in the Big Bend region of Texas in 1928.

== Behavior ==
Primarily aquatic, the Big Bend slider is often seen basking on rocks or logs in the water, and when approached quickly dives to the bottom. The only time it spends a large amount of time on land is when females emerge to lay eggs. It is an omnivorous species, with younger animals being more carnivorous, and progressively becoming more herbivorous as they age, with older adults being nearly entirely herbivorous.

== Description ==
Adults of T. gaigeae have a straight carapace length of 5 to 11 inches (13 to 28 cm).
