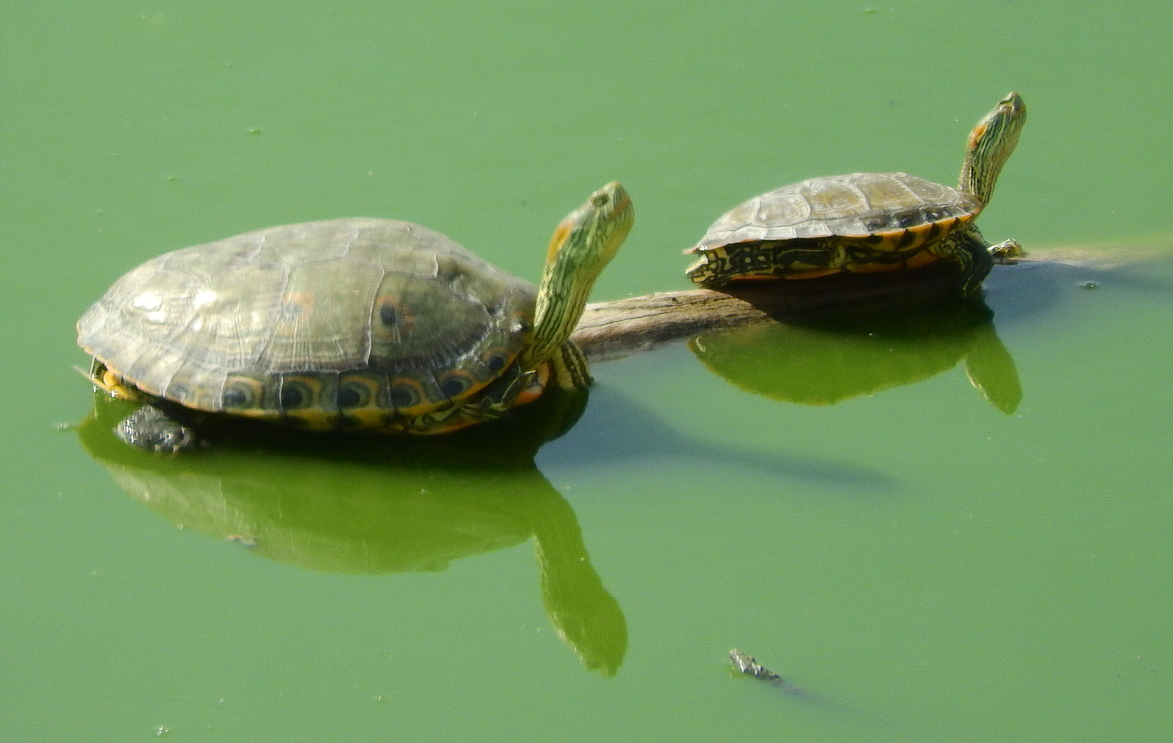

Scientific classification
- Kingdom: Animalia
- Phylum: Chordata
- Class: Reptilia
- Order: Testudines
- Suborder: Cryptodira
- Family: Emydidae
- Genus: Trachemys
- Species: T. hartwegi

Binomial name
- Trachemys hartwegi (Legler, 1990)

Synonyms
- Nota bene: Dashes indicate scientific names which are simply new combinations, i.e., not new taxa.: Pseudemys scripta hartwegi Legler, 1980 (nomen nudum); Chrysemys scripta hartwegi — Obst, 1983; Trachemys scripta hartwegi — Iverson, 1985; Pseudemys scripta hartwegi Legler, 1990; Trachemys scripta hartwegi — Iverson, 1992; Trachemys ornata hartwegi — Walls, 1996; Trachemys nebulosa hartwegi — Bringsøe, 2001; Trachemys gaigeae hartwegi — Seidel, 2002

= Nazas slider =

Species of turtle

The Nazas slider (Trachemys hartwegi) is a species of turtle in the family Emydidae. It is endemic to northern Mexico.

== Taxonomy ==
It was formerly considered a subspecies of the Big Bend slider (T. gaigeae), but in 2021 it was reclassified as a distinct species by the Turtle Taxonomy Working Group and the Reptile Database. Both hartwegi and gaigeae may have originally evolved in endorheic basins until their respective basins were captured by the Pecos-Grande system.

== Distribution ==
It is endemic to Mexico, where it is only found in the main channel of the Nazas River in northeastern Durango and southwestern Coahuila.

== Status ==
Although presently considered conspecific with T. gaigeae on the IUCN Red List, with T. gaigeae as a whole classified as Vulnerable, T. hartwegi qualifies for Endangered status due to widespread extirpation across its range. The population near San Pedro de las Colonias was thought to be nearing extinction as of 1990, and a population near Laguna Viesca in Coahuila is thought to have been extinct since 1960. Aridity and increased use of water for irrigation is thought to pose a risk to all populations of T. hartwegi aside from those near Presa El Palmito in Durango.
