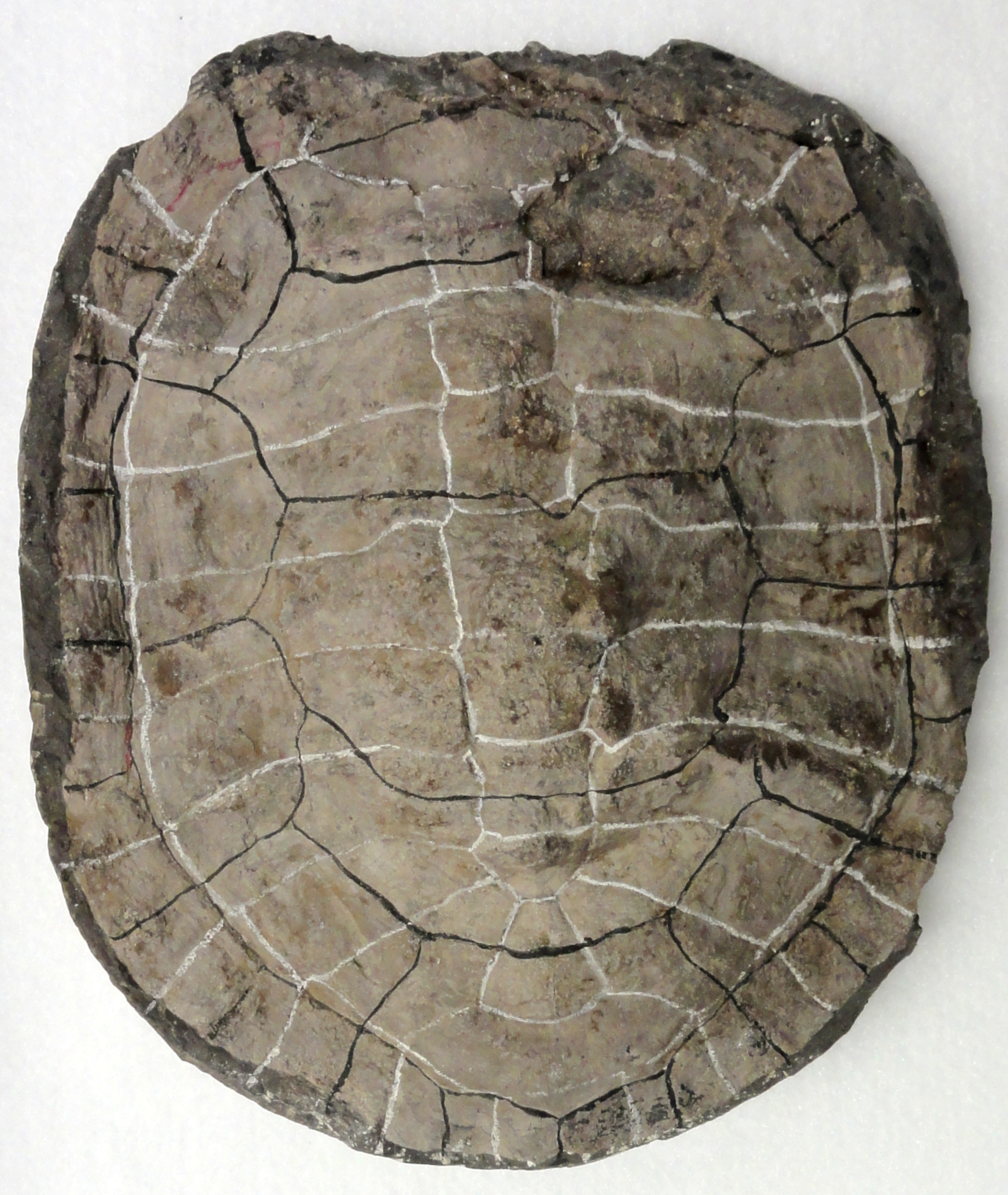
- Holotype carapace

Scientific classification
- Kingdom: Animalia
- Phylum: Chordata
- Class: Reptilia
- Order: Testudines
- Suborder: Cryptodira
- Superfamily: Testudinoidea
- Genus: †Acherontemys; Hay, 1899
- Species: †A. heckmani

Binomial name
- †Acherontemys heckmani Hay, 1899

= Acherontemys =

Acherontemys Temporal range: Lutetian ~47–45 Ma

Extinct genus of turtles

Acherontemys is an extinct genus of turtle from Eocene sediments in northwestern North America and comprising a single species Acherontemys heckmani. Acherontemys has been placed within the pond turtle superfamily Testudinoidea as part of the clade Pan-Emydidae.

== Distribution ==
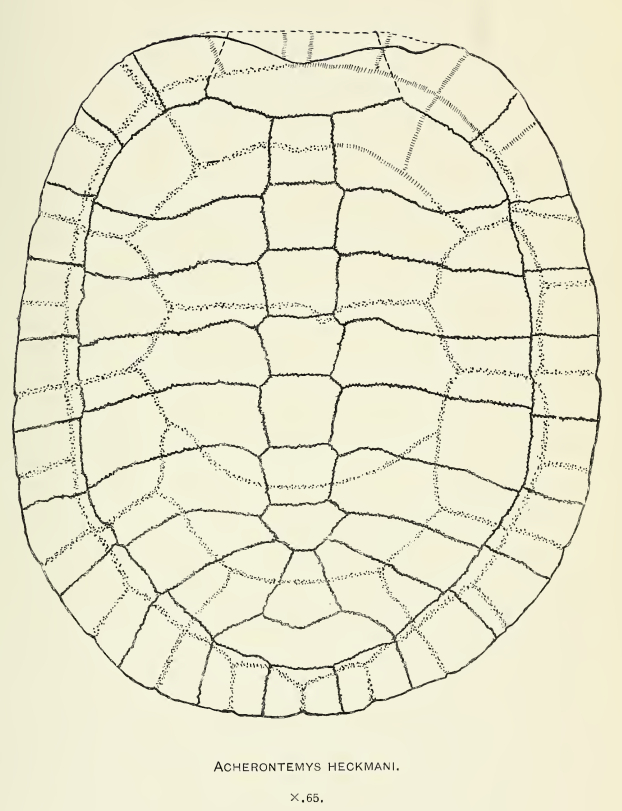
Original 1899 illustration

The only known specimen of Acherontemys heckmani was recovered from strata of the Roslyn Formation in Kittitas County, Washington. At the time of description Oliver Perry Hay listed the "Roslyn sandstone" as being of Miocene in age. The formation has subsequently been redated to be of Middle Eocene, Lutetian age, with date constraints between 47.58 ± 0.028 million years ago to 45.91 ± 0.021 million years ago.

== History and classification ==
The turtle was collected from rocks exposed along a coal seam in the Northern Pacific Railroads Northwestern Improvement Company No. 4 Mine. The mine utilized a vertical shaft with hoist to access coal seams being mined, and had a pump system to prevent water influx filling the workings. The fossil was spotted and recovered by P.Y. Heckman who then passed it on to the Smithsonian for study using paleobotanist Frank Hall Knowlton as an intermediary. Due to the nature of the matrix encasing the fossil, which was described by Oliver Perry Hay as "refractory", only the upper surface of the carapace was excavated, leaving the plastron encased at time of description. Hay's original descriptions of the genus and species were published in an 1899 Proceedings of the United States National Museum paper along with the species description of Hadrianus schucherti, now placed as Cymatholcus schucherti. While no information was given on the derivation of the species name, Hay chose to coin the genus name Acherontemys as a reference to the Acheron river, a "river of the fabled lower world", in combination with the turtle genus Emys.

Hay expressed wishes that additional specimens might be recovered from the mine to give more understanding of the species. However the mine suffered a catastrophic explosion and fire a decade later at 12:45 p.m on October 3, 1909, killing 10 workers and burning down all the mine building except the brick powerhouse. The mine was never reopened.

Acherontemys was originally assigned to the Chelydridae by Hay, a placement maintained by Robert L. Carroll (1988). J. Howard Hutchison (1992), however, classified it within Emydidae, and this placement was maintained by Evangelos Vlachos (2016), who placed it in the Testudinoidea clade Pan-Emydidae. Vlachos notes the extra-wide vertebral scutes as distinguishing A. heckmani from any other testudinoid taxa of North America, though the size is seen in some European geoemydids.

== Description ==
The broad shell of 181 mm (7.1 in) long by 118 mm (4.6 in) wide with a low depressed dome and smooth posterior margin with no serrations. Along the central keel are a series of low bosses. The upper surface is smooth and the sutures are distinct while some areas of the costal shield surfaces are wrinkled. The scutes on the shell consisted of five notedly large vertebrals, surrounding narrowed costals, and 23 total marginal scutes. Sixteen square marginals are placed, in pairs, at the ends of the four costal scutes, with the remaining marginals along the margins of vertebral scutes I and IV. The costal scutes are narrower than in other genera as a result of the enlarged vertebrals. The vertebrals are extra wide, with Hay (1908) listing vertebral I at 75 mm (3.0 in), vertebral II at 90 mm (3.5 in), vertebral III at 85 mm (3.3 in), vertebral IV at 75 mm (3.0 in) and vertebral V at 65 mm (2.6 in). Vetrabrals II and III are also longer than the other three, which are narrowed to compensate, so much so that the sulcus between III and IV is located over the sixth neural bone rather than the fifth.

Hay interpreted the underlying bones of the shell as having eight neural bones and a single extra large suprapygal. This was later challenged, with Vlachos (2018), after reexamination of the holotype, finding seven pairs of neural bones combined with two suprapygals. He interpreted Hays neural 8 as "suprapygal I" placed directly anterior to "suprapygal II", Hays "pygal" bone, with a narrow front margin, elongated sides, and a rounded rear margin giving a pentagonal outline. Both authors note the distinctly wide nature of superpygal II, which is rectangular in general outline and spans the width of the 3 rear peripheral bones. Along the front margin, damage to the edge of the specimen is noted, with the nuchal bone missing its front edge.

== Paleoenvironment ==
Deposition in the Roslyn Formation paleoenvironment featured westerly flowing rivers and streams and the flora is noted to be lacking in palm trees, which are found in older lowland formations of the area.
