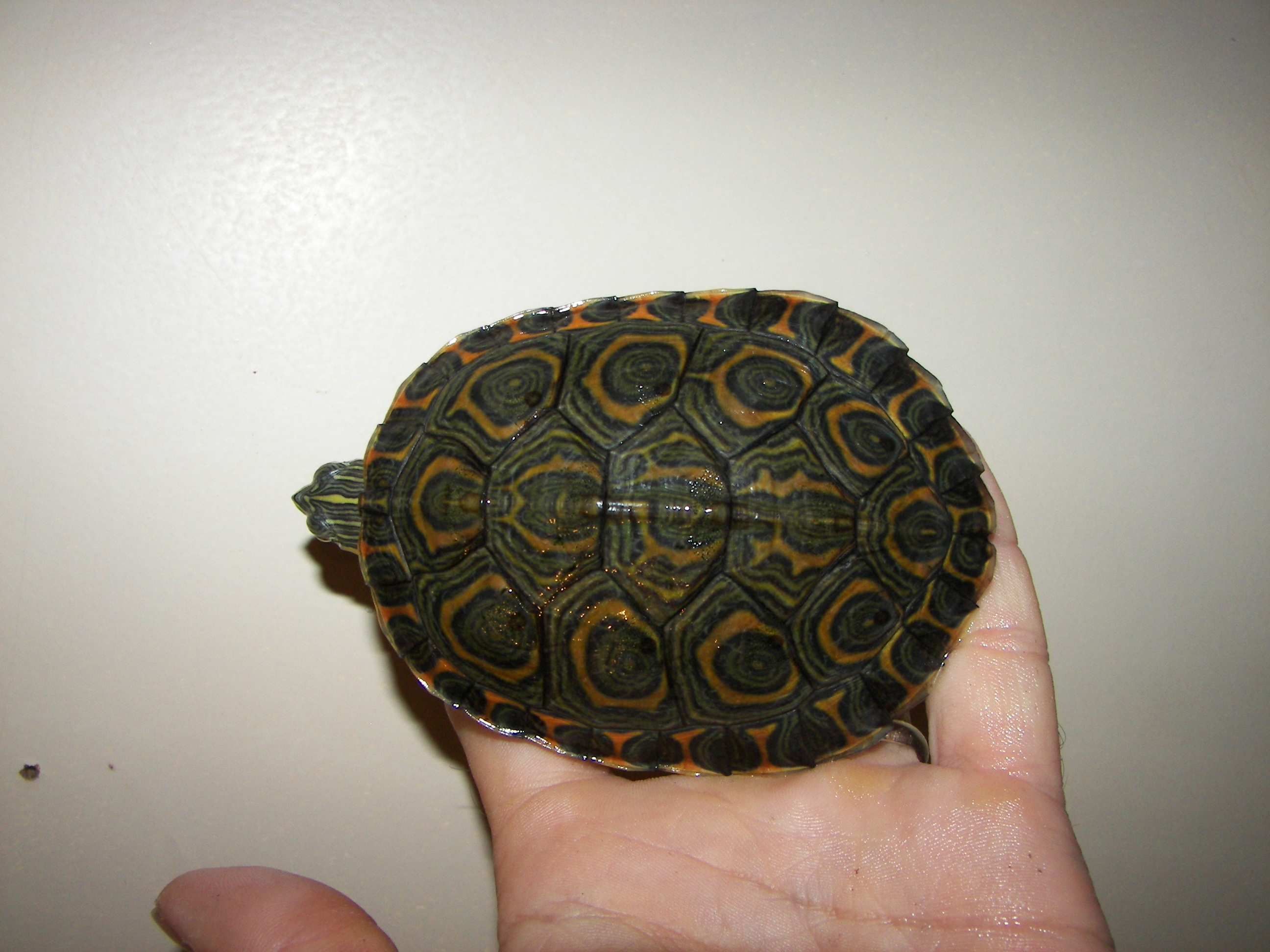
- Trachemys emolli

Conservation status
- Not evaluated (IUCN 2.3)

Scientific classification
- Kingdom: Animalia
- Phylum: Chordata
- Class: Reptilia
- Order: Testudines
- Suborder: Cryptodira
- Family: Emydidae
- Genus: Trachemys
- Species: T. emolli

Binomial name
- Trachemys emolli (Legler, 1990)

Synonyms
- Pseudemys nnnmmscripta emolli Legler, 1990; Trachemys scripta emolli — Iverson, 1992; Trachemys ornata emolli — Walls, 1996; Trachemys emolli — Seidel, 2002; Trachemys venusta emolli — Artner, 2003; Trachemys grayi emolli — TTWG, 2021

= Nicaraguan slider =

Species of turtle

The Nicaraguan slider (Trachemys emolli) is a species of turtle in the family Emydidae. The species is indigenous to Nicaragua and Costa Rica.

== Taxonomy ==
Formerly the Nicaraguan slider was considered a subspecies of Trachemys scripta, but was elevated to its own species level by Seidel in 2002. In 2021 it was considered a subspecies of T. grayi by the Turtle Taxonomy Working Group (TTWG).

== Etymology ==
The subspecific name, emolli, is in honor of American herpetologist Edward Moll (E. Moll).

== Geographic range ==
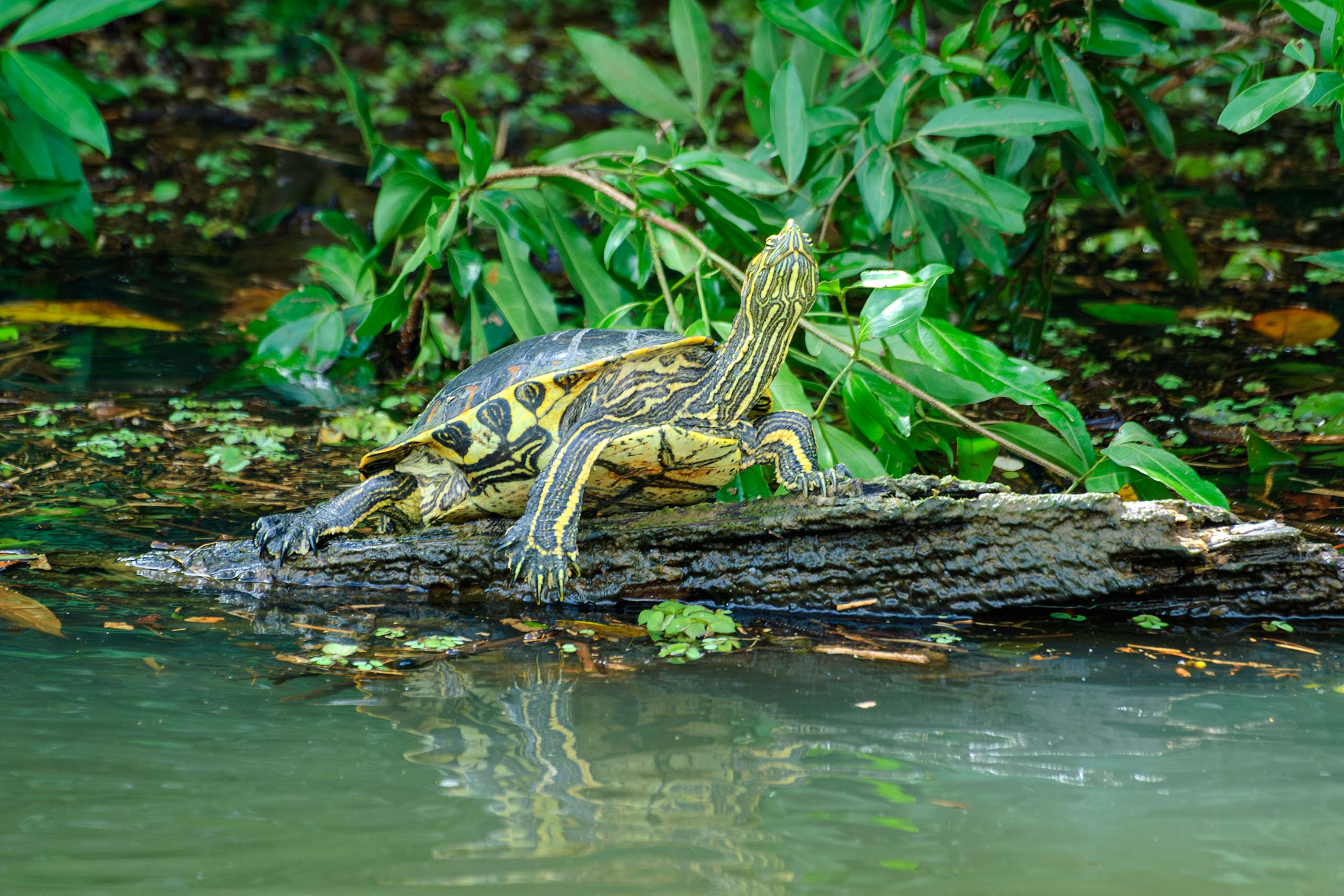
Nicaraguan slider - Trachemys emolli, Caño Negro Wildlife Refuge, Costa Rica

The Nicaraguan slider is native to Nicaragua and Costa Rica, and is found in places such as Lake Nicaragua, Lake Managua, and the lakes and streams that connect them.

== Characteristics ==
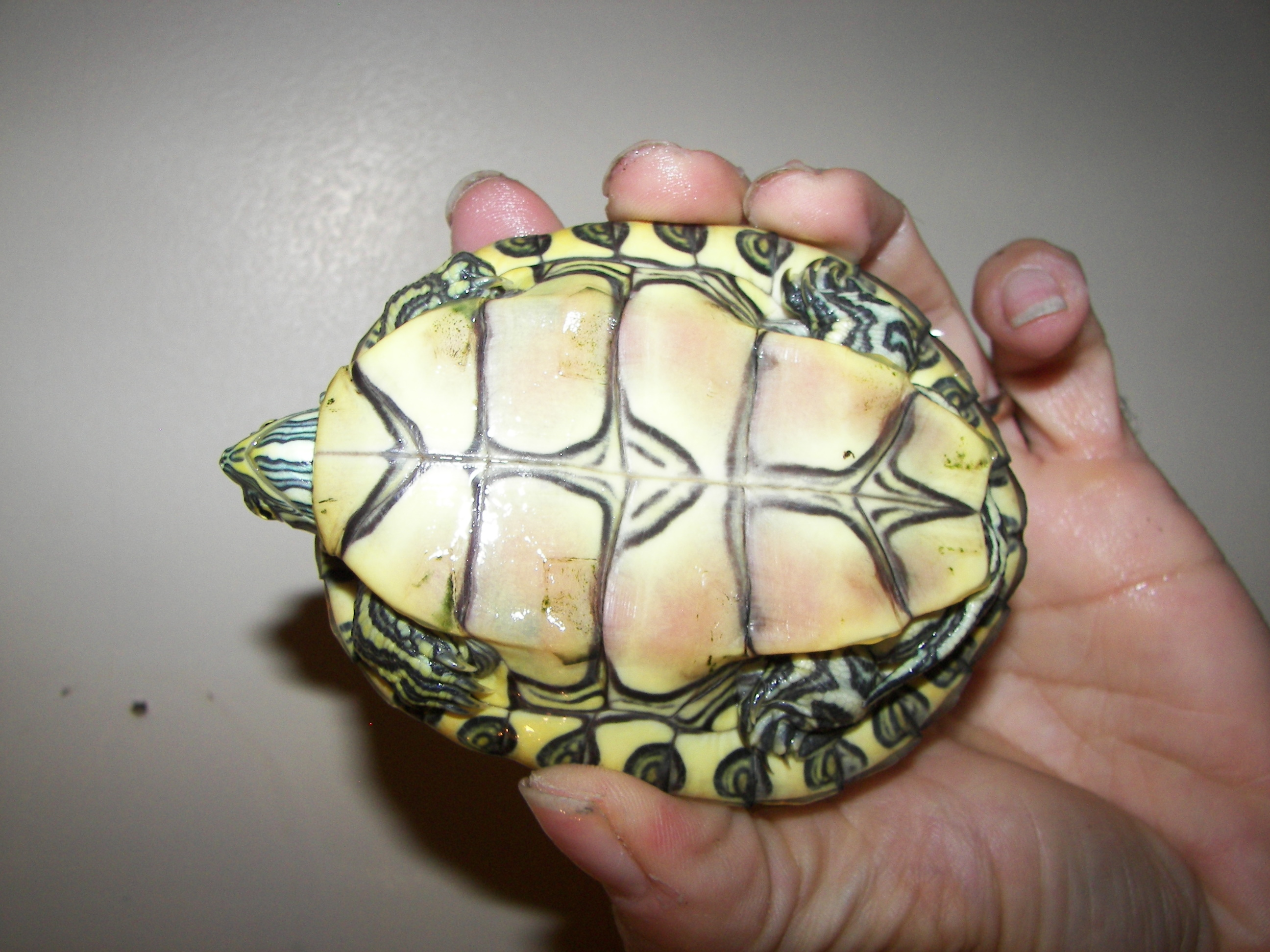
Plastron of Trachemys emolli

The Nicaraguan slider has a carapace with many circular markings on it, and in the middle of each marking, there is a dark spot. The main color of the carapace and the turtle's skin is olive green to dark brown. It also has yellow markings on it as well. The supratemporal markings can be orange, pink, or yellow. Males averagely grow to 8–12 in (20–30 cm) straight carapace length, and females can averagely grow to 15 in (38 cm) or larger.

== Biology ==
The Nicaraguan slider likes its water to be around mid-70s to 80 degrees Fahrenheit (24 to 27 degrees Celsius). As far as basking goes, it likes its basking area to be in the high 80s to mid-90s degrees Fahrenheit (30 to 35 degrees Celsius).

== Diet ==
In the wild, the juvenile Nicaraguan slider eats the following: tadpoles, crustaceans, fish, insects and insect larvae.

== Breeding ==
The nesting season of T. g. emolli ranges from about the month of December to May. Females can lay several clutches per season with up to thirty-five eggs per clutch. The hatchlings emerge about 69 to 123 days after the eggs have been deposited.
