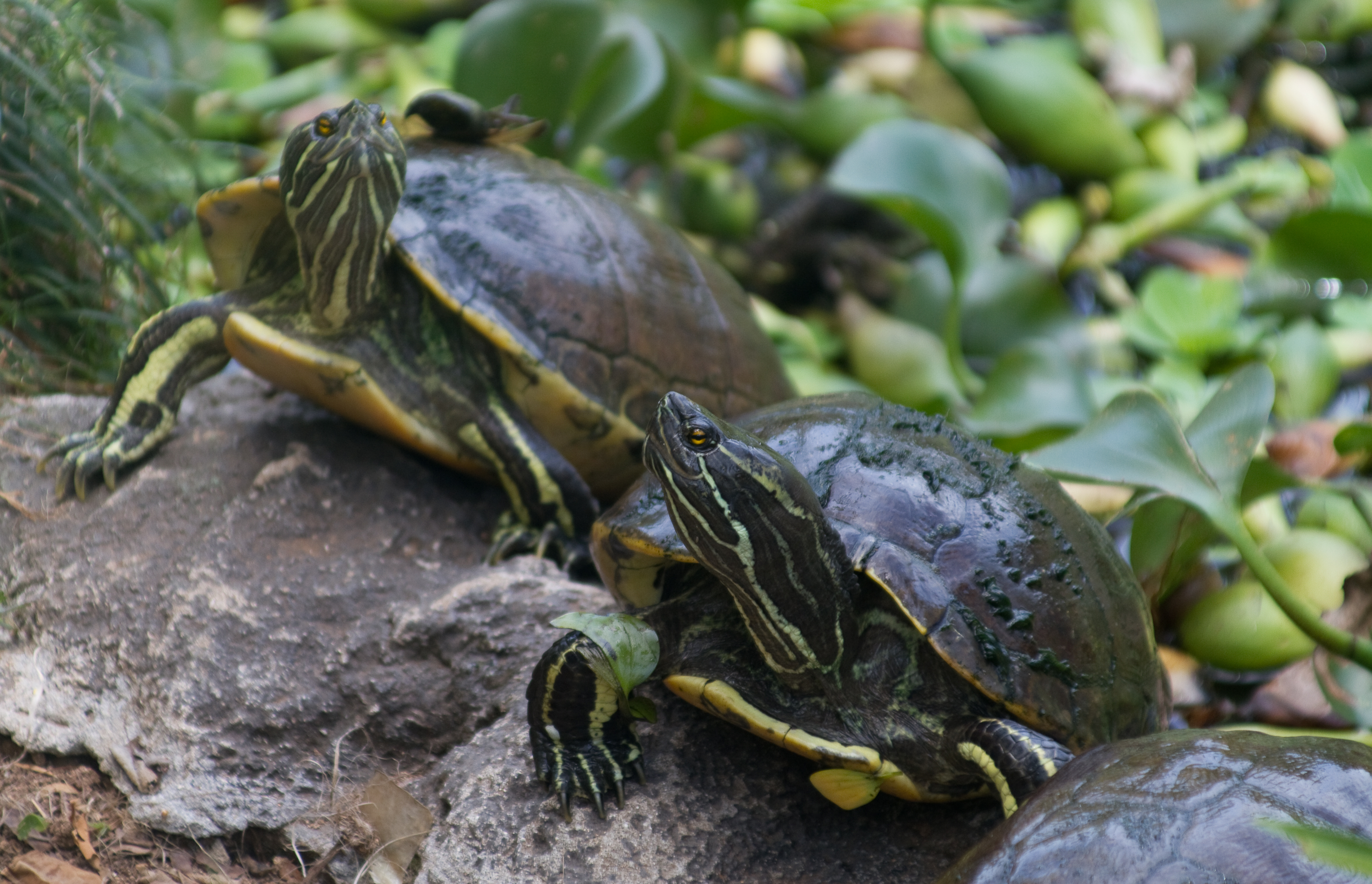

Conservation status
- Vulnerable (IUCN 2.3)

Scientific classification
- Kingdom: Animalia
- Phylum: Chordata
- Class: Reptilia
- Order: Testudines
- Suborder: Cryptodira
- Family: Emydidae
- Genus: Trachemys
- Species: T. decorata

Binomial name
- Trachemys decorata (Barbour & Carr, 1940)

Synonyms
- Pseudemys decorata Barbour & Carr, 1940; Pseudemys terrapen decorata — Mertens & Wermuth, 1955; Chrysemys (Trachemys) decorata — McDowell, 1964; Chrysemys terrapen decorata — Obst, 1983; Trachemys decorata — Seidel & Incháustegui, 1984; Trachemys stejnegeri decorata — Iverson, 1985

= Hispaniolan slider =

Species of reptile

The Hispaniolan slider (Trachemys decorata) or Haitian slider is a species of turtle in the family Emydidae found on the island of Hispaniola (Haiti and the Dominican Republic).

== Habitat ==
The Hispaniolan slider is a freshwater turtle. They can live on land and water, but prefer to be near freshwater.

== Conservation ==
These sliders are not on the endangered list, but are considered vulnerable.

== Diet ==
They have a particular diet that consists of insects (crickets), fish, vegetation, etc. When kept in captivity, they can eat all of the same foods that they would eat normally, as well as turtle pellets, carrots, tomatoes, peeled grapes, and spinach.

== Appearance ==
Unlike red-eared sliders, they do not have red patches on their heads. They have distinct light and dark stripes on their necks, feet, and tails. The tops of their shells are brown and the bottoms are yellow.
