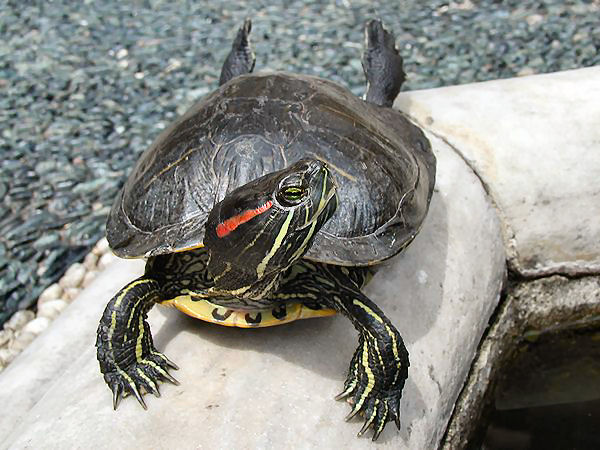
- Red-eared slider (Trachemys scripta elegans)

Scientific classification
- Kingdom: Animalia
- Phylum: Chordata
- Class: Reptilia
- Order: Testudines
- Suborder: Cryptodira
- Family: Emydidae
- Subfamily: Deirochelyinae
- Genus: Trachemys; Agassiz, 1857

Synonyms
- Calliclemys; Redemys

= Trachemys =

Trachemys Temporal range: Late Miocene–present

Genus of turtles

Trachemys is a genus of turtles belonging to the family Emydidae. Members of this genus are native to the Americas, ranging from the Midwestern United States south to northern Argentina, but one subspecies, the red-eared slider (T. scripta elegans), has been introduced worldwide. Species under this genus are commonly referred to as sliders.

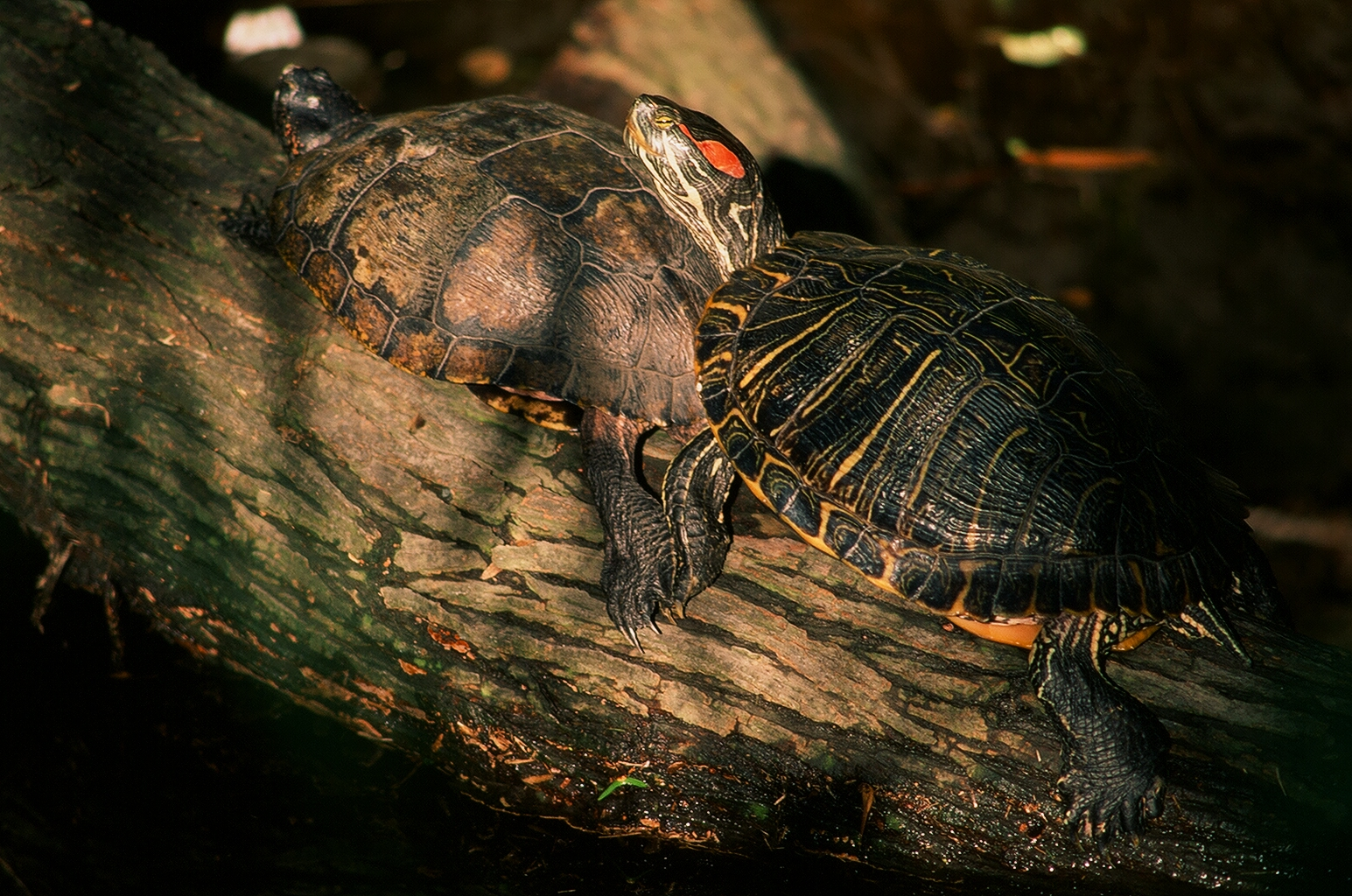
Two red-eared sliders basking at Captain Falcon Park in Corpus Christi, Texas (15 April 2016).

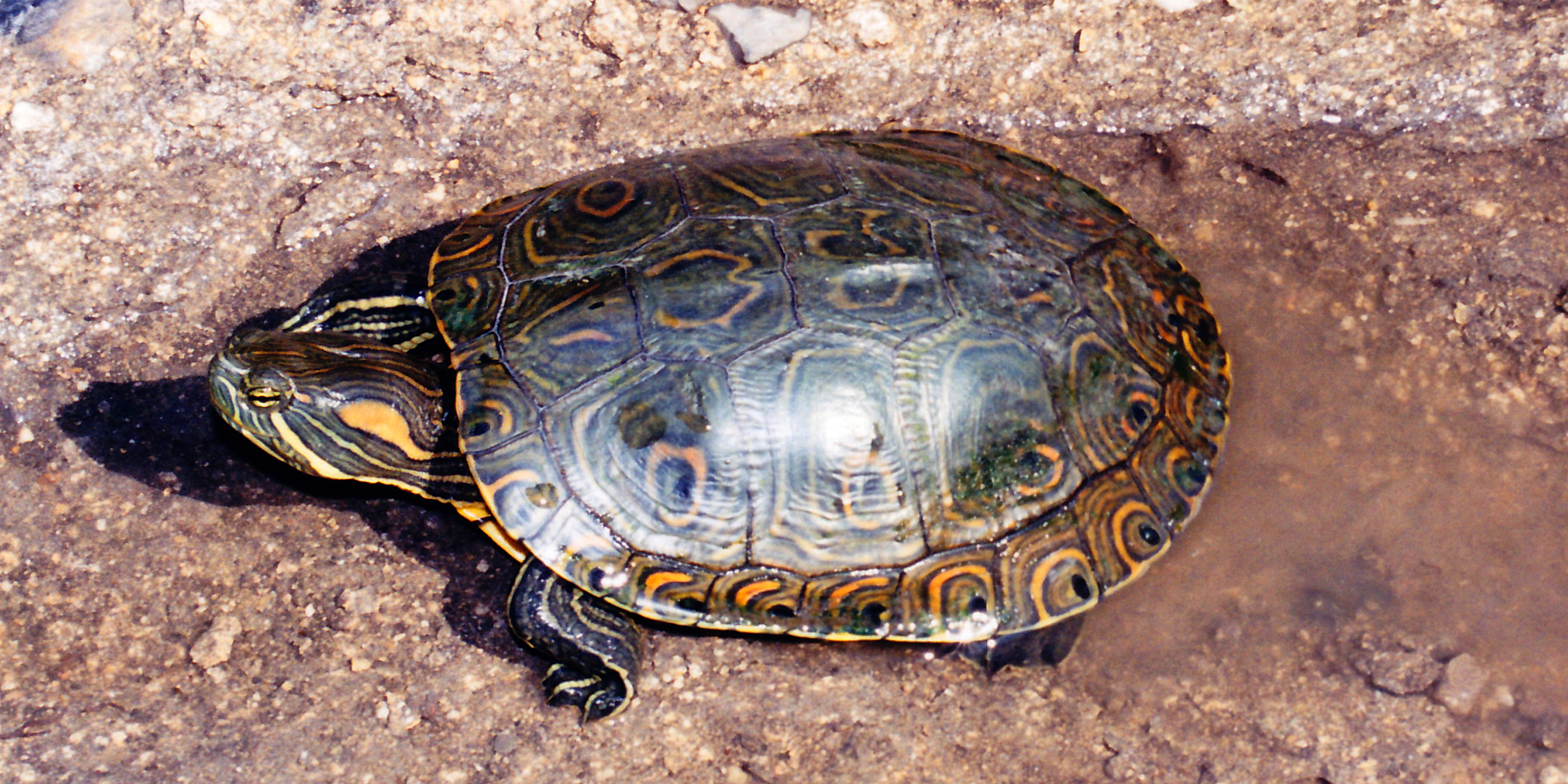
Mesoamerican slider (Trachemys venusta cataspila) in Tamaulipas, Mexico (22 September 2004).

== Species and subspecies ==
=== Extant ===
- Trachemys adiutrix Vanzolini, 1995 – Maranhão slider
- Trachemys callirostris (Gray, 1856) – Colombian slider
  - T. c. callirostris (Gray, 1856) – Colombian slider
  - T. c. chichiriviche (Pritchard & Trebbau, 1984) – Falcón slider
- Trachemys decorata (Barbour & Carr, 1940) – Hispaniolan slider
- Trachemys decussata (Bell, 1830) – Cuban slider
  - T. d. angusta (Barbour & Carr, 1940) – western Cuban slider
  - T. d. decussata (Bell, 1830) – eastern Cuban slider
- Trachemys dorbigni (A.M.C. Duméril & Bibron, 1835) – D'Orbigny's slider
- Trachemys emolli (Legler, 1990) – Nicaraguan slider
- Trachemys gaigeae (Hartweg, 1939) – Big Bend slider
- Trachemys hartwegi (Legler, 1990) – Nazas slider
- Trachemys medemi Vargas-Ramírez, del Valle, Ceballos & Fritz, 2017 – Atrato slider
- Trachemys nebulosa (Van Denburgh, 1895) – Baja California slider
  - T. n. hiltoni (Carr, 1942) – Fuerte slider
  - T. n. nebulosa (Van Denburgh, 1895) – Baja California slider
- Trachemys ornata (Gray, 1830) – ornate slider
- Trachemys scripta (Thunberg, 1792) – pond slider
  - T. s. elegans (Wied, 1839) – red-eared slider
  - T. s. scripta (Thunberg, 1792) – yellow-bellied slider
  - T. s. troostii (Holbrook, 1836) – Cumberland slider
- Trachemys stejnegeri (Schmidt, 1928) – Central Antillean slider
  - T. s. malonei (Barbour & Carr, 1938) – Inagua slider
  - T. s. stejnegeri (Schmidt, 1928) – Puerto Rican slider
  - T. s. vicina (Barbour & Carr, 1940) – Dominican slider
- Trachemys taylori (Legler, 1960) – Cuatro Ciénegas slider
- Trachemys terrapen (Bonnaterre, 1789) – Jamaican slider
- Trachemys venusta (Gray, 1856) – Meso-American slider
  - T. v. cataspila (Günther, 1885) – Huasecan slider
  - T. v. grayi (Bocourt, 1868) – Gray's slider or Tehuantepec slider
  - T. v. iversoni McCord, Joseph-Ouni, Hagen & Blanck, 2010 – Yucatan slider
  - T. v. panamensis McCord, Joseph-Ouni, Hagen & Blanck, 2010 – Panamanian slider
  - T. v. uhrigi McCord, Joseph-Ouni, Hagen & Blanck, 2010 – Uhrig's slider
  - T. v. venusta (Gray, 1856) – Belize slider
- Trachemys yaquia (Legler & Webb, 1970) – Yaqui slider

Nota bene: In the above list, a binomial authority or a trinomial authority in parentheses indicates that the species or subspecies was originally described in a genus other than Trachemys.

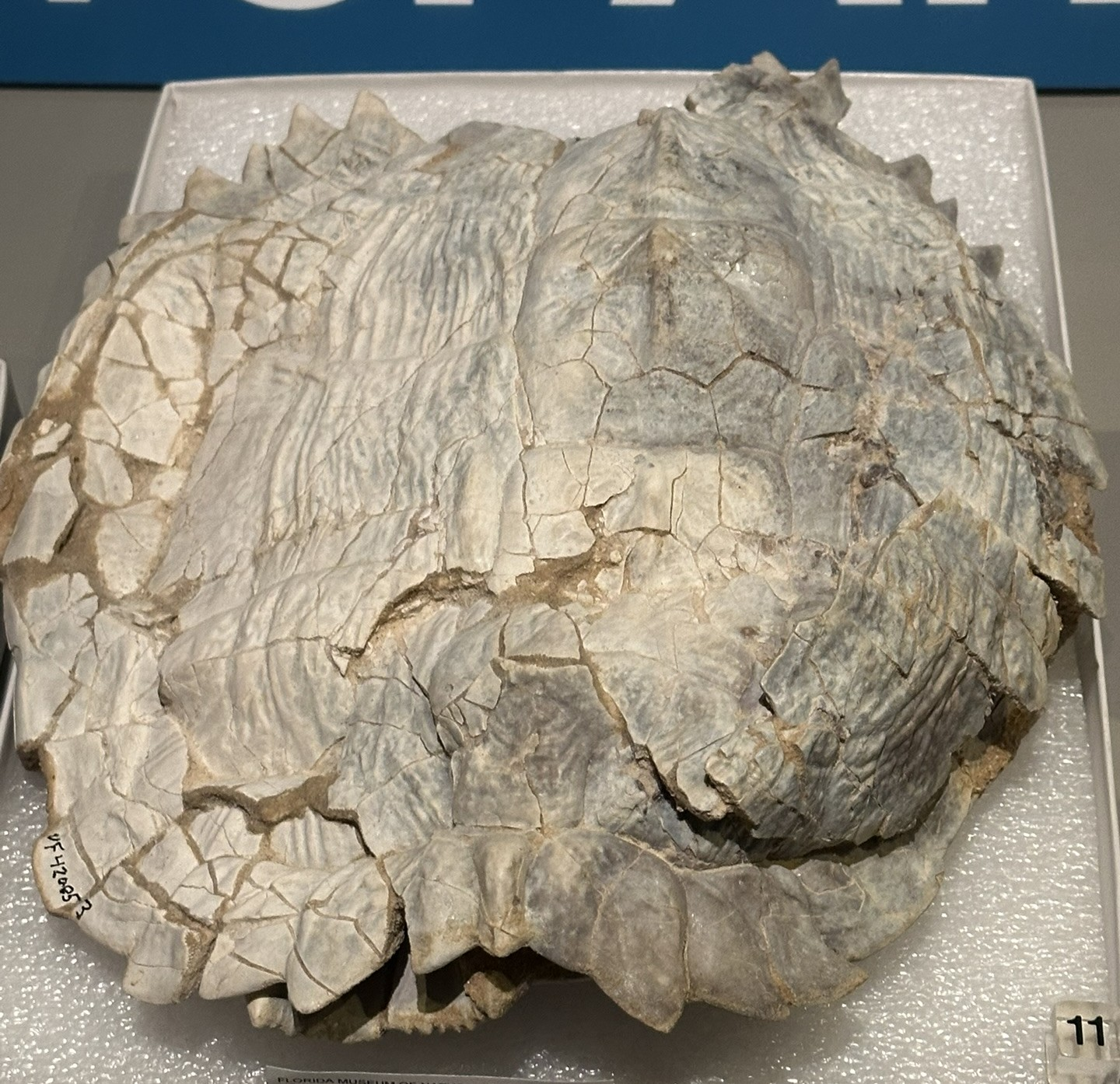
Fossil shell of T. inflata, Florida Museum of Natural History

=== Fossil ===
- † Trachemys inflata Weaver & Robertson, 1967 - inflated slider turtle
- † Trachemys haugrudi Jasinski, 2018 - Haugrud's slider turtle
