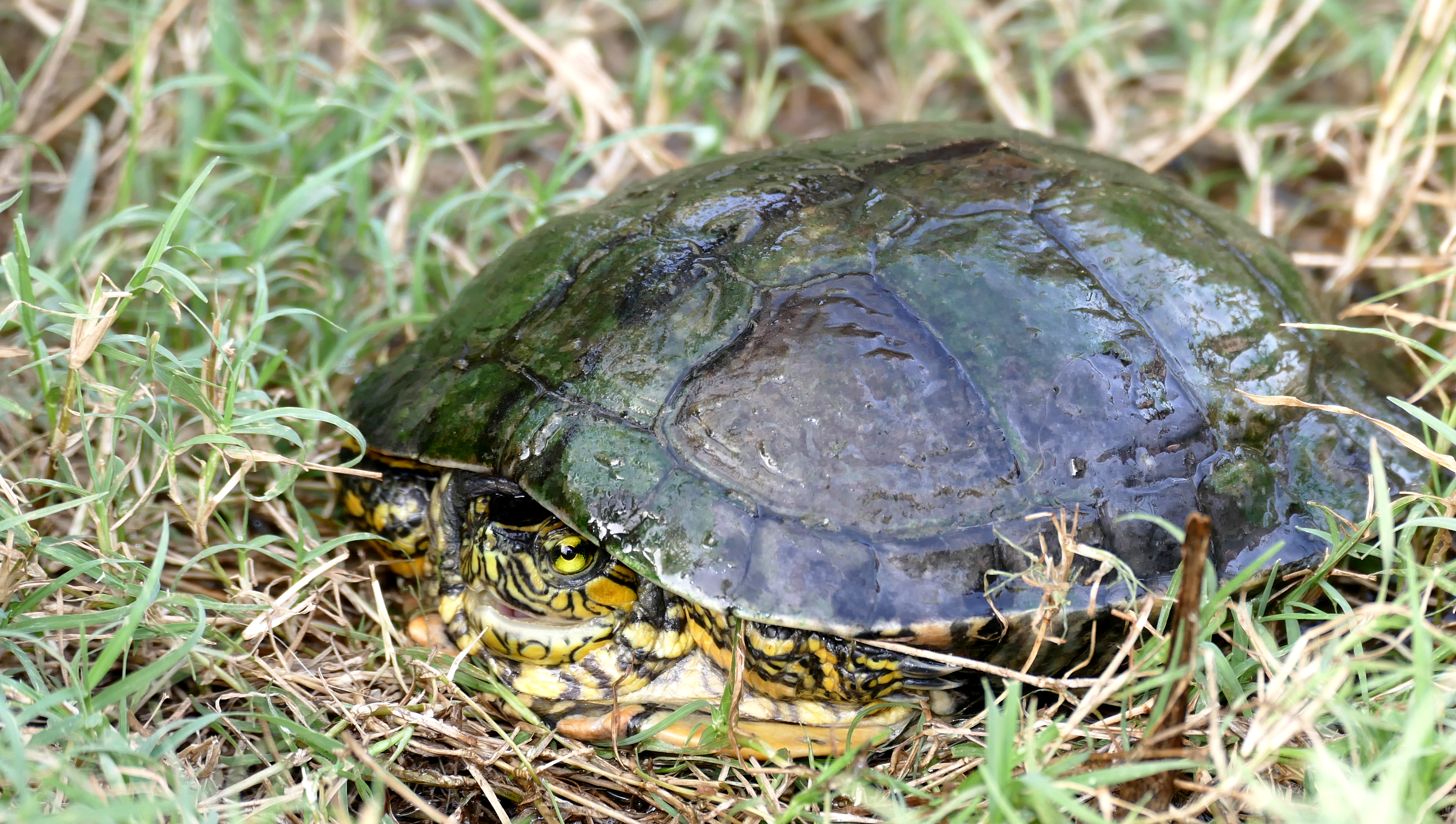

Conservation status
- Endangered (IUCN 2.3)

Scientific classification
- Kingdom: Animalia
- Phylum: Chordata
- Class: Reptilia
- Order: Testudines
- Suborder: Cryptodira
- Family: Emydidae
- Genus: Trachemys
- Species: T. adiutrix

Binomial name
- Trachemys adiutrix Vanzolini, 1995
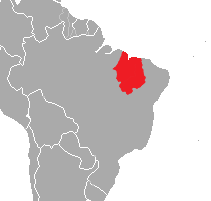

Synonyms
- Trachemys aduitrix Vanzolini, 1995 (ex errore)

= Maranhão slider =

Species of turtle

The Maranhão slider (Trachemys adiutrix), also known commonly as the Brazilian slider, or Carvalho's slider, is a species of turtle in the family Emydidae. The turtle is endemic to coastal areas in northeastern Brazil.

== Taxonomy and etymology ==
The first description of the species was published by Paulo E. Vanzolini in 1995. The type locality was given as Santo Amaro do Maranhão, close to the western border of the Lençóis Maranhenses National Park; the holotype was collected by Vanzolini and his field companion, Maria do Socorro Pinheiro, in March 1993.

The specific name adiutrix, which is the Latin feminine form of helper, is in honor of Socorro Pinheiro, whose surname Socorro means help in Portuguese.

The common name Carvalho's slider is in honor of Brazilian herpetologist Antenor Leitão de Carvalho.

T. adiutrix has no recognized subspecies of its own, but is itself sometimes considered a subspecies of T. dorbigni (T. dorbigni adiutrix), a species that which may have been introduced to northeastern Brazil.

== Description ==
T. adiutrix is variable in size, males have a carapace length of 99.1–185.5 cm (39.0–73.0 in) and a plastron length of 88.7–156.2 cm (34.9–61.5 in), while females have a carapace length of 101.5–250.6 cm (40.0–98.7 in) and a plastron length of 101.0–201.6 cm (39.8–79.4 in).

The carapace has starts out green and with yellow to red patterns, but as the turtle ages the carapace darkens and turns brown. The seams of the carapace are dark brown or black, while the rim is yellow-white to yellow, and has a slightly serrated posterior. The plastron is flat and yellow, with a pattern of thick dark lines.

Similarly to the carapace, the skin of the turtle starts out with a green shade that darkens as the turtle ages, becoming olive to brown, and is also marked by yellow-white to yellow stripes on the tail, legs, throat and neck. The skin on the relatively large head of the turtle is dark olive to brown on top and a lighter colour on the bottom.

Males have narrower, more protuding snouts and bigger tails than females, who have broader heads.

== Distribution and habitat ==
Trachemys adiutrix is endemic to the coastal areas of Maranhão and Piauí, in northeastern Brazil.
