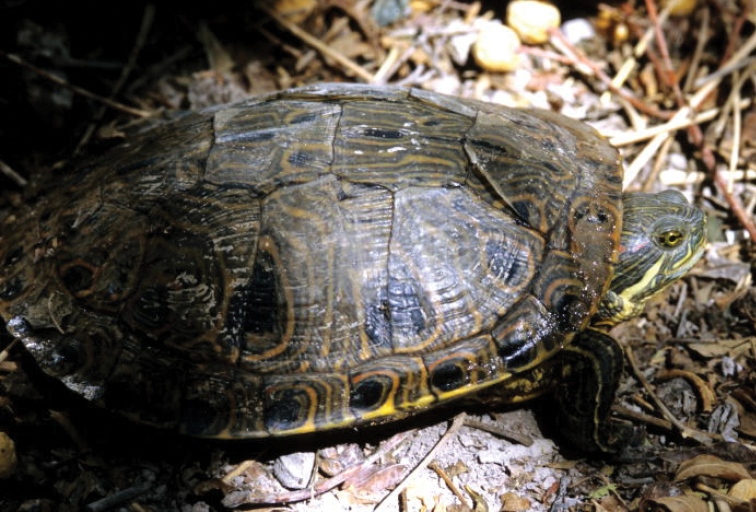

Conservation status
- Endangered (IUCN 3.1)

Scientific classification
- Kingdom: Animalia
- Phylum: Chordata
- Class: Reptilia
- Order: Testudines
- Suborder: Cryptodira
- Family: Emydidae
- Genus: Trachemys
- Species: T. taylori

Binomial name
- Trachemys taylori (Legler, 1960)

Synonyms
- Pseudemys scripta taylori Legler, 1960; Chrysemys scripta taylori — H.M. Smith & Taylor, 1966; Chrysemys gaigeae taylori — Weaver & Rose, 1967; Chrysemys taylori — Weaver & Rose, 1967; Trachemys scripta taylori — Iverson, 1985; Trachemys nebulosa taylori — Fritz, 1995; Trachemys ornata taylori — Walls, 1996; Trachemys taylori — Seidel, 2002

= Cuatro Ciénegas slider =

Species of turtle

The Cuatro Ciénegas slider (Trachemys taylori), also known commonly as la jicotea de Cuatrociénegas in Spanish, is a species of turtle belonging to the genus Trachemys of the family Emydidae. The species is native to northeastern Mexico.

== Etymology ==
The specific name, taylori, is in honor of American herpetologist Edward Harrison Taylor.

== Geographic range ==
T. taylori is endemic to the Cuatro Ciénegas Basin in Coahuila state, Mexico.

== Habitat ==
The preferred natural habitat of T. taylori is freshwater wetlands.

== Conservation status ==
T. taylori is an endangered species.
