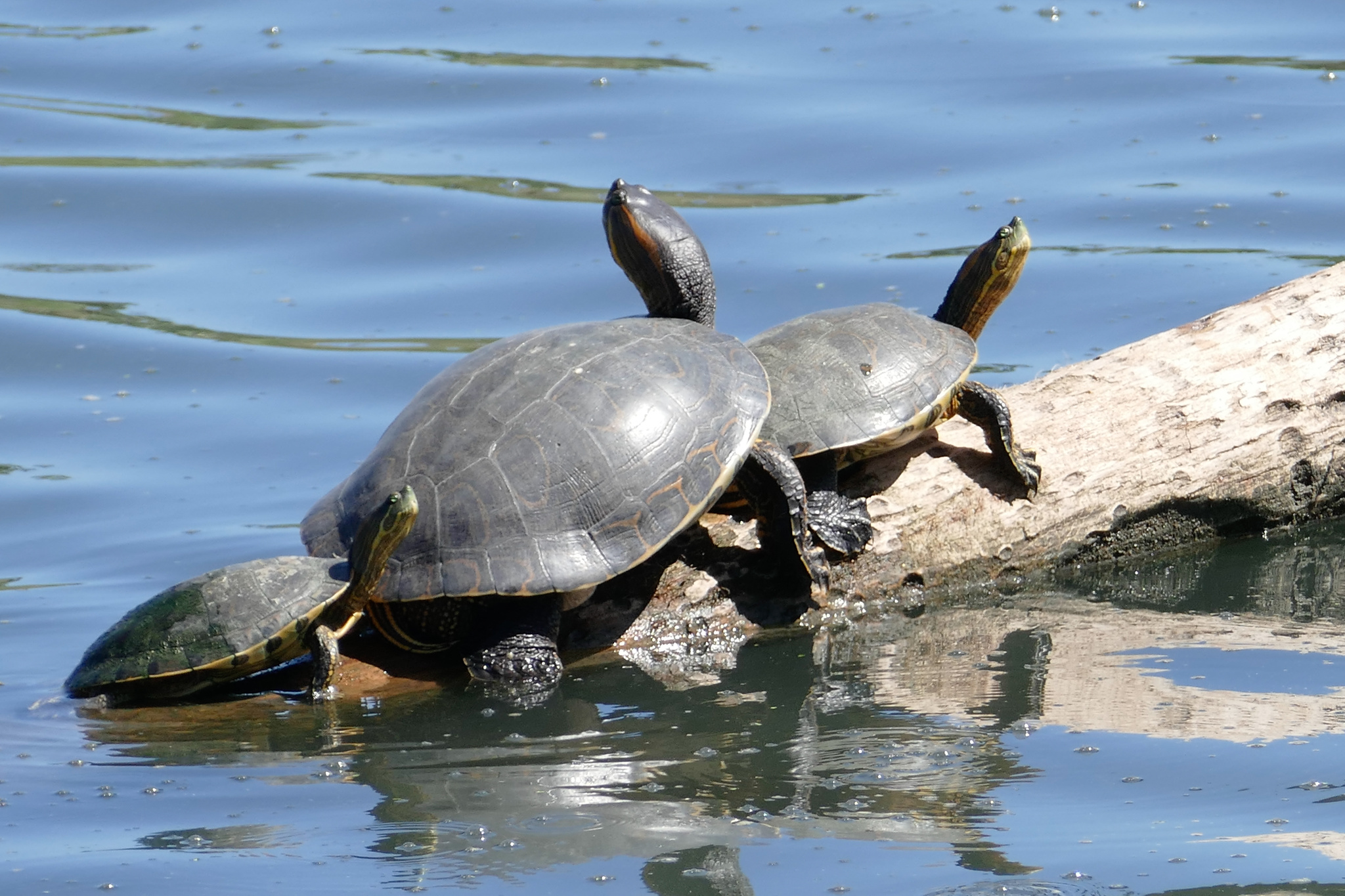

Scientific classification
- Kingdom: Animalia
- Phylum: Chordata
- Class: Reptilia
- Order: Testudines
- Suborder: Cryptodira
- Family: Emydidae
- Genus: Trachemys
- Species: T. nebulosa

Binomial name
- Trachemys nebulosa (Van Denburgh, 1895)

Synonyms
- List Trachemys nebulosa nebulosa: Chrysemys nebulosa Van Denburgh, 1895; Chrysemys ornata nebulosa Siebenrock, 1909; Pseudemys ornata nebulosa Stejneger & Barbour, 1917; Pseudemys nebulosa Van Denburgh & Slevin, 1921; Pseudemys scripta nebulosa Carr, 1942; Chrysemys scripta nebulosa Smith & Taylor, 1966; Trachemys scripta nebulosa Iverson, 1985; Trachemys dorbigni nebulosa Obst, 1996; Trachemys ornata nebulosa Walls, 1996; Trachemys nebulosa Wilms, 1999; Trachemys nebulosa nebulosa Bringsøe, 2001; Trachemys nebulosa hiltoni: Pseudemys scripta hiltoni Carr, 1942; Pseudemys concinna hiltoni Wermuth & Mertens, 1961; Chrysemys scripta hiltoni Smith & Taylor, 1966; Chrysemys gaigeae hiltoni Weaver & Rose, 1967; Trachemys scripta hiltoni Iverson, 1985; Trachemys ornata hiltoni Walls, 1996; Trachemys nebulosa hiltoni Bringsøe, 2001

= Baja California slider =

Species of turtle

The Baja California slider (Trachemys nebulosa), also known as the black-bellied slider, is a turtle in the family Emydidae. It is native to Baja California, Sinaloa and Sonora in Mexico.

== Taxonomy ==
There are two subspecies recognised:

- Trachemys nebulosa nebulosa – from Baja California.
- Trachemys nebulosa hiltoni Fuerte slider – from Sinaloa and Sonoro.

== Description ==
The Baja California slider is a medium-sized turtle and identified for their clawed digits, non-elephantine hind limbs and a wide-colored suborbital patch. They have smooth shells, rounded posteriorly and straight interiorly. These shells are longer than they are wide, have a low later profile and can reach up to 37 cm (14.5 inches) in length. On the ventral side of the shell is yellow with symmetrical black markings. Dorsally the shell is dark in color with the vertebral, costal and marginal scutes having dark black spots surrounded by lighter margins. The Baja California slider has a large, triangular shaped head which is covered by smooth skin. They have protruding non-hooked snouts where the nostrils are located decently high and large eyes. The top of the head is olive colored with indistinct pale lines while the chin and throat are lighter with central yellow markings; there is a pair of yellow stripes that extend anteriorly across the local jaw and onto the upper jaw. Their tails are moderately long while male's tails being longer than females. The bodies are covered with multiple yellow stripes including the forelimbs, not the hind limbs.

== Distribution and habitat ==
The Baja California slider has an exceedingly limited geographic range, currently found from San Ignacio southward into Baja California Sur. They were endemic only to the Río San José basin in the greater Cabo San Lucas area (where they are now exceedingly rare due to over fishing) but as early as the late 1700s they were transported northwards by natives to provide a continuing food source.

They prefer larger bodies of water with muddy bottoms, often seen basking on emerged rocks or floating logs. Most activity takes place between mid-March and October as well as the winter months by burying themselves into the mud.

== Status ==
They are still consumed today in the remote areas of Baja by native people. Although they are extremely wary of humans being very difficult to approach and are high maintenance, they make good house pets.
