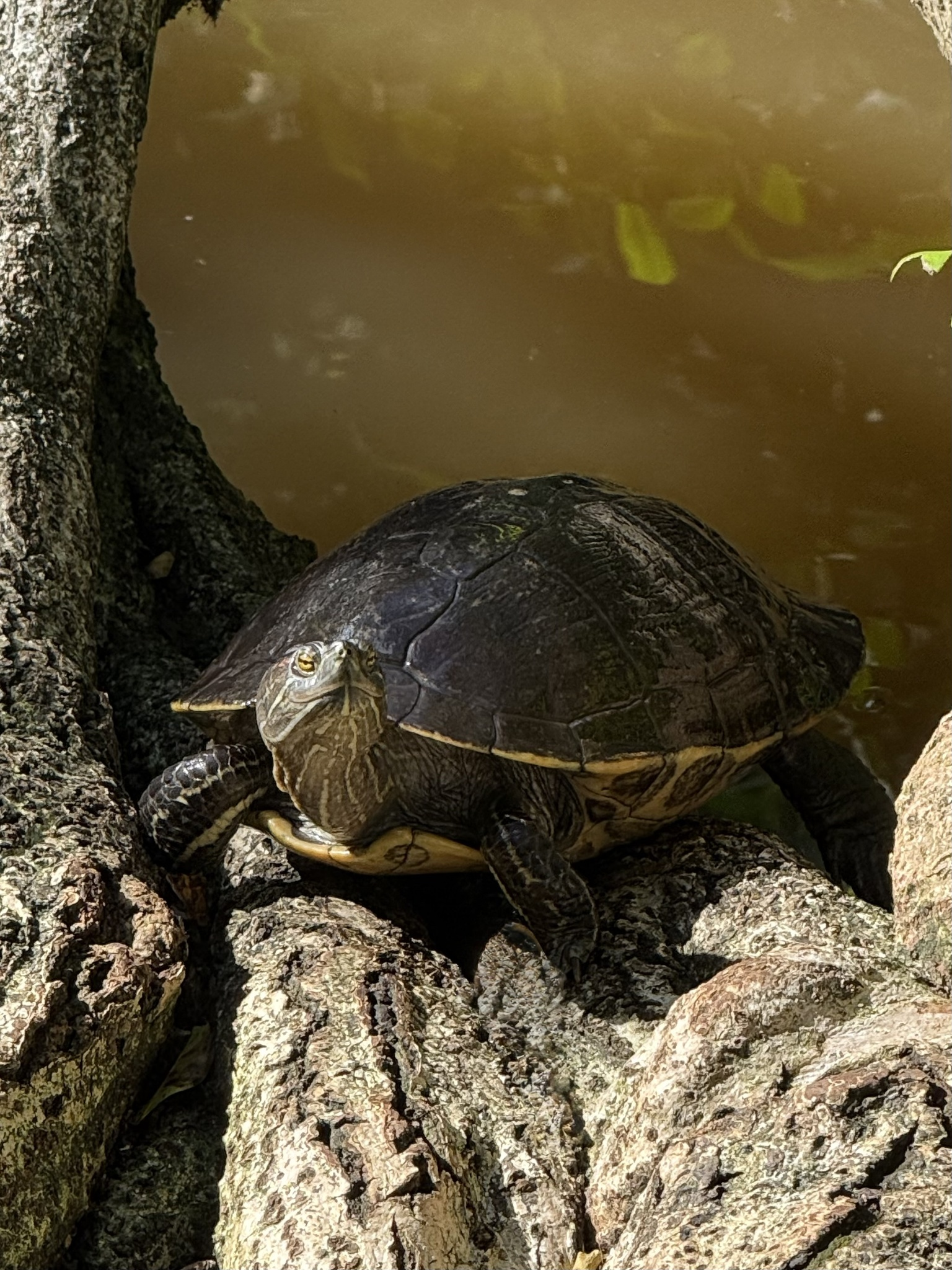
- seen in Bávaro

Conservation status
- Near Threatened (IUCN 2.3)

Scientific classification
- Kingdom: Animalia
- Phylum: Chordata
- Class: Reptilia
- Order: Testudines
- Suborder: Cryptodira
- Family: Emydidae
- Genus: Trachemys
- Species: T. stejnegeri
- Subspecies: T. s. vicina

Trinomial name
- Trachemys stejnegeri vicina (Barbour & Carr, 1940)

= Dominican slider =

Subspecies of turtle

The Dominican slider (Trachemys stejnegeri vicina) is a subspecies of turtle in the family Emydidae. It is endemic to the island of Hispaniola (split between the Dominican Republic and Haiti).
