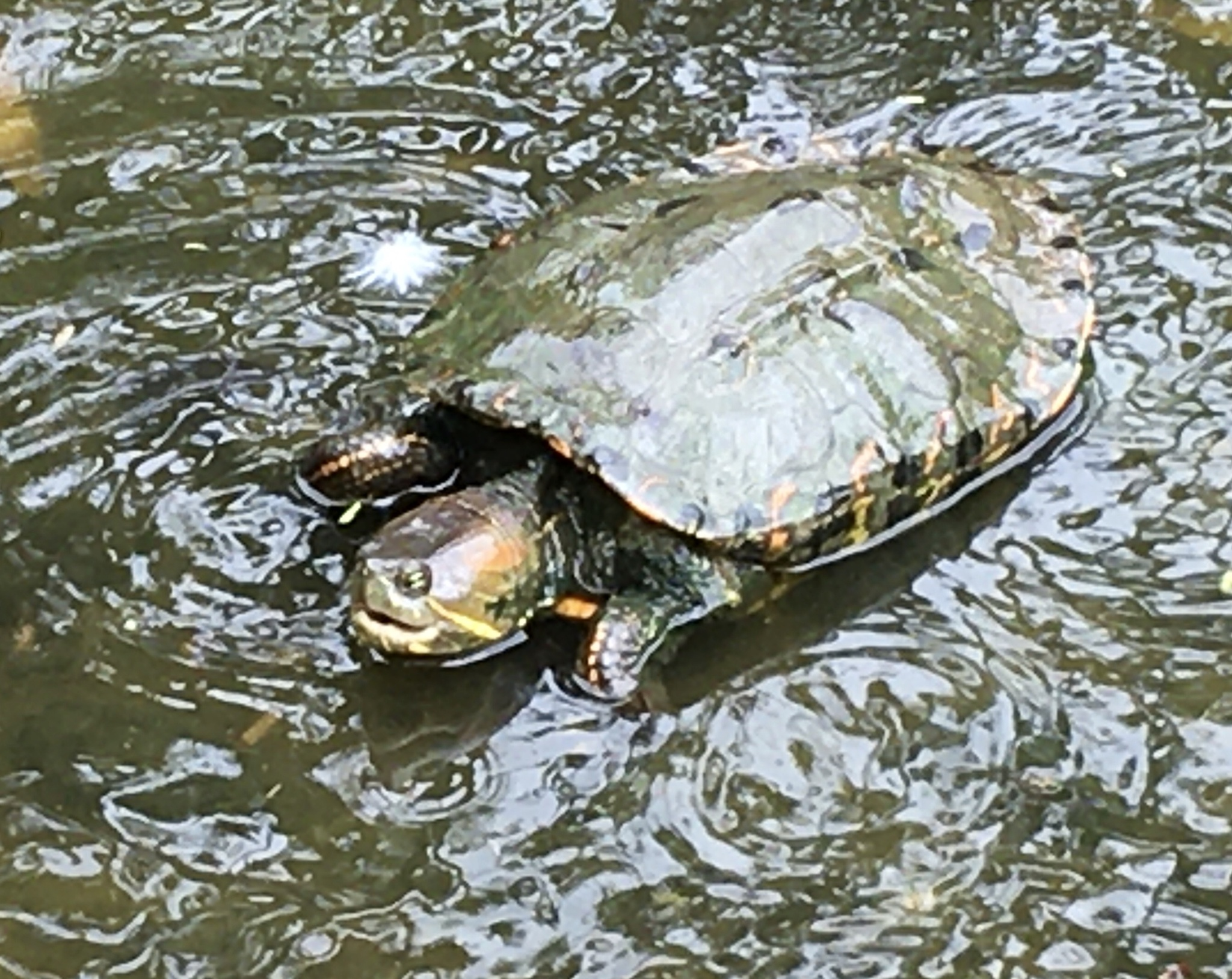

Conservation status
- Not evaluated (IUCN 2.3)

Scientific classification
- Kingdom: Animalia
- Phylum: Chordata
- Class: Reptilia
- Order: Testudines
- Suborder: Cryptodira
- Family: Emydidae
- Genus: Trachemys
- Species: T. callirostris

Binomial name
- Trachemys callirostris (Gray, 1856)

Synonyms
- List Trachemys callirostris callirostris: Emys callirostris Gray, 1856; Emys callorostris Gray, 1856 (ex errore); Callichelys callirostris Gray, 1863; Pseudemys callirostris Cope, 1887; Chrysemys ornata var. callirostris Boulenger, 1889; Pseudemys scripta callirostris Williams, 1956; Pseudemys ornata callirostris Wermuth & Mertens, 1961; Chrysemys callirostris Weaver & Rose, 1967; Chrysemys scripta callirostris Weaver & Rose, 1967; Trachemys scripta callirostris Iverson, 1985; Trachemys callirostris Seidel & Jackson, 1990; Trachemys ascita callirostris Tafur & Tapias, 1993; Trachemys ornata callirostris Vanzolini, 1995; Trachemys dorbigni callirostris Obst, 1996; Trachemys callirostris callirostris Seidel, 2002; Trachemys callirostris chichiriviche: Pseudemys scripta chichiriviche Pritchard & Trebbau, 1984; Trachemys scripta chichiriviche Iverson, 1985; Trachemys ornata chichiriviche Vanzolini, 1995; Trachemys callirostris chichiriviche Seidel, 2002

= Trachemys callirostris =

Species of turtle

Trachemys callirostris is a species of turtle in the family Emydidae found in Colombia and Venezuela. The species is divided into two subspecies: the Colombian slider (T. c. callirostris) and the Venezuelan slider (T. c. chichiriviche), both of which are found in watersheds draining into the Caribbean Sea.

== Taxonomy ==
The first description of the species was published by John Edward Gray in 1856, then under the name Emys callirostris. The species has since then undergone numerous reclassifications, being placed into the genus Trachemys by John B. Iverson in 1985, but then as a subspecies of the Pond slider. Michael E. Seidel classified the turtle as its own species in 2002, which was the first usage of the combination Trachemys callirostris. The name callirostris is derived from kallion, meaning beautiful in Greek, and rostrum, meaning snout in Latin.

There are two recognized subspecies: the Colombian slider (T. c. callirostris) and the Venezuelan slider (T. c. chichiriviche). The name chichiriviche is derived from the name of the hill in Falcón, Venezuela, where the first recorded specimen of the subspecies was found.

== Description ==
The carapace of the turtle's shell grows to 19–30 cm (7.5–11.8 in) in males and 19–33 cm (7.5–13.0 in) in females. It is highest near its center and widest further toward the posterior of the turtle, where it is also slightly serrated. The carapace can be green, olive or brown, and on each pleural there is a yellow to reddish circle with a dark spot in the middle of it, with the circle and the spot being interspaced with the regular color of the carapace. The plastron is yellow to very light brown, with an intricate pattern of dark lines across the entirety of it. The head of the turtle has yellow lines and a splotch behind the ears, similarly to Trachemys scripta.

== Distribution and habitat ==
The two subspecies are found in two geographically discontiguous areas of Colombia and Venezuela. The Colombian slider is endemic to a part of the Caribbean Sea's drainage basin that is centered on the lower sections of the Magdalena River and the Cauca River. Most of its range is in northern Colombia, but a part of it is in Zulia, Venezuela, on the western shore of Lake Maracaibo. The Venezuelan slider is endemic to the coastal watersheds between the Tocuyo River and Morón River, spanning the Venezuelan states of Falcón, Yaracuy and Carabobo. The turtles lives in slow rivers, lakes, swamps, and ponds, in areas with floating vegetation and logs to bask on, and they can to some extent tolerate brackish water.
