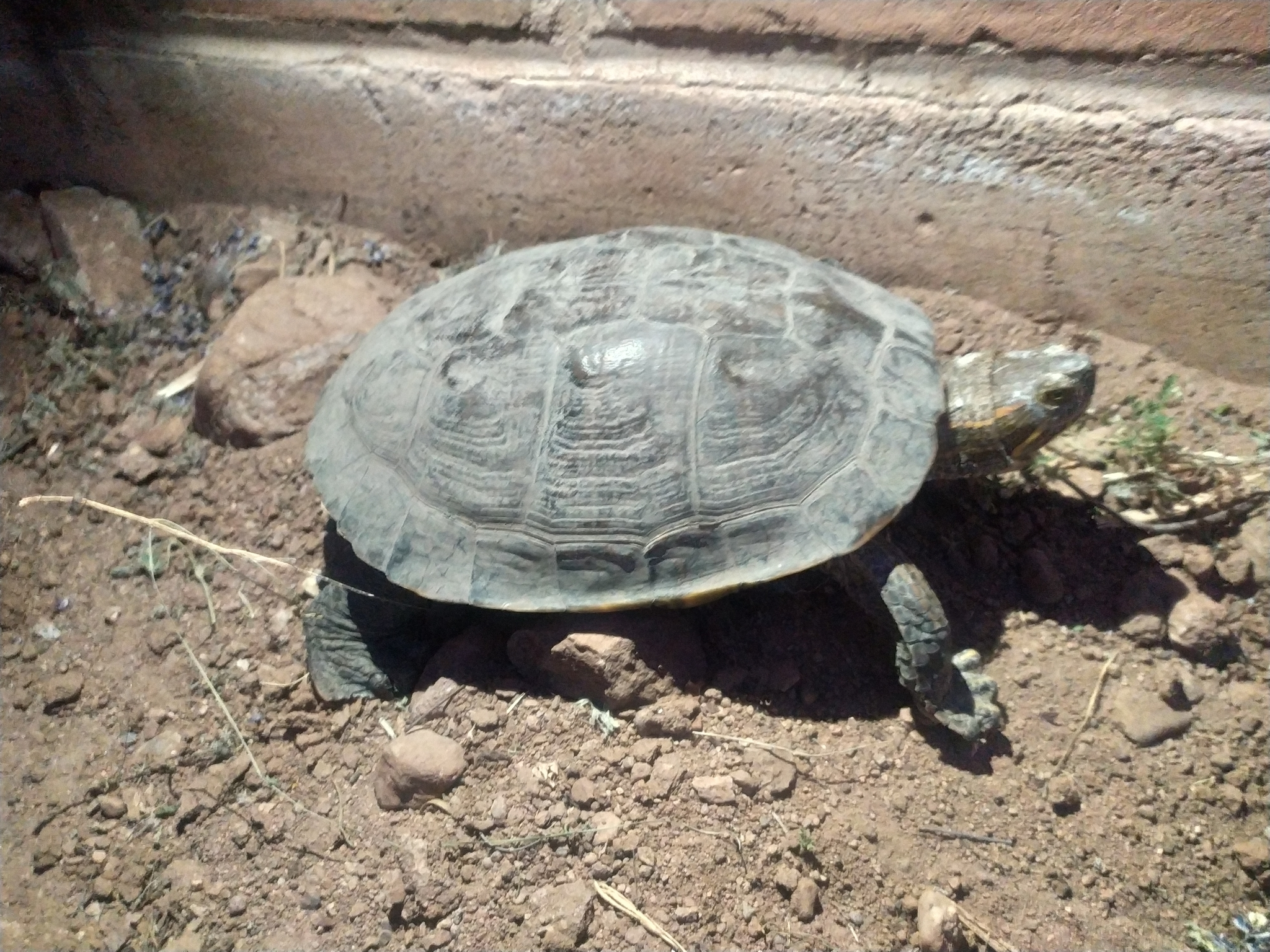

Conservation status
- Vulnerable (IUCN 3.1)

Scientific classification
- Kingdom: Animalia
- Phylum: Chordata
- Class: Reptilia
- Order: Testudines
- Suborder: Cryptodira
- Family: Emydidae
- Genus: Trachemys
- Species: T. yaquia

Binomial name
- Trachemys yaquia (Legler and Webb, 1970)

Synonyms
- Pseudemys scripta yaquia Legler & Webb, 1970; Chrysemys scripta yaquia Smith & Smith, 1975; Pseudemys ornata yaquia Wermuth & Mertens, 1977; Chrysemys scripta yaqui Plymale, Jackson & Collier, 1978 (ex errore); Trachemys scripta yaquia Iverson, 1985; Trachemys dorbigni yaquia Obst, 1996; Trachemys ornata yaquia Walls, 1996; Trachemys yaquia Seidel, 2002

= Yaqui slider =

Species of turtle

The Yaqui slider (Trachemys yaquia) is a species of turtle belonging to the genus Trachemys of the family Emydidae. It is native to Chihuahua and Sonora in northwestern Mexico.

== Subspecies ==
- No subspecies
