= Puerto Rican slider =

Conservation status
- Near Threatened (IUCN 2.3)

Scientific classification
- Kingdom: Animalia
- Phylum: Chordata
- Class: Reptilia
- Order: Testudines
- Suborder: Cryptodira
- Family: Emydidae
- Genus: Trachemys
- Species: T. stejnegeri
- Subspecies: T. s. stejnegeri

Trinomial name
- Trachemys stejnegeri stejnegeri (Schmidt, 1928)

Subspecies of reptile

The Puerto Rican slider (Trachemys stejnegeri stejnegeri) is a subspecies of turtle found mainly in Puerto Rico and surrounding areas. It is a relative of the pond slider.
