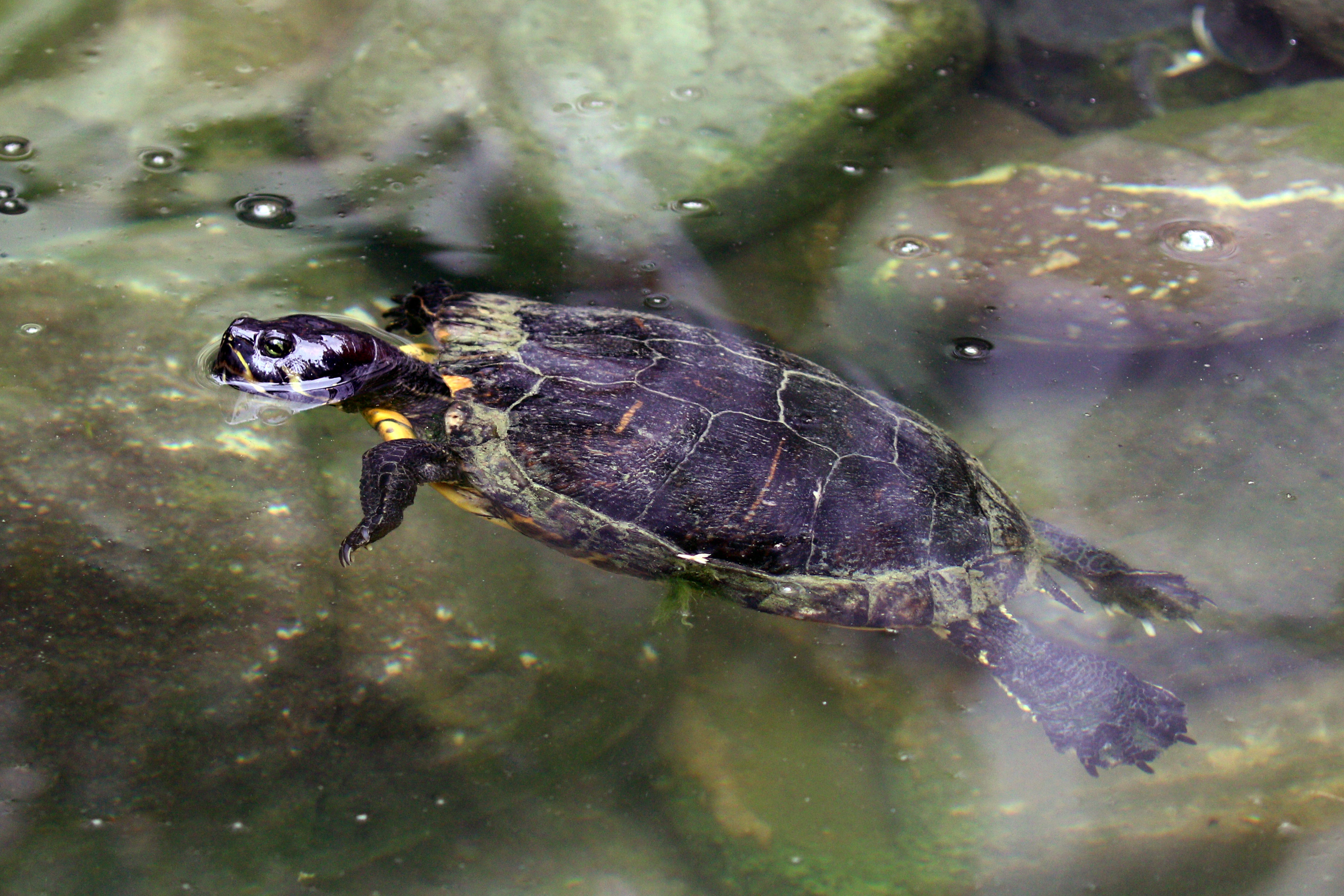
- In Jamaica

Conservation status
- Vulnerable (IUCN 3.1)

Scientific classification
- Kingdom: Animalia
- Phylum: Chordata
- Class: Reptilia
- Order: Testudines
- Suborder: Cryptodira
- Family: Emydidae
- Genus: Trachemys
- Species: T. Terrepen

Binomial name
- Trachemys Terrepen (Bonnaterre, 1789)

Subspecies
- T. terrapen felis T. terrapen terrapen

Synonyms
- Testudo terrapen Lacépède, 1788; Testudo palustris Gmelin, 1789; Emys rugosa Gray, 1831; Emys rugosa var. livida Gray, 1831; Clemmys rugosa Strauch, 1862; Chrysemys scripta var. rugosa Boulenger, 1889; Trachemys palustris Baur, 1893; Pseudemys palustris Stejneger, 1904; Chrysemys scripta palustris Siebenrock, 1909; Pseudemys palustris palustris Mertens, Müller & Rust, 1934; Pseudemys felis Barbour, 1935; Pseudemys palustris felis Mertens, 1939; Pseudemys terrapen Barbour & Carr, 1940; Pseudemys terrapen felis Mertens & Wermuth, 1955; Pseudemys terrapen terrapen Mertens & Wermuth, 1955; Chrysemys (Trachemys) terrapen McDowell, 1964; Chrysemys terrapin Weaver & Rose, 1967 (ex errore); Chrysemys decussata felis Schwartz, 1968; Chrysemys felis Schwartz, 1968; Chrysemys terrapen felis Obst, 1983; Chrysemys terrapen terrapen Obst, 1983; Trachemys terrapen Seidel & Incháustegui, 1984; Trachemys terrapen felis Iverson, 1985; Trachemys terrapen terrapen Iverson, 1985; Trachemys felis Seidel & Adkins, 1987

= Jamaican slider =

Species of turtle

The Jamaican slider (Trachemys terrapen), also known as the Cat Island slider, is a species of fresh water turtle in the family Emydidae. It is found in the Bahamas (where it is introduced) and Jamaica. As it is not currently found on any of the other surrounding islands in the region, it is assumed that the Jamaican slider was introduced from one of these countries to the other. Even though the popular theory was that these turtles originated from Jamaica, current geological evidence may suggest that they were in the Bahamas long before the Indigenous Lucayans first went to the Bahamian islands. There is also evidence from archeological sites on San Salvador that the Lucayans ate these turtles and transplanted them around the West Indies.

== Description ==
Jamaican sliders are freshwater turtles of moderate size. Males average at 200 millimetres (7.9 in) carapace length (CL) and females are larger at 270 millimetres (11 in) CL. The adults are a dark brown to olive colour with very faint markings. The juveniles are more clearly marked and these markings apparently disappear within the first three years.

== Diet ==
Typical omnivores, feeding on a variety of fruits particularly Pond-apple (Annona glabra) and other vegetation, small fish, snails, frogs, aquatic invertebrates, carrion and may even attack young birds if left defenseless. However, fecal samples have shown that aquatic algae form the bulk of their diet.

== Habitat ==
These are freshwater turtles, inhabiting most fresh to brackish wetlands throughout their range. This includes swamps, streams and ponds, even ephemeral or temporary ponds.

== Distribution ==
The Jamaican slider is found in many different areas on the island of Jamaica and on a few islands in the Bahamas. In the Bahamas, about 60% of its population can be found on Cat Island (which is why it is known as the Cat Island slider in the Bahamas) and smaller populations can also be found on the islands of Eleuthera, Andros Island, Exumas and New Providence. However, the population on New Providence (and nearby Paradise Island) and Exuma is a hybrid between the red-eared slider (T. scripta elegans) and the Inagua slider (T. stejnegeri malonei) from Great Inagua.

== Reproduction ==
Breeding season in Jamaican stocks can run from February to September. The Bahamian stocks may have a more limited or reduced breeding season due to the limited availability of freshwater. Clutch size has been observed from both countries to be 3–8 eggs and the turtles can lay 3–4 clutches per year. The last clutch is always smaller in size than the first.

== Uses ==
These turtles were consumed by the Lucayans who lived in these regions. It is known that they are also eaten in the Bahamas, though this practice is declining. On islands such as Cat Island these turtles have also been kept as pets typically in wells and are referred to affectionately on that island as "Peter".

== Status and conservation ==
The Jamaican slider is listed as Vulnerable in the 2007 IUCN Red List but is not currently listed under CITES. The populations in both Jamaica and the Bahamas are largely effected by introduced predators to those islands. These include dogs, cats, raccoons, rats, pigs and mongooses. In the Bahamas, habitat loss is an ever-increasing threat to the Jamaican Slider and this includes Cat Island. On many islands in the Bahamas, freshwater is relatively scarce and therefore the contamination of freshwater ponds with saltwater particularly after hurricanes, has a devastating effect. However, in the Bahamas, the biggest cause for concern is the continued importation of the red-eared slider for the pet trade. They are very popular as pets in the Bahamas but once the animal has out grown its welcome they are released into nearby ponds. The island of New Providence, and nearby Paradise Island, have very diluted stocks and this is possibly true for some of the other islands also. It is known, however, that the red-eared slider has not been released onto Cat Island to date.
