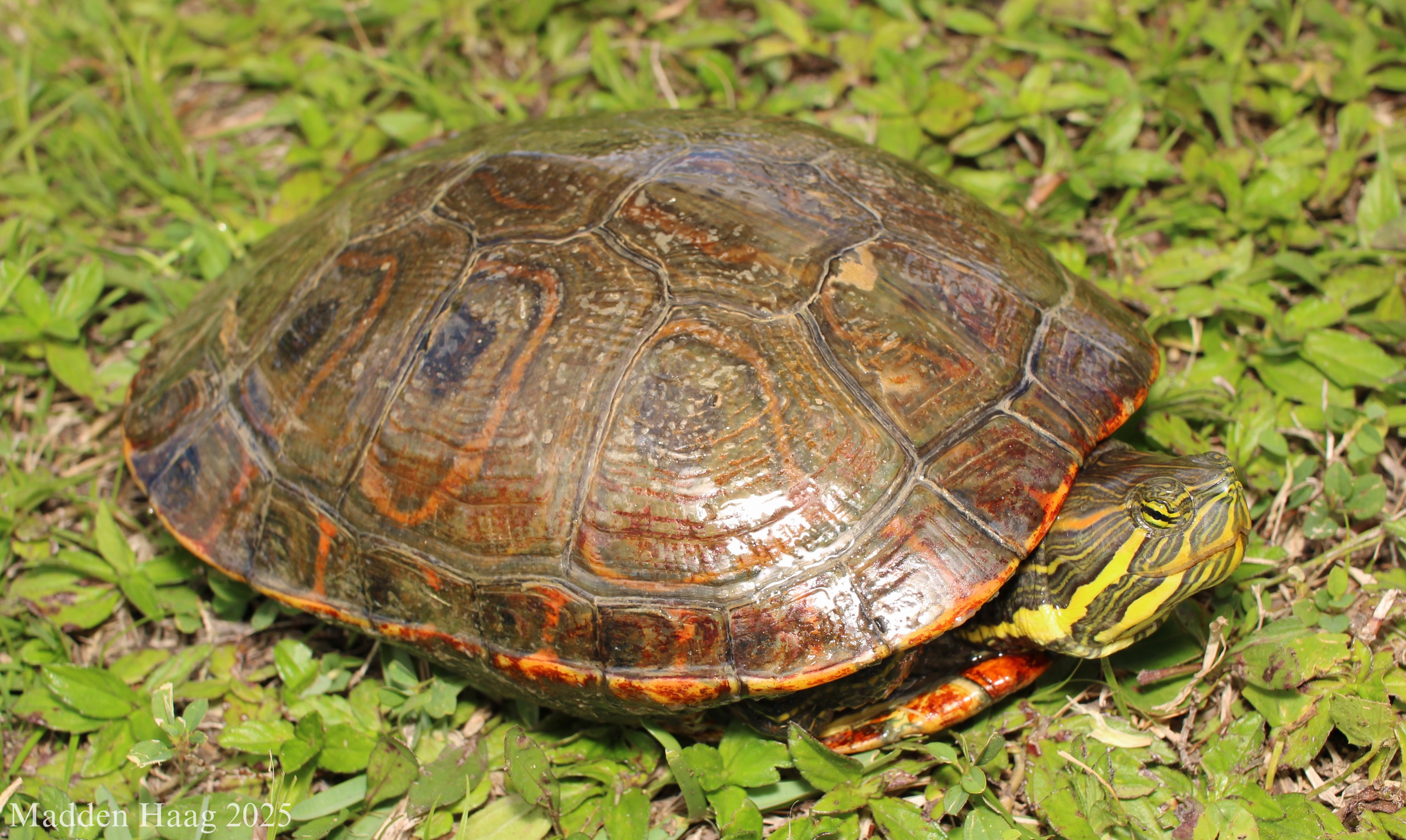
- Meso-American slider (Trachemys venusta)

Conservation status
- Not evaluated (IUCN 2.3)

Scientific classification
- Kingdom: Animalia
- Phylum: Chordata
- Class: Reptilia
- Order: Testudines
- Suborder: Cryptodira
- Family: Emydidae
- Genus: Trachemys
- Species: T. venusta

Binomial name
- Trachemys venusta (Gray, 1856)

Synonyms
- Trachemys venusta venusta: Emys venusta Gray, 1856; Emys valida LeConte, 1860; Clemmys valida — Strauch, 1862; Callichelys venusta — Gray, 1863; Emys (Clemmys) salvini Günther, 1885; Pseudemys salvini — Cope, 1887; Emys valida — Malnate, 1971; Pseudemys scripta venusta — Moll & Legler, 1971; Chrysemys scripta venusta — Henderson & Hoevers, 1975; Trachemys scripta venusta — Iverson, 1985; Trachemys ornata venusta — Walls, 1996; Trachemys venusta venusta — Seidel, 2002; Trachemys venusta cataspila: Emys ventricosa Gray, 1856; Pseudemys ventricosa — Gray, 1870; Emys (Clemmys) cataspila Günther, 1885; Pseudemys cataspila — Cope, 1887; Chrysemys ornata var. cataspila — Boulenger, 1889; Pseudemys scripta cataspila — Carr, 1938; Pseudemys ornata cataspila — Mertens & Wermuth, 1955; Chrysemys scripta cataspila — H.M. Smith & R.B. Smith, 1975; Trachemys scripta cataspila — Iverson, 1985; Trachemys ornata cataspila — Fritz, 1995; Trachemys venusta cataspila — Seidel, 2002; Trachemys venusta grayi: Emys grayi Bocourt, 1868; Callichelys grayii — Gray, 1870 (ex errore); Emys umbra Bocourt, 1876; Pseudemys umbra — Cope, 1887; Callichelys grayi — Boulenger, 1889; Chrysemys grayi — Boulenger, 1889; Clemmys umbra — Strauch, 1890; Chrysemys umbra — Lindholm, 1929; Pseudemys grayi — Carr, 1938; Pseudemys ornata grayi — Stuart, 1963; Pseudemys scripta grayi — Legler & Webb, 1970; Chrysemys scripta grayi — H.M. Smith & R.B. Smith, 1975; Pseudemys scripta umbra — Pritchard, 1979; Trachemys scripta grayi — Iverson, 1985; Trachemys grayi — King & Burke, 1989; Trachemys ornata grayi — Walls, 1996; Trachemys venusta grayi — Seidel, 2002

= Meso-American slider =

Species of turtle

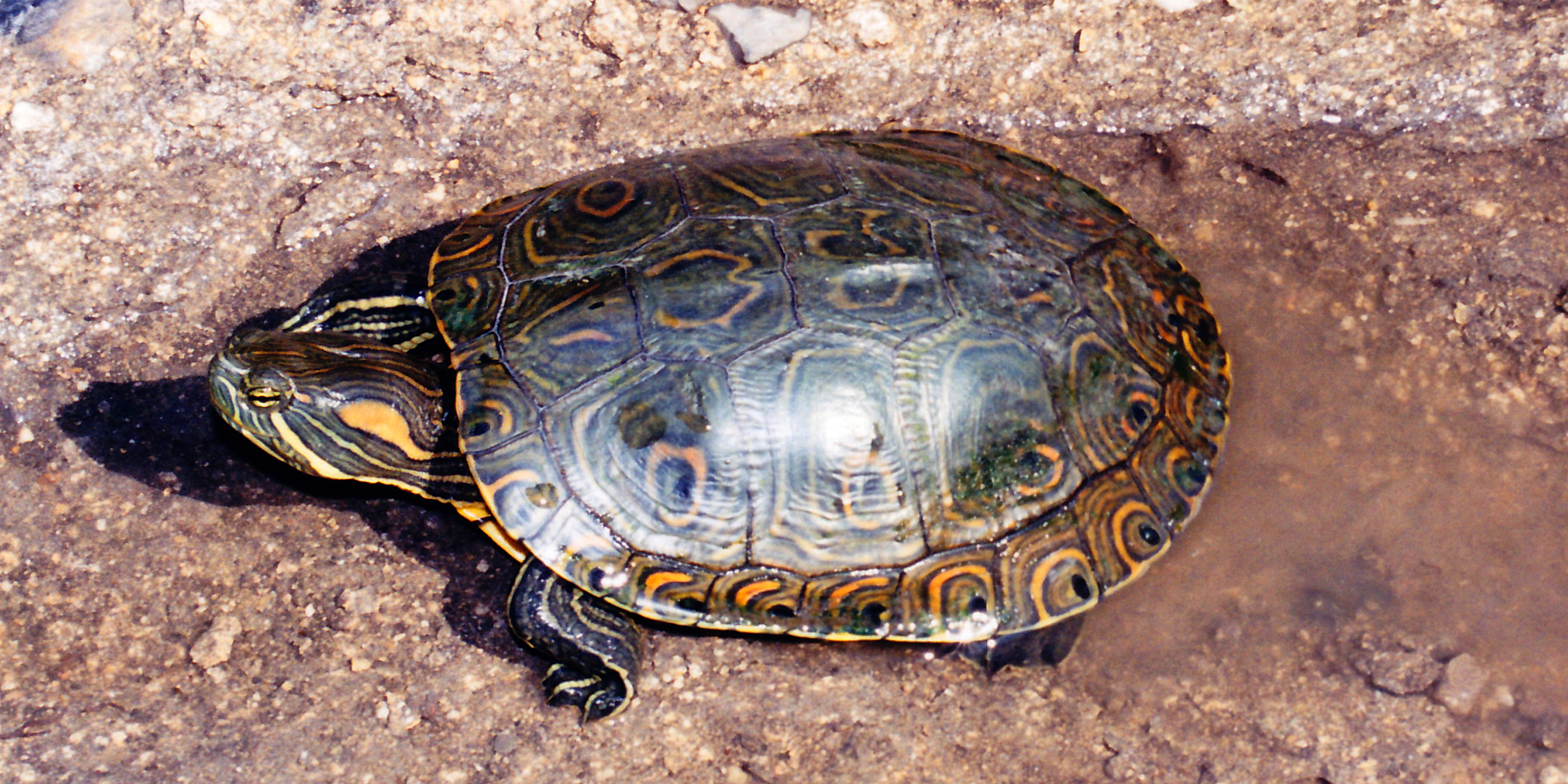
Mesoamerican Slider (Trachemys venusta cataspila), Municipality of Ocampo, Tamaulipas, Mexico (22 September 2004).

The Meso-American slider (Trachemys venusta) is a species of turtle belonging to the family Emydidae. The species is distributed from Mexico to Colombia.

== Geographic range ==
Trachemys venusta is found from southeastern Mexico to northwestern Colombia.

- Trachemys venusta venusta – Belize, Guatemala, Honduras, and Mexico in the states of Campeche, Chiapas, Oaxaca, Quintana Roo, Tabasco, Veracruz, and Yucatán
- Trachemys venusta cataspila – Mexico in the states of San Luis Potosí, Tamaulipas, and Veracruz
- Trachemys venusta grayi – El Salvador, Guatemala and Mexico in the states of Chiapas and Oaxaca

The following three new subspecies were described in 2010.

- Trachemys venusta iversoni – Mexico in the state of Yucatán
- Trachemys venusta panamensis – Panama
- Trachemys venusta uhrigi – Costa Rica, Honduras, Nicaragua, Panama, and Colombia in the departments of Antioquia and Chocó

== Subspecies ==
- Trachemys venusta venusta (Gray, 1856) – Belize slider
- Trachemys venusta cataspila (Günther, 1885) – Huastecan slider
- Trachemys venusta grayi (Bocourt, 1868) – Gray's slider
- Trachemys venusta iversoni McCord, Joseph-Ouni, Hagen & Blanck, 2010 – Yucatán slider
- Trachemys venusta panamensis McCord, Joseph-Ouni, Hagen & Blanck, 2010 – Panamanian slider
- Trachemys venusta uhrigi McCord, Joseph-Ouni, Hagen & Blanck, 2010 – Uhrig's slider

== Etymology ==
The subspecific name, grayi, is in honor of British herpetologist John Edward Gray.

== Bibliography ==
- Rhodin, Anders G.J.; van Dijk, Peter Paul; Iverson, John B.; Shaffer, H. Bradley (2010-12-14). "Turtles of the World 2010 Update: Annotated Checklist of Taxonomy, Synonymy, Distribution and Conservation Status" (PDF). Archived from the original (PDF) on 2011-07-17.
- Fritz, Uwe; Havaš, Peter (2007-10-31). "Checklist of Chelonians of the World" (PDF). Archived from the original (PDF) on 2011-05-01.
