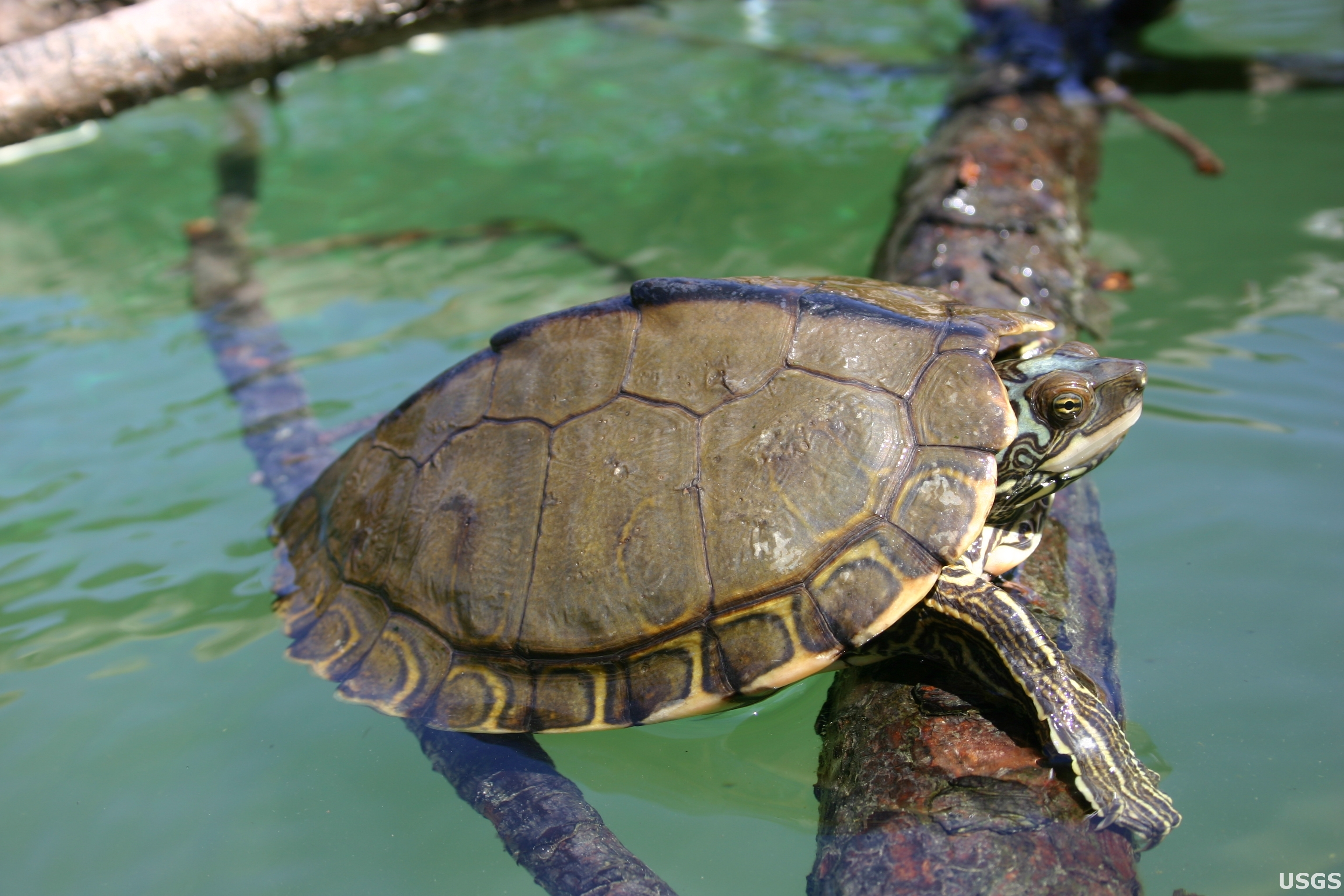

Conservation status
- Endangered (IUCN 3.1)
- CITES Appendix II (CITES)

Scientific classification
- Kingdom: Animalia
- Phylum: Chordata
- Class: Reptilia
- Order: Testudines
- Suborder: Cryptodira
- Family: Emydidae
- Genus: Graptemys
- Species: G. pearlensis

Binomial name
- Graptemys pearlensis Ennen et al., 2010
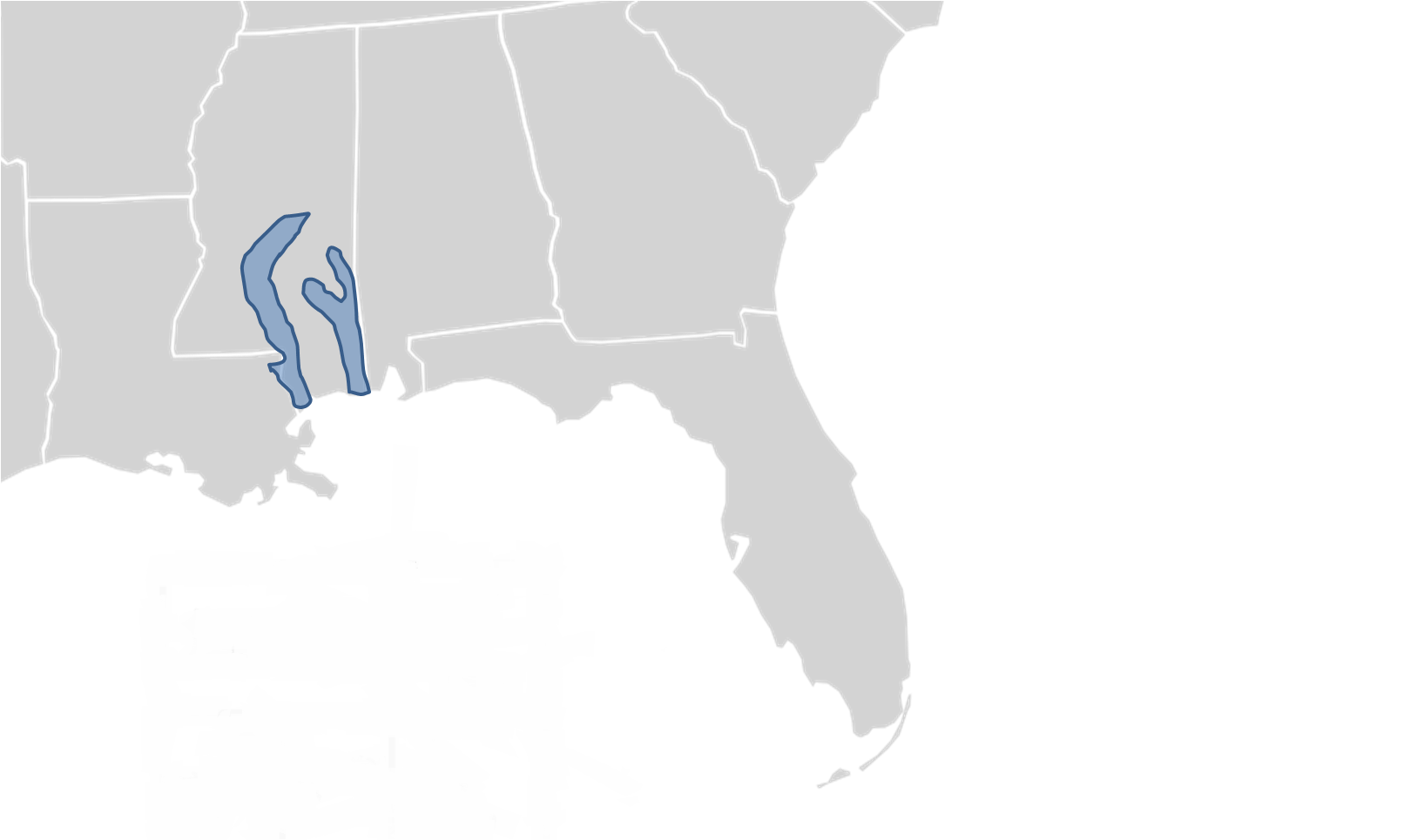
- Combined range map of Pearl River map turtle (western blue section) and Pascagoula map turtle (eastern blue section)

= Pearl River map turtle =

Species of turtle

The Pearl River map turtle (Graptemys pearlensis) is a species of emydid turtle native to the southern United States. According to a study done in January 2017, the species G. pearlensis was significantly less abundant in the Pearl River region as compared to G. oculifera and exhibited a smaller number of reproductively mature females. Further, this study highlighted statistical and observational evidence that this species exhibited female-biased, sexual dimorphism.

== Geographic range ==
It is endemic to the Pearl River in Louisiana and Mississippi. The ringed map turtle (G. oculifera) is also endemic to the Pearl River.

== Taxonomy ==
Until 2010, it was included in the Pascagoula map turtle (G. gibbonsi), which it resembles. In 2010 Ennen and his colleagues described Graptemys pearlensis as a new species. They used sequence variation of the mitochondrial control region along with the ND4 gene and found out three samples of Graptemys pearlensis constituting reciprocally monophyletic sister clades.

== Conservation ==
In 2024, the Pearl River map turtle was listed as a threatened species under the Endangered Species Act of 1973. Basking survey data suggest that fewer than 22,000 individuals existed in the wild in 2020, with low or moderate resiliency estimates in all portions of the turtle's range. The U.S. Fish and Wildlife Service (USFWS) assessed that the Pearl River map turtle is threatened by habitat loss and degradation, take for collection and climate change. The construction of the Ross Barnett Reservoir between 1960 and 1963 rendered a portion of the Pearl River unsuitable for occupancy by the lotic species. On the basis of similarity of appearance to Graptemys pearlensis, the USFWS also listed the macrocephalic Graptemys species G. pulchra, G. barbouri, G. ernsti and G. gibbonsi as threatened.
