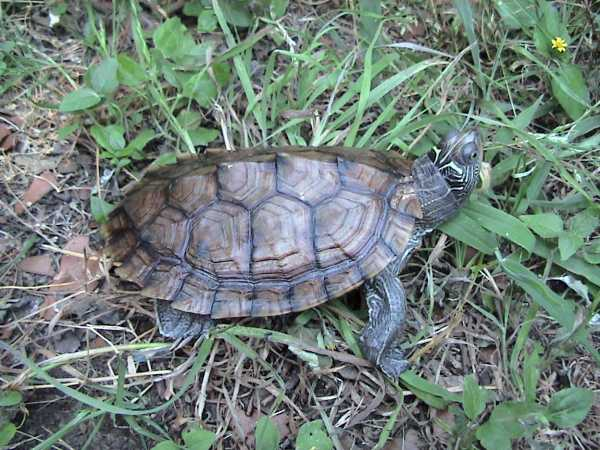
- Graptemys pseudogeographica, false map turtle

Scientific classification
- Kingdom: Animalia
- Phylum: Chordata
- Class: Reptilia
- Order: Testudines
- Suborder: Cryptodira
- Family: Emydidae
- Subfamily: Deirochelyinae
- Genus: Graptemys; Agassiz, 1857

Species
- 14, see text

Synonyms
- Graptemys Agassiz, 1857; Malacoclemmys Cope, 1875 (in part); Malaclemys McDowell, 1964

= Graptemys =

Genus of turtles

Graptemys is a genus of freshwater turtles containing 14 species, commonly known as map turtles. Graptemys are small to medium-sized turtles that are significantly sexually dimorphic, with females in some species attaining as much as twice the length and ten times the mass as males. Depending on the species, adult males range from 7–16 cm (2.75–6.25 in), adult females 10–29.5 cm (4–11.62 in), and hatchlings 2.5–3.8 cm (1–1.5 in), although some sources indicate female Barbour's map turtles (Graptemys barbouri) grow to 33 cm (13 in) in length. Most species have a distinctive dark pigmented keel that is often notched or serrated running down the center of the carapace and serrated scutes on the rear margin. The head, neck, and limbs exhibit bold patterns of yellow (occasionally orange or red) lines and spots against darker green, olive, or black base colors. The patterns on the head can be important characters in identifying the various species. The common name "map turtle" is derived from the intricate patterns on their shells that are suggestive of topographical maps, although the patterns are more apparent in some species than others, and often become obscure in older specimens. Some species are occasionally called "sawbacks", in reference to the serrated keels on their shell.

They are endemic to North America, where most species occur in the rivers of the Gulf Coast of the United States, although three species are more wide-ranging, dispersed throughout the eastern two thirds of the greater Mississippi River basin, into the Great Lakes region, and east to New York and southeast Canada. Most Graptemys are lotic (river) turtles, having a preference for moving water and larger lakes, and with long legs, broad feet, and long fully webbed digits they are well adapted for swimming in currents. They primarily feed on fresh water mussels, clams, snails, insects (including larva and eggs), bryozoans, sponges, algae, and various vegetation. Fish only appear in the diets of a few species and then only in a relatively small percentage of the diet. Within this spectrum of food items there is significant niche partitioning among the sexually dimorphic males and females, and microcephalic, mesocephalic, and megacephalic species occurring in the same river drainages. Like all turtles, map turtles are oviparous, typically laying eggs from late June to August. Females lay two to fifteen eggs per clutch and, depending on a number of variables such as species, size, and age, among other factors, may skip a year between clutches, or lay as many four clutches a year.

Seven of the 14 species are listed as either near threatened, vulnerable, or endangered by the IUCN Red List as of 2021, and two species, the yellow-blotched map turtle (G. flavimaculata) and the ringed map turtle (G. oculifera) are listed as threatened by the U.S. Federal Government.

== Species ==
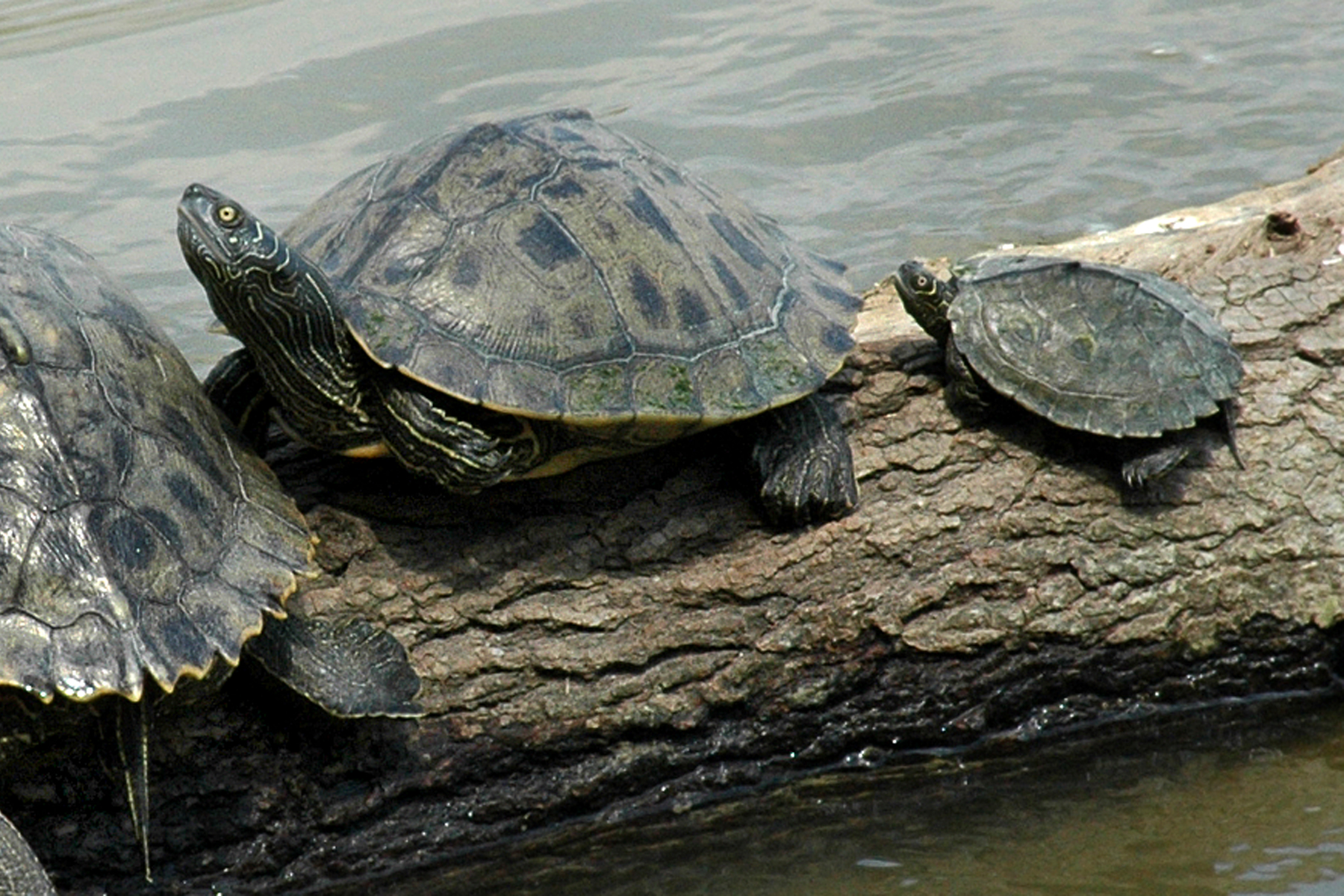
Mississippi map turtles (Graptemys pseudogeographica kohni), adult female left, adult male right, photographed in situ, Trinity River, Liberty Co., Texas (20 April 2007)

The following species and subspecies are recognized as being valid (listed alphabetically by specific name and subspecific name). Nota bene: A binomial authority or trinomial authority in parentheses indicates that the species or subspecies was originally described in a genus other than Graptemys.

=== Extant species ===
- Graptemys barbouri Carr & Marchand, 1942 – Barbour's map turtle
- Graptemys caglei Haynes & McKown, 1974 – Cagle's map turtle
- Graptemys ernsti Lovich & McCoy, 1992 – Escambia map turtle
- Graptemys flavimaculata Cagle, 1954 – yellow-blotched map turtle or yellow-blotched sawback
- Graptemys geographica (Lesueur, 1817) – northern map turtle, formerly known as the common map turtle
- Graptemys gibbonsi Lovich & McCoy, 1992 – Pascagoula map turtle
- Graptemys nigrinoda Cagle, 1954 – black-knobbed map turtle
- Graptemys oculifera (Baur, 1890) – ringed map turtle
- Graptemys ouachitensis Cagle, 1953 – Ouachita map turtle
- Graptemys pearlensis Ennen, Lovich, Kreiser, Selman, Qualls, 2010 – Pearl River map turtle
- Graptemys pseudogeographica (Gray, 1831) – false map turtle
  - G. p. kohnii (Baur, 1890) – Mississippi map turtle
  - G. p. pseudogeographica (Gray, 1831) – false map turtle
- Graptemys pulchra Baur, 1893 – Alabama map turtle
- Graptemys sabinensis Cagle, 1953 – Sabine map turtle
- Graptemys versa Stejneger, 1925 – Texas map turtle

=== Fossil species ===
An extinct species from the Suwannee River drainage in Florida, Graptemys kerneri belonging to the female megacephalic subclade, was described in 2011 from Pleistocene fossil records.

- †Graptemys kerneri Ehret & Bourque, 2011

== Etymology ==
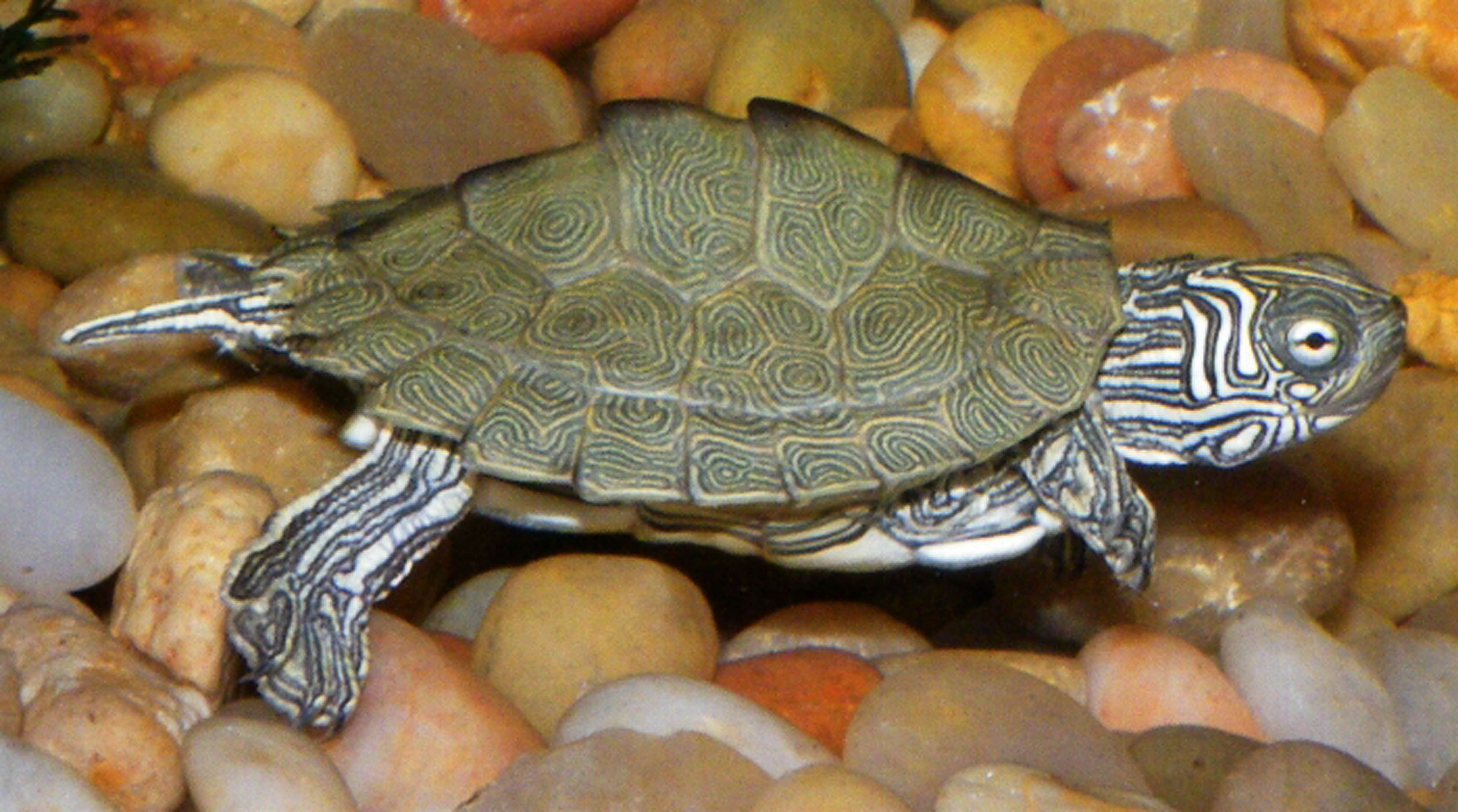
Cagle's map turtle (Graptemys caglei) hatchling

The generic name Graptemys is derived from two compounded Greek words, graptos, meaning inscribed or in writing, in reference to the patterns on the turtles shells, and emydos, meaning a freshwater turtle. The trivial names, or specific epithets, of four of the species in the genus are patronyms or eponyms, named in honor of prominent herpetologist, each of whom made significant contributions to studies on North American turtles: Thomas Barbour (G. barbouri); Fred Ray Cagle (G. caglei); Carl Henry Ernst (G. ernsti); J. Whitfield Gibbons (G. gibbonsi). One subspecies is named for the collector of the type specimen, Joseph Gustave Kohn (G. pseudogeographica kohnii). Three species are named for the rivers in which they were first discovered: Ouachita River (G. ouachitensis); Sabine River (G. sabinensis); Pearl River (G. pearlensis). The other species are all named for various aspects of the topographic map like patterns and other markings, colors, and contours of the carapace, that are most apparent in the juveniles and young adults of these attractive turtles: G. flavimaculata, flavus = yellow, maculatus = spotted or blotched; G. geographica, geographica = geographic map like; G. nigrinoda, niger = black, nodus = knot, node, or knob; G. oculifera, oculus = eye, fero = to bear (eye shape rings on the pleurals scutes); G. pseudogeographica, pseudo = false, geographica = geographic map like; G. pulchra, pulchra = beautiful; G. versa, vers = to change (probably referring to the contrasting head patterns compared to G. pseudogeographica).

== Description ==
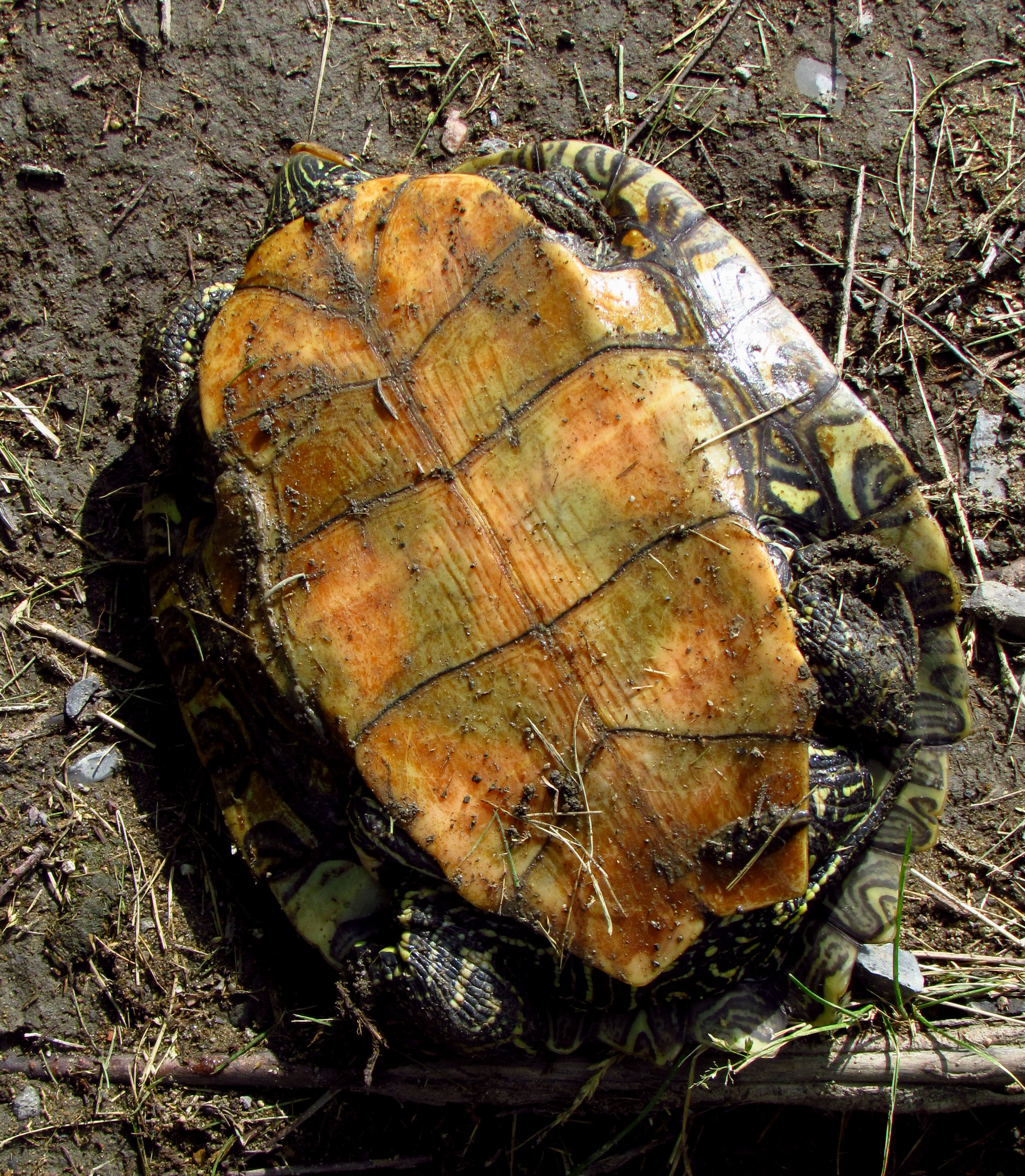
Northern Map Turtle (Graptemys geographica), plastron, Lac Leamy, Gatineau, Quebec, Canada (12 June 2011)

Graptemys species superficially resemble many other species of aquatic turtles, including sliders (Trachemys) and cooters (Pseudemys). However, they are distinguished by a keel that runs the length of the center of the carapace. In some southern species, the keel can result in vertebral spines, resulting in the map turtle's other common name — "sawback". They also typically grow to a smaller size at maturity. They are given the common name "map turtle" due to the map-like markings on the carapace. Map turtles are known for intricate head markings and strong sexual dimorphism with mature females twice the length and 10 times the mass of mature males.

=== Feeding morphology ===
Females of all map turtle species can be partitioned into three groups based on head (alveolar) width and corresponding ecology and phylogeny.

1. Microcephalic females are narrow headed, sympatric with a broader headed species, and consume few mollusks. Microcephalic species include yellow-blotched, black-knobbed, ringed, Ouachita, and Sabine map turtles.
2. Mesocephalic females have moderately broad heads and tend to eat mostly mollusks along with softer bodied prey. Mesocephalic species include Cagle's, northern, false, Mississippi, and Texas map turtles.
3. Megacephalic females have exceptionally broad heads, and feed almost exclusively on mollusks. Megacephalic females include Barbour's, Escambia, Pascagoula, Pearl River, and Alabama map turtles.

Males do not fit neatly into the three groups describing head width, with differences in head width likely not influencing diet. Due to these differences in head size and jaw strength, females tend to eat much larger prey than the males such as snails, clams, and crayfish whereas the males eat insects and smaller crustaceans. Including deadwood material inside of the Graptemys habitat then the chances of more Graptemys migrating or being born in that area is greater. The population can use a healthy habitat that can support a significant number of Graptemys and dead wood will help with this.

== Distribution ==
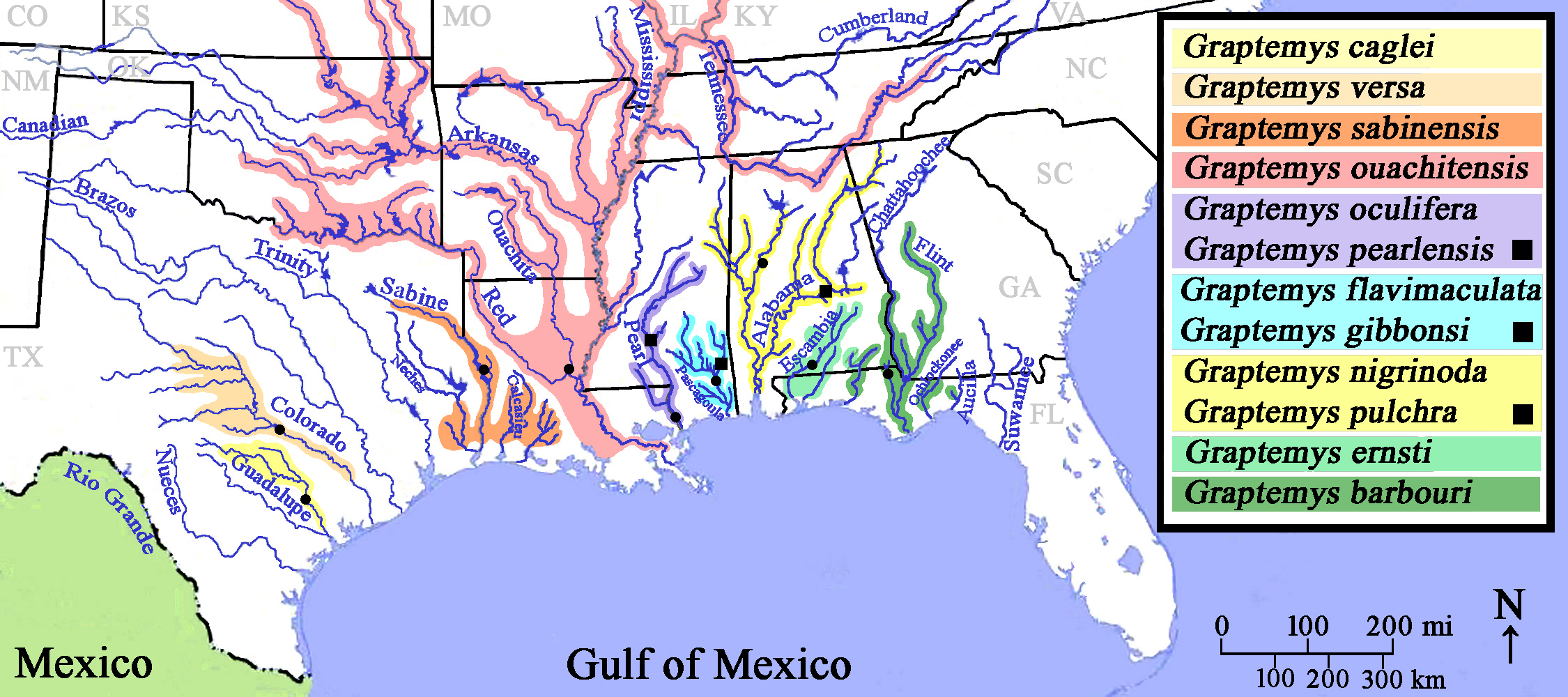
The distribution of 11 Graptemys species and partial distribution of G. ouachitensis. The black dots and squares represent type localities.

Distribution of Graptemys geographica

Map turtles are endemic to North America. The genus ranges from the Great Lakes region and St. Lawrence River of southern Quebec and Ontario, Canada, south to the Gulf of Mexico, and the Hudson River and Delaware River basins on the Atlantic coast, west to the eastern margins of the Great Plains. Most species occur in rivers, moving waters, or larger lakes. Eleven of the 14 species have relatively limited distributions, restricted to river basins draining into the Gulf of Mexico, in the US states of Texas, Louisiana, Mississippi, Alabama, southwest Georgia, and the Florida panhandle. Three species are more wide ranging, include the Ouachita Map Turtle (G. ouachitensis) and the False Map Turtle (G. pseudogeographica) which range extensively in the Mississippi River drainage and its tributaries including much of the mid west, with the latter also ranging west into east Texas. The Northern Map Turtle (G. geographica) is the most widespread species, occurring in both Atlantic and Gulf of Mexico river drainages, from southern Quebec, Canada, west to Minnesota and eastern Kansas, south to New Jersey and above (north) of the fall line in Georgia, Alabama, and extreme northern Louisiana.

== Ecology and natural history ==
=== Habitat ===
Map turtles are predominantly lotic, living in moving water, such as rivers and larger creeks, streams, and bayous. The northern and wide-ranging Mississippi River species (G. geographica, G. pseudogeographica, G. ouachitensis) tend to inhabit more diverse habitats, including sloughs, oxbow lakes, and backwater areas of river bottoms, as well as lakes and occasionally even ponds and marshlands. Other species use these environments much less frequently, or as juveniles or during seasonal flooding, and a few species have never been reported from areas beyond the main channels of their respective river systems (e.g. G. gibbonsi, G. pearlensis, G. sabinensis). Several species will inhabit manmade reservoirs in their river systems, while other species are very uncommon in such impoundments (e.g. G. oculifera, G. versa), and still others are entirely absent from reservoirs (e. g. G. caglei). With few exceptions (G. barbouri, G. flavimaculata, G. nigrinoda), most species do not occur in tidally influenced waterways, estuaries, or brackish waters, which are occupied by their closest relative the diamondback terrapin (Malaclemys terrapin). The upstream distributional limits of many species are often associated with the level of sunlight penetration through the forest canopy. Larger, wider waterways allow sunlight to reach the surface, providing for the growth of aquatic vegetation and algae (food) and basking sites for Graptemys populations. Smaller streams in the shadow of forest canopies, or that receive brief patchy sunlight, are rarely inhabited by Graptemys.

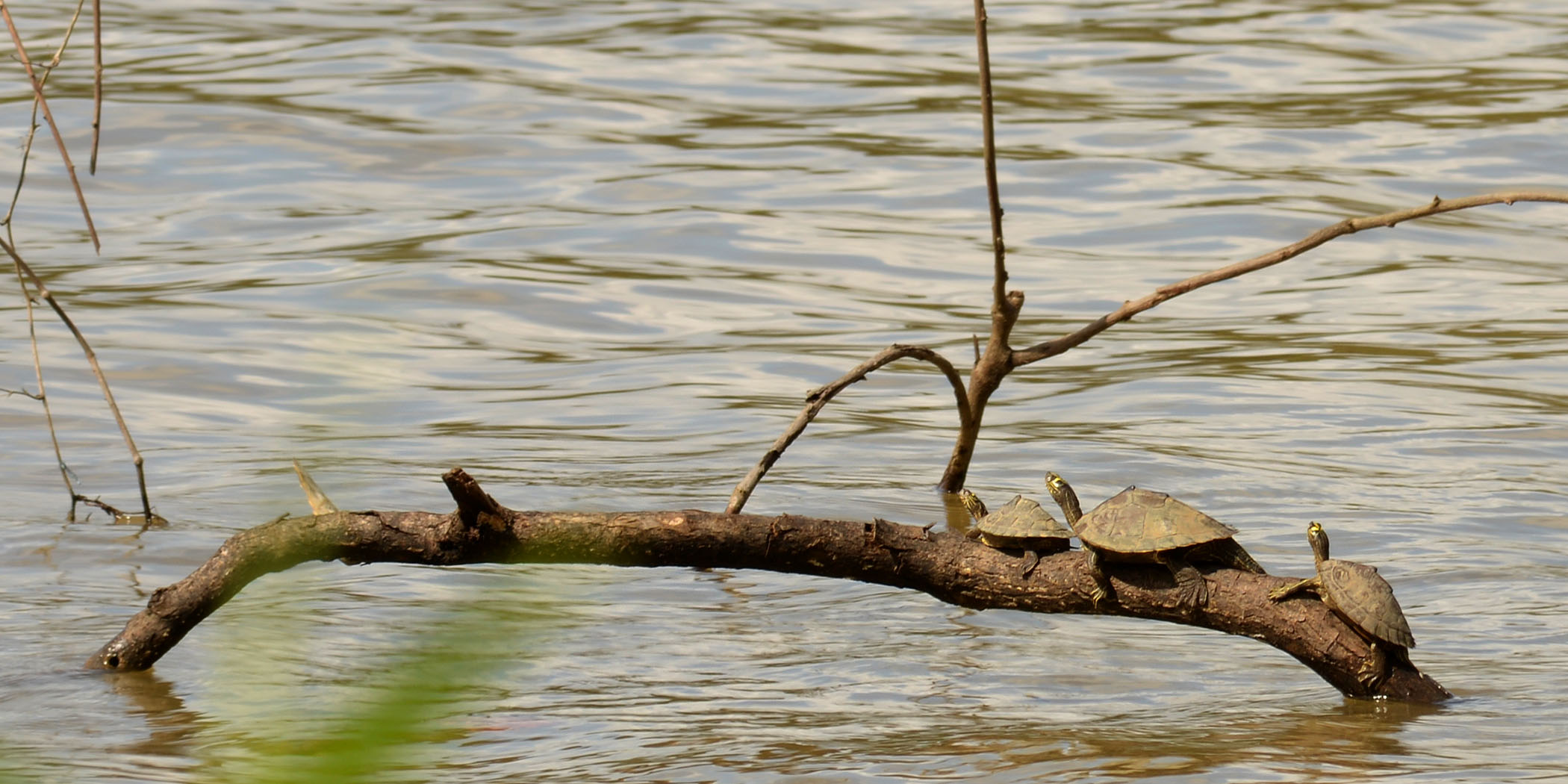
Map turtles (Graptemys) typically select basking sites emerging from the water without any contact to land, Sabine map turtles (G. sabinensis), Orange Co. Texas (15 October 2016)

The ecology of many species of map turtles, particularly habitat use and diet, have been well studied. Specific habitat use often differs among males and females of the same species, as well as sympatric species sharing a river system, all inextricably linked to their diets in a somewhat complex example of niche differentiation. Ten of the 14 Graptemys species share a river basin with another Graptemys species, and three species occur in regions of Alabama, and portions of the Mississippi River. Generally the mesocephalic and megacephalic females occupy deeper areas with stronger currents and hard-bottom, limestone sections of rivers, and males inhabit slower, shallower areas of the rivers nearer to the shore, largely correlated with their respective diets and prey distribution. Graptemys rarely walk on land or move between waterways. Most species are reluctant to bask on river banks and are seldom seen even on fallen trees with one end resting on the bank. Basking sites are most often fallen tree and deadwood emerging from water with no direct contact to the banks. Although the wide-ranging, northern species (G. geographica, G. pseudogeographica, G. ouachitensis) tend to be more flexible in their basking habits.

The natural meandering of rivers, riparian forest, and fallen trees and deadwood in the water are all key and vital elements to sustain most map turtle populations, particularly the Gulf Coast species. The outer bend in a river is typically the deeper side, with the stronger current of the main channel, eroding and cutting into the outer bank and falling trees of the riparian zone forest as it does. While the inside of the bend is shallower, with a slower current, dropping silt deposits and building beaches and sandbars. The meandering course maintains a diverse spectrum of water depths, temperatures, currents, soft and hardpan bottoms, as well as fallen trees and logs that get lodged in the bends. Beaches and sand bars are essential nesting sites. The presence of partially submerged deadwood and trees are critical, not only for basking, but for the growth of algae, bryozoans, sponges, snails, insects and their eggs larva that live in the growth, which are important food items for turtles.

=== Courtship behavior ===
Adult Graptemys males have greatly elongated claws on the front feet, which are used in courtship behavior. The male faces the considerably larger female and "fans" her face, vibrating his foreclaws against her head to induce her to cooperate in mating.

=== Longevity ===
Complete and accurate longevity records for map turtles are lacking. A review of zoo records published in 1992 identified the maximum period of time that many species of Graptemys lived in captivity in North American zoos, ranging from eight to 35 years, including: Barbour's map turtle (G. barbouri) 31 years 8 months; false map turtle (G. pseudogeographica ssp.) 32 years and 6 months; Mississippi map turtle (G. pseudogeographica kohnii) 35 years 5 months. However, these records involve turtles that were acquired by the zoos as adults from the wild, or of unknown origins and of undetermined ages. Therefore the records only reflect the period of time that an individual turtle was maintained at the institutions before it died, not the full lifespan of the individual. Subsequently, the longevity of two female Barbour's Map Turtles (G. barbouri) of unknown ages and origin at the Columbus Zoo were reported at 37 and 43 years. Herpetologist Carl Ernst noted northern map turtles (G. geographica) and Alabama map turtles (G. pulchra) likely live well over 20 years in the wild, and ringed map turtles (G. oculifera) are known to live at least 30 years in the wild. Based on records of other turtles in the Emydidae family, it is likely Graptemys longevity exceeds these records significantly, perhaps by decades.

== Conservation ==
The most frequently cited and best-documented threats to map turtle and sawback populations involve modifications of the rivers and lakes they inhabit and their take for the pet trade.

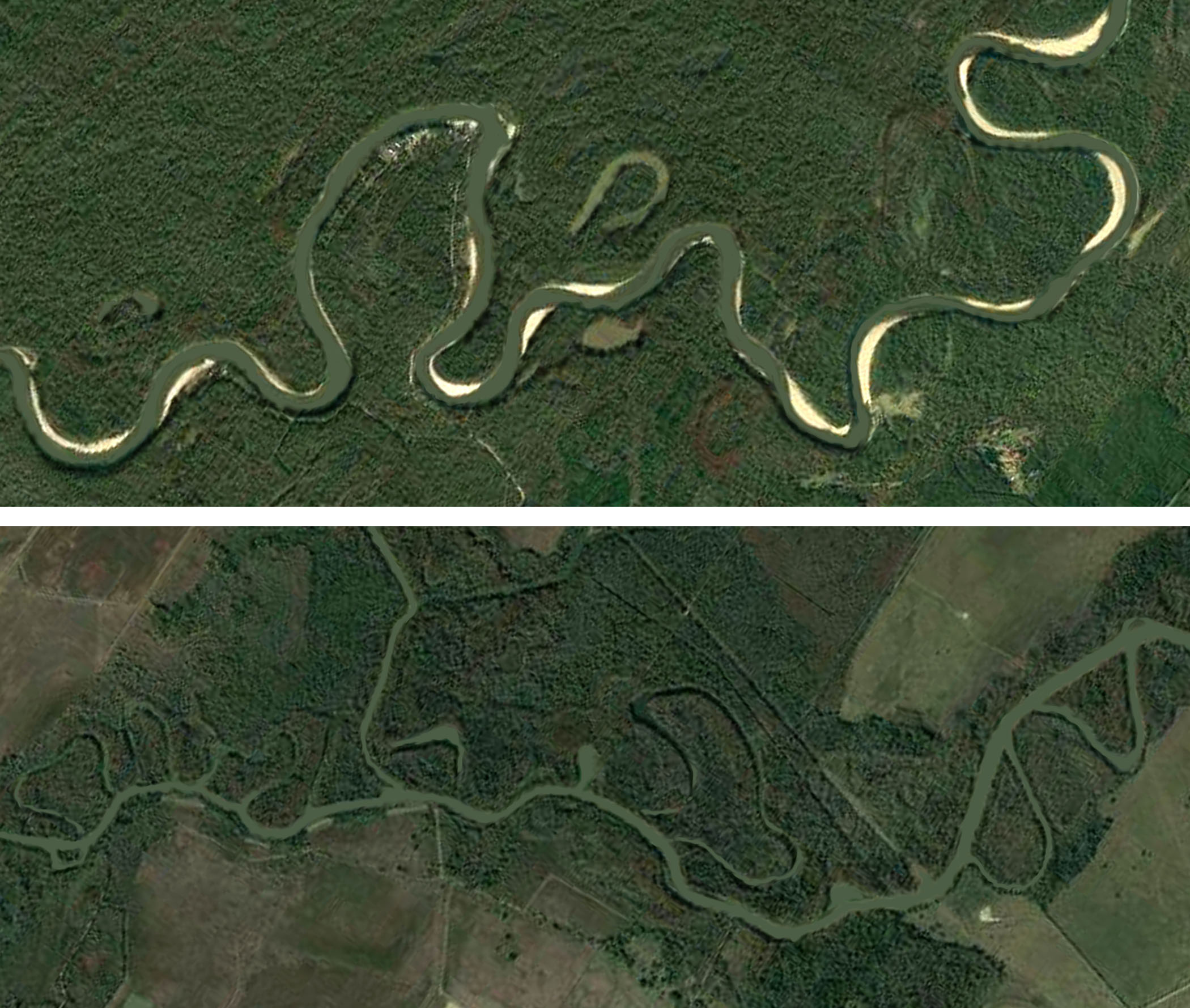
Top: A satellite view of the Sabine River showing the natural meandering course, producing a diverse spectrum of water depths, fast and slow currents, temperatures, soft and hardpan bottoms, sand beaches, and other habitats and microhabitats, all supporting a diverse spectrum of flora and fauna. Bottom: A channelized tributary of the Sabine River, maintained at a uniform depth, eliminating a spectrum of the habitats (e.g. beaches), and reducing or eliminating a spectrum of native flora and fauna.

Mississippi map turtle in a pet store.

The limited ranges and restricted habitats of most species make Graptemys particularly vulnerable to conservation issues. The destruction and fragmentation of habitat through the engineering of rivers and lakes, such as channelization, dams and impoundments, gravel and sand mining, pollution, clearing and development of riparian zones, and the removal of logs and deadwood from waterways are among the foremost conservation threats to map turtles. These activities degrade or destroy nesting sites (sandbars), prey species and prey habitat, and basking sites that are essential for thermoregulation and the turtles survival. The pet trade is another significant threat to the survival of map turtles. In the year in 2000 alone, 200,000 live Graptemys were exported from the US, predominantly to Europe, and this does not take into account the domestic market.

A variety of human activities such as bycatch in gillnetting and fyke nets, injuries form boat propellers, and "plinking", the practice of shooing turtles for target practice, or for the misinformed idea that they are significant competitors for game fish, all contribute to mortalities. Seemingly benign activities such as the regular use of sandbar beaches for recreation, swimming, and heavy boat traffic are known to cause turtles to abandon stretches of rivers and nesting sites. Some lesser threats include invasive species such as fire ants (Solenopsis invicta) which are known to prey on eggs and hatchlings. Invasive plants such as water hyacinth (Eichhornia crassipes), alligator weed (Alternanthera philoxeroides), congon grass (Imperata cylindrica), cocklebur (Xanthium stramarium), and the Chinese tallow tree (Triadica sebifera) are all known to degrade Graptemys habitat and nesting beaches. Hydrilla (Hydrilla verticillata) has been associated with steep declines of black-knobbed map turtles in some areas. Conversely, maps turtles are known to feed on some non-native species of clams (Corbicula) and mussels (Dreissena).

The United States Federal Government list two species, the yellow-blotched map turtle (G. flavimaculata) and the ringed map turtle (G. oculifera) as threatened species. In Texas the state government list the Cagle's Map Turtle (G. caglei) as a threatened species. The state of Louisiana list the ringed map turtle (G. oculifera) as threatened and the Ouachita map turtle (G. ouachitensis) and Sabine Map Turtle (G. sabinensis) as vulnerable. The state of Mississippi list the yellow-blotched map turtle (G. flavimaculata) as threatened and the ringed map turtle (G. oculifera) and black-knobbed map turtle (G. nigrinoda) as endangered. In Alabama, all six species of map turtles occurring in the state are classified as nongame species protected by the state. In Georgia the Barbour's map turtle (G. barbouri) is as threatened and the northern map turtle (G. geographica) and Alabama map turtle (G. pulchra) are considered rare species ranked S1 and S3 respectively. In Florida Barbour's map turtle (G. barbouri) is state-designated as threatened. The Government of Canada list the Northern Map Turtle (G. geographica) is a species of special concern. Seven of the 14 Graptemys species are listed as either, near threatened, vulnerable, or endangered by the IUCN Red List as of 2021 As of 2021, all Graptemys are listed as Appendix III by CITES.

== Pet trade ==
Throughout the pet trade, the Mississippi map turtle, the northern map turtle, and Ouachita map turtle were bred and hatched out by the thousands in the 1970s. Various other turtles were available, but as the salmonellosis Four-inch Law was established, map turtles and others slowly decreased in popularity. Today, these same three still hold the title for most common among the pet trade. Other species being captive-bred more often include the Texas map turtle, Cagle's map turtle, and the black-knobbed map turtle. Some harder-to-find map turtles include the yellow-blotched map turtle and the Pearl River map turtle.

== Gallery ==
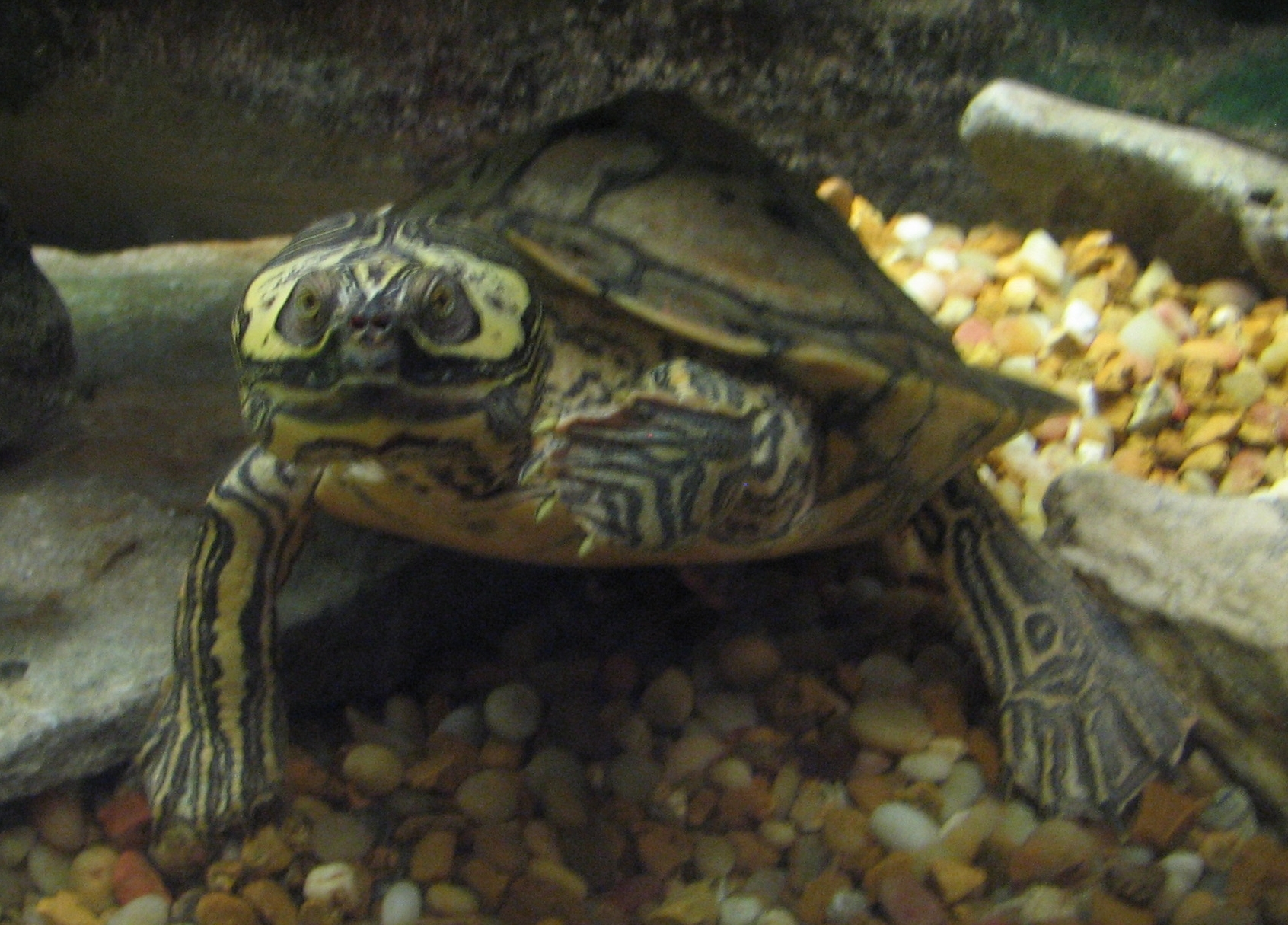
Barbour's map turtle (Graptemys barbouri), megacephalic female in zoo exhibit

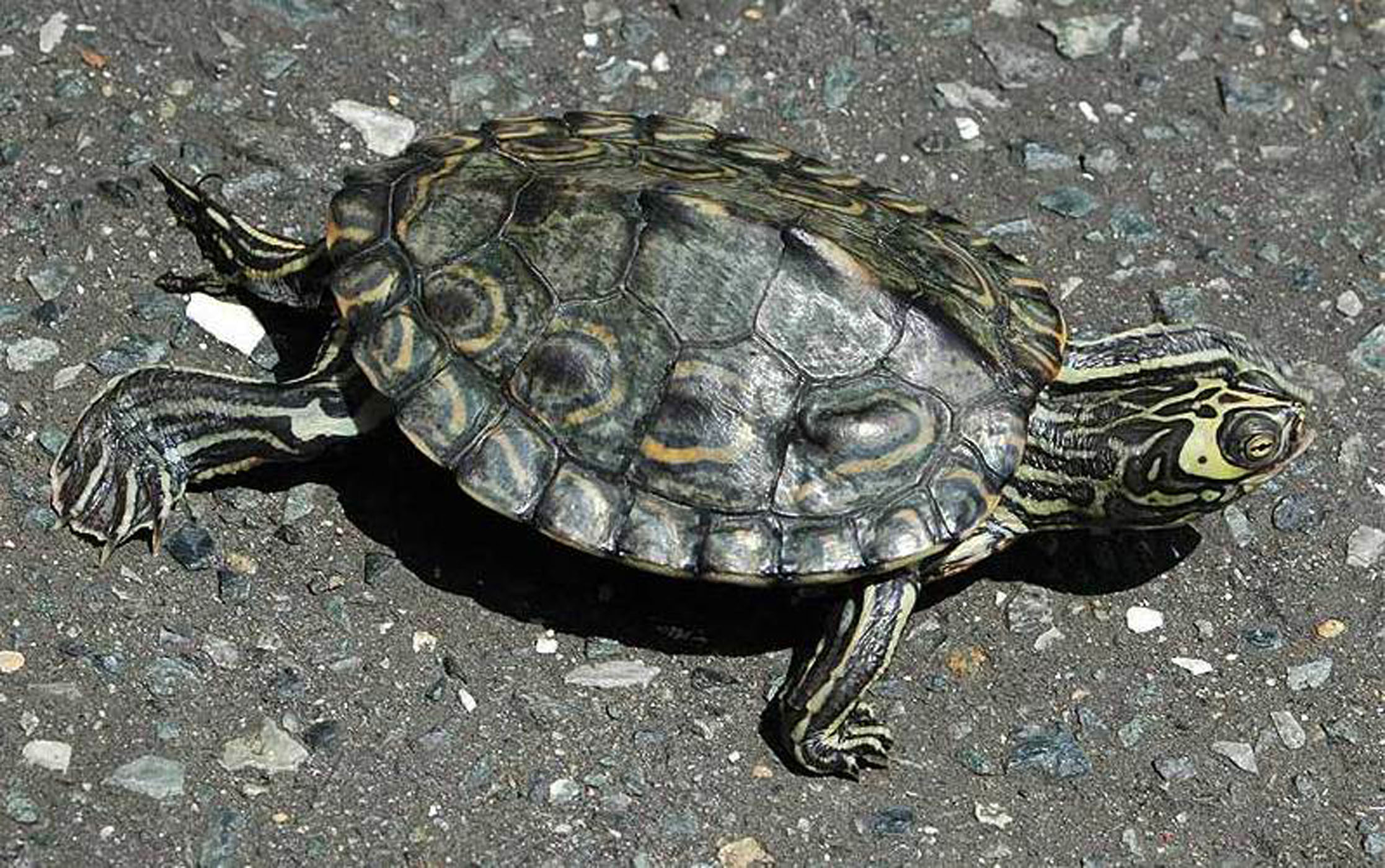
Barbour's map turtle (Graptemys barbouri), male

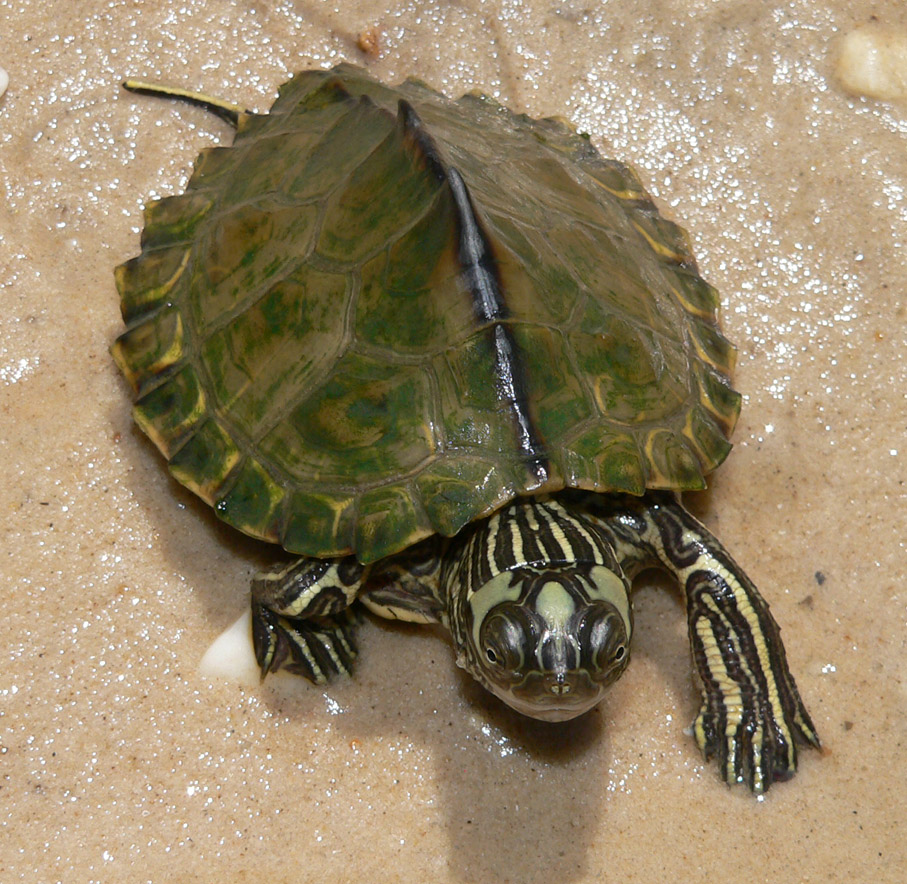
Escambia map turtle (Graptemys ernsti)

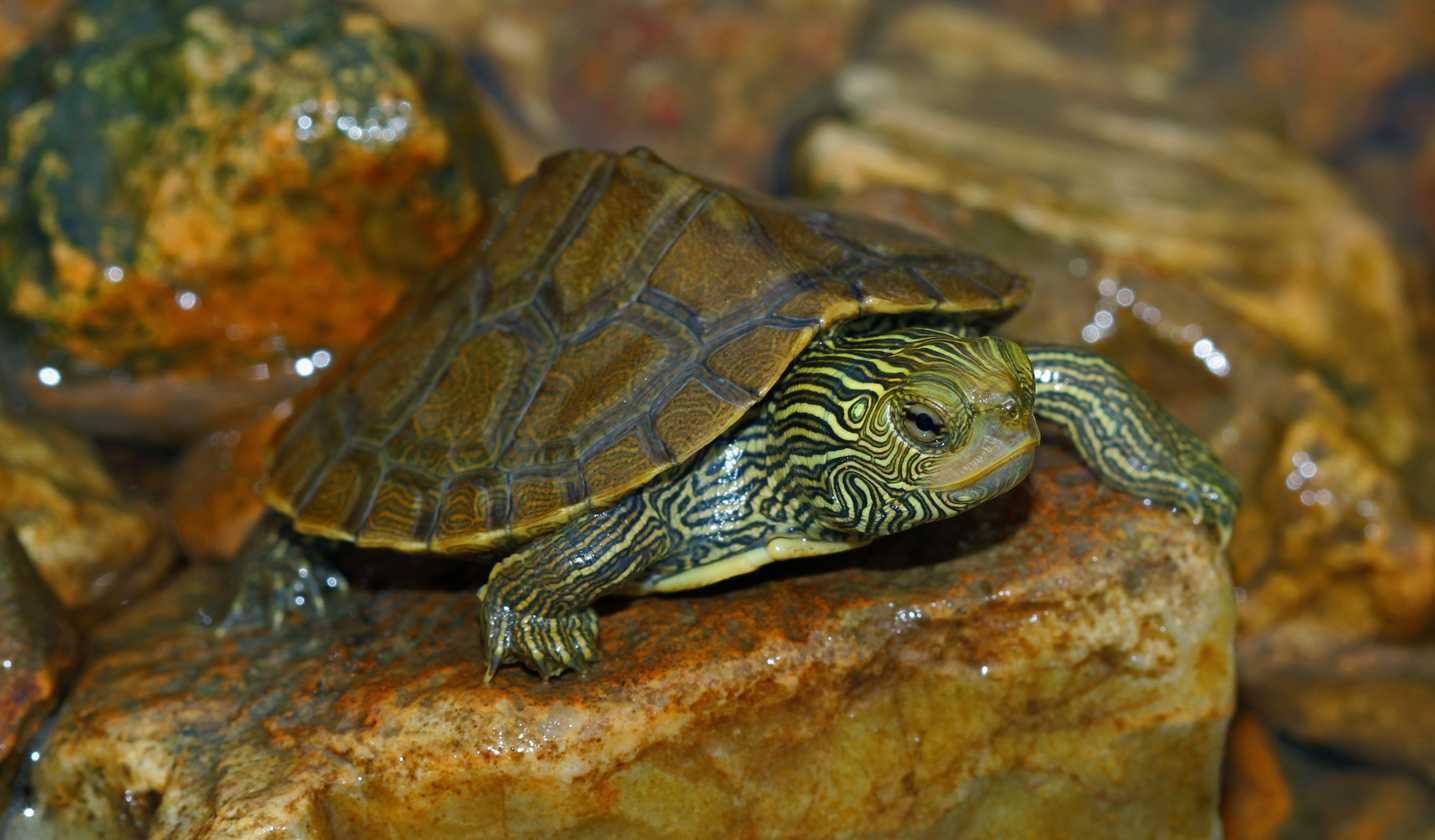
Northern map turtle (Graptemys geographica), juvenile, Meramec River, Franklin County, Missouri (August 2020)

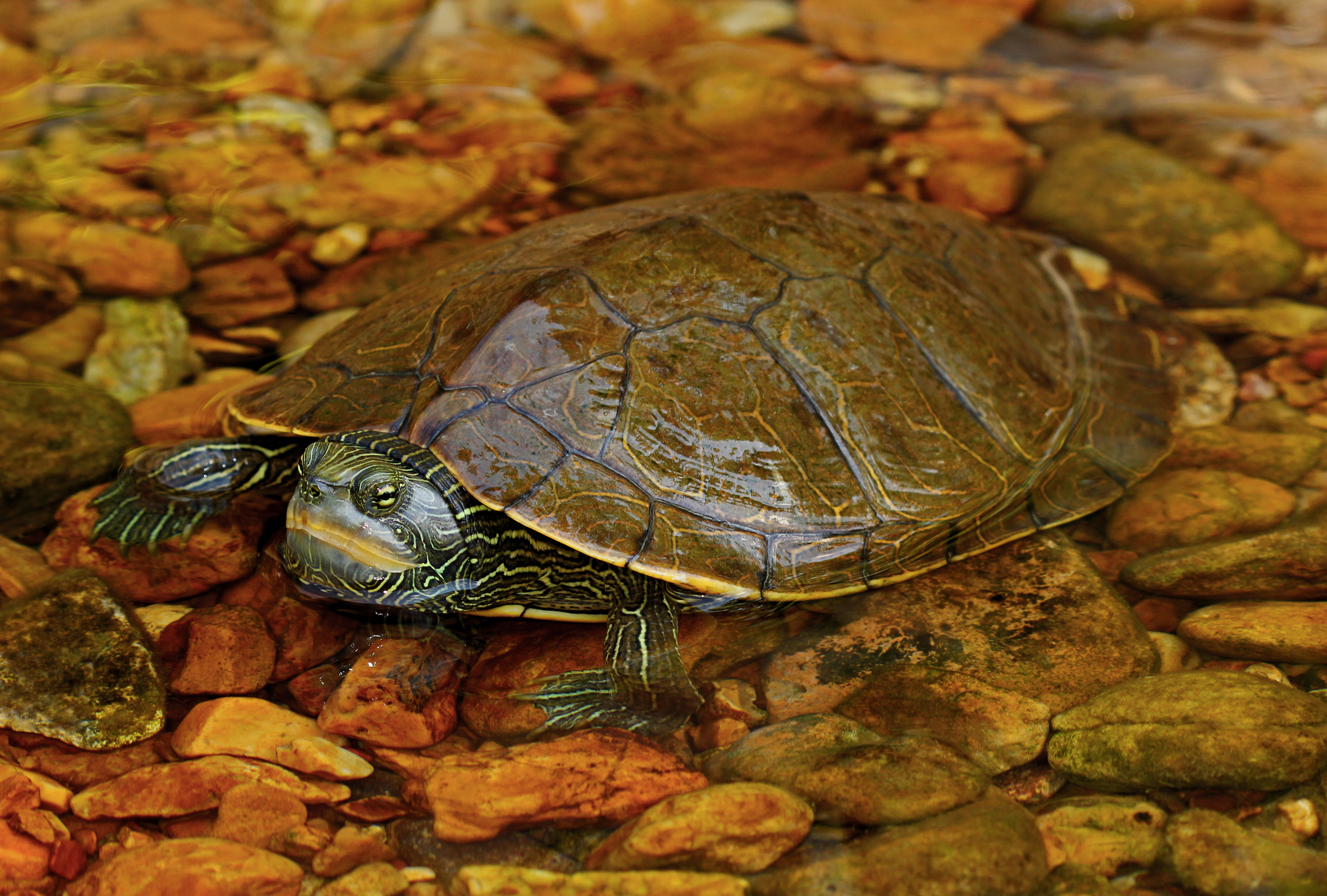
Northern map turtle (Graptemys geographica) from Shannon County, Missouri (27 August 2017)

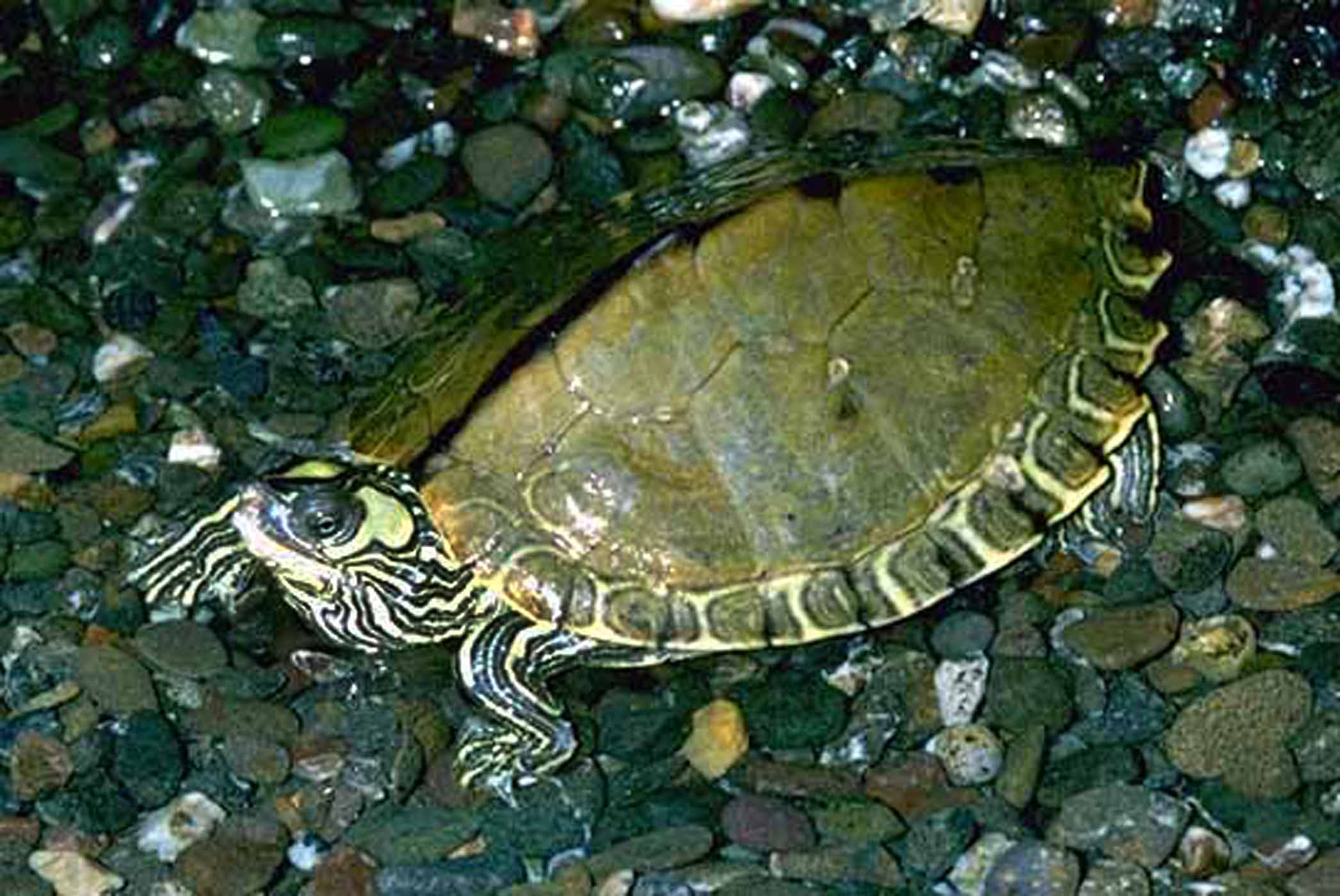
Pascagoula Map Turtle (Graptemys gibbonsi)

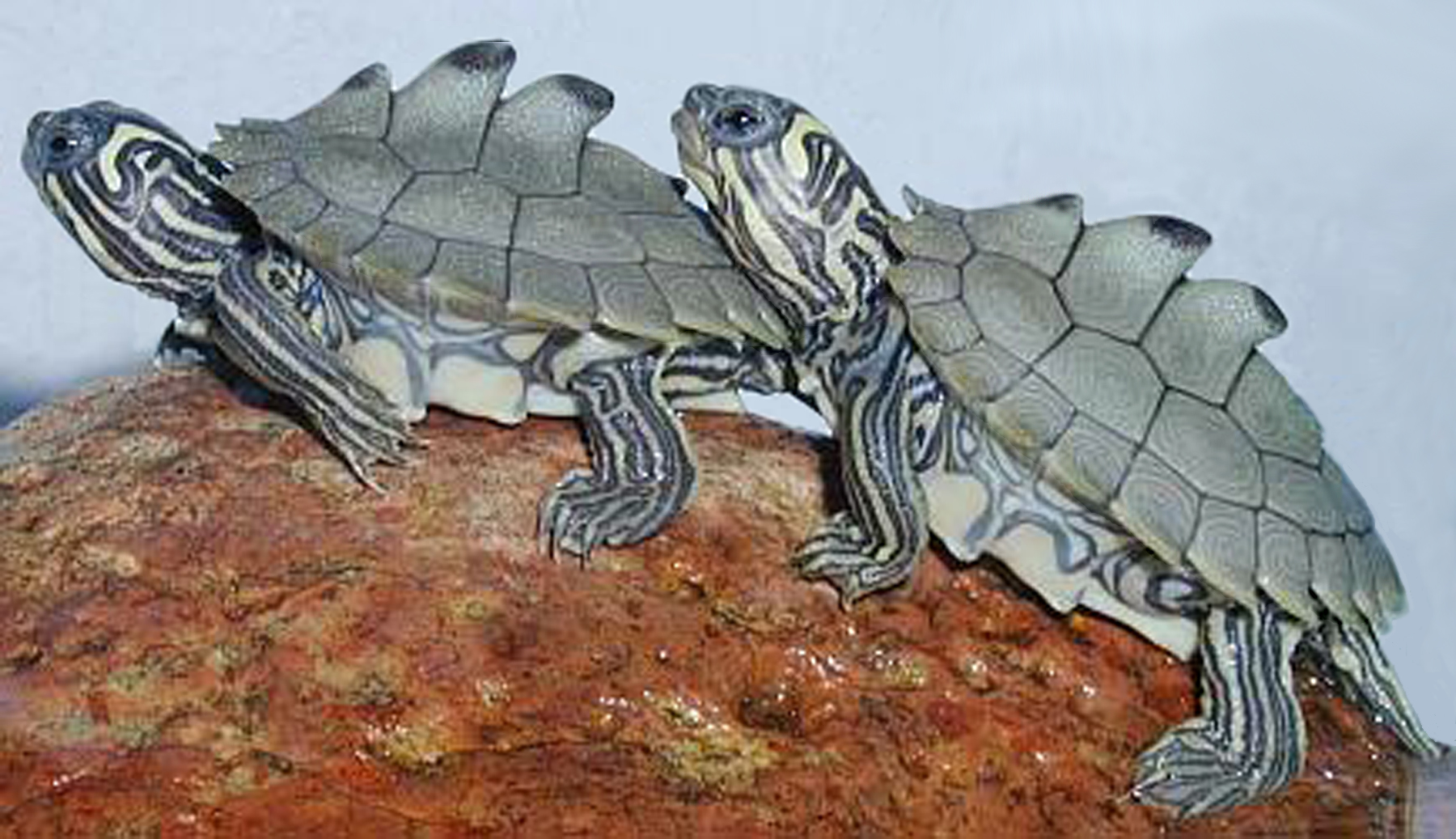
Black-knobbed map turtle (Graptemys nigrinoda), two hatchlings

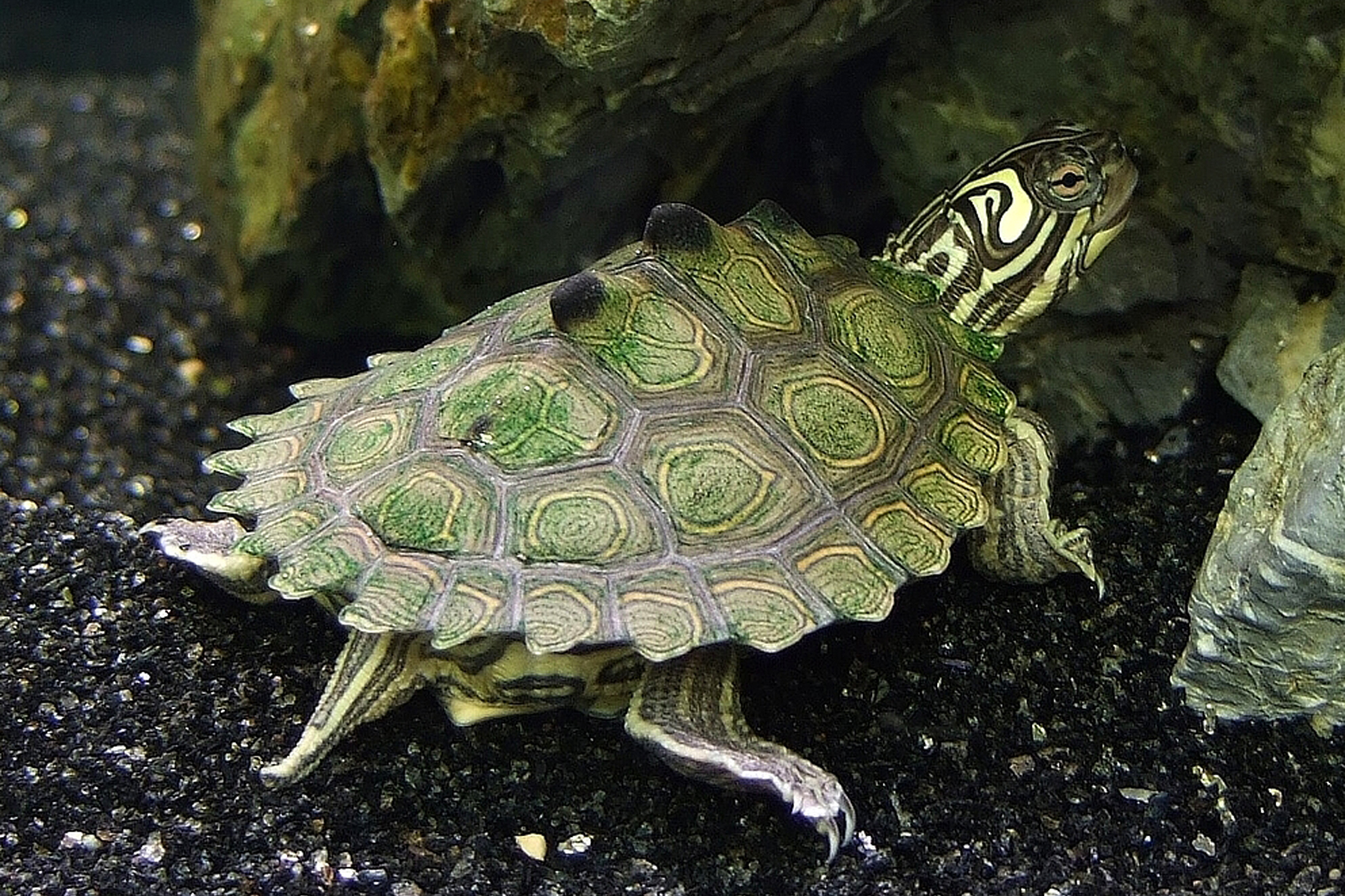
Black-knobbed map turtle (Graptemys nigrinoda), adult in an aquarium display

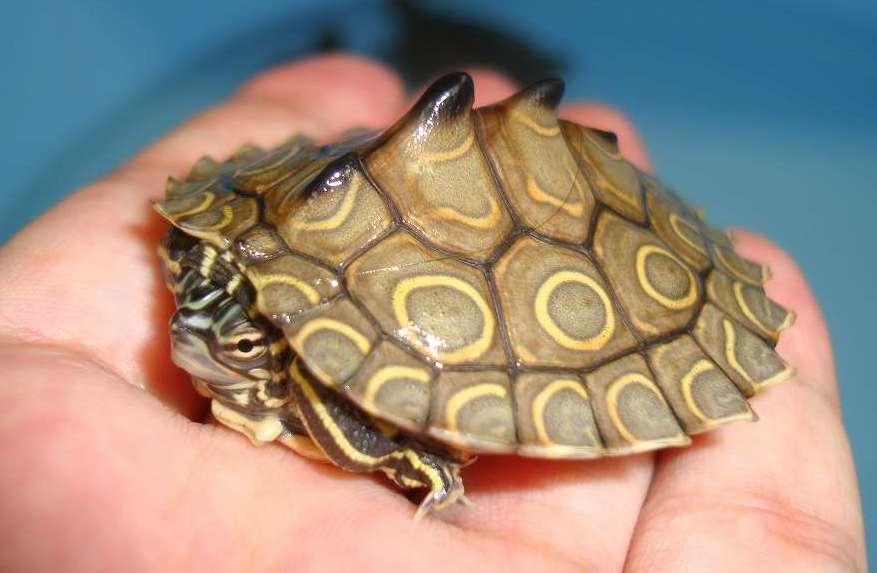
Ringed map turtle (Graptemys oculifera), juvenile

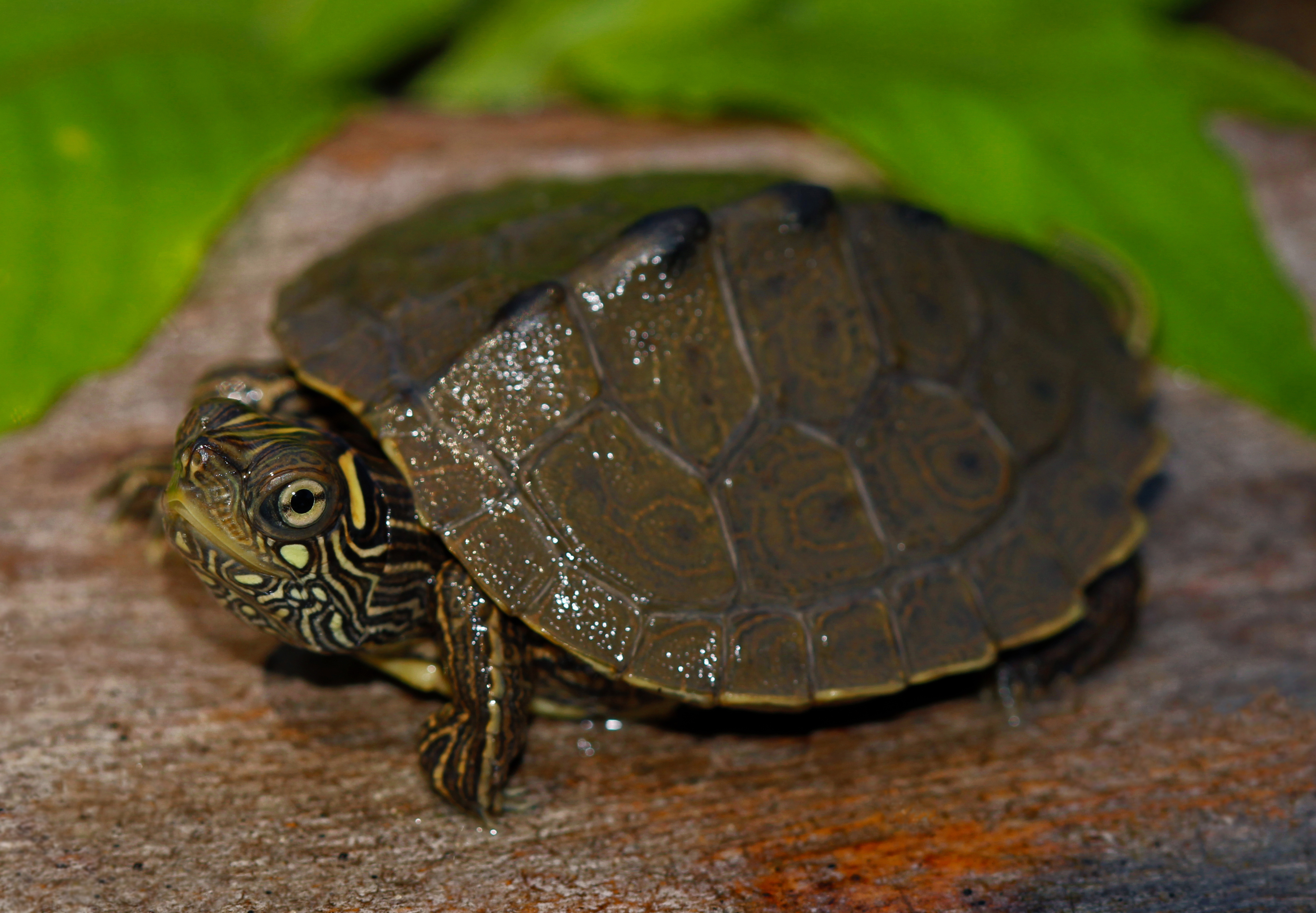
Ouachita map turtle (Graptemys ouachitensis), juvenile from St. Louis County, Missouri (26 May 2018)

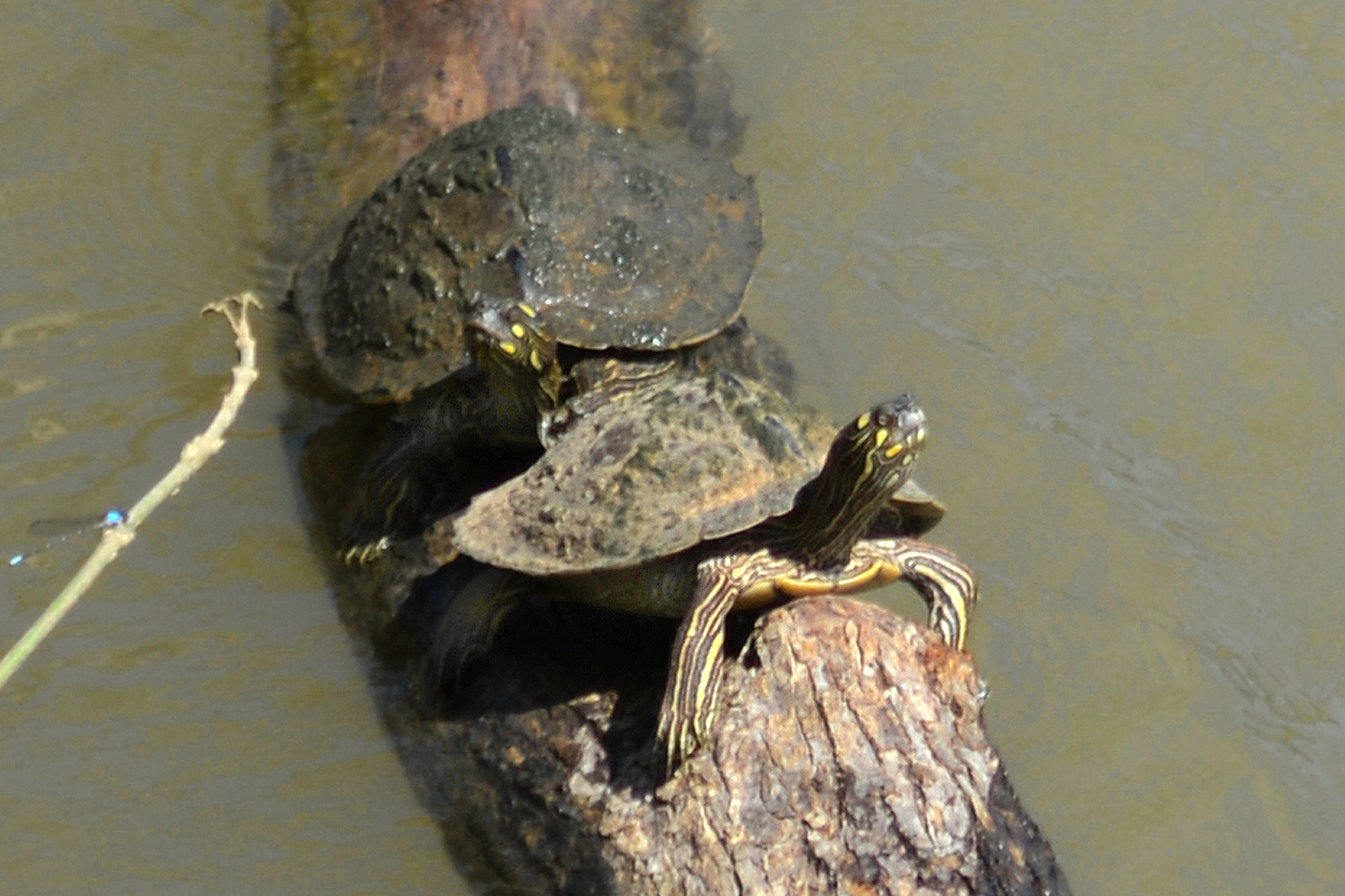
Ouachita map turtle (Graptemys ouachitensis) in situ, Red River, Fannin Co., Texas (24 June 2021)

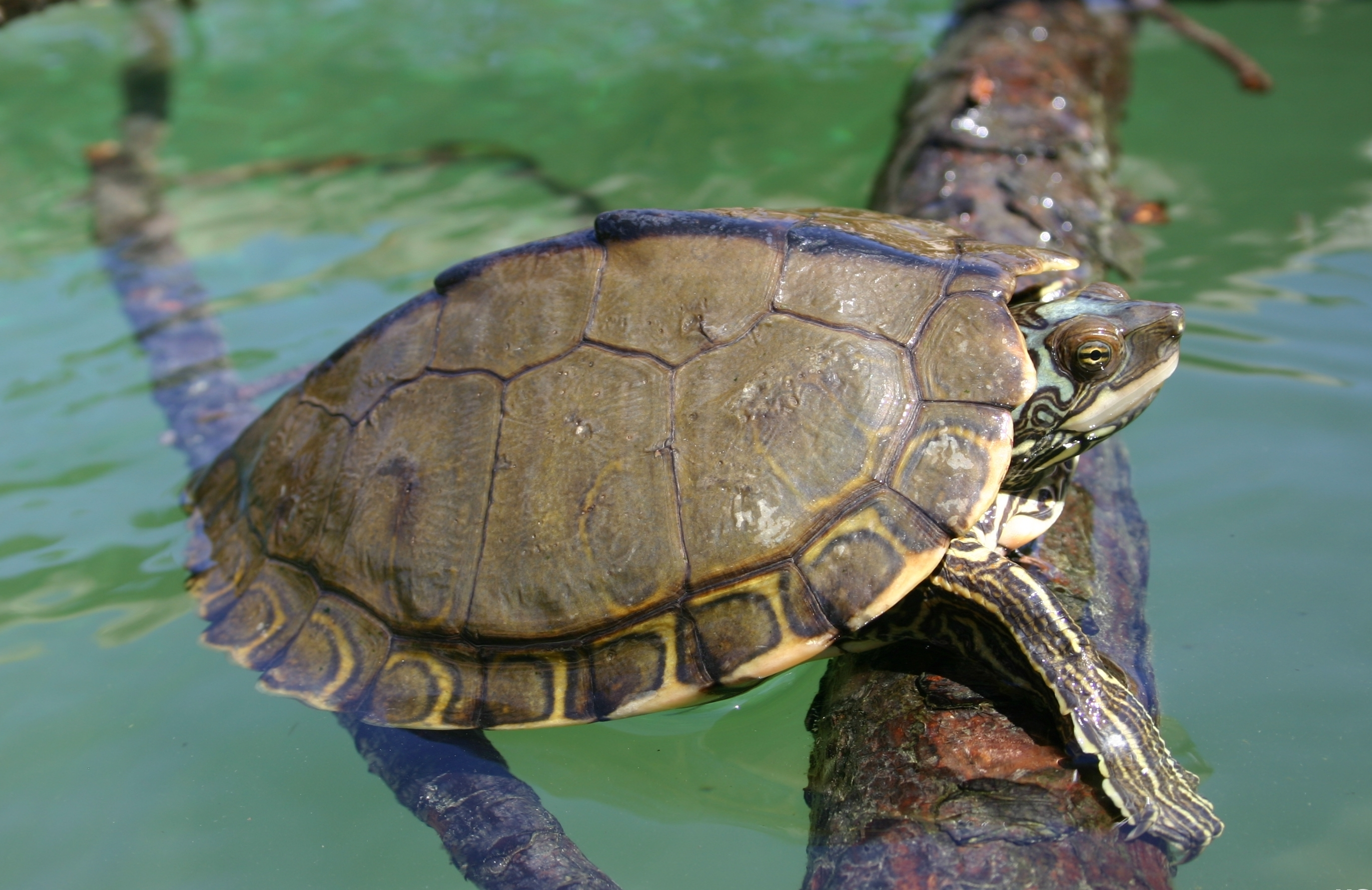
Pearl River map turtle (Graptemys pearlensis)

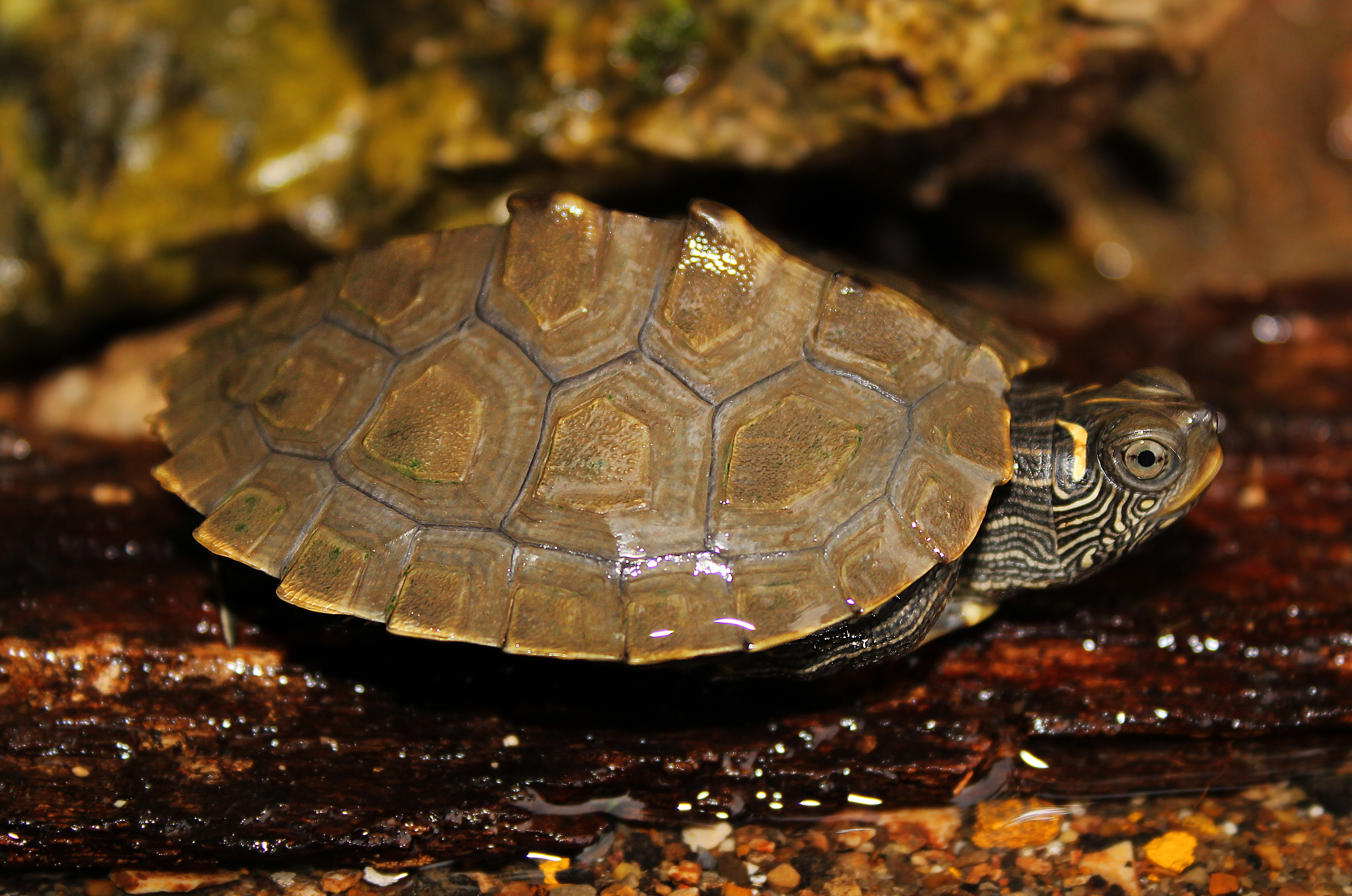
Northern false map turtle (Graptemys p. pseudogeographica), juvenile, St. Louis County, Missouri (27 June 2015)

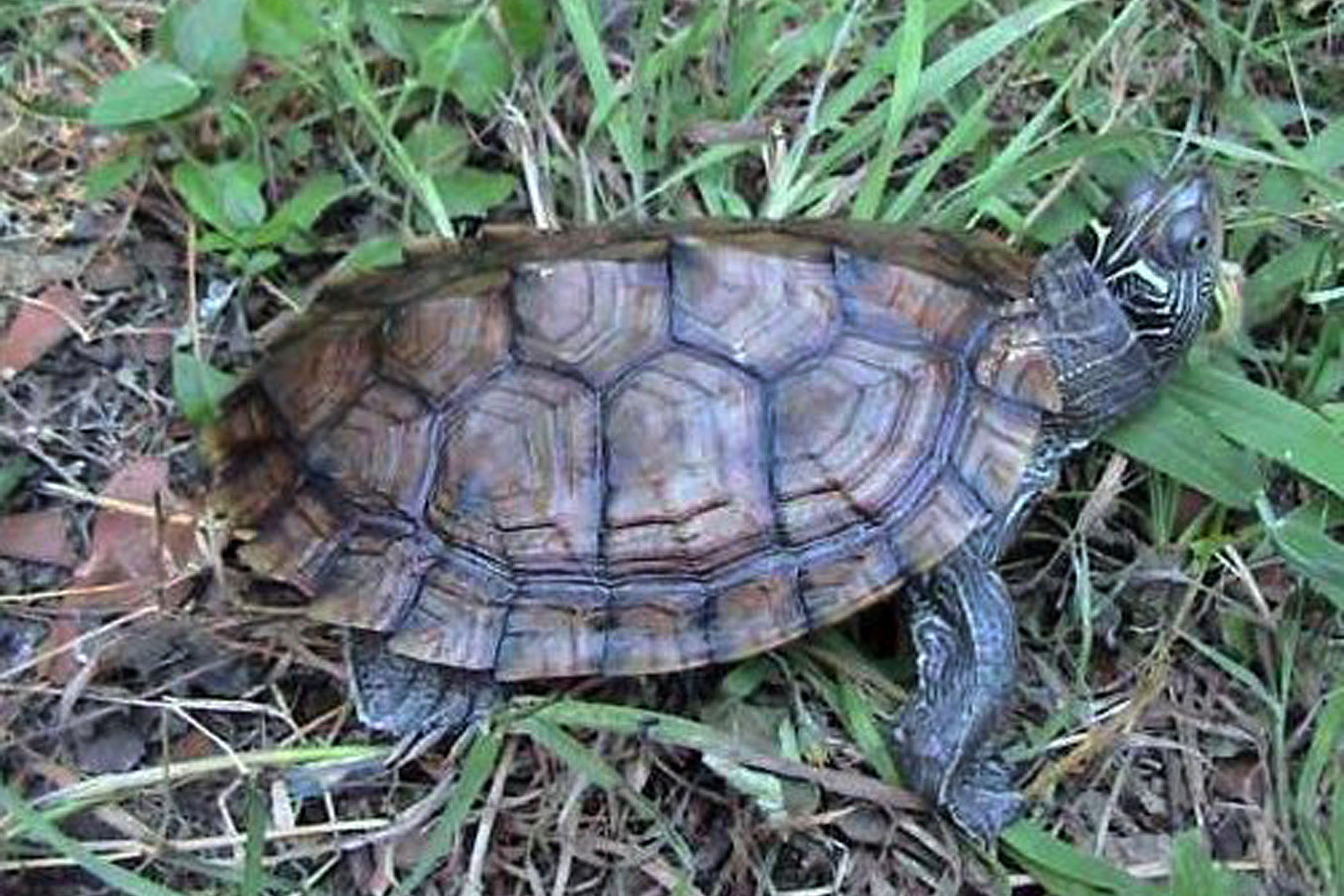
Northern false map turtle (Graptemys p. pseudogeographica), adult

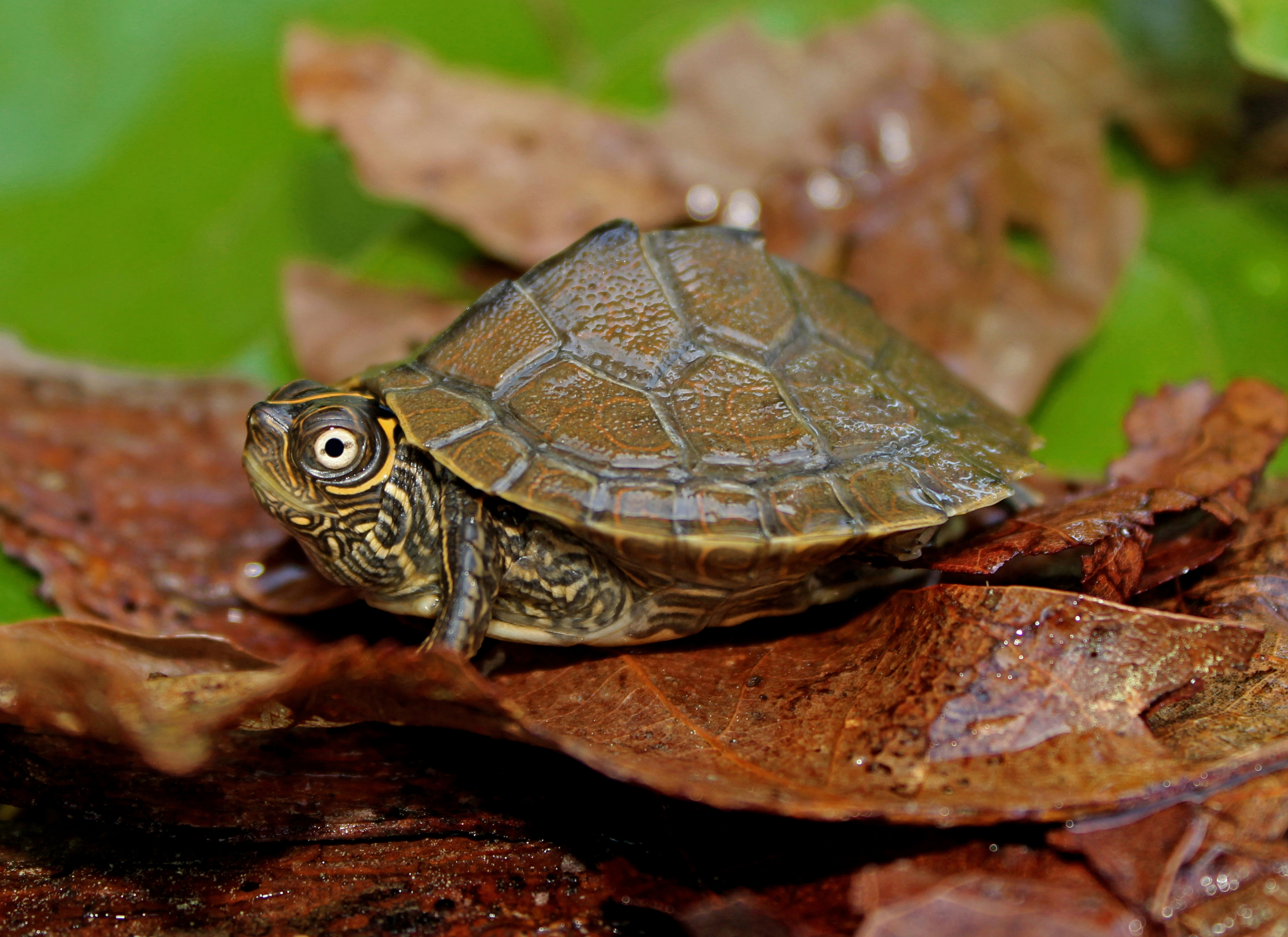
Mississippi map turtle (Graptemys pseudogeographica kohnii), juvenile from Pulaski County, Arkansas (28 April 2016)

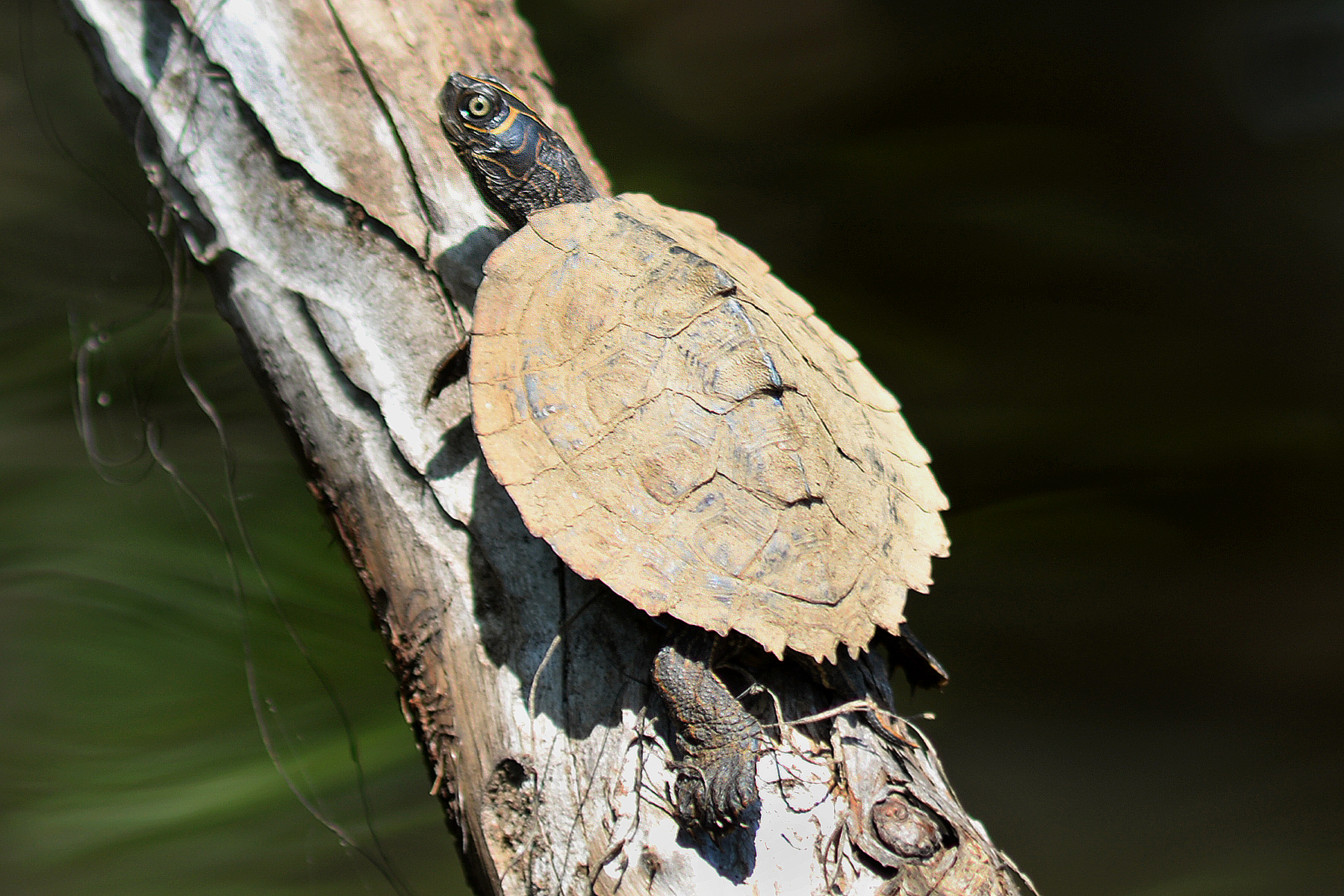
Mississippi map turtles (Graptemys pseudogeographica kohnii) in situ in Big Cypress Bayou, Harrison Co., Texas (13 April 2017)

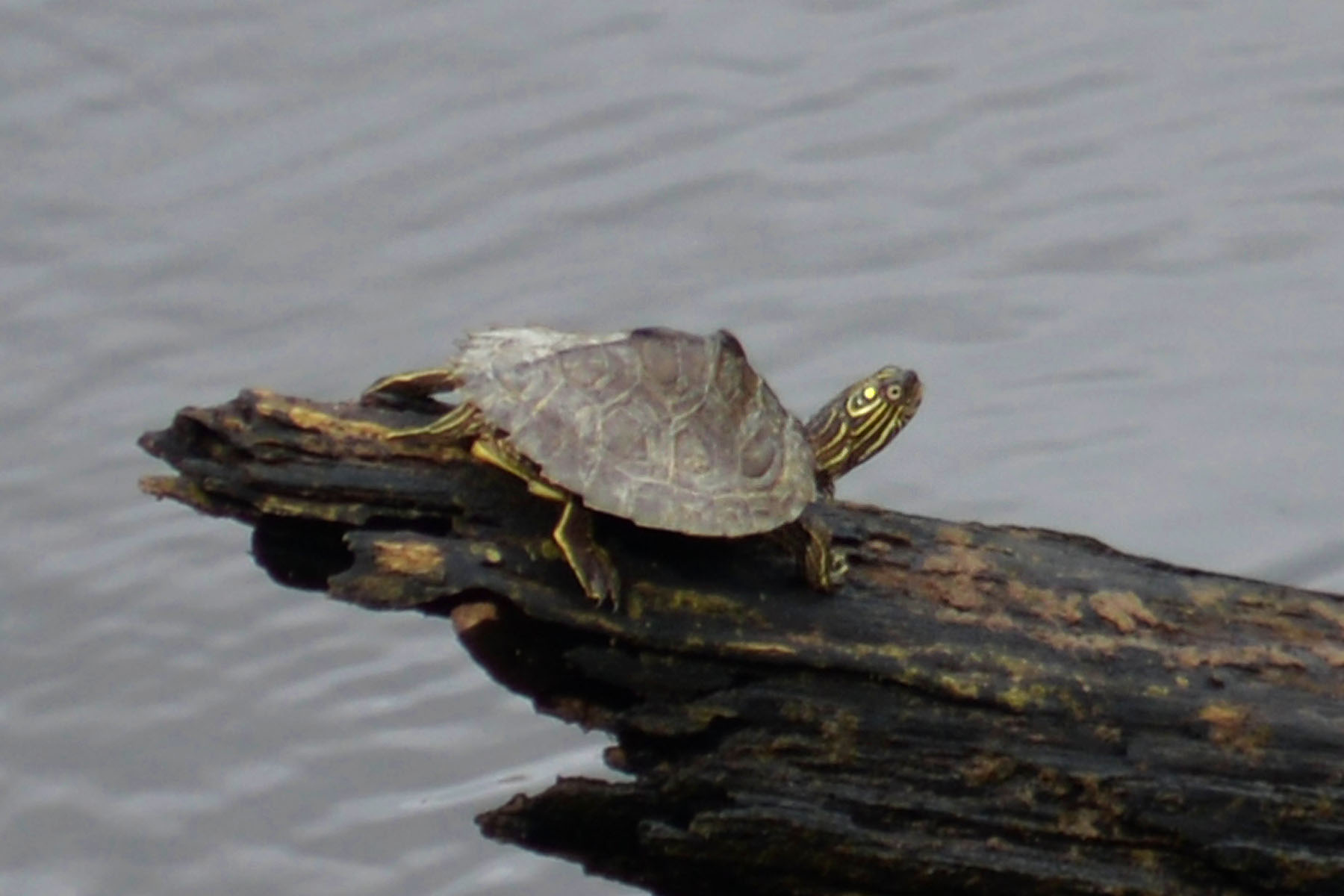
Sabine map turtle (Graptemys sabinensis) in situ, Village Creek (Neches River), Hardin Co., Texas (12 October 2021)

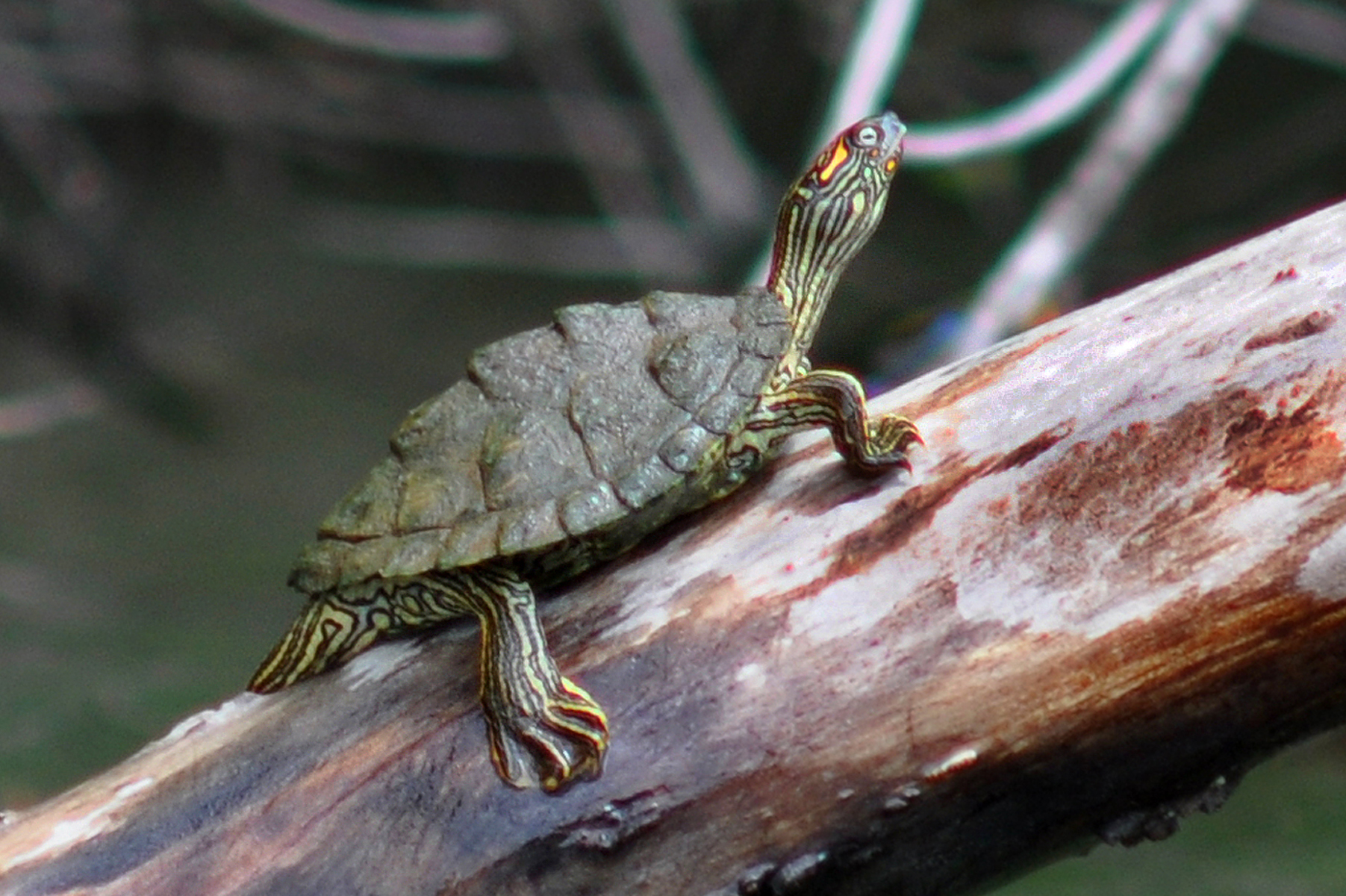
Texas map turtle (Graptemys versa) in situ, Colorado River, Travis Co., Texas (12 April 2012)

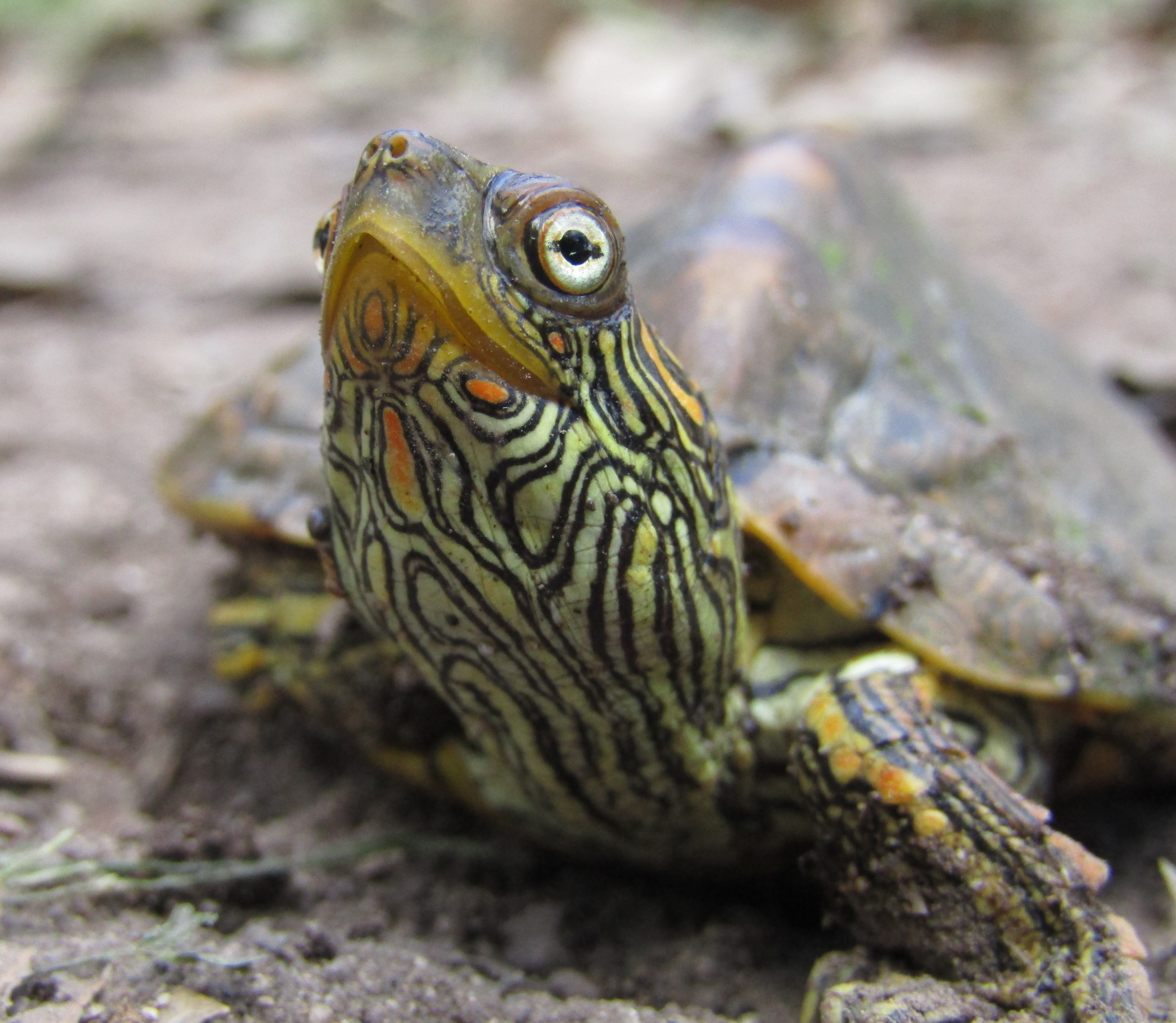
Texas map turtle (Graptemys versa) Kimble Co., Texas (7 October 2018)
