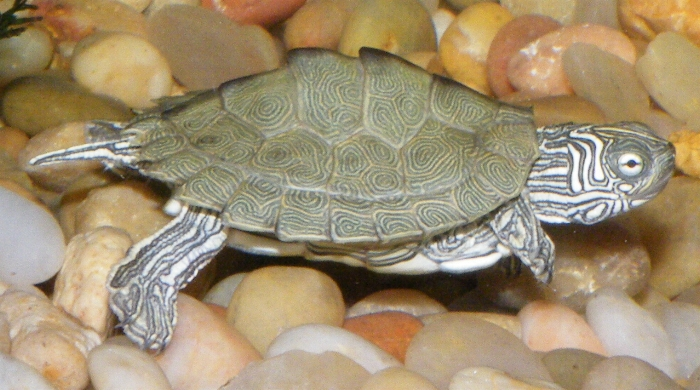
- Graptemys caglei, male hatchling

Conservation status
- Endangered (IUCN 3.1)

- Vulnerable (NatureServe)

Scientific classification
- Kingdom: Animalia
- Phylum: Chordata
- Class: Reptilia
- Order: Testudines
- Suborder: Cryptodira
- Family: Emydidae
- Genus: Graptemys
- Species: G. caglei

Binomial name
- Graptemys caglei Haynes & McKown, 1974
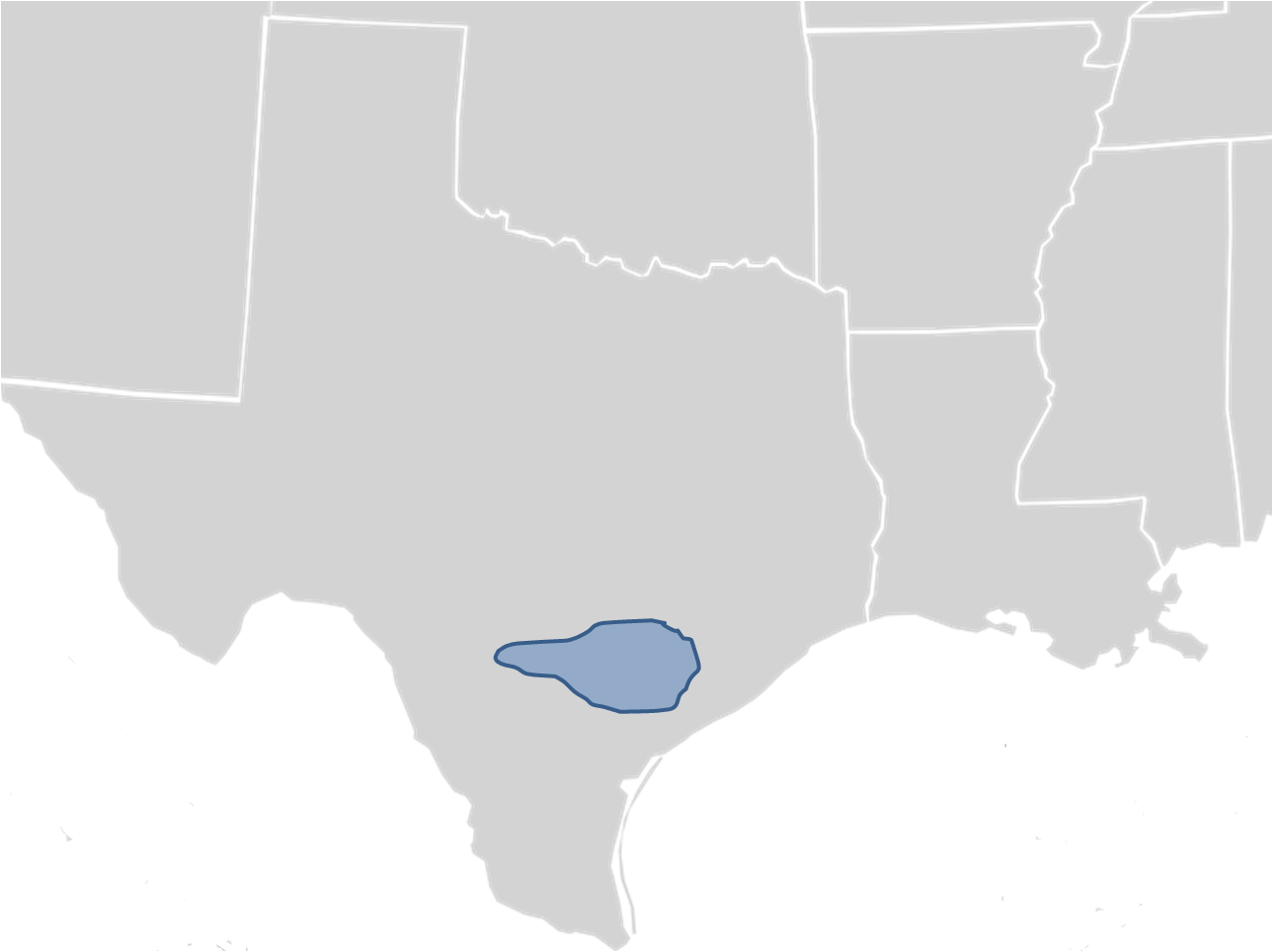
- Geographic range of Graptemys caglei

= Cagle's map turtle =

Species of turtle

Cagle's map turtle (Graptemys caglei) is a species of turtle in the family Emydidae. The species is endemic to Texas, where it is native to the Guadalupe, San Antonio, and San Marcos Rivers.

== Etymology ==
The specific name, caglei, is in honor of American herpetologist Dr. Fred Ray Cagle (1915–1968).

== Description ==
Cagle's map turtle has intricate patterns on the carapace and plastron, as well as serrated edges on the posterior of the carapace, as is typical of all map turtles. It is smaller than most map turtles, and very sexually dimorphic, with males reaching only 4 in (10 cm) straight carapace length, while females can exceed 7 in (18 cm) in straight carapace length.

== Diet ==
Adult females of G. caglei feed mainly on molluscs, but males and juveniles feed mainly on aquatic insects.

== Reproduction ==
Like all turtles, G. caglei is oviparous. A sexually mature female may lay up to three clutches of eggs in a year. Clutch size is small, only one to six eggs.
