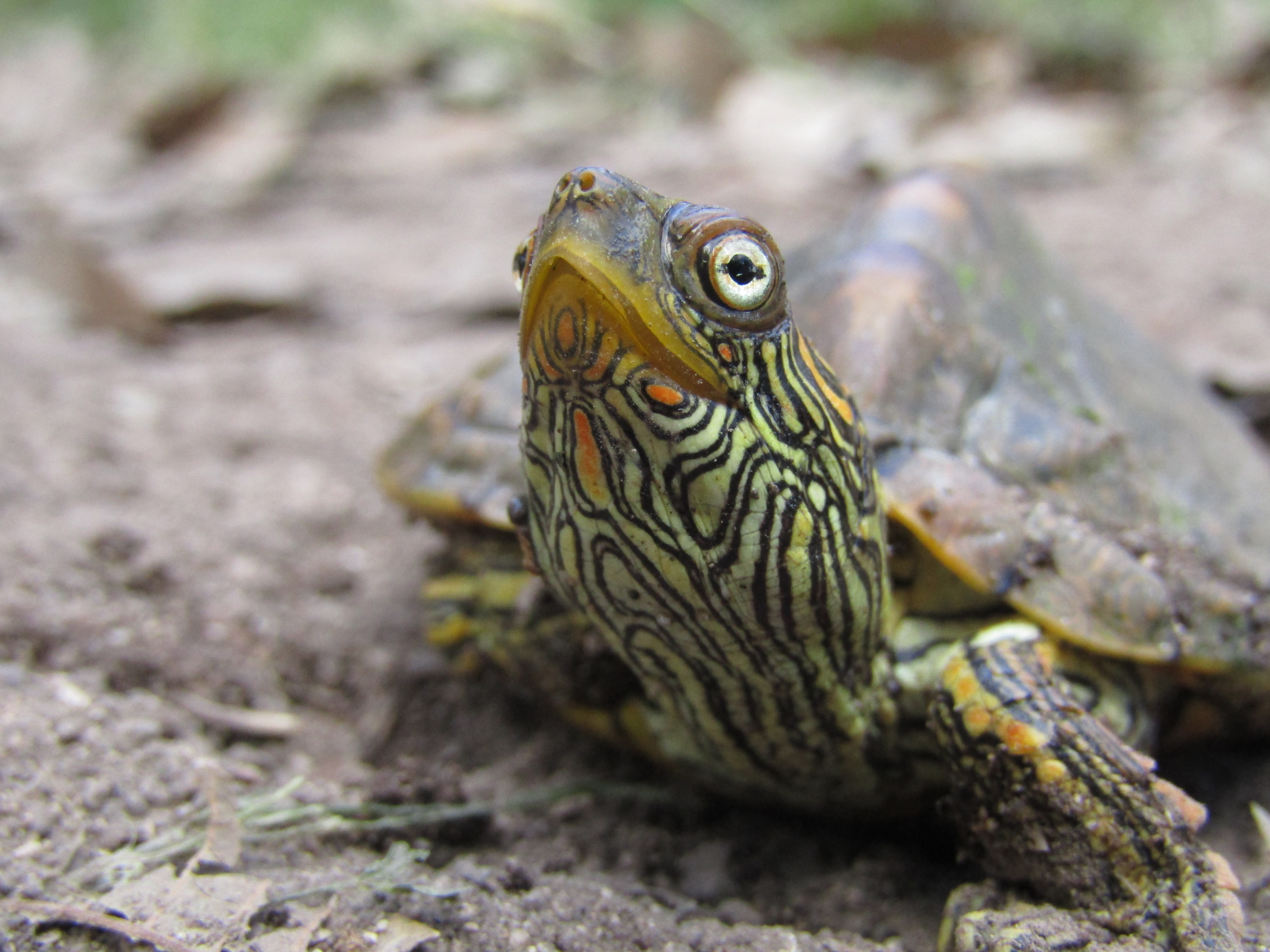
- A Texas map turtle in Kimble County, TX

Conservation status
- Least Concern (IUCN 3.1)

Scientific classification
- Kingdom: Animalia
- Phylum: Chordata
- Class: Reptilia
- Order: Testudines
- Suborder: Cryptodira
- Family: Emydidae
- Genus: Graptemys
- Species: G. versa

Binomial name
- Graptemys versa Stejneger, 1925
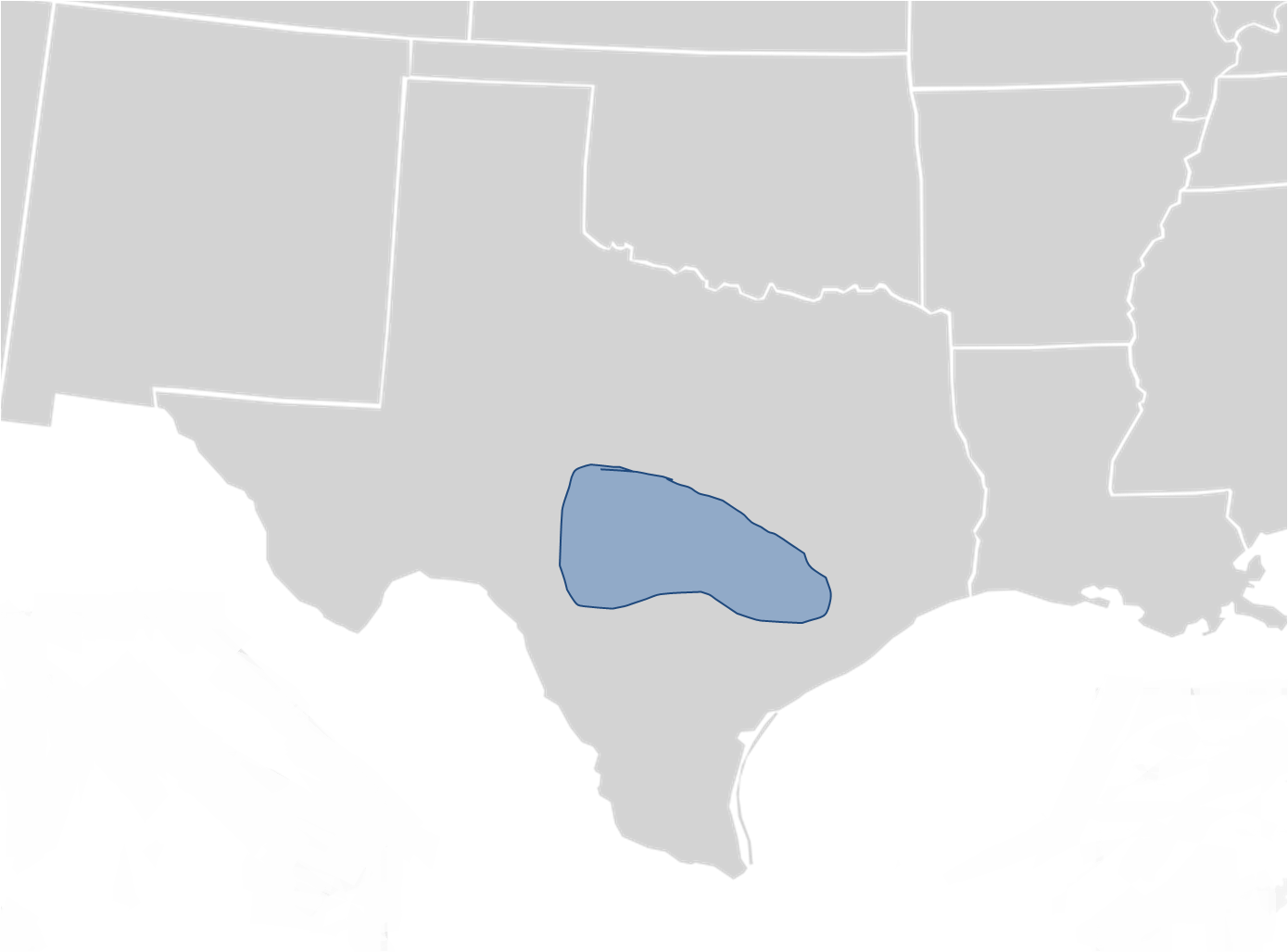
- Range map

Synonyms
- Graptemys pseudogeographica versa Stejneger, 1925; Graptemys versa — H.M. Smith, 1946; Malaclemys versa — McDowell, 1964; Graptemys versa — Conant, 1975

= Texas map turtle =

Species of turtle

The Texas map turtle (Graptemys versa) is a species of emydid turtle endemic to Texas.

== Geographic range ==
Endemic to Texas within the Colorado River (Texas) drainage

== Description ==
Graptemys versa is a smaller turtle; females only attain a carapace length of 21.4 cm (8.4 in). Males are even smaller, only attaining a carapace length of 9.0 cm (3.5 in). When viewed dorsally, the carapace is oval-shaped with the widest part just above the rear legs. The posterior marginals are serrated and the carapacial scutes are convex. A medial keel is present on the vertebral scutes with the most prominent keels being located on the first three. The apex of these scutes are yellowish but often become worn down with age. The base coloration of the carapace is olive green with yellow reticulations. Juveniles and young adults often bear some slight pattern along the central seams of the plastral scutes. However, some adults have a creamy yellow plastron free of markings.

== Diet ==
Map turtle researcher Peter Lindeman has documented the following dietary items from Texas map turtles: Freshwater sponges, algae, seeds, Asian clams, various aquatic insects, leeches, and crayfish.
