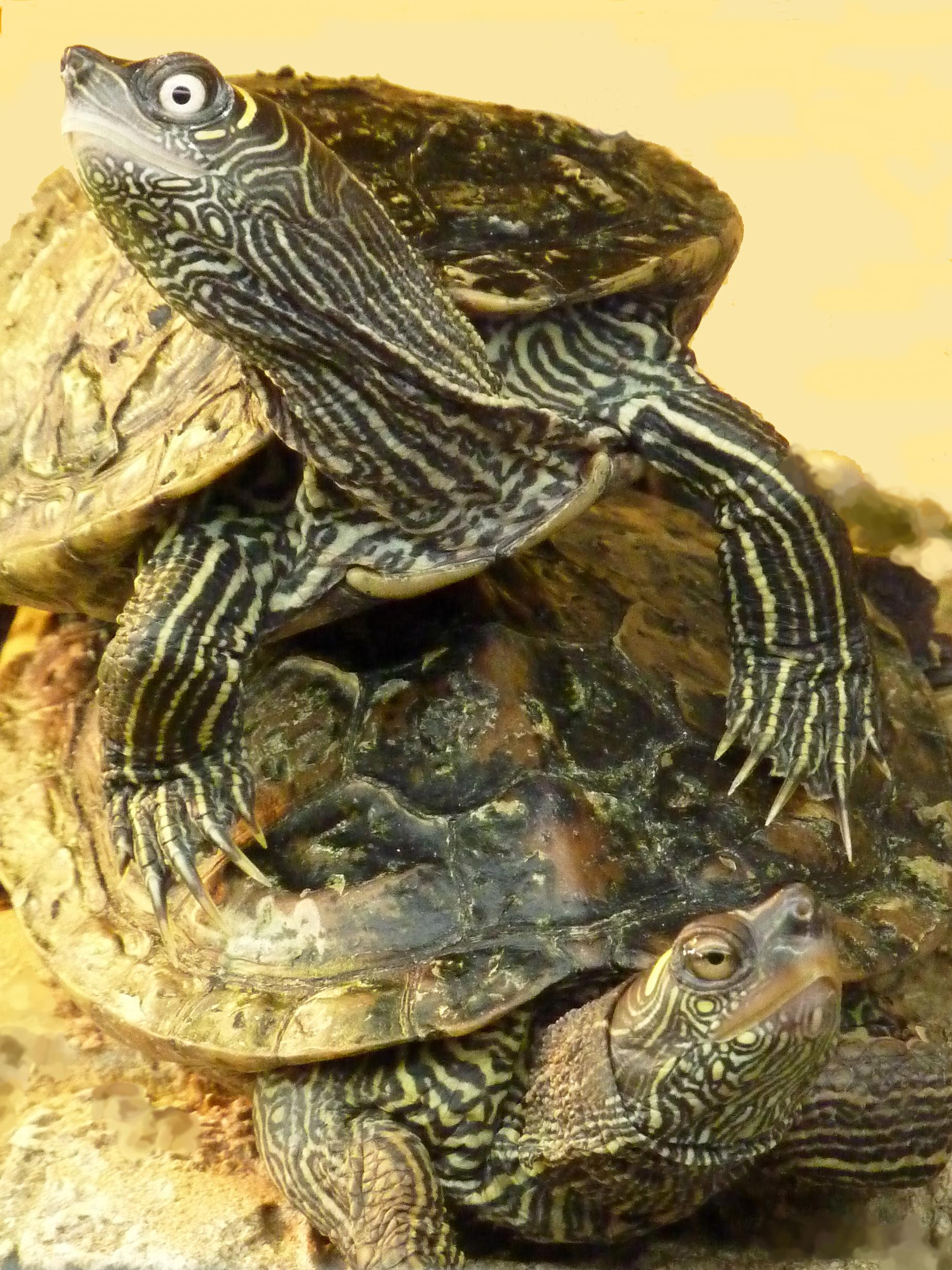
- Top: Mississippi Map Turtle; Bottom: False Map Turtle

Conservation status
- Least Concern (IUCN 3.1)

Scientific classification
- Kingdom: Animalia
- Phylum: Chordata
- Class: Reptilia
- Order: Testudines
- Suborder: Cryptodira
- Family: Emydidae
- Genus: Graptemys
- Species: G. pseudogeographica
- Subspecies: G. p. kohnii

Trinomial name
- Graptemys pseudogeographica kohnii (Baur, 1890)

Synonyms
- Malacoclemmys kohnii Baur, 1890; Graptemys kohnii — Baur, 1893; Malaclemys lesueurii kohnii — Siebenrock, 1909; Graptemys pseudogeographica kohnii — Stejneger & Barbour, 1917; Graptemys pseudogeographica kohni — Mertens, 1934; Graptemys kohni — Cagle, 1953; Malaclemys kohni — McDowell, 1964; Graptemys khonii Ferri, 2002 (ex errore); Graptemys pseudogeographica kohnii — Rhodin et al., 2010

= Mississippi map turtle =

Subspecies of turtle

The Mississippi map turtle (Graptemys pseudogeographica kohnii), also known commonly as Kohn's map turtle, is a subspecies of land and water turtle belonging to the family Emydidae. G. p. kohnii is native to the central United States.

== Etymology ==
The common name, Mississippi map turtle, derives not from the state of Mississippi, but rather from the Mississippi River.

The specific name, kohnii, is in honor of amateur naturalist Joseph Gustave Kohn (1837–1906) of New Orleans, Louisiana, who collected the type specimen.

== Geographic range ==
G. p. kohnii is found along the Mississippi River and its tributaries, from Illinois and Missouri southward.

== Description ==
The gray carapace of G. p. kohnii is covered in yellow lines which resemble contour lines of a map.
