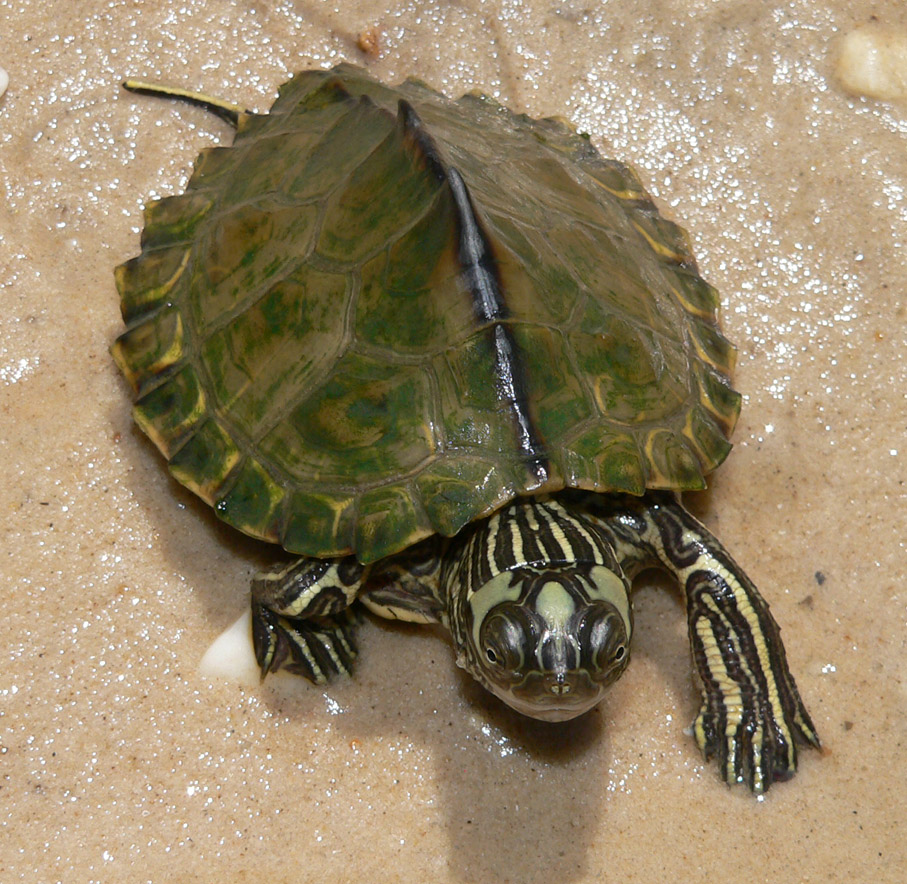
- Graptemys ernsti

Conservation status
- Near Threatened (IUCN 3.1)
- CITES Appendix II

Scientific classification
- Kingdom: Animalia
- Phylum: Chordata
- Class: Reptilia
- Order: Testudines
- Suborder: Cryptodira
- Family: Emydidae
- Genus: Graptemys
- Species: G. ernsti

Binomial name
- Graptemys ernsti Lovich & McCoy, 1992
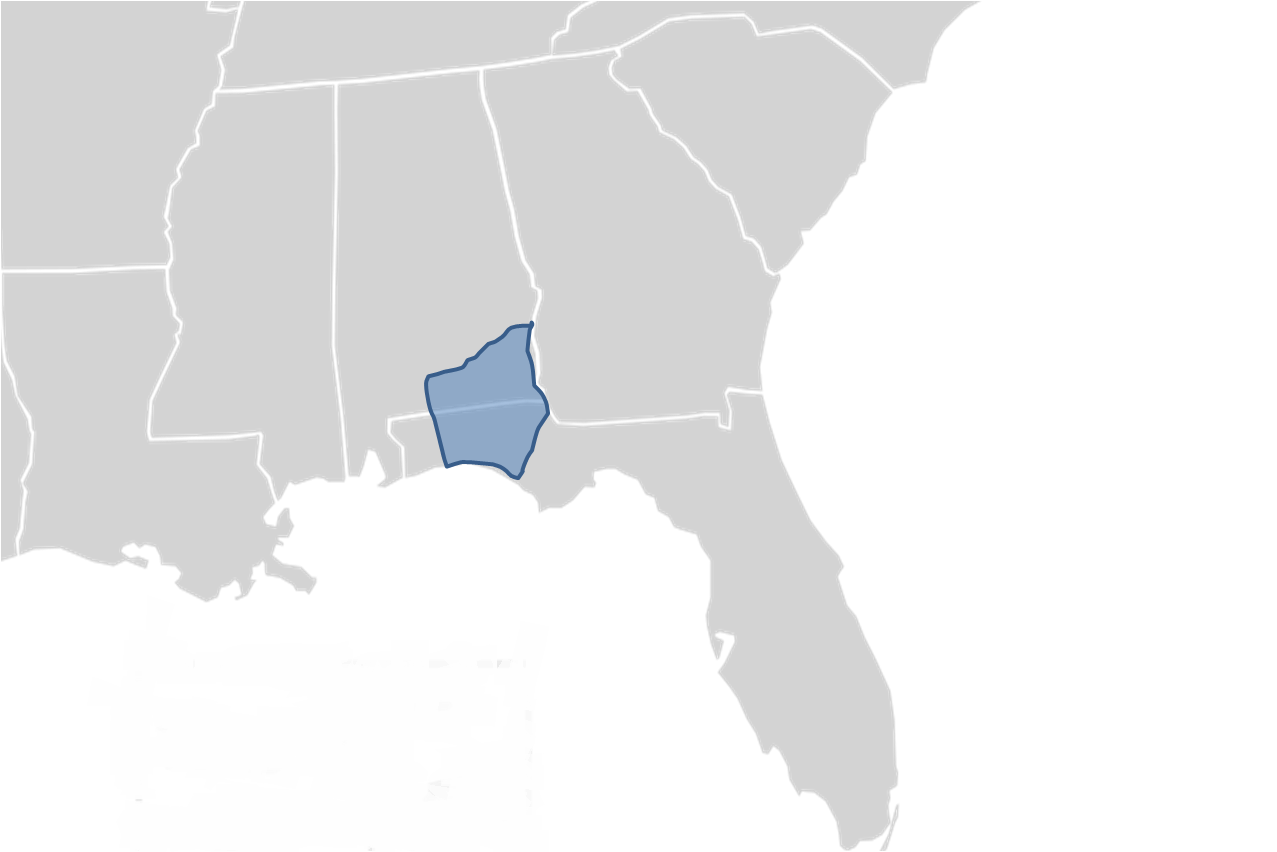
- Range map

Synonyms
- Graptemys ernsti Lovich & McCoy, 1992; Graptemys emstii Ferri, 2002 (ex errore); Graptemys pulchra ernsti — Artner, 2003

= Escambia map turtle =

Species of turtle

The Escambia map turtle (Graptemys ernsti), also known commonly as Ernst's map turtle, is a species of turtle in the family Emydidae. The species is endemic to the United States.

== Geographic range ==
Graptemys ernsti is found in southern Alabama and western Florida, in rivers which drain into Escambia Bay.

== Habitat ==
The preferred natural habitat of Graptemys ernsti is flowing fresh water, in medium to large creeks and rivers.

== Etymology ==
The specific name, ernsti, is in honor of American herpetologist Carl Henry Ernst.

== Description ==
Females of Graptemys ernsti are larger than males. Females may attain a straight carapace length of 28.5 cm (11.2 in), but males only grow to a straight carapace length of 13 cm (5.1 in).

== Diet ==
The diet of Graptemys ernsti varies according to age and gender. Males and juveniles prey predominately upon insects, but females prey almost entirely upon snails and clams, including the invasive species Corbicula fluminea.

== Reproduction ==
Males of Graptemys ernsti reach sexual maturity at an age of 3–4 years, but females don't reach sexual maturity until an age of 14–19 years. Each sexually mature female lays an average of 4 clutches a year, with an average clutch size of 7 eggs.
