= List of snakes of Indiana =

All 39 snake taxa that are known to naturally occur in Indiana are tabulated below, along with their population ranges in the state, conservation status, and level of danger they pose to humans (upon biting them).

Photo	Scientific name	Common name	State Distribution	Conservation Status	Threat to Humans
	Agkistrodon contortrix mokasen	Northern copperhead	southern 1/2	unknown	moderate
	Agkistrodon piscivorus leucostoma	Western cottonmouth	Dubois and Harrison counties	state endangered	high
	Carphophis amoenus helenae	Midwestern worm snake	southern 1/2	unknown	minimal
	Cemophora coccinea copei	Northern scarlet snake	Floyd county	state endangered	minimal
	Clonophis kirtlandii	Kirtland's snake	everywhere but southwest	state endangered	minimal
	Coluber constrictor foxii	Blue racer	northern 2/3	common	minimal
	Coluber constrictor priapus	Southern black racer	southern 1/3	common	minimal
	Crotalus horridus	Timber rattlesnake	southern 1/3	state endangered	very high
	Diadophis punctatus edwardsii	Northern ringneck snake	everywhere but central 2/3	uncommon	minimal
	Farancia abacura reinwardtii	Western mud snake	southwestern tip	state endangered (extirpated)	minimal
	Heterodon platirhinos	Eastern hognose snake	throughout	uncommon	minimal
	Lampropeltis calligaster calligaster	Prairie kingsnake	southwest, southcentral, and along western border	uncommon	minimal
	Lampropeltis nigra	Black kingsnake	southwestern 1/3	common	minimal
	Lampropeltis triangulum syspila	Red milk snake	southwest	common	minimal
	Lampropeltis triangulum triangulum	Eastern milk snake	everywhere but southwest	common	minimal
	Nerodia erythrogaster neglecta	Copperbelly water snake	southern 1/3 and northeast corner	state endangered, federally threatened	minimal
	Nerodia rhombifer rhombifer	Northern diamondback water snake	southwestern corner	abundant	minimal
	Nerodia sipedon pleuralis	Midland water snake	southern 1/2	common	minimal
	Nerodia sipedon sipedon	Northern water snake	throughout	common	minimal
	Opheodrys aestivus aestivus	Northern rough green snake	southern 1/3	special concern	minimal
	Opheodrys vernalis blanchardi	Western smooth green snake	northwest	state endangered	minimal
	Pantherophis ramspotti	Western Fox snake	northwestern corner	uncommon	minimal
	Pantherophis alleghaniensis	Gray rat snake	throughout	common	minimal
	Pituophis catenifer sayi	Bullsnake	northwest	uncommon	minimal
	Regina septemvittata	Queen snake	everywhere but southwestern corner	uncommon	minimal
	Sistrurus catenatus catenatus	Eastern massasauga rattlesnake	northern 1/3	state endangered, federal candidate	high
	Storeria dekayi dekayi	Northern brown snake	northeast corner	abundant	minimal
	Storeria dekayi wrightorum	Midland brown snake	throughout	abundant	minimal
	Storeria occipitomaculata occipitomaculata	Northern redbelly snake	everywhere but central 2/3	uncommon	minimal
	Tantilla coronata	Southeastern crowned snake	Floyd and Clark counties	state endangered	minimal
	Thamnophis butleri	Butler's garter snake	northeast	state endangered	minimal
	Thamnophis proximus proximus	Western ribbon snake	everywhere but southeast and eastcentral	special concern	minimal
	Thamnophis radix	Plains garter snake	northwest	uncommon	minimal
	Thamnophis saurita saurita	Eastern ribbon snake	southwest and southcentral	common	minimal
	Thamnophis saurita septentrionalis	Northern ribbon snake	northern 2/3	common	minimal
	Thamnophis sirtalis semifasciatus	Chicago garter snake	Porter county	unknown	minimal
	Thamnophis sirtalis sirtalis	Eastern garter snake	throughout	abundant	minimal
	Virginia valeriae elegans	Western earth snake	southwestern 1/3	uncommon	minimal
