= List of snakes of Illinois =

This is a list of snake species known to be found in the U.S. state of Illinois. Concerns and listed statuses come from the Illinois Endangered Species Protection Board's February 2011 Checklist of endangered and threatened animals and plants of Illinois and the Illinois Natural History Survey's website.

Image	Scientific name	Common name	Family	Venomous	Conservation concern
	Agkistrodon contortrix	Eastern copperhead	Viperidae	Yes	Locally abundant
	Agkistrodon piscivorus	Northern cottonmouth Water moccasin	Viperidae	Yes	Locally abundant
	Carphophis amoenus helenae	Midwestern worm snake	Colubridae	No	Locally abundant
	Carphophis vermis	Midwestern worm snake	Colubridae	No	Locally abundant
	Clonophis kirtlandii	Kirtland's snake	Colubridae	No	State Threatened
	Cemophora coccinea copei	Northern scarlet snake	Colubridae	No	Current existence in IL uncertain. Single specimen vouchered in 1942.
	Coluber constrictor foxii	Blue racer	Colubridae	No	
	Coluber constrictor priapus	Southern black racer	Colubridae	No	Locally common
	Crotalus horridus	Timber rattlesnake Canebrake rattlesnake	Viperidae	Yes	State Threatened
	Diadophis punctatus arnyi	Prairie ringneck snake	Colubridae	No	Locally abundant
	Diadophis punctatus edwardsii	Northern ringneck snake	Colubridae	No	Locally abundant
	Diadophis punctatus stictogenys	Mississippi ringneck snake	Colubridae	No	Locally abundant
	Farancia abacura reinwardtii	Western mud snake	Colubridae	No	Rarely seen
	Heterodon nasicus gloydi	Dusty hognose snake	Colubridae	No	
	Heterodon nasicus nasicus	Plains hognose snake	Colubridae	No	State Threatened
	Heterodon platirhinos	Eastern hognose snake	Colubridae	No	Locally common
	Lampropeltis calligaster calligaster	Prairie kingsnake	Colubridae	No	Locally common
	Lampropeltis getula holbrooki	Speckled kingsnake	Colubridae	No	Locally common
	Lampropeltis getula niger	Black kingsnake	Colubridae	No	Locally common
	Lampropeltis triangulum triangulum	Eastern milk snake	Colubridae	No	Not commonly seen
	Lampropeltis triangulum syspila	Red milk snake	Colubridae	No	Not commonly seen
	Masticophis flagellum flagellum	Eastern coachwhip	Colubridae	No	State Endangered
	Nerodia cyclopion	Mississippi green water snake	Colubridae	No	State Threatened
	Nerodia erythrogaster flavigaster	Yellowbelly water snake	Colubridae	No	
	Nerodia erythrogaster neglecta	Copperbelly water snake	Colubridae	No	"protected as though it were listed in Illinois"
	Nerodia fasciata confluens	Broad-banded water snake	Colubridae	No	State Endangered
	Nerodia rhombifer	Diamondback water snake	Colubridae	No	Locally common
	Nerodia sipedon pleuralis	Midland water snake	Colubridae	No	
	Nerodia sipedon sipedon	Northern water snake	Colubridae	No	Abundant
	Opheodrys aestivus	Rough green snake	Colubridae	No	Locally abundant
	Opheodrys vernalis	Smooth green snake	Colubridae	No	Not abundant
	Pantherophis emoryi	Great Plains ratsnake	Colubridae	No	State Endangered
	Pantherophis spiloides	Gray ratsnake	Colubridae	No	Locally common
	Pantherophis vulpina	Western fox snake	Colubridae	No	Locally common
	Pituophis catenifer sayi	Gophersnake; Bullsnake	Colubridae	No	Locally common
	Regina grahamii	Graham's crayfish snake	Colubridae	No	Widespread but uncommon
	Regina septemvittata	Queen snake	Colubridae	No	Locally abundant
	Sistrurus catenatus catenatus	Eastern massasauga	Viperidae	Yes	
	Storeria dekayi wrightorum	Midland brown snake De Kay's brown snake	Colubridae	No	Common
	Storeria occipitomaculata occipitomaculata	Northern redbelly snake	Colubridae	No	Locally abundant
	Tantilla gracilis	Flat-headed snake	Colubridae	No	State Threatened
	Thamnophis proximus proximus	Western ribbon snake	Colubridae	No	Locally common
	Thamnophis radix	Plains garter snake	Colubridae	No	Common in north half of state
	Thamnophis saurita saurita	Eastern ribbon snake	Colubridae	No	State Threatened
	Thamnophis saurita septentrionalis	Northern ribbon snake	Colubridae	No	
	Thamnophis sirtalis semifasciatus	Chicago garter snake	Colubridae	No	
	Thamnophis sirtalis sirtalis	Common garter snake	Colubridae	No	Common
	Tropidoclonion lineatum lineatum	Northern lined snake	Colubridae	No	State Threatened
	Virginia valeriae elegans	Western earth snake	Colubridae	No	
