= List of snakes of Kentucky =

Kentucky snakes

This is a list of snakes found in Kentucky.

Common name	Scientific name	Venomous	Image
Eastern copperhead	Agkistrodon contortrix	Venomous	
Timber rattlesnake	Crotalus horridus	Venomous	
Northern cottonmouth	Agkistrodon piscivorus	Venomous	
Western pygmy rattlesnake	Sistrurus miliarius streckeri	Venomous	
Black Kingsnake	Lampropeltis nigra	Non-venomous	
Broadbanded water snake	Nerodia fasciata confluens	Non-venomous	
Common watersnake	Nerodia sipedon	Non-venomous	
Copperbelly water snake	Nerodia erythrogaster neglecta	Non-venomous	
Corn snake	Pantherophis guttatus	Non-venomous	
DeKay's brown snake	Storeria dekayi	Non-venomous	
Diamondback water snake	Nerodia rhombifer	Non-venomous	
Eastern garter snake	Thamnophis sirtalis sirtalis	Non-venomous	
Eastern hognose snake	Heterodon platirhinos	Venomous	
Eastern ribbon snake	Thamnophis saurita saurita	Non-venomous	
Gray ratsnake	Pantherophis spiloides	Non-venomous	
Kirtland's snake	Clonophis kirtlandii	Non-venomous	
Eastern milksnake	Lampropeltis triangulum	Non-venomous	
Mississippi green watersnake	Nerodia cyclopion	Non-venomous	
North American racer	Coluber constrictor	Non-venomous	
Northern pine snake	Pituophis melanoleucus melanoleucus	Non-venomous	
Northern redbelly snake	Storeria occipitomaculata occipitomaculata	Non-venomous	
Prairie kingsnake	Lampropeltis calligaster	Non-venomous	
Queensnake	Regina septemvittata	Non-venomous	
Ringneck snake	Diadophis punctatus	Non-venomous	
Rough green snake	Opheodrys aestivus	Non-venomous	
Scarlet kingsnake	Lampropeltis elapsoides	Non-venomous	
Scarlet snake	Cemophora coccinea	Non-venomous	
Smooth earth snake	Virginia valeriae	Non-venomous	
Southeastern crowned snake	Tantilla coronata	Non-venomous	
Western mud snake	Farancia abacura reinwardtii	Non-venomous	
Western ribbon snake	Thamnophis proximus	Non-venomous	
Worm snake	Carphophis amoenus	Non-venomous	

== See also ==
- List of snakes by common name
- List of snakes by scientific name
- Snakebite
- Epidemiology of snakebites
- List of fatal snake bites in the United States
- Snake handling in Christianity
