= List of snakes of Connecticut =

Connecticut is home to 14 species of snakes and only two are venomous. In the state of the Connecticut, the timber rattlesnake is listed as endangered and the gray rat snake, eastern ribbonsnake and eastern hog-nosed snake are listed as species of special concern.

== Snakes ==
Scientific name	Common name(s)	Image	Notes
Coluber constrictor constrictor	Northern black racer	As listed	
Agkistrodon contortrix mokasen	Northern copperhead	As listed	Venomous
Storeria dekayi dekayi	Northern brown snake / Dekay's brown snake	As listed	
Pantherophis alleghaniensis	Gray rat snake	As listed	
Thamnophis sirtalis sirtalis	Eastern Garter Snake	As listed	
Heterodon platirhinos	Eastern hognose Snake	As listed	
Lampropeltis triangulum triangulum	Eastern milksnake	As listed	
Nerodia sipedon sipedon	Northern water snake	As listed	
Storeria occipitomaculata occipitomaculata	Northern redbelly Snake	As listed	
Thamnophis saurita saurita	Eastern ribbonsnake	As listed	
Diadophis punctatus edwardsii	Northern ringneck Snake	As listed	
Opheodrys vernalis	Smooth green snake	As listed	
Crotalus horridus	Timber rattlesnake / canebrake rattlesnake	As listed	Venomous
Carphophis amoenus amoenus	Eastern worm snake	As listed	
