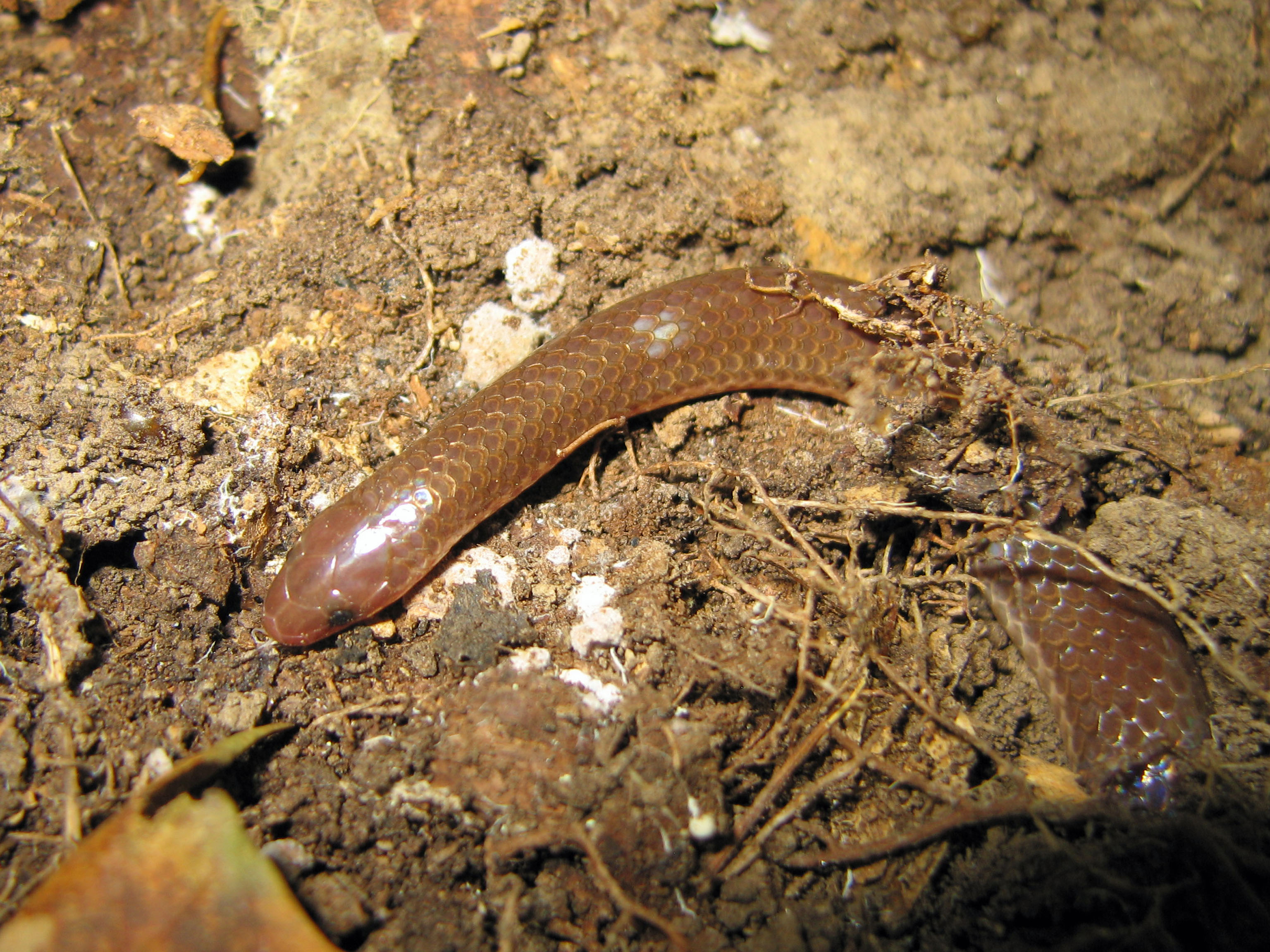

Conservation status
- Least Concern (IUCN 3.1)

Scientific classification
- Kingdom: Animalia
- Phylum: Chordata
- Class: Reptilia
- Order: Squamata
- Suborder: Serpentes
- Family: Colubridae
- Genus: Carphophis
- Species: C. amoenus

Binomial name
- Carphophis amoenus (Say, 1825)
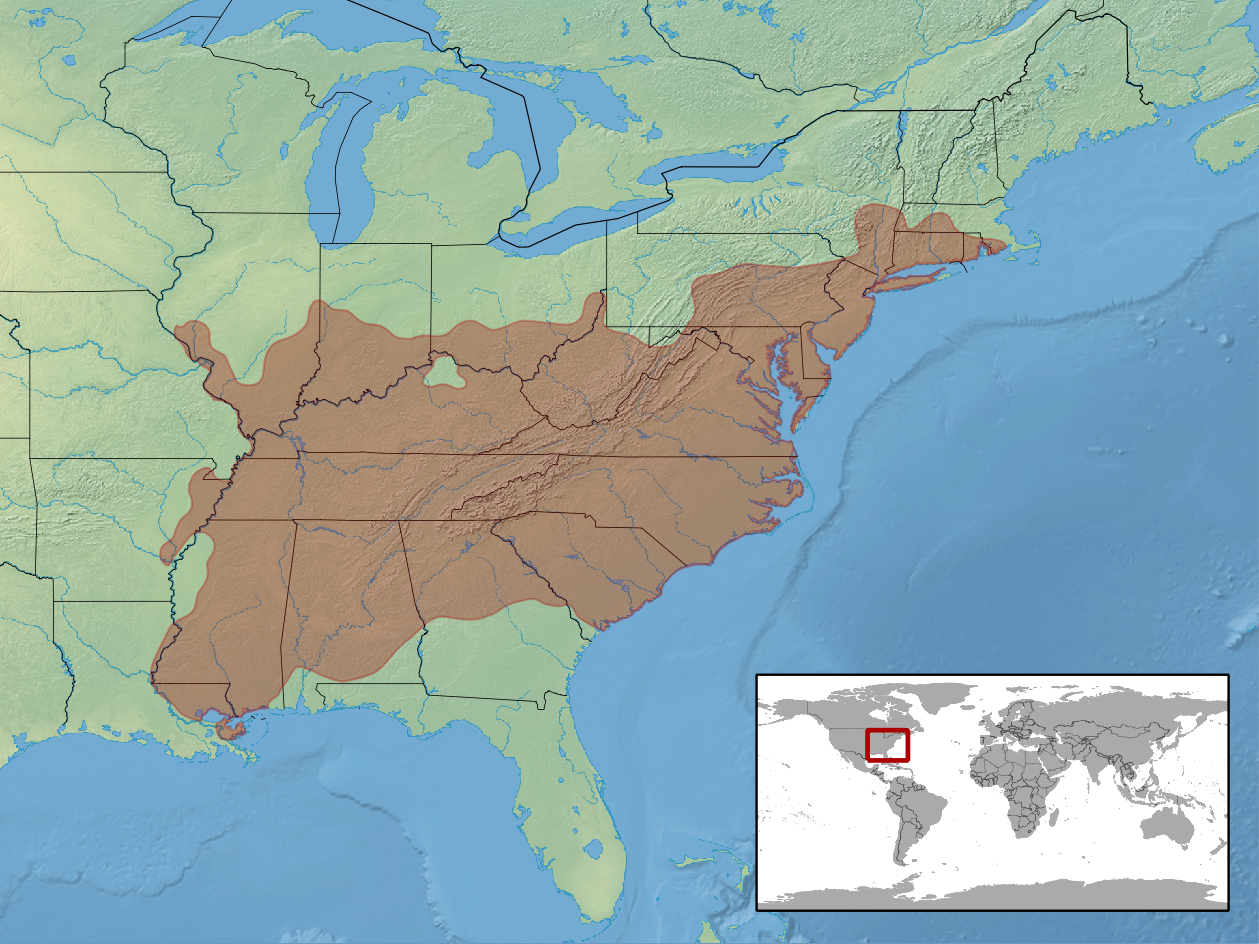

Synonyms
- Coluber amœnus Say, 1825; Calamaria amoena — Schlegel, 1837; Brachyorrhos amoenus — Holbrook, 1842; Celuta amoena — Baird & Girard, 1853; Carphophis amoena — Gervais, 1843; Carphophis amœnus — Boulenger, 1894; Carphopiops amoenus — Cope, 1900; Carphophis amoena — Stejneger & T. Barbour, 1917; Carphophis amoenus — A.H. Wright & A.A. Wright, 1957

= Carphophis amoenus =

Species of snake

Carphophis amoenus, commonly known as the worm snake, is a species of nonvenomous colubrid snake endemic to the eastern United States. C. amoenus can be found east of the Mississippi, from southwest Massachusetts south to southern Alabama west to Louisiana and then north to Illinois. This species of snake protects a large range, and normally prefers a moist habitat in the rocky woodlands, under rotten wood of logs and stumps. Though this snake is quite abundant over its range, it is rarely seen because of its dormant lifestyle and where it usually resides. This snake is most common on the edges or in the ecotonal areas of open to thick woodlands, and the borders of wetlands. It may also be found in the grasslands next to woodlands. The best chance to spot it is after heavy rains, when its small size and distinct color make it easy to spot. This species prefers moist soil inhabited by earthworms, which are its main prey, so the soil needs to be sufficiently moist. The snake's skin naturally evaporates water; so the soil needs to be moist enough to offset this. C. amoenus is mostly found under rocks and in sufficient leaf litter during the extreme daytime heat. Peak activity falls between 15:00 to 18:00.

== Description ==
The worm snake is a small snake. Adults are 19–28 cm (7.5–11.0 in) in total length, record 34 cm (13 in) . It is brown dorsally, and bright pink ventrally, with the belly color including one or two dorsal scale rows. The dorsal scales are smooth, in 13 rows. It has five upper labials and one postocular. C. amoenus coloration is unpatterned and can be tan to dark brown in color; it has a pointed head, and small, black eyes. It has pinkish ventral pigmentation which extends dorsally onto dorsal scale rows one to two. The tail is short in comparison with its body and ends in an abrupt, spine-like scale. Females are longer than males, but have shorter tails. The head is small, conical and no wider than the neck. Other small, unpatterned brownish snakes, such as earth snakes (genus Virginia) and red-bellied snakes (Storeria occipitomaculata), have keeled body scales and lack the spine-tipped tail. Other ways to distinguish between C. amoenus and other species are that the body scales usually occur in 13 rows and are smooth and pitless, and the anal plate is split. Another snake commonly confused with C. amoenus is the western worm snake (Carphophis vermis), which used to be considered a subspecies of C. amoenus, and has the slight ventral pigmentation extending onto the third body scale row, and a dark gray or gray-violet dorsum. The southeastern crowned snake (Tantilla coronata) has 15 midbody scale rows, a dark head, and a dark collar.

== Etymology ==
The specific name, amoenus, is Latin for "pleasing, charming" in reference to the snake's temperament. The generic name, Carphophis, translates to "straw snake"

== General description and taxonomy ==
Two subspecies of Carphophis amoenus are recognized:

- Carphophis amoenus amoenus — eastern worm snake
- Carphophis amoenus helenae — midwestern worm snake.

C. a. amoenus is found from Rhode Island, southwestern Massachusetts, and southeastern New York south to South Carolina, northern Georgia, and central Alabama. It has separate internasal and prefrontal scales. No gular scales occur between the posterior chin shields. Each maxilla has 9–12 small teeth. The single hemipenis has a forked sulcus spermaticus and three large basal spines. Adult males have ridges on the body scales that are dorsal to the anal plate. The young of this species are always much darker than the parent; then during the second year they change from a dark gray to the brown of the adult specimen. C. a. amoenus is almost exclusively an earthworm predator, but has also been known to consume other prey, from slugs to small salamanders. Due to human activities, C. a. amoenus is becoming rare in some areas. It is currently protected as threatened in Massachusetts and as a species of special concern in Rhode Island.

== Geographic range ==
It is found in southern Connecticut, southwestern Massachusetts, southeastern New York, New Jersey, southeastern Pennsylvania, Delaware, Maryland, Virginia, eastern West Virginia, North Carolina, South Carolina, northern Georgia and Alabama, In Mississippi, it is common only in the northeastern part of the state and in the northern and eastern parts of the Short-Leaf Pine Belt. in the Appalachian Mountains of Kentucky and Tennessee.

== Ecology ==
The worm snake is a burrower, and is seldom seen. Its annual activity period varies with latitude and elevation. Some have found them active in every month but February on the coastal plain of South Carolina. Farther north, the worm snake is active from March–April to October- November. Few are active above ground in the summer, but a second, lesser period of activity occurs in the fall. To escape overheating or desiccation, it has adopted a fossorial lifestyle and it usually spends most of the year underground or in rotting logs. They are normally found in forests with high leaf litter and canopy cover. They generally remain inactive during extreme temperatures. However, most of their surface activity is positively correlated with very high temperatures. They burrow by working their small, pointed heads into cracks and crevices. Activity periods begin mainly in the late afternoon and early evenings and rarely last more than 12 hours. C. amoenus amoenus does not move much but has been seen traveling 45 m in a 24-hour period. Males travel much farther than females and their diets consist primarily of earthworms, but may also include other soft-bodied invertebrates, such as insect larvae.

Predators include other snakes, thrushes, American robins, barn owls, and opossums. Occasionally, road traffic kills C. amoenus amoenus, and flooding of the lowlands and other natural disasters have been known to affect the population. Some die as a result of human habitat destruction, and insecticide poisoning occasionally kills the snake. Worm snakes release a foul-smelling liquid from their vents when handled, but they are completely harmless to humans and rarely even attempt to bite. C. a. amoenus is very shy and mild-mannered. The normal behavior of the snake when handled is to twist, then try to crawl between the fingers, probe the hand with its tail spine, and emit the strong-smelling liquid.

== Reproduction ==
Courtship and mating probably occur in the spring; the sexes are most often found together between late April and June. Then, the developing eggs can be seen through the translucent venter of the female in late May and June. Oviposition takes place between early June and mid-July, 5 June to 15 July in northern Virginia. Eggs are laid in late June or early July, two to eight per clutch. The eggs are smooth and elongated, 16–25 mm (0.63–0.98 in) long by 7–8 mm (0.28–0.31 in) wide. Often, one end of an egg is wider than the other. Hatching occurs in August or early September. Hatchlings are about 100 mm (3.9 in) in total length. They are darker than adults. The clutches of eggs are found in depressions under rocks, in cavities in the rotting wood of logs and stumps, and in old sawdust piles; and rodent burrows are probably also used for nesting. A female was nearby or with the eggs in 75% of the cases.

== Populations ==
Worm snakes may occur in large numbers where the habitat is ideal. C. Ernst and his students collected 108 individuals from beneath rocks and debris in 100 m along a hillside overlooking the Kentucky River in one hour on an April afternoon. It is the most common snake in northern Virginia, and one site had densities over 200/ha. The 1.88:1.00 sex ratio of a juvenile population in South Carolina significantly favored males (64) over females (34), though the ratio of adults caught in northern Virginia was not significantly different from 1:1.

Studies had suggested that worm snakes were absent or scarce in the coastal plains of South Carolina, but it was found that many isolated wetlands were overlooked due to worm snake not depending upon them like other aquatic herpetofauna may. This area provides habitats to the species in area that is mainly xeric sandhills for a total of 129 individuals.
