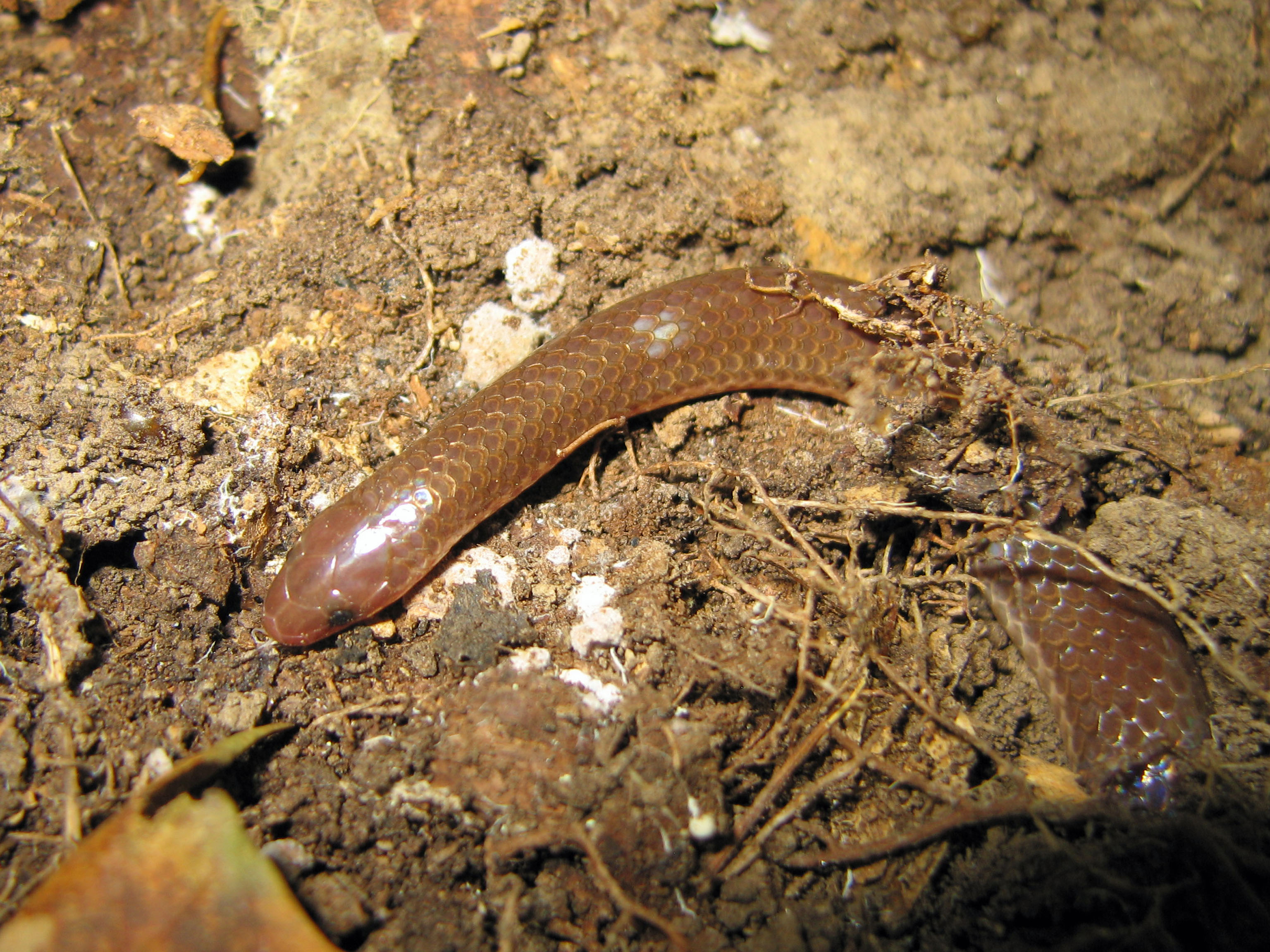

Scientific classification
- Kingdom: Animalia
- Phylum: Chordata
- Class: Reptilia
- Order: Squamata
- Suborder: Serpentes
- Family: Colubridae
- Genus: Carphophis
- Species: C. amoenus
- Subspecies: C. a. amoenus

Trinomial name
- Carphophis amoenus amoenus (Say, 1825)

Synonyms
- Coluber amœnus Say, 1825; Calamaria amoena — Schlegel, 1837; Brachyorrhos amoenus — Holbrook, 1842; Celuta amoena — Baird & Girard, 1853; Carphophis amoena — Gervais, 1843; Carphophis amœnus — Boulenger, 1894; Carphopiops amoenus — Cope, 1900; Carphophis amoena amoena — Schmidt & Davis, 1941; Carphophis amoenus amoenus — Wright & Wright, 1957

= Eastern worm snake =

Subspecies of snake

The eastern worm snake (Carphophis amoenus amoenus) is a subspecies of the worm snake, Carphophis amoenus, a nonvenomous colubrid endemic to the Eastern Woodlands region of North America. The species' range extends from southwest Massachusetts, south to southern Alabama, west to Louisiana and north to Illinois. This species is common in the ecotone between woodlands and wetlands. It may also be found in grasslands adjacent to woodlands. Though this snake can be abundant in parts of its range, it is rarely seen because of its fossorial lifestyle. When not underground, C. a. amoenus resides mostly under rocks, logs and leaf litter, or burrowed within rotting woody debris. This snake is perfectly safe to pick up, as it cannot bite, but may produce a foul-smelling excretion.

== Description ==
C. amoenus is a small snake. Adults are 19–28 cm (7.5–11.0 in) in total length, with a record length of 34 cm (13 in). The 13 rows of dorsal scales are smooth and glossy. It has five upper labials and one postocular scale. C. amoenus is unpatterned and can be either brown or dark brown with a reddish to pale pink belly. It has pinkish ventral pigmentation which extends onto dorsal scale rows one to two. The tail is short in comparison with its body and ends in a spine-like scale. This spine is not sharp enough to pierce skin. Females are longer than males, but have shorter tails. The head is small, conical and no wider than the neck, and is used to burrow, which aids in their fossorial lifestyle. The eyes are reduced and black. This snake can live up to 4 years in the wild.

C. amoenus can be distinguished from the western worm snake (Carphophis vermis), by its less vibrant dorsal and ventral coloration and lack of ventral pigmentation on the third body scale row. Other small, unpatterned brownish snakes which may be confused with C. amoenus, such as earth snakes (genus Virginia) and red-bellied snakes (Storeria occipitomaculata), have keeled dorsal scales and lack the spine-tipped tail. The southeastern crown snake (Tantilla coronata) has 15 midbody scale rows, a dark head, and a dark collar. The worm snake diet is mostly carnivorous, feeding on, in some areas, strictly earthworms and in others opportunistically eating slugs and other creatures that they can fit into their mouths.

The eastern worm snake has two prefrontal/internasal scales at the front of its head that are separated, unlike the midwestern worm snake (C. amoenus helenae) whose scales are fused together.

== General description and taxonomy ==
There are two subspecies of Carphophis amoenus: Carphophis amoenus amoenus and Carphophis amoenus helenae. Carphophis amoenus amoenus, the eastern worm snake, is found from Rhode Island, southwestern Massachusetts, and southeastern New York south to South Carolina, northern Georgia, and central Alabama. The two subspecies can be distinguished by the internasal and prefrontal scales, which are unfused in C. a. amoenus and fused in C. a. helanae. No gular scales occur between the posterior chin shields. Each maxilla has 9–12 small teeth. The single hemipenis has a forked sulcus spermaticus and three large basal spines. Juveniles are darker than adults, with the dorsum changing from dark brown to tan, and the venter from dark pink to pale pink as individuals become larger. The first major phylogenetic split within this species is the result of the oldest inferred lineage for this species and forms an Appalachian clade.

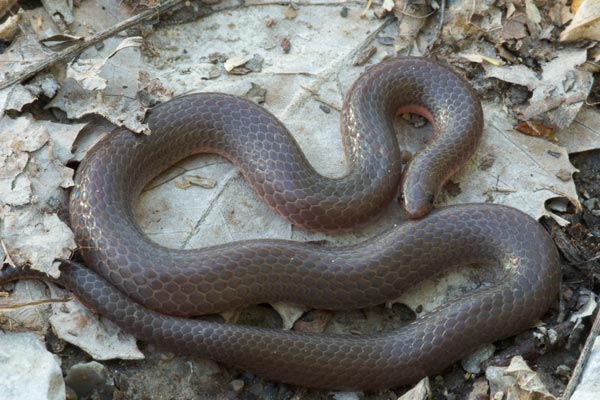

== Geographic range ==
It is found in southern Arizona, southern Connecticut, southwestern Massachusetts, southeastern New York, New Jersey, southeastern Pennsylvania, Delaware, Maryland, Virginia, eastern West Virginia, North Carolina, South Carolina, northern Georgia and Alabama, and in the Appalachian Mountains of Kentucky and Tennessee. It is currently protected as threatened in Massachusetts and as a species of special concern in Rhode Island. Populations are very scarce in the coastal plain in upland habitats that are more xeric and dominated by pines. In a study eastern worm snakes showed no homing ability, and on average did not travel more than 125 meters throughout its home range. Most movements were initiated in late afternoon and early evening. Most periods of activity were of less than 12 hour duration. Fossil records indicate a previous population of C. a. amoenus in central Florida that has been extirpated since the 19th century.

== Ecology ==
The eastern worm snake is a burrower, and is seldom seen. The annual activity period of the worm snake varies with latitude and elevation. Some have found them active in every month but February on the coastal plain of South Carolina. Farther north C. amoenus amoenus is active from March–April to October–November. Few are active above ground in the summer, but a second, lesser period of activity occurs in the fall. A study done from May to October in 1966 found that the worm snakes have no homing capabilities. This means they do not have a home range, and were not observed moving more than 5 feet at any given time. To escape overheating or desiccation, it has adopted a fossorial lifestyle and it usually spends most of the year underground or in rotting logs. They are normally found in forests with high leaf litter and canopy cover. They are found more often in upland mesic forests that are dominated by hardwood trees. The eastern wormsnake prefers well-drained, sandy soils for burrowing. It is typically found in moist habitats, usually in or near deciduous woodlands and occasionally in gardens. They can also be found in isolated wetlands in more xeric regions. They generally remain inactive during extreme temperatures. They burrow by working their small, pointed heads into cracks and crevices. Activity periods begin mainly in the late afternoon and early evenings and rarely last more than 12 hours. C. amoenus amoenus does not move much but has been seen traveling 45m in a 24‑hour period. They are typically found under cover items but are frequently found under the same cover consistently or within a few meters of it, giving them a relatively small home range. Males travel much farther than females and their diets consist primarily of earthworms, but may also include other soft-bodied invertebrates, such as insect larvae. They have been confirmed to consume things like beetles and spiders as well.

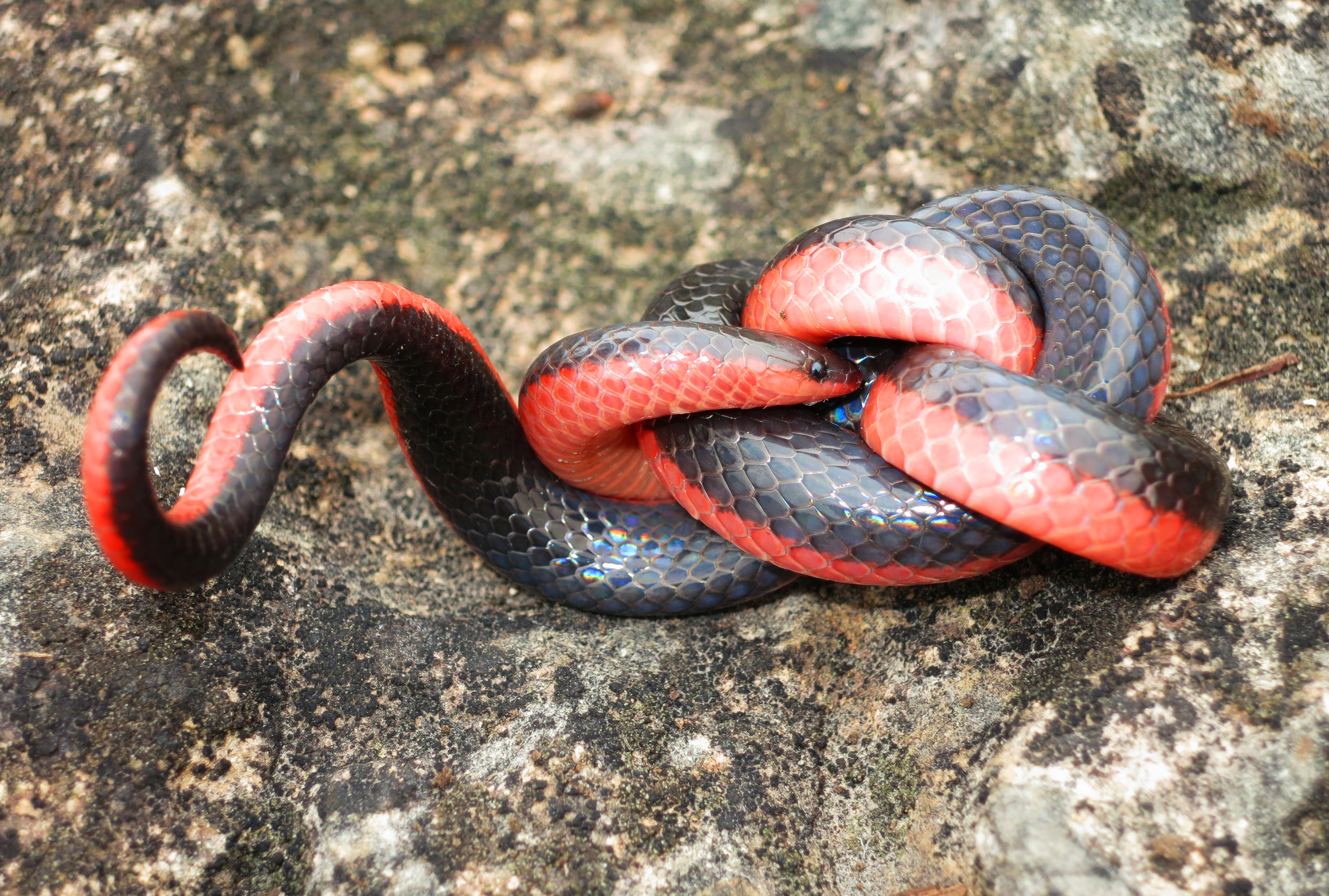

Predators include other snakes, thrushes, American robins, barn owls, and opossums. Occasionally, road traffic kills C. amoenus amoenus, and flooding of the lowlands and other natural disasters have been known to affect the population. Some die as a result of human habitat destruction and insecticide poisoning. When handled, C. amoenus may release a foul-smelling musk from their cloaca, defecate, attempt to burrow between the fingers, and probe the hand with the tail spine. However, they are completely harmless to humans and do not attempt to bite.

== Reproduction ==
Courtship and mating probably occur in the spring; the sexes are most often found together between late April and June. Higher activity during September and October indicate possible fall breeding in Western North Carolina. Gravid females are often found under rocks in the warmest parts of the day, possibly to increase embryonic development with the increased levels of heat. Then, the developing eggs can be seen through the translucent venter of the female in late May and June. Oviposition takes place between early June and mid-July, 5 June to 15 July in northern Virginia. Eggs are laid in late June or early July, two to eight per clutch. Clutches are placed in depressions under rocks, in cavities in the rotting wood of logs and stumps, and in old sawdust piles. A female was nearby or with the eggs in 75% of the cases. The eggs are smooth and elongated, 16–25 mm (0.63–0.98 in) long by 7–8 mm (0.28–0.31 in) wide. Often, one end of an egg is wider than the other. Hatching occurs in August or early September. Hatchlings are about 100 mm (3.9 in) in total length.

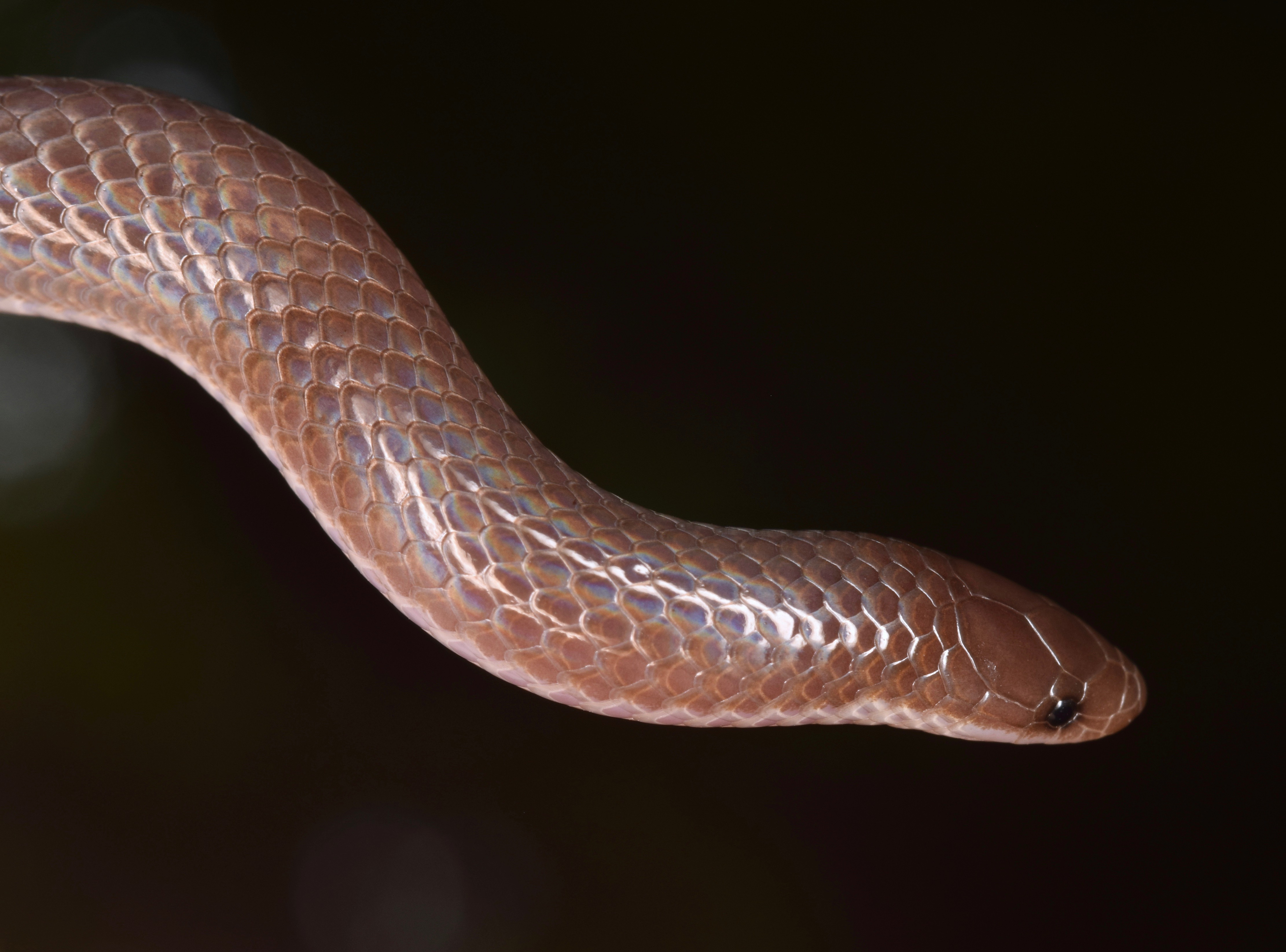

== Populations ==
C. a. amoenus may occur in large numbers where the habitat is ideal. Carl Ernst and his students collected 108 individuals from beneath rocks and debris in 100 m along a hillside overlooking the Kentucky River in one hour on an April afternoon. It is the most common snake in northern Virginia, and one site had densities over 200/ha. The 1.88:1.00 sex ratio of a juvenile population in South Carolina significantly favored males (64) over females (34), though the ratio of adults caught in northern Virginia was not significantly different from 1:1.The size of the home range to vary from 23 meters for a small juvenile or female to a maximum of 726 m^2 for an adult male.
