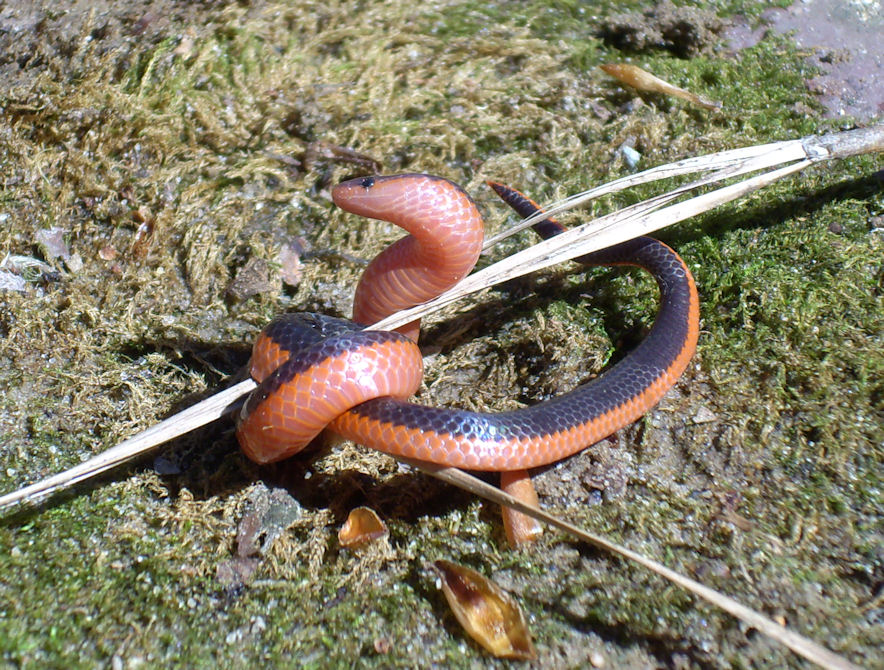
- Carphophis vermis

Scientific classification
- Kingdom: Animalia
- Phylum: Chordata
- Class: Reptilia
- Order: Squamata
- Suborder: Serpentes
- Family: Colubridae
- Subfamily: Dipsadinae
- Genus: Carphophis; Gervais, 1843
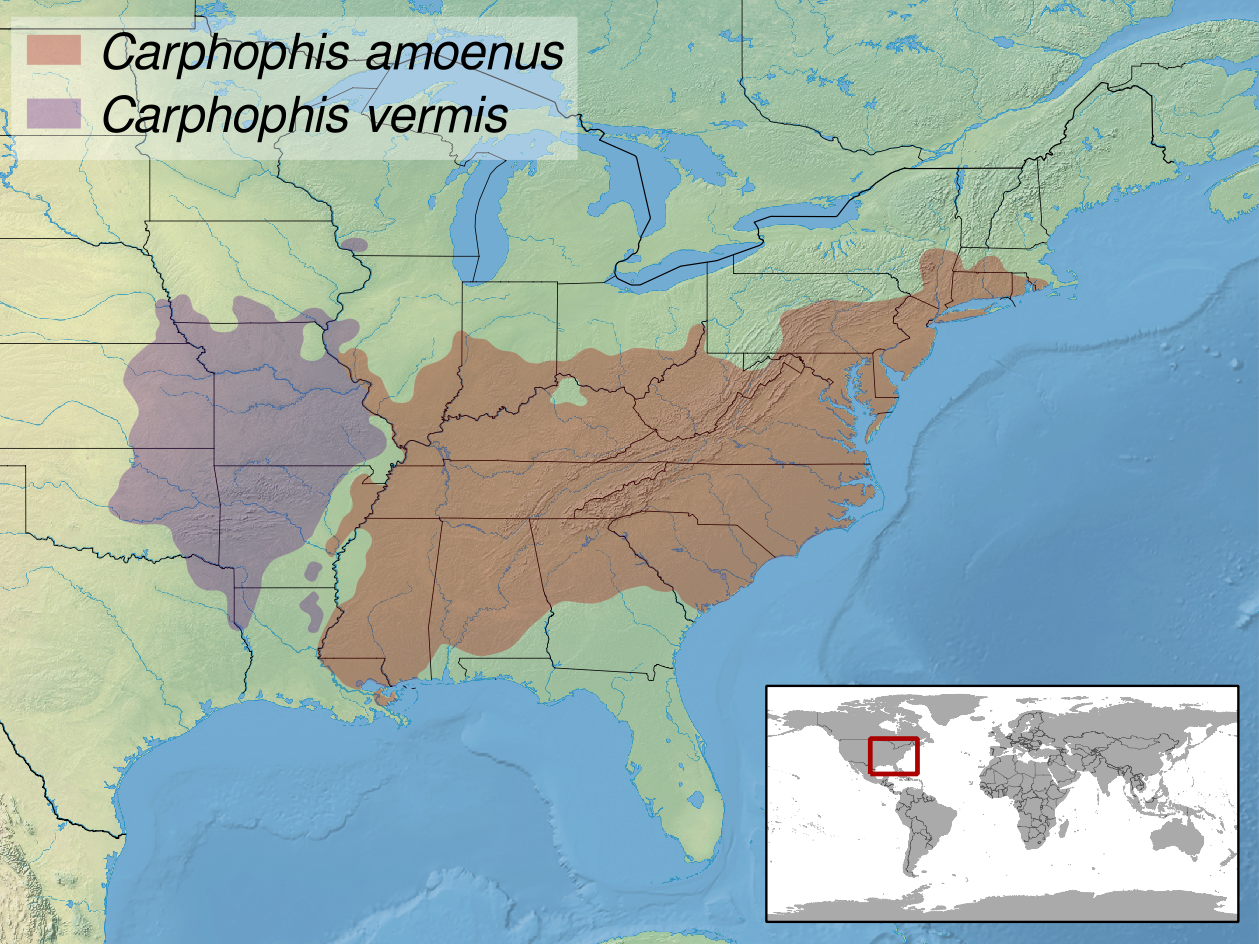

Synonyms
- Brachyorrhos, Calamaria, Carphophiops, Celuta, Coluber

= Carphophis =

Genus of snakes

Carphophis (common name worm snakes) is a genus of small colubrid snakes endemic to the United States. The genus consists of two species, one of which has two subspecies.

== Description ==
Worm snakes are small snakes, 35 cm (14 in) or less in total length (including tail). The males are shorter than the females. Both sexes are usually a dark brown in color on the upperside, with a lighter-colored, pink or orange underside. Both species are cylindrical and unpatterned, with a pointed head and small black eyes. They are easily mistaken for other similar species, such as the earth snakes (genus Virginia) and the brown snakes (genus Storeria). Worm snakes have narrow heads, sharp tail tips, and are not venomous.

== Behavior ==
Worm snakes are fossorial snakes, and spend the vast majority of their time buried in loose, rocky soil, or under forest leaf litter. They predominantly reside in cool, moist soils next to streams, hilly woodlands, pine forest stands, partially grassy woodsides, and farmland bordering woodlands. These species have fairly small home ranges (253 square meters) and the daily activity is from 3-6pm. It was seen that most periods of activity were for less than 12 hours, while the periods of inactivity can range from a few minutes to over two weeks. Worm snakes are abundant within their ranges, but rarely seen due to their secretive nature. Studies have shown that if these species are displaced, there is no homing ability that is exhibited.

== Reproduction ==
Little is known about the mating habits of worm snakes, but breeding likely occurs in early spring. The eggs are laid in early summer. Clutch size is normally two to five eggs, and hatching takes place in August or September. Hatchlings range in size from 7 to 12 cm (about 3-5 inches). The young can mature within three years.

== Diet ==
Worm snakes eat almost entirely earthworms, and other annelids. Studies have shown that they have consumed soft-bodied insects and other invertebrate prey.

== Predation ==
Worm snakes are a common food source for ophiophagous snake species, such as the coral snakes, Micrurus fulvius and Micrurus tener, in areas in which they are sympatric. They can also be threatened by opossums, shrews, and moles, as well as birds.

== Species and subspecies ==
- Carphophis amoenus (Say, 1825) – worm snake
  - Carphophis amoenus amoenus (Say, 1825) – eastern worm snake
  - Carphophis amoenus helenae (Kennicott, 1859) – midwestern worm snake
- Carphophis vermis (Kennicott, 1859) – western worm snake

Nota bene: A binomial authority or trinomial authority in parentheses indicates that the species or subspecies was originally described in a genus other than Carphophis.

== Geographic distribution ==
- C. amoenus - Arkansas, eastern Missouri, Louisiana, Mississippi, Alabama, northern Georgia, South Carolina, North Carolina, Tennessee, Virginia, West Virginia, Kentucky, southern Illinois, southern Indiana, southern Ohio, Delaware, New Jersey, Maryland, Pennsylvania, southeastern New York, and Connecticut
- C. vermis - southern Iowa, southeastern Nebraska, eastern Kansas, western Illinois, Missouri, Louisiana, eastern Oklahoma, and northeastern Texas with isolated records from southwestern Wisconsin, and southeastern Arkansas
