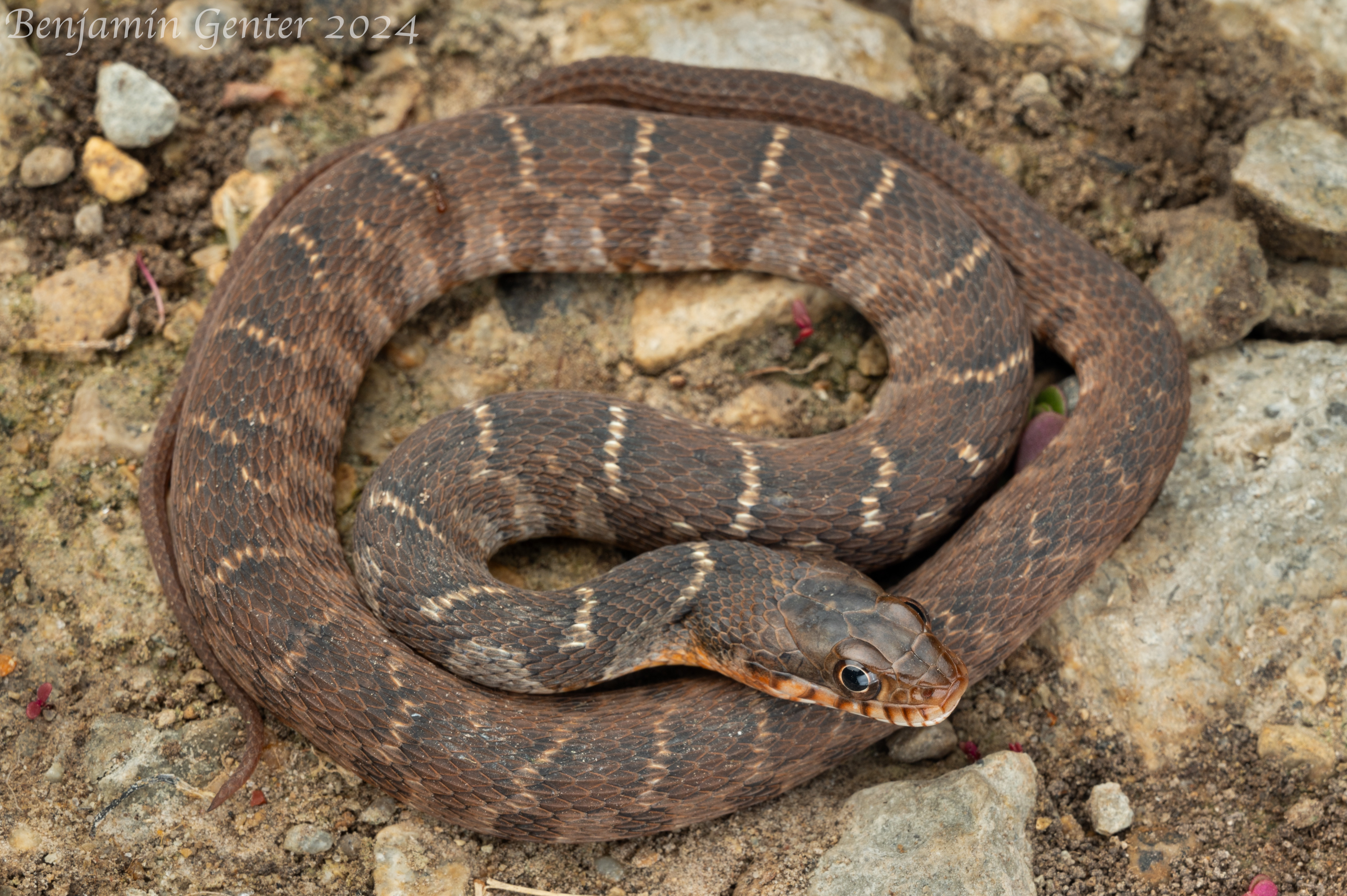

Conservation status
- Least Concern (IUCN 3.1)

- Secure (NatureServe)

Scientific classification
- Kingdom: Animalia
- Phylum: Chordata
- Class: Reptilia
- Order: Squamata
- Suborder: Serpentes
- Family: Colubridae
- Genus: Nerodia
- Species: N. erythrogaster

Binomial name
- Nerodia erythrogaster (Forster, 1771)
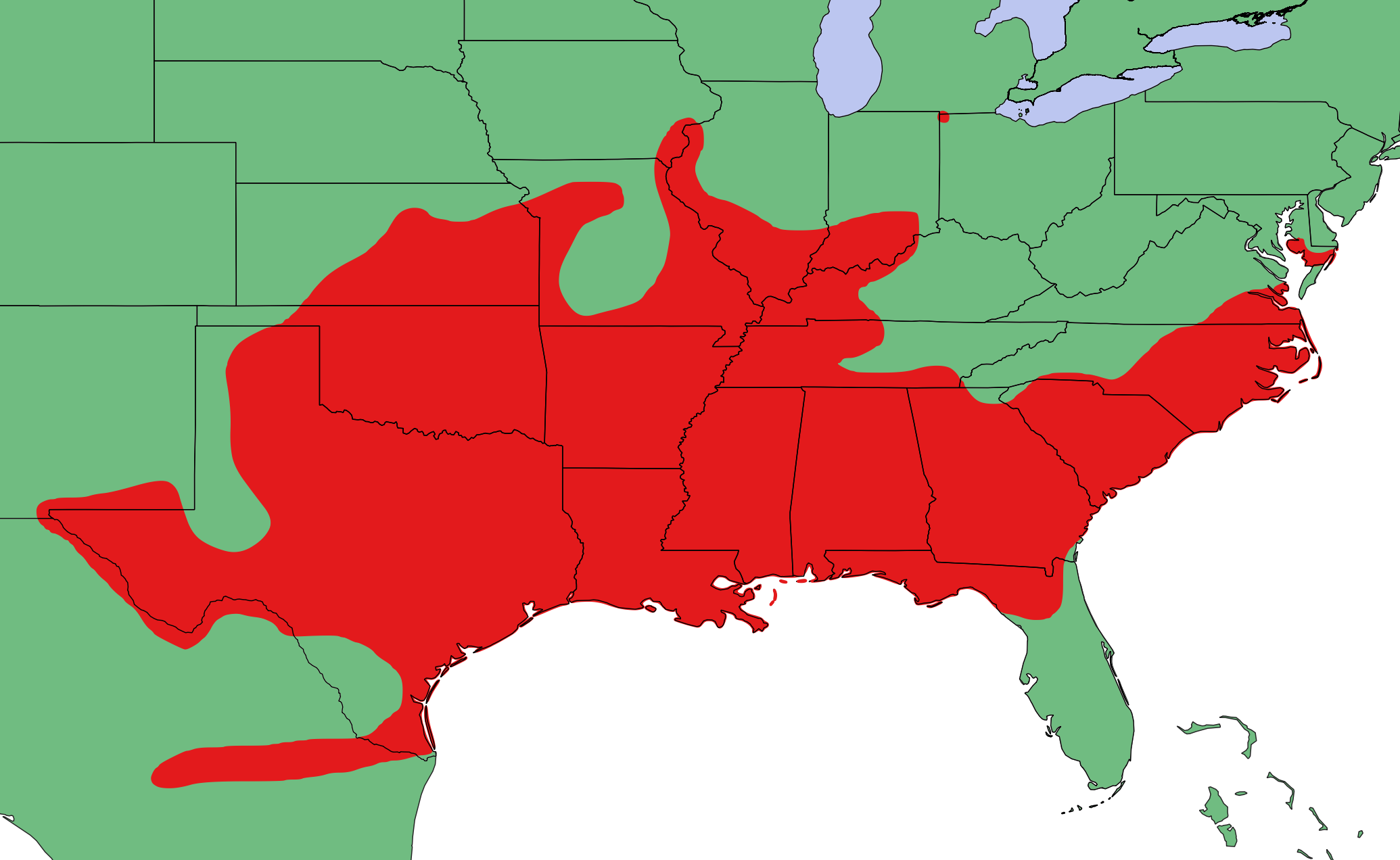

Synonyms
- Coluber erythrogaster Forster, 1771; Tropidonotus erythrogaster — Holbrook, 1842; Tropidonotus transversus Hallowell, 1852; Nerodia erythrogaster — Baird & Girard, 1853; Natrix fasciata erythrogaster — Cope, 1888; Natrix sipedon erythrogaster — Allen, 1932; Natrix erythrogaster — Clay, 1938; Natrix e. erythrogaster — Conant, 1958; Nerodia e. erythrogaster — Conant & Collins, 1991

= Nerodia erythrogaster =

Species of snake

Nerodia erythrogaster, also known as the plain-bellied water snake or plainbelly water snake, is a common species of semi-aquatic, non-venomous colubrid snake endemic to the United States.

== Description ==
The plain-bellied water snake is a large, thick-bodied, mostly patternless snake, with a generally beige underside. Some snakes display a thin, white line between the pale belly and their darker top scales. Subspecies can range from dark brown, gray, and olive-green to greenish-gray or blackish in color. Some lighter-colored individuals have dark dorsal patterns. Plain-bellied water snakes can be distinguished from other water snakes by their "plain", patternless undersides, which vary in color from light reddish hues to beige; this is where they get the common name "plain-bellied", as they typically have no notable markings on their bellies. There used to be recognized subspecies of the plain-bellied water snake, although scientists often had a hard time differentiating between them. This has led to these subspecies no longer being recognized.

The scientific name erythrogaster comes from the Greek word "erythros" (meaning 'red') and "gaster" (meaning 'belly'). This species exhibits geographically-distinct, phenotypic variations which result in a number of unique subspecies. Adults vary in size from 24 to 40 inches (76–122 cm) in total length. Juvenile snakes feature patterns similar to banded water snakes, but can be identified by their unmarked bellies.

== Distribution and habitat ==
Plain-bellied water snakes are found in every southeastern state of the U.S., except for the higher elevations in the Appalachian Mountains (thus excluding them from eastern Tennessee and western North Carolina). On the east coast, they are found across Florida, north to southeastern Virginia, as well as western Tennessee. They are found at lower elevations from Georgia and west across the Gulf States, extending as far west as Oklahoma and Texas. The snakes are almost always found near a permanent freshwater source, usually several feet deep, and not necessarily clear or fast-moving waters, either. They can often be observed resting on branches or foliage directly over the water, for an easy escape route. In their natural geographic range, the snakes are adapted to a wetland lifestyle, often found at or near creeks, rivers, swamps, floodplains, lakes, and ponds, as well as man-made reservoirs, dams, and canals.

== Behavior and diet ==
Plain-bellied water snakes are active in the warmest months of the year. During the hottest months of summer, they will be active both during the day and at night. In warmer months, they are typically found basking on logs or near bodies of water, swimming, or traveling over land. During hot, humid weather, they will travel long distances away from water. Nerodia erythrogaster is found no further than (approximately) 318 feet (97 m) away from a freshwater source, but do travel over dry land, around 98–108 feet (30–33 m) in a single day. Unfortunately, their migration leads to high mortality rates on roads, with mortality rates reaching up to sixty percent. They tend to spend more time in terrestrial habitats than other species of Nerodia. They hibernate during the coldest months of the winter.

The species finds the bulk of its prey in the water. They feed primarily on tadpoles, small amphibians, fish, crayfish and other crustaceans, aquatic insects (like water beetles), hatchling turtles and carrion. Because of the amount of time they spend on land, the snake's diet includes a large quantity of amphibians, consisting mostly of toads and frogs. Like most other snakes, it will actively hunt for prey, but this species has also been observed submerged underwater and lying in wait for prey to approach. They apprehend and swallow prey alive without the prior use of constriction or envenomation.

== Reproduction ==
This species bears live young (ovoviviparous) like other North American water snakes and garter snakes. The snake breeds from April until mid-June in the southeast U.S. The female gives birth during the months from August to September. A typical litter size consists of around eighteen young, but litters may exceed that size; one female was observed with a litter of fifty five hatchlings in North Carolina. In 2014, a captive female produced two healthy offspring via parthenogenesis.

== Predators and defense ==
The plain-bellied water snake is prey to both terrestrial and aquatic predators. Reported predators include largemouth bass, kingsnakes, cottonmouths, and several species of egrets and hawks. When they feel threatened, plain-bellied watersnakes may attempt to escape and/or respond with threat displays such as striking in the direction of the perceived threat or releasing a foul musk from its cloaca. Unlike the common watersnake, the plain-bellied watersnake will leave water and try to escape over land if threatened.

== Taxonomy ==
These six subspecies of N. erythrogaster have been historically recognized, including the nominotypical subspecies. However, in 2010, Makowsky, et al. determined that there was "little support for the recognized subspecies as either independent evolutionary lineages or geographically circumscribed units and conclude that although some genetic and niche differentiation has occurred, most populations assigned to N. erythrogaster appear to represent a single, widespread species."

- Nerodia erythrogaster alta (Conant, 1963) - plainbelly water snake
- Nerodia erythrogaster bogerti (Conant, 1953) - Bogert's water snake
- Nerodia erythrogaster erythrogaster (Forster, 1771) - redbelly water snake
- Nerodia erythrogaster flavigaster (Conant, 1949) - yellowbelly water snake
- Nerodia erythrogaster neglecta (Conant, 1949) - copperbelly water snake
- Nerodia erythrogaster transversa (Hallowell, 1852) - blotched water snake

== Conservation ==
The plain-bellied water snake is considered a conservation risk because of loss of wetlands and other anthropogenic factors. 35% of wetlands worldwide have been lost from 1970 to 2015. This species is often struck by vehicles while it crosses highways traveling from one water source to another. They are commonly mistaken for cottonmouths and are consequently killed by people averse to snakes. It is not a protected species in the southeastern states. In 1997, the copper-bellied water snake subspecies was designated a threatened species in Ohio, Michigan and northern Indiana under the Federal Endangered Species Act.
