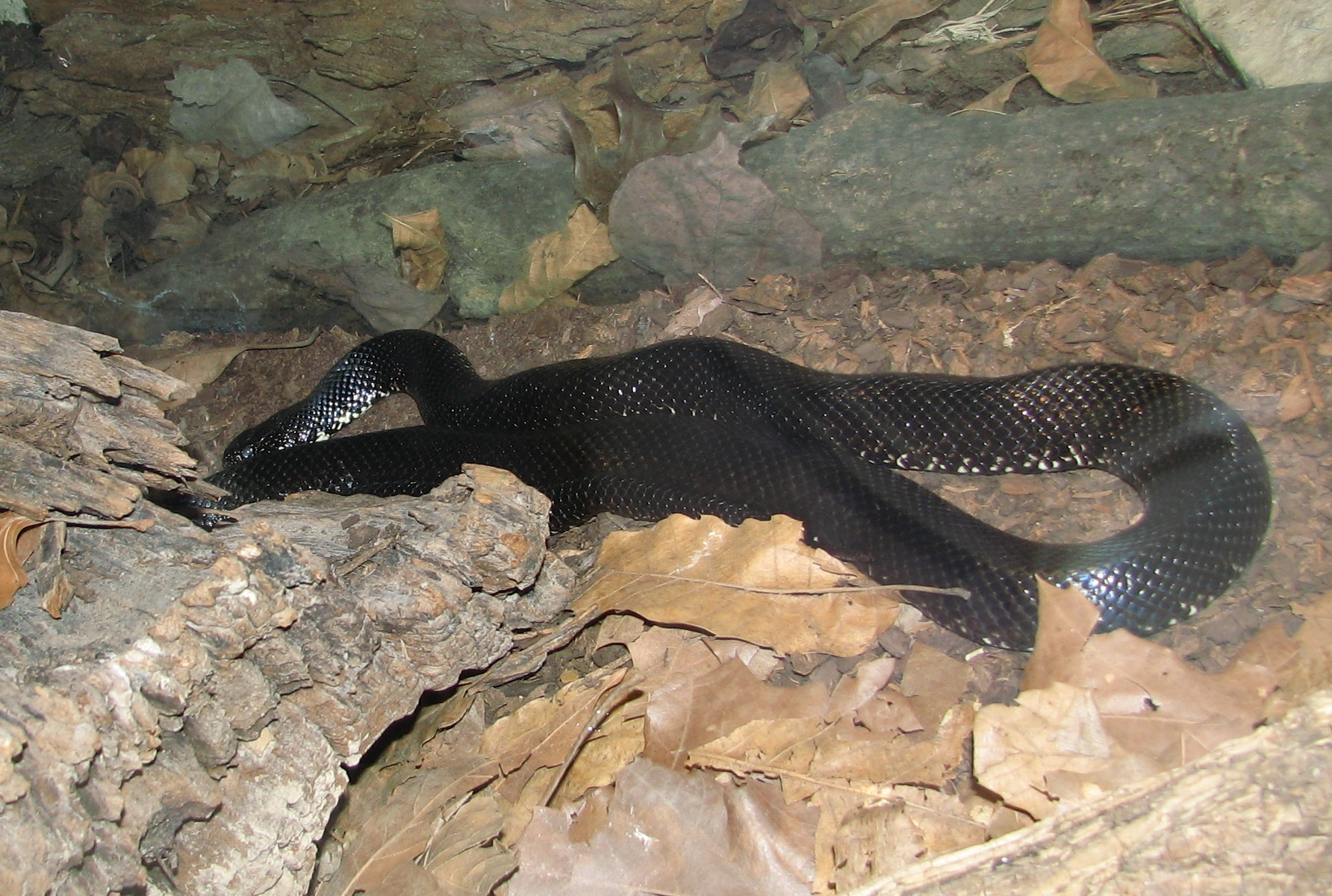
- A black kingsnake, Lampropeltis nigra, in captivity.

Conservation status
- Least Concern (IUCN 3.1)

Scientific classification
- Kingdom: Animalia
- Phylum: Chordata
- Class: Reptilia
- Order: Squamata
- Suborder: Serpentes
- Family: Colubridae
- Genus: Lampropeltis
- Species: L. nigra

Binomial name
- Lampropeltis nigra (Yarrow, 1882)
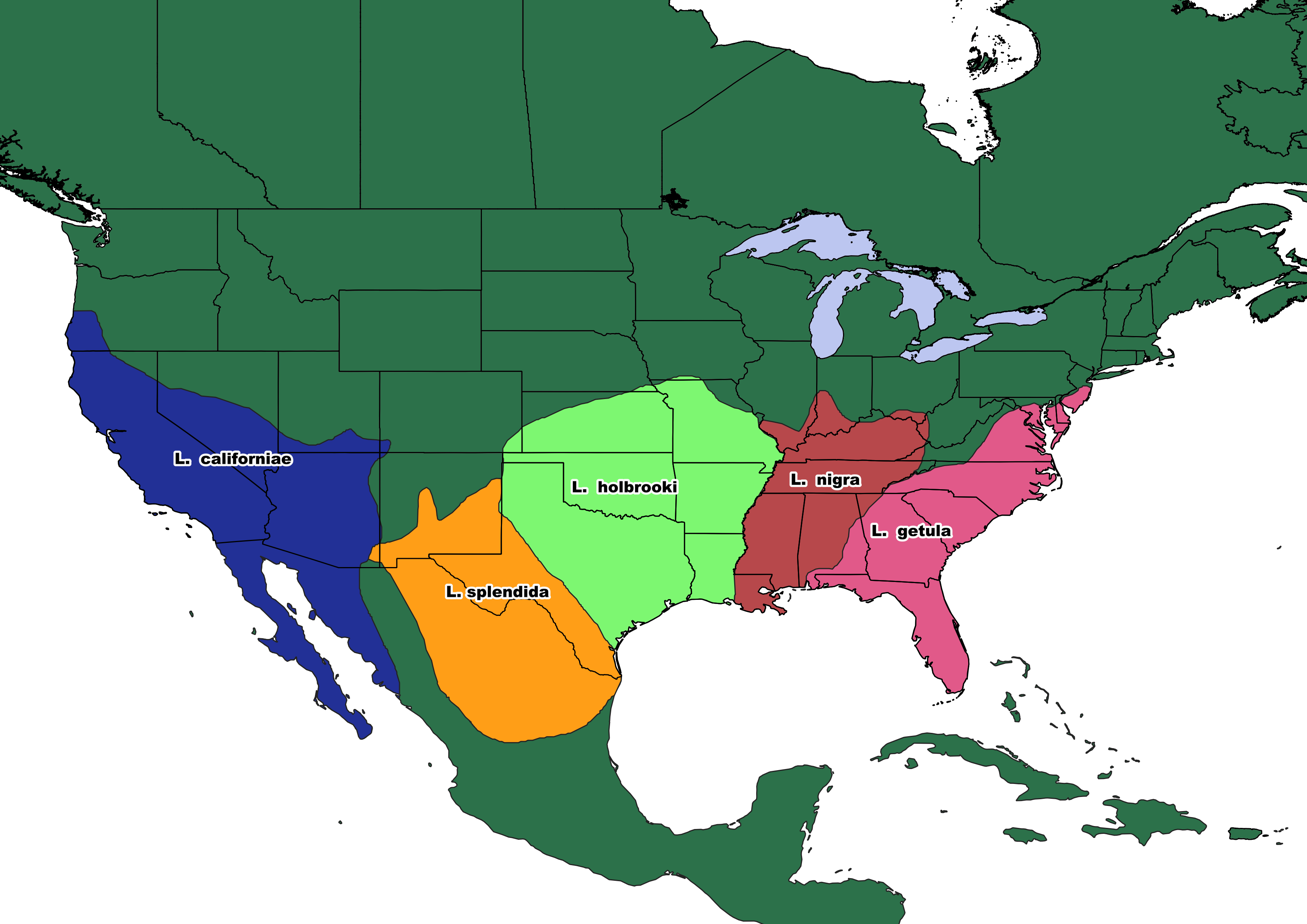

Synonyms
- Ophibolus getulus niger Yarrow, 1882; Lampropeltis getula nigra — Conant, 1938; Lampropeltis getulus niger — Seufer & Jauch, 1980; Lampropeltis getula niger — Crother, 2000; Lampropeltis nigra — Pyron & Burbrink, 2009

= Lampropeltis nigra =

Species of snake

Lampropeltis nigra, commonly known as the black kingsnake, is a species of nonvenomous colubrid snake indigenous to the United States. It is a species of kingsnake.

== Description ==
The black kingsnake is a large to medium constrictor. Adult specimens attain an average size of 90 to 122 centimetres (35 to 48 in) in total length, with some reaching maximum total lengths of 147 to 183 centimetres (58 to 72 in). It is generally similar to L. getula getula, although it can be distinguished by its geography and appearance. It has a black body that is interspersed with widely spaced yellow or cream-colored speckles, larger and more numerous along the sides. The dorsum in some is unpatterned and in others crossbanded. The venter displays a checked black and yellow (or cream) pattern. Ventral scales range from 197 to 222 in both sexes, with subcaudal scales ranging from 45 to 59 in males and 37 to 51 in females.

Black kingsnakes are also ophiophagous (snake-eating) and are immune to the venom of some snake species.

== Geographic range ==
The black kingsnake is found in the southeastern quarter of the United States, ranging from southern Illinois to Ohio, then down along the foothills of the Appalachian Mountains and the Alabama River watershed to the northern Gulf Coast in south Alabama and along the coast to the Mississippi River in Louisiana.

== Habitat ==
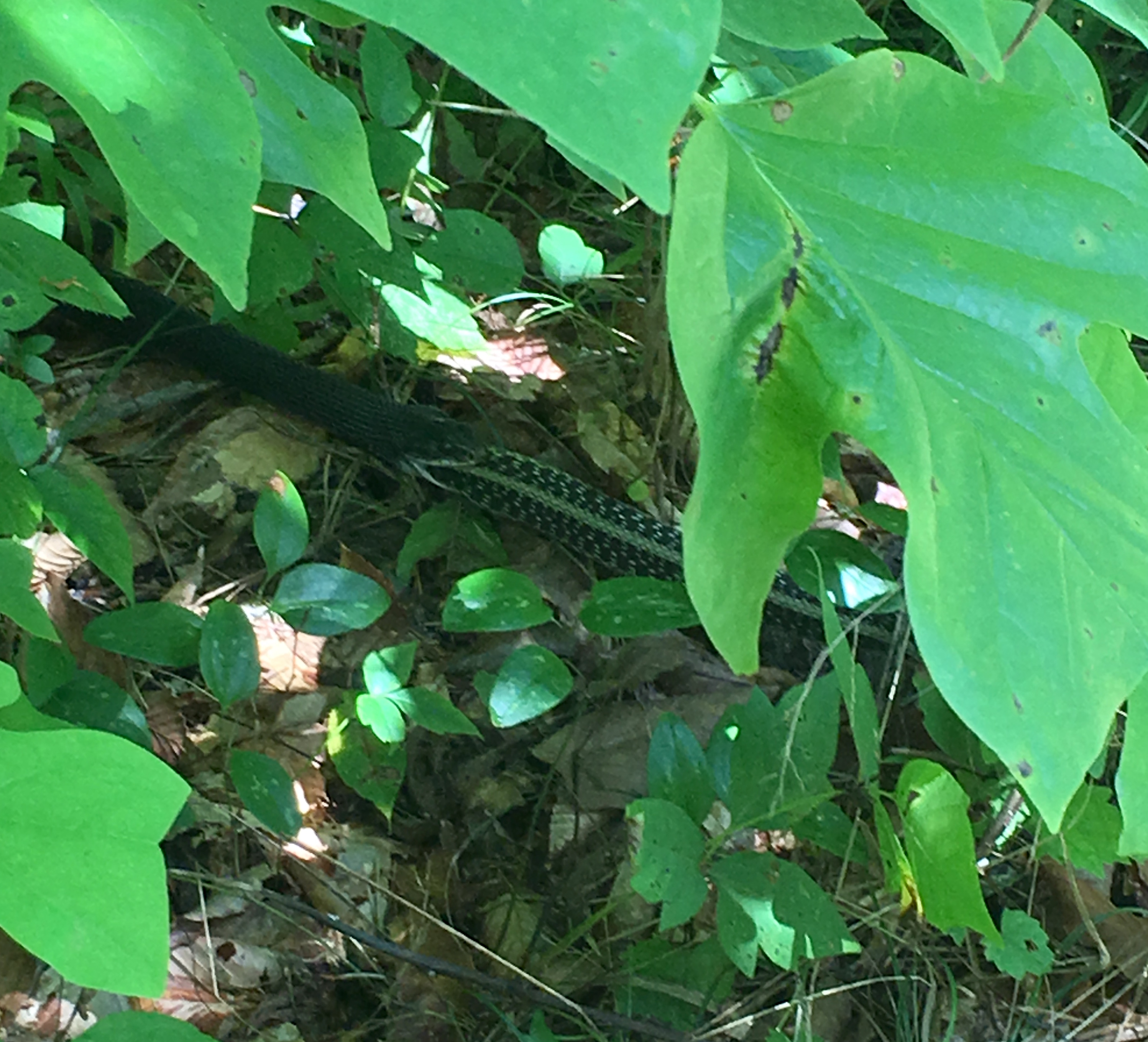
A black kingsnake consuming an Eastern Garter Snake

Black kingsnakes occupy a wide variety of habitats and are one of the most frequently encountered species by humans in some states. Preferred habitats include abandoned farmsteads, debris piles, edges of floodplains, and thick brush around streams and swamps.
