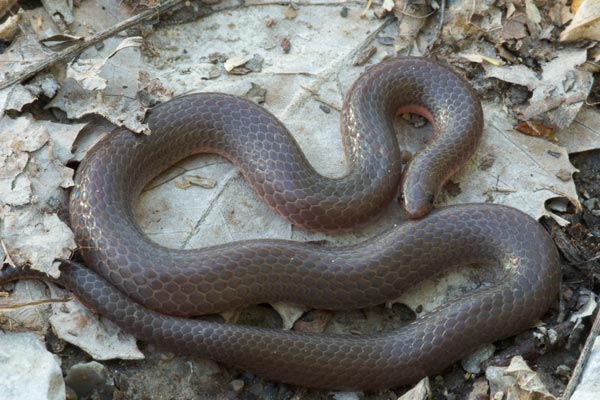

Conservation status
- Secure (NatureServe)

Scientific classification
- Kingdom: Animalia
- Phylum: Chordata
- Class: Reptilia
- Order: Squamata
- Suborder: Serpentes
- Family: Colubridae
- Genus: Carphophis
- Species: C. amoenus
- Subspecies: C. a. helenae

Trinomial name
- Carphophis amoenus helenae Kennicott, 1859

Synonyms
- Celuta helenae Kennicott, 1859; Carphophis amoena var. Helenae — Jan, 1865; Carphophis amoena helenae — Conant, 1938; Carphophis amoenus helenae — Conant & Collins, 1991

= Midwestern worm snake =

Subspecies of snake

The midwestern worm snake, Carphophis amoenus helenae, a subspecies of C. amoenus, is a nonvenomous snake in the family Colubridae. The subspecies is endemic to the Midwest and Southern United States.

== Etymology ==
The subspecific name, helenae, is in honor of "Miss Helen Tennison", a misspelling of the name of Robert Kennicott's cousin Helen L. Teunisson. Tenuisson collected specimens for and with Kennicott in Mississippi.

== Common names ==
Additional common names for C. a. helenae include central twig snake, central worm snake, ground snake, Helen's snake, Helen Tennison's snake, Helen's worm snake, red snake, and worm snake.

== Geographic range ==
The subspecies C. a. helenae ranges from southern Ohio to northern Georgia in the east and from southern Illinois to eastern Louisiana in the west.

== Description ==
When adult, C. a. helenae is small and wormlike, rarely growing longer than 9.8 in (25 cm) in total length (including tail). It is plain dark brown on top and light pink on its underside.

The scalation on the anterior dorsal surface of the head is distinctive. Instead of having a pair of internasals and a pair of prefrontals, as are found in most snakes including other subspecies of C. amoenus, the midwestern worm snake has each internasal fused with its corresponding prefrontal. As a result, in the space between the rostral and the frontal, C. a. helenae has two large head shields, one on the left and one on the right, instead of the usual four smaller shields.

== Behavior, diet, and habitat ==
The midwestern worm snake is fossorial. It spends its life burrowing in moist soil or under the leaf litter searching for soft-bodied prey, with a preference for earthworms. This secretive snake prefers mesic deciduous forest.
