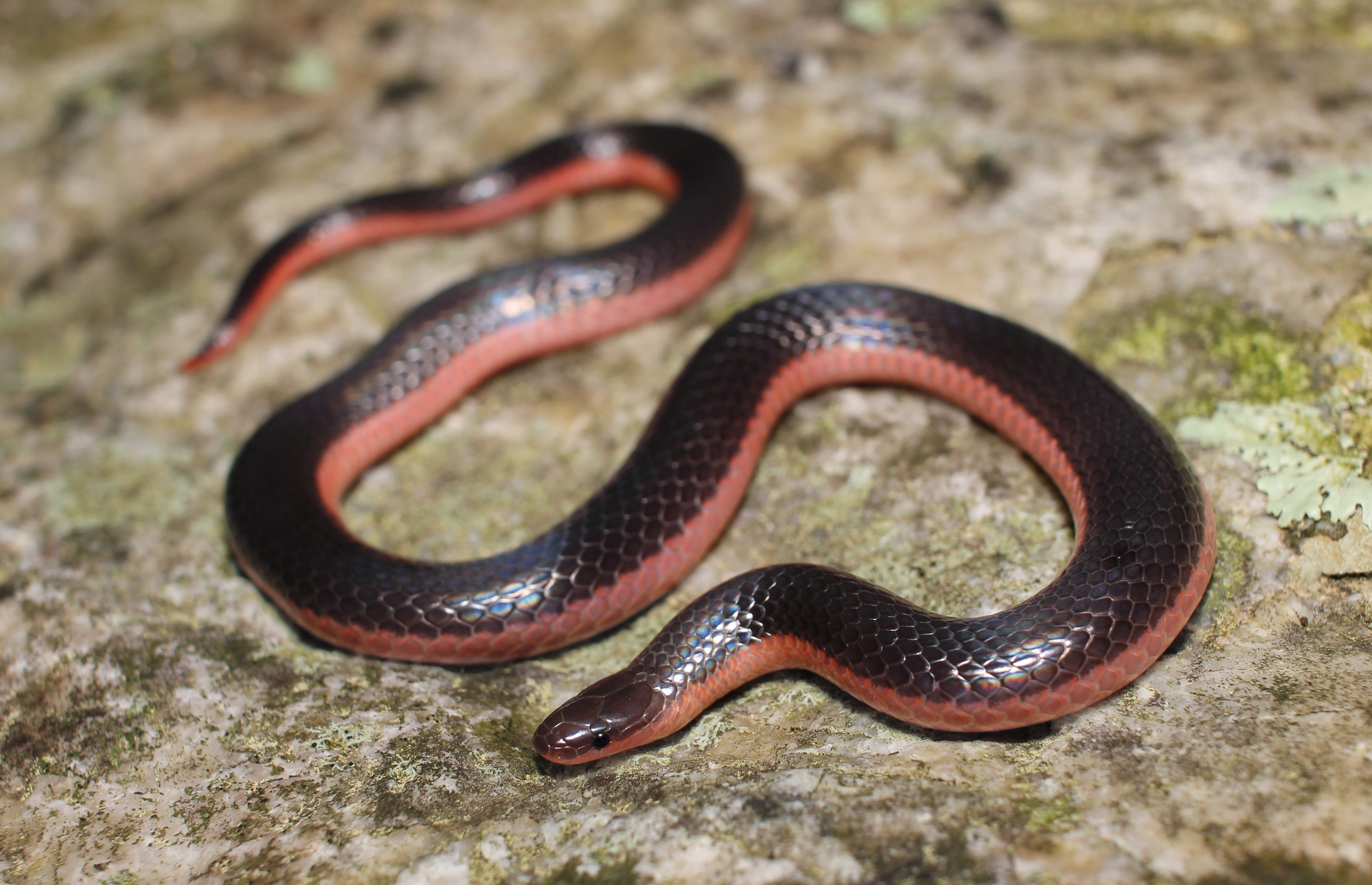
- Carphophis vermis in Arkansas, USA

Conservation status
- Least Concern (IUCN 3.1)

- Secure (NatureServe)

Scientific classification
- Kingdom: Animalia
- Phylum: Chordata
- Class: Reptilia
- Order: Squamata
- Suborder: Serpentes
- Family: Colubridae
- Genus: Carphophis
- Species: C. vermis

Binomial name
- Carphophis vermis (Kennicott, 1859)
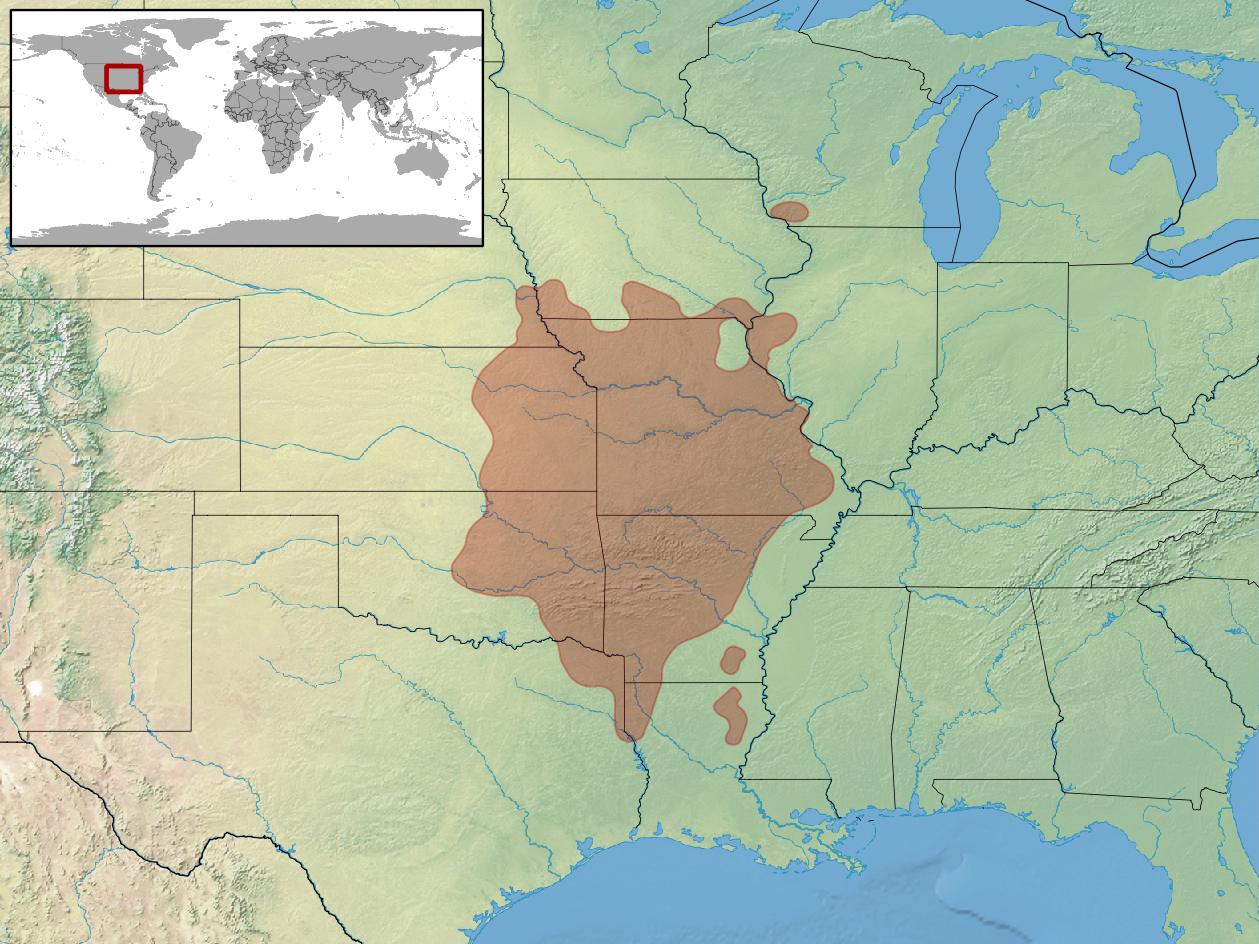

Synonyms
- Celuta vermis Kennicott, 1859; Carphophiops vermis — Cope, 1898; Carphophis vermis — Stejneger & T. Barbour, 1917; Carphophis amoena vermis — Conant & Bridges, 1939; Carphophis amoenus vermis — A.H. Wright & A.A. Wright, 1957; Carphophis vermis — Conant & Collins, 1991

= Carphophis vermis =

Western worm snake

Species of snake

Carphophis vermis (common name western worm snake) is a species of small, nonvenomous colubrid snake native to the United States.

== Etymology ==
The specific name, vermis, is Latin for "worm".

== Physical description ==
The western worm snake has a dark, black or purplish dorsal coloration, with a lighter, pink or reddish underside.

Adults are usually from 19–28 cm (7.5–11 in) in total length (including tail); however, the maximum recorded total length is 37.5 cm (14.8 in).

== Geographic range ==
The western worm snake is found in the United States in southern Iowa, southeastern Nebraska, eastern Kansas, western Illinois, Missouri, Louisiana, eastern Oklahoma, and northeastern Texas with isolated records from southwestern Wisconsin, southeastern Arkansas and western as well as middle Tennessee.

== Behavior ==
C. vermis is fossorial, and spends the vast majority of time buried in loose, rocky soil, or under damp forest leaf litter. It is abundant within its range, but rarely seen due to its secretive nature.

== Reproduction ==
Little is known about the mating habits of the western worm snake, but breeding likely occurs in the early spring. Eggs are laid in the early summer. Clutch size is normally 1-8 eggs, and hatching takes place in August or September. Hatchlings range in size from 3 to 4 inches (7.6 to 10.2 cm) in total length.

== Diet ==
The western worm snake's diet consists almost entirely of earthworms, but it will also consume soft-bodied insects.

== Defense ==
If harassed, C. vermis will often release foul smelling musk from its cloaca. If handled, it may press its tail tip into the captor's hand as a defense mechanism.
