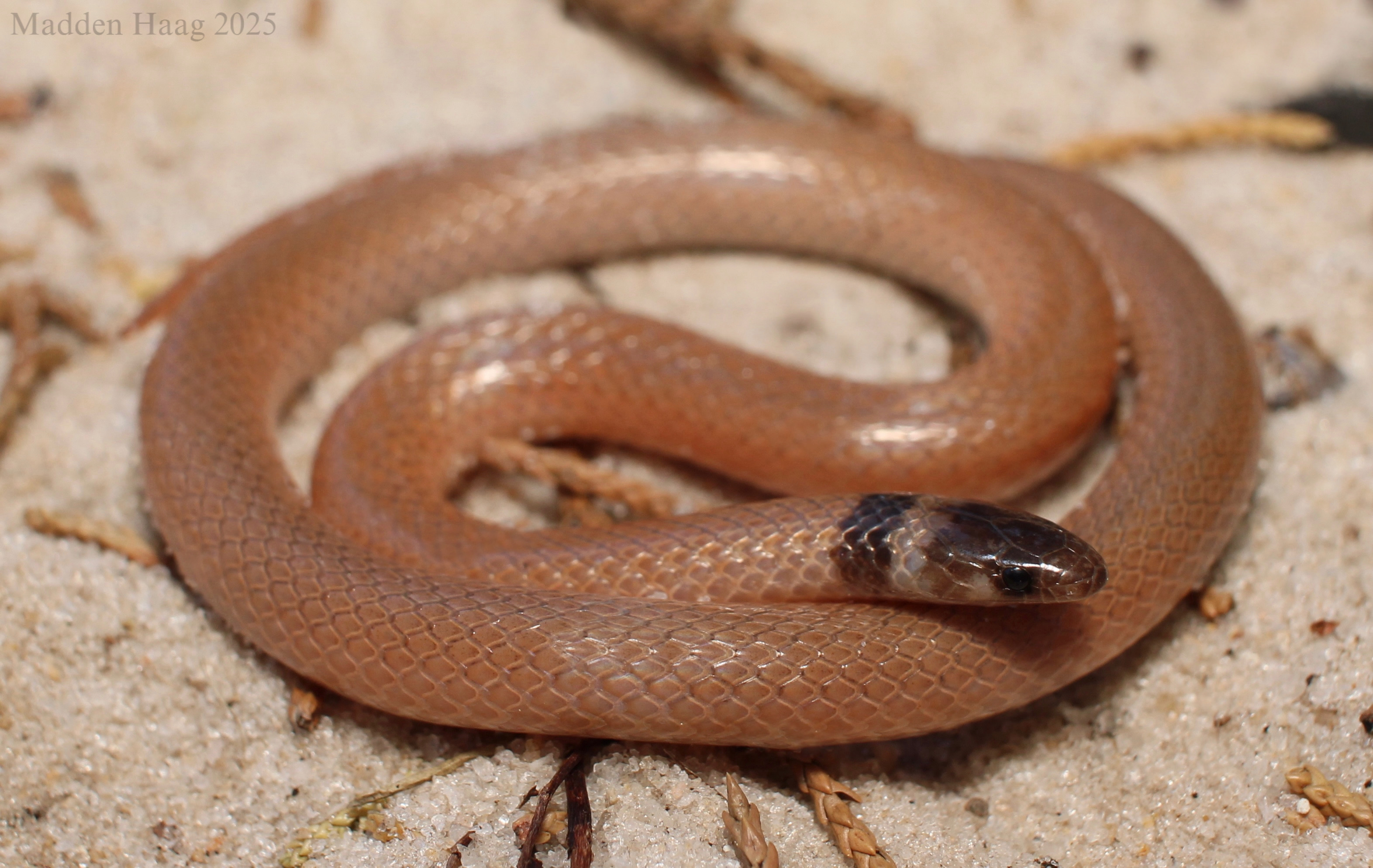
- Southeastern crowned snake (Tantilla coronata)

Conservation status
- Least Concern (IUCN 3.1)

Scientific classification
- Kingdom: Animalia
- Phylum: Chordata
- Class: Reptilia
- Order: Squamata
- Suborder: Serpentes
- Family: Colubridae
- Genus: Tantilla
- Species: T. coronata

Binomial name
- Tantilla coronata Baird & Girard, 1853
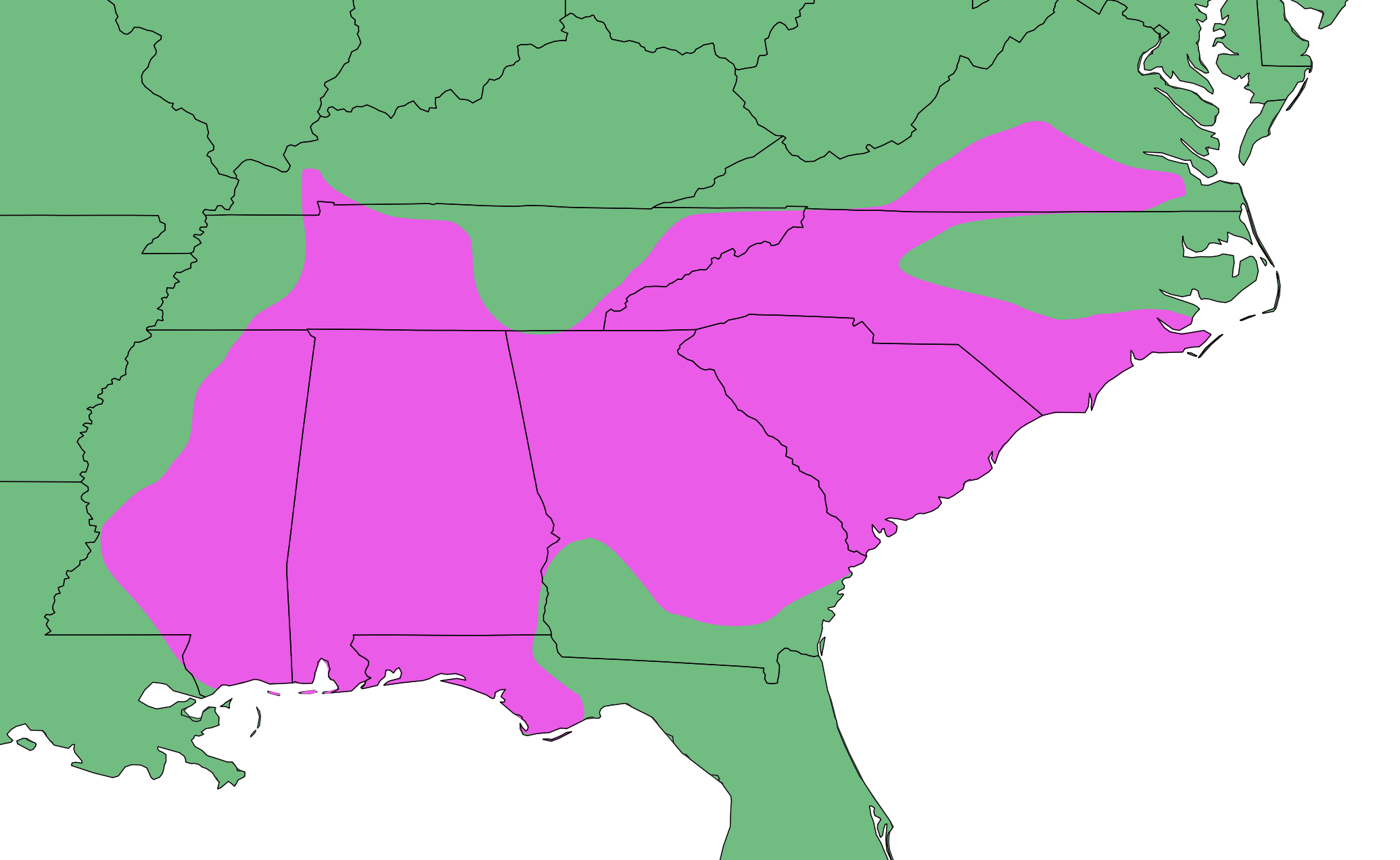

Synonyms
- Tantilla coronata Baird & Girard, 1853; Homalocranium wagneri Jan, 1862; Homalocranium coronatum — Boulenger, 1896; Tantilla coronata — Cope, 1900

= Southeastern crown snake =

Species of snake

The southeastern crown snake (Tantilla coronata) is a common species of small colubrid snake endemic to the southeastern United States.

== Description ==
Tantilla coronata is a small, slender snake, greyish-brown or solid light brown in color. It has a black, pointed head with a yellowish or cream band between the head and the neck. This is followed by a black collar 3 to 5 scales wide. The remainder of the back is reddish brown. The belly is light pink or solid white. It has smooth dorsal scales in 15 rows and a divided anal plate. Adults average 20–25 cm (8-10 inches) in total length.

== Natural habitat ==
The snake is found in Alabama, northwestern Florida, Georgia, extreme southern Indiana, western Kentucky, eastern Louisiana, Mississippi, North Carolina, South Carolina, Tennessee, and south-central Virginia. The largest populations of the species is found in areas with sandy or loose soils and plentiful organic litter. The southeastern crown snake is commonly found in both damp and dry woodland habitats.

== Behavior and diet ==
The snake is active during the day during the warmer months of the year, and can be found underneath rocks, logs and organic litter. It hibernates during the coldest months of winter, but is active beneath organic litter on warm winter days. The snake travels overland at night, generally during the hours of early evening. It is considered a skilled burrower in sandy soil, and appears to "swim" in the sand when attempting to escape capture.

The snake feeds on several kinds of small prey, including termites, worms, centipedes, earth-dwelling insect larvae, and spiders. In the back of the snake's jaw are small, chiseled fangs that are used to inject venom into their prey. All crowned snakes are assumed to be non-venomous to humans.

== Reproduction ==
The southeastern crown snake is oviparous, generally laying 1-3 eggs per clutch. Mating occurs in the months from spring through fall. Females that mate in the fall store sperm until the following spring. Females lay their eggs typically in June and July. The eggs hatch in the fall.

== Predators and defense ==
Southeastern crown snakes are preyed upon by many carnivorous vertebrates that live in forested habitats. Their most common predator is the kingsnake and coral snake. The snake will attempt to burrow in the sand when threatened, or by crawling beneath organic litter and other debris. The snake does not bite when captured, but releases a foul-smelling musk from their scent glands.

== Conservation status ==
In most areas of its range, the southeastern crown snake is not considered to be a conservation risk. In Indiana, the snake is listed as an endangered species. Damage or destruction to their forested habitats will have an adverse effect on the future population of the species.
