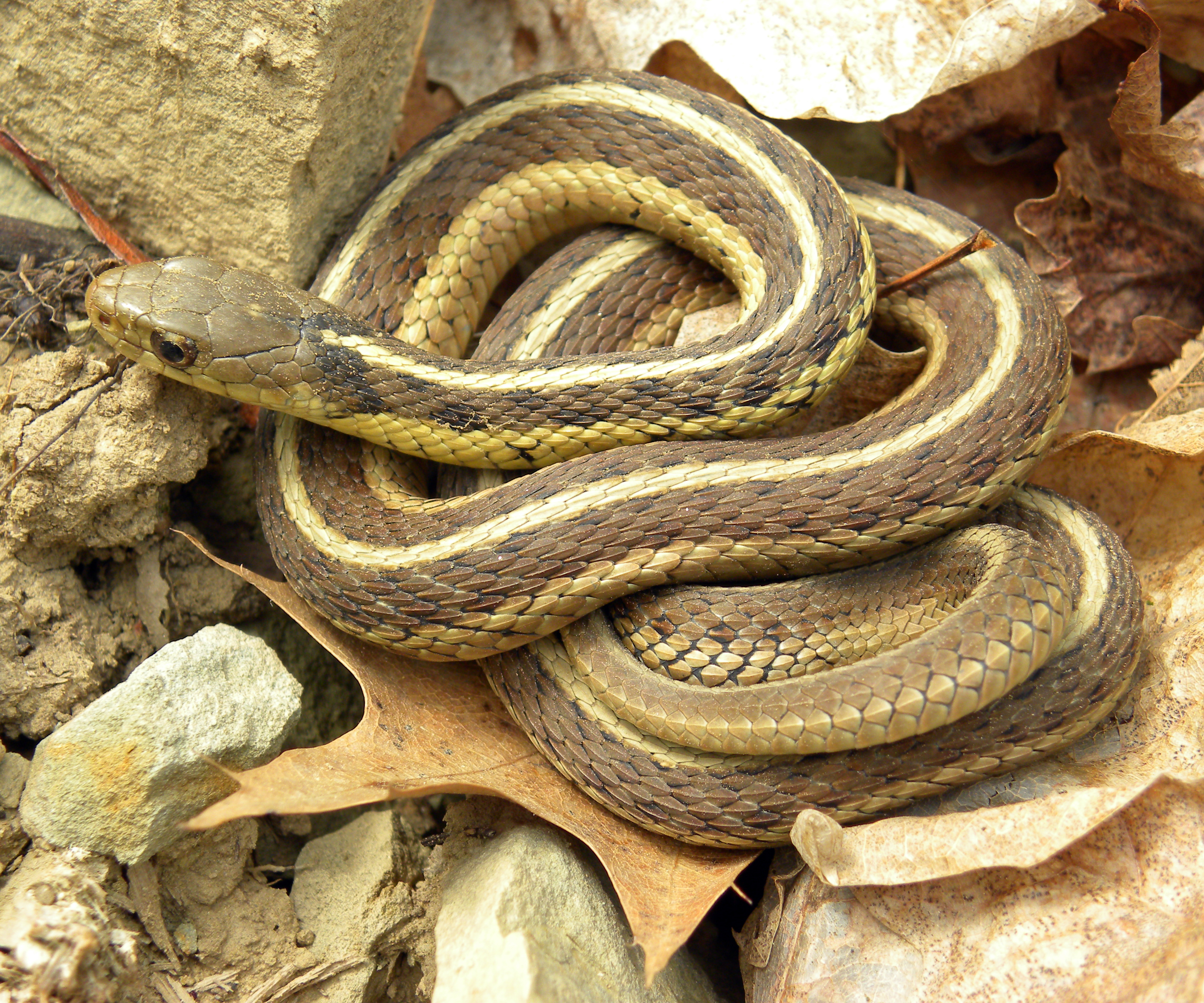

Conservation status
- Secure (NatureServe)

Scientific classification
- Kingdom: Animalia
- Phylum: Chordata
- Class: Reptilia
- Order: Squamata
- Suborder: Serpentes
- Family: Colubridae
- Genus: Thamnophis
- Species: T. sirtalis
- Subspecies: T. s. sirtalis

Trinomial name
- Thamnophis sirtalis sirtalis (Linnaeus, 1758)

= Eastern garter snake =

Subspecies of snake

The eastern garter snake (Thamnophis sirtalis sirtalis) is a medium-sized snake endemic to North America.

== Taxonomy ==
=== Etymology ===
The scientific name Thamnophis sirtalis sirtalis is a combination of Ancient Greek and New Latin that means "bush snake that looks like a garter strap". The generic name Thamnophis is derived from the Greek "thamnos" (bush) and "ophis" (snake) and the specific name sirtalis is derived from the New Latin "siratalis" (like a garter), a reference to the snake's color pattern resembling a striped garter strap.

== Description ==
Eastern garter snakes average between 46–66 cm (18–26 in) long. The longest recorded length was 124 cm (48.7 in) long. Females are typically larger than males. They are either a greenish, brown, or black color and have a distinct yellow or white stripe.

=== Venom ===
Although the eastern garter snake is often considered non-venomous, garter snakes do have a Duvernoy's gland, and the secretion from the gland may be chewed into prey during bites. The secretion is noted to cause hemorrhaging in mice and has produced non-allergic symptoms in at least one bite on a human.

== Distribution and habitat ==
The eastern garter snake has the widest geographic range of any garter snake, extending from the Atlantic to the Pacific coasts and reaching farther north than any other snake species in the Western Hemisphere. Their distribution ranges all across America but tends not to be present in western deserts. In New England, the snake is described as the "most widespread and ubiquitous" serpent, from wilderness to urban environments and from sea level to high elevations.

The eastern garter snake will live in a variety of environments, with a preference for grassy or shrubby fields, including abandoned farmland, outbuildings and trash dumps. In particular the snake likes to inhabit stone walls that separate the forest from fields. It is also found along moist habitats such as lakes, rivers, streams, swamps, bogs, ponds, drainage ditches, and quarries. Snakes are present in urban environments in habitats that include "city parks, cemeteries and suburban yards and gardens". Eastern garter snakes like to conceal themselves under logs, stones and other debris that allow them to bask in the sunlight and quickly seek refuge from predators. Eastern garter snakes have also been found to inhabit crayfish burrows during the hibernating season. Krulikowski notes that "old poultry farms with discarded sheet-metal incubation trays provide warm, moist hiding places."

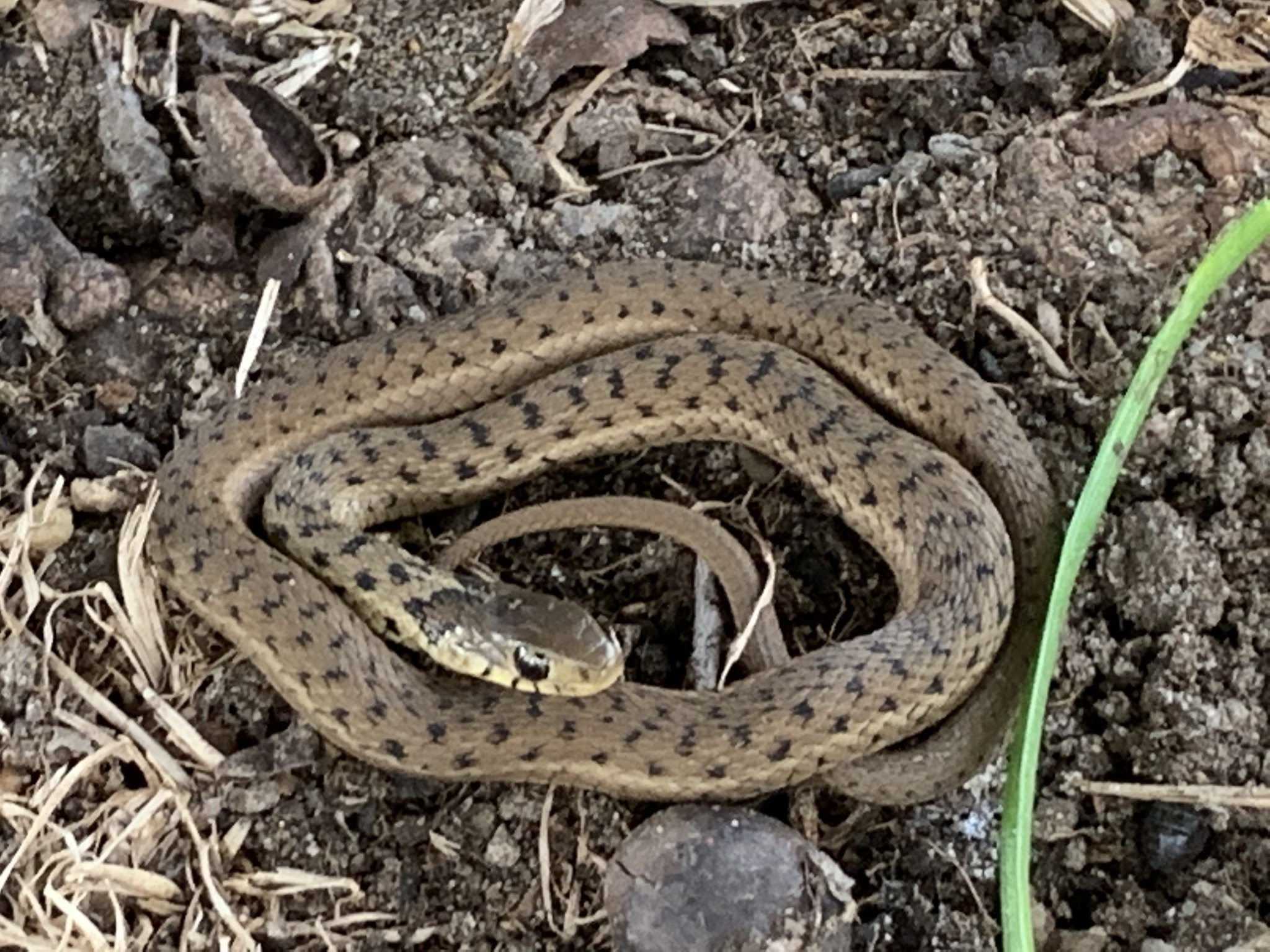
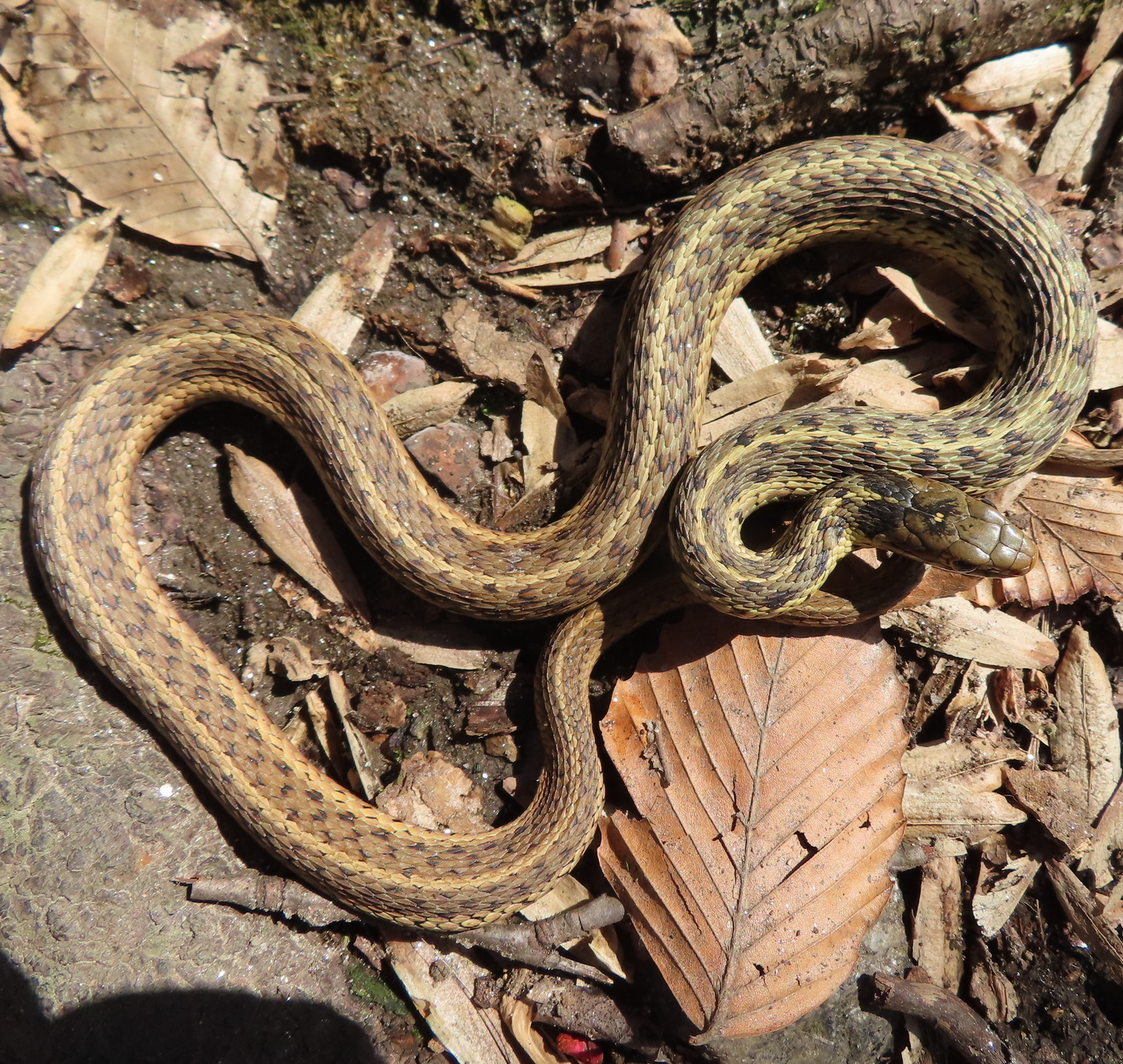
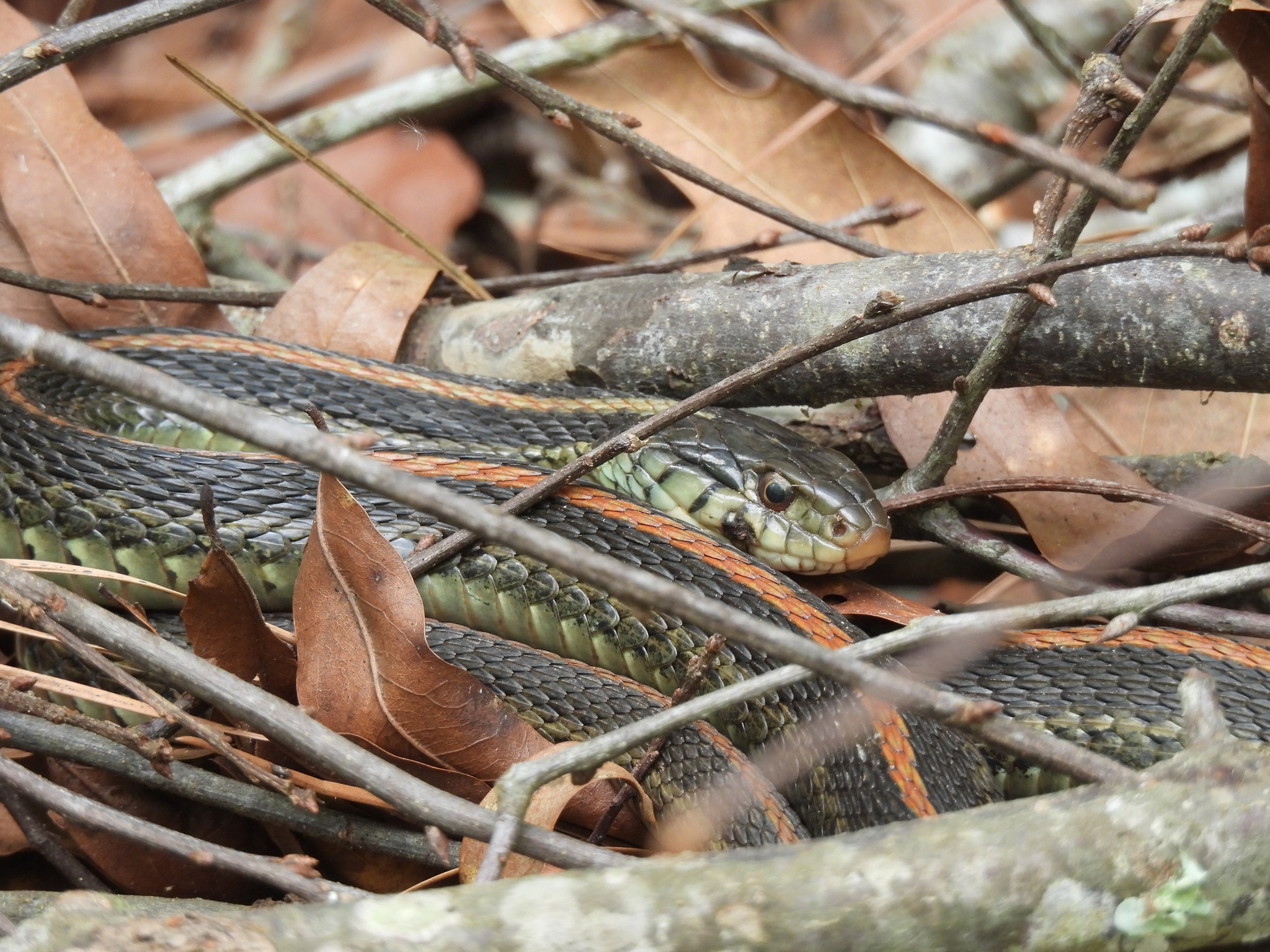
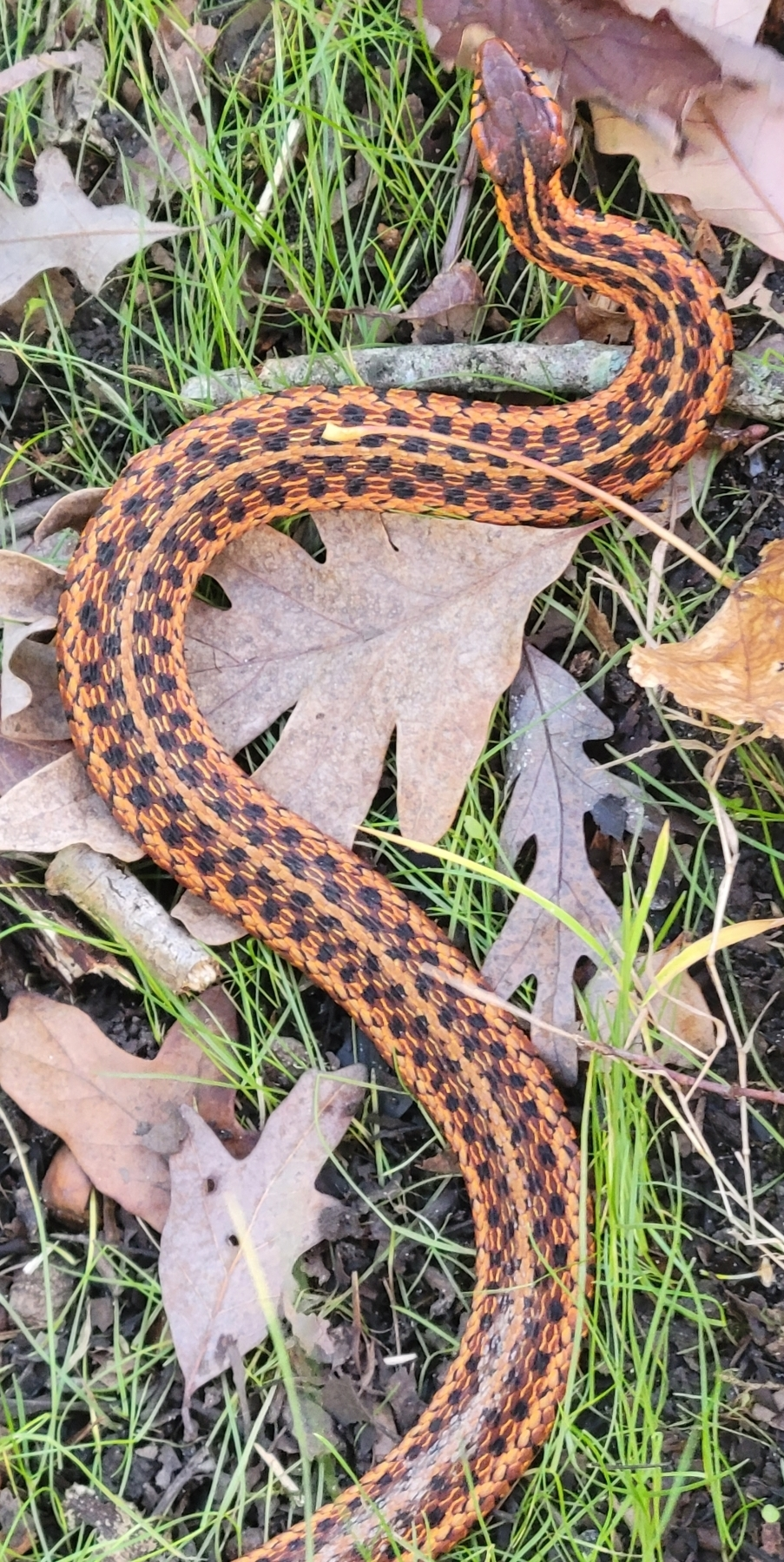
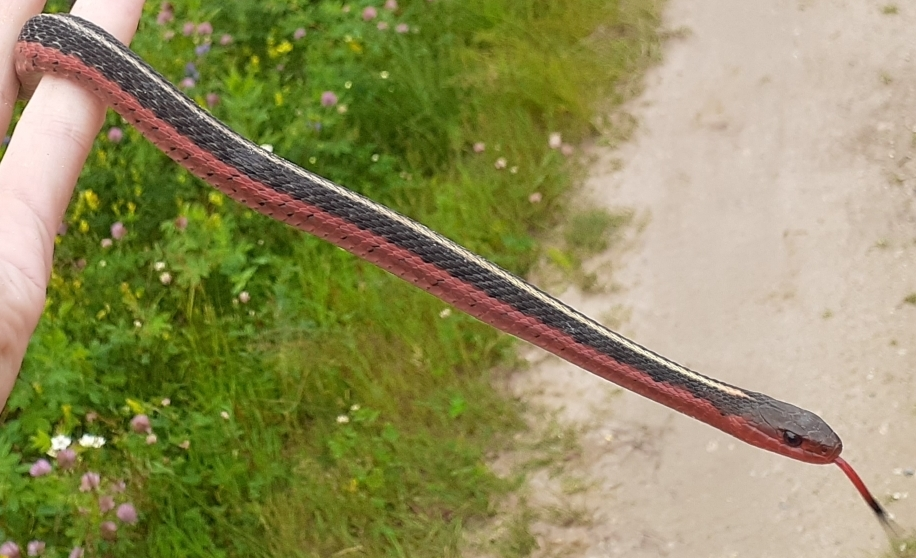
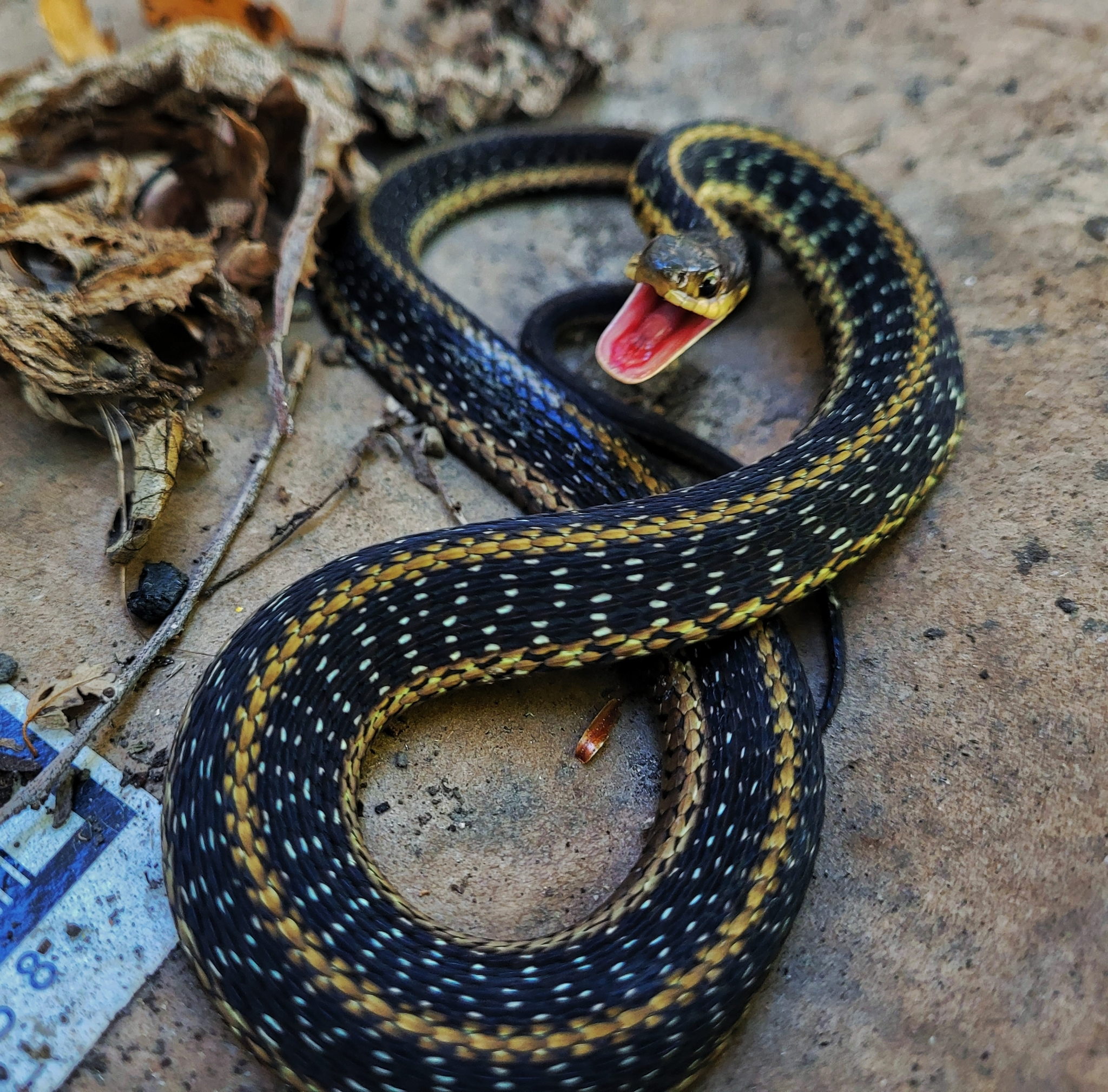
Colour variation in the eastern garter snake

== Ecology and behavior ==
=== Hunting and diet ===
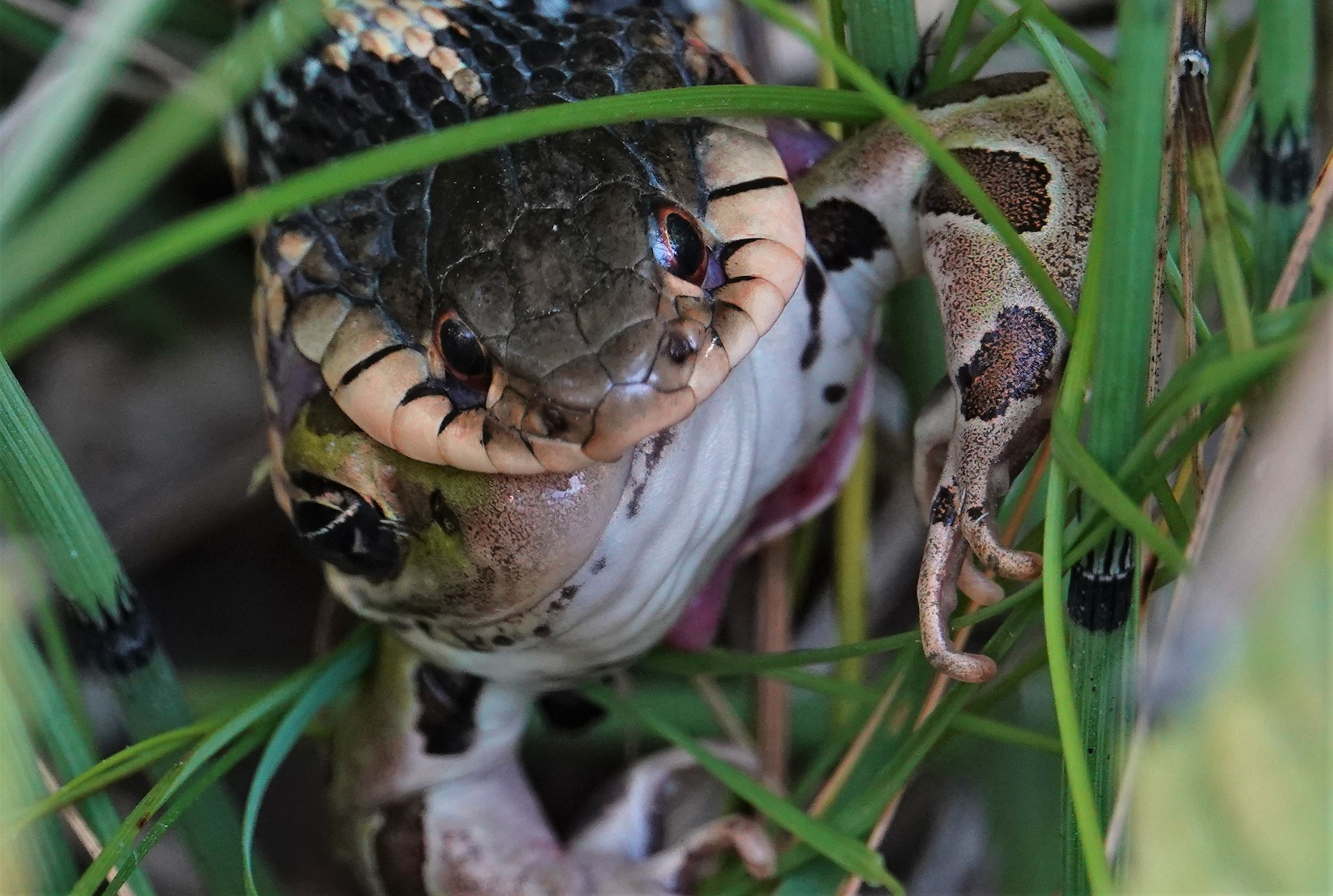
An eastern garter snake eating a northern leopard frog (Lithobates pipiens).

The majority of the eastern garter snake's diet (~80%) consists of earthworms, though they have a secondary preference (~15%) for amphibian prey (esp. frogs) as well. As they mature, their preference in prey will undergo an ontogenetic shift. Younger eastern garter snakes (those under 40 cm (16 in) in length) prey almost exclusively upon earthworms (~88%) and smaller amphibians (~8%), such as spring peepers and northern cricket frogs, and generally avoid taking warm-blooded prey. Mature snakes rely more on amphibian prey (which now comprise ~19% of their diet), especially larger amphibians like green frogs and northern leopard frogs, though earthworms still make up the bulk of their diet (~76%).

However, eastern garter snakes are opportunistic predators, and will readily consume almost any creature they can swallow. Other prey records for this subspecies include caterpillars, leeches, mudminnows, the Jefferson salamander, and the eastern meadow vole. Large adults will even target small birds if the opportunity presents itself, such as song sparrows, goldfinches, and chipping sparrows.

=== Predator avoidance ===
The eastern garter snake is known to flatten its head and anterior body and strike forward if it is bothered. Juveniles have been observed to engage in this behavior and strike at such a force that they leave the ground entirely. Adults also will spray musk from glands in their tail, and sometimes defecate to discourage predators. Body temperature influences defensive behaviors. Snakes with higher body temperatures tend to flee as they have more energy. Larger males and pregnant females are more likely to stand their ground.

=== Social behavior ===
Movement and home range for eastern garter snakes is dependent on resource availability. Females typically have a larger home range compared to males. Juvenile eastern garter snakes will actively seek out social interactions, will join and remain with large groups, and can recognize specific individuals and groups.

=== Reproduction ===
Eastern garter snakes are ovoviviparous, giving birth to live young. Mating occurs in mid-to-late April and in the fall. Mating occurs "mating balls" where many males try to court a single female. Mating can last up to 5 days or more. The young are 13–23 cm (5–9 in) long at birth.

== Conservation status ==
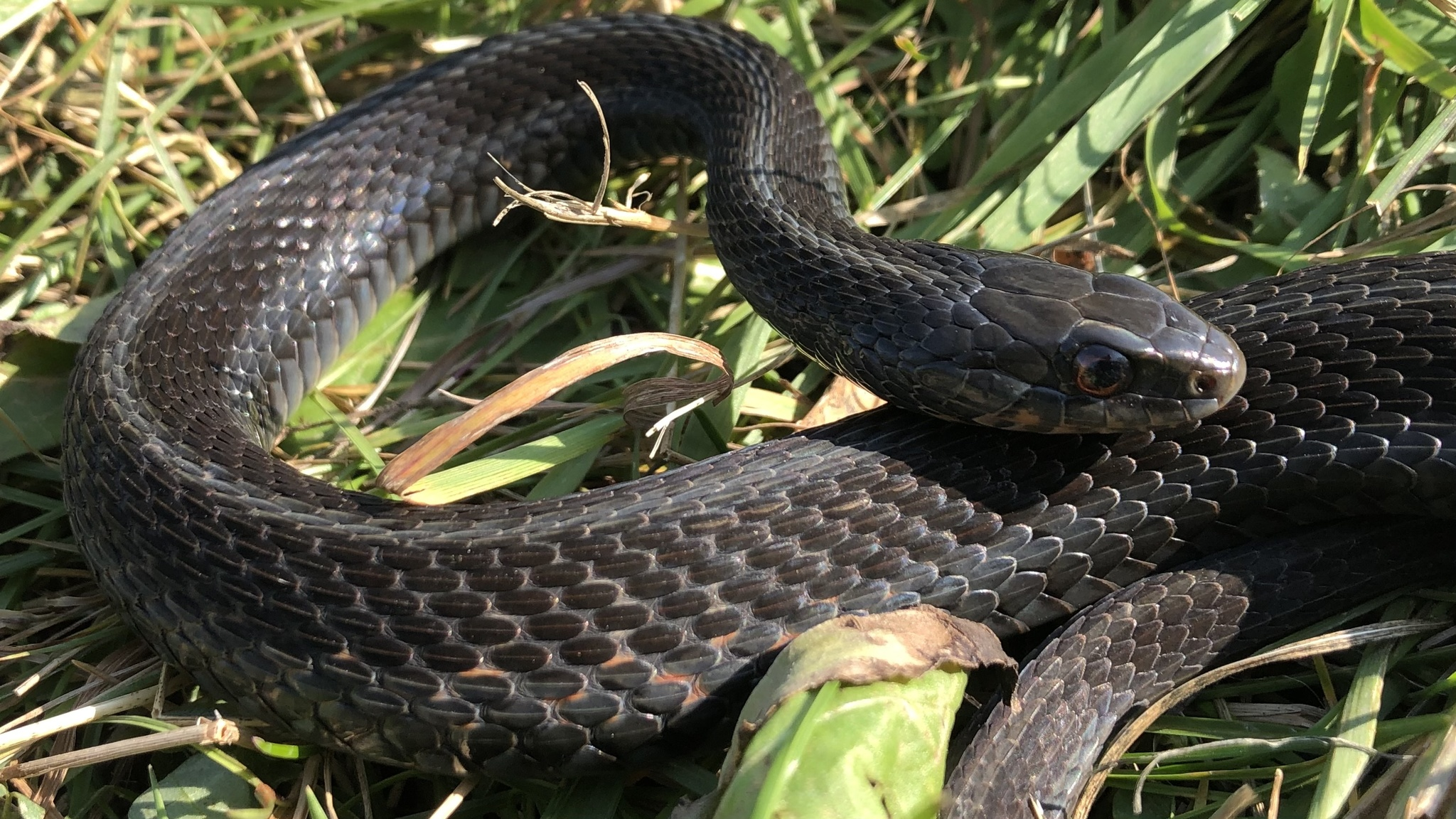
Melanistic eastern garter snake

As of 2024, the eastern garter snake has not been assessed by the IUCN Red List, nor has it been assessed by the Committee on the Status of Endangered Wildlife in Canada (COSEWIC). Its parent species, the common garter snake (Thamnophis sirtalis), was last assessed by the IUCN in 2007 and determined to be of least-concern due its wide geographic distribution, (presumed) large population, and lack of significant threats to its survival. In 2016, NatureServe assessed the eastern garter snake to be a secure subspecies (G5T5) globally, and nationally secure (N5) in Canada.
