= List of snakes of South Carolina =

This is a list of the known varieties of snakes in South Carolina

== Nonvenomous ==
Image	Binomial Name	Name
	Carphophis amoenus amoenus	Eastern worm snake
Scarlet snake	Cemophora coccinea copei	Scarlet snake
Closeup of head of Black Racer snake flicking its tongue	Coluber constrictor	Black racer
Northern ringneck snake	Diadophis punctatus edwardsii	Northern ringneck snake
Southern ringneck snake	Diadophis punctatus punctatus	Southern ringneck snake
	Pantherophis guttatus	Corn snake
	Pantherophis alleghaniensis	Central rat snake
Yellow rat snake	Pantherophis quadrivittatus	Eastern rat snake
Eastern mud snake	Farancia abacura abacura	Eastern mud snake
Rainbow snake	Farancia erytrogramma erytrogramma	Rainbow Snake
Eastern hognose snake	Heterodon platirhinos	Eastern hognose snake
Southern hognose snake	Heterodon simus	Southern hognose snake
Mole king snake	Lampropeltis calligaster	Mole kingsnake
Eastern king snake	Lampropeltis getula getula	Eastern kingsnake
Scarlet King snake	Lampropeltis elapsoides	Scarlet kingsnake
Eastern milk snake	Lampropeltis triangulum triangulum	Eastern milk snake
Eastern coachwhip	Masticophis flagellum flagellum	Eastern coachwhip
Redbelly water snake	Nerodia erythrogaster erythrogaster	Redbelly water snake
Banded water snake	Nerodia fasciata fasciata	Banded water snake
Florida green water snake	Nerodia floridana	Florida green water snake
Midland water snake	Nerodia sipedon pleuralis	Midland water snake
Northern water snake	Nerodia sipedon sipedon	Northern water snake
Brown water snake	Nerodia taxispilota	Brown water snake
Rough green snake	Opheodrys aestivus	Rough green snake
Pine snake	Pituophis melanoleucus	Pine snake
Glossy crayfish snake	Liodytes rigida	Glossy crayfish snake
Queen snake	Regina septemvittata	Queen snake
Pine woods snake	Rhadinaea flavilata	Pine woods snake
Carolina Swamp Snake	Seminatrix pygaea paludis	Carolina swamp snake
Brown snake	Storeria dekayi	Brown snake
Redbelly snake	Storeria occipitomaculata obscura	Florida redbelly snake
	Storeria occipitomaculata occipitomaculata	Northern redbelly snake
Southeastern Crown Snake	Tantilla coronata	Southeastern crowned snake
Peninsula ribbon snake	Thamnophis sauritus sackenii	Peninsula ribbon snake
Eastern Ribbon Snake	Thamnophis sauritus sauritus	Eastern ribbon snake
Eastern Garter snake	Thamnophis sirtalis sirtalis	Eastern garter snake
Rough earth snake	Virginia striatula	Rough earth snake
Eastern smooth earth snake	Virginia valeriae valeriae	Eastern smooth earth snake

Florida Water Snake.

== Venomous ==
Image	Binomial Name	Name
Copperhead	Agkistrodon contortrix	Eastern copperhead
Cottonmouth	Agkistrodon piscivorus	Northern cottonmouth
Eastern diamondback	Crotalus adamanteus	Eastern diamondback
Timber rattlesnake	Crotalus horridus horridus	Timber rattlesnake
Eastern coral snake	Micrurus fulvius fulvius	Eastern coral snake
Dusky pigmy rattlesnake	Sistrurus miliarius barbouri	Dusky pigmy rattlesnake
Carolina pigmy rattlesnake	Sistrurus miliarius miliarius	Carolina pigmy rattlesnake
