= Earth snake =

Earth snake may refer to the following genera:

- Geophis
- Haldea, a monotypic genus in the Colubridae with its sole representative, the rough earth snake, Haldea striatula

It may also refer to the following species:

- Smooth earth snake, Virginia valeriae
