= Bayou =

Body of water in flat, low-lying areas

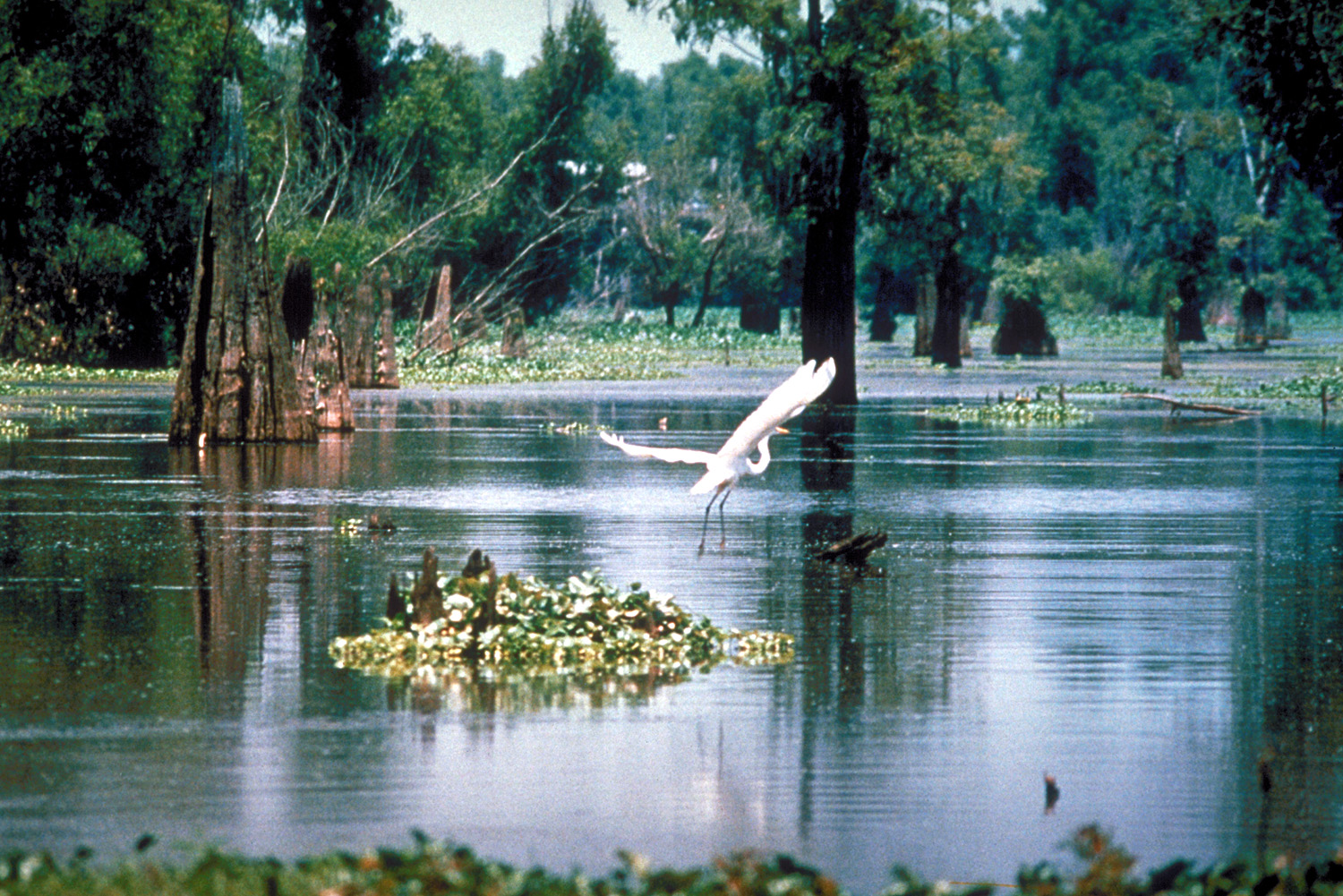
The Atchafalaya Basin, located in Louisiana, contains several bayous.

In usage in the Southern United States, a bayou (/ˈbaɪ.uː, ˈbaɪ.oʊ/) is a body of water typically found in a flat, low-lying area. It may refer to an extremely slow-moving stream (often with a poorly defined shoreline), marshy lake, or wetland. They typically contain brackish water highly conducive to fish life and plankton. Bayous are commonly found in the Gulf Coast region of the southern United States, especially in the Mississippi River Delta, though they also exist elsewhere.

A bayou is often an anabranch or minor braid of a braided channel that is slower than the main stem, usually becoming boggy and stagnant. Though fauna varies by region, many bayous are home to crawfish, certain species of shrimp, other shellfish, and leeches, catfish, frogs, toads, salamanders, newts, American alligators, turtles, and snakes such as watersnakes, swampsnakes, mudsnakes, crayfish snakes, and cottonmouths. Bayous are also home to semi-aquatic mammals such as beavers and river otters and land mammals such as white-tailed deer, black bears, bobcats, and raccoons. Common birds include anhingas, egrets, herons, spoonbills, as well as many other species. Taxodium (bald cypress) tends to be one of the dominant trees in bayous.

== Etymology ==
The word entered American English via Louisiana French in Louisiana and is thought to originate from the Choctaw word bayuk, which means "small stream". After appearing in the 17th century, the term is found in 18th century accounts and maps, often as bayouc or bayouque, where it was eventually shortened to its current form. The first settlements of the Bayou Têche and other bayous were founded by the Louisiana Creoles, and the bayous are commonly associated with Creole and Cajun culture.

An alternative spelling, "buyou", is also known to have been in use, as in "Pine Buyou", used in a description by Congress in 1833 of Arkansas Territory. As of 2016 "bye-you" US: /ˈbaɪ.juː/ is the most common pronunciation, while a few use "bye-oh" US: /ˈbaɪ.oʊ/, although that pronunciation is declining.

== Geomorphology ==
Bayous form in low-gradient coastal and river delta landscapes where water moves slowly and sediment builds up over long periods. They often develop from abandoned river channels that are cut off from the main flow as rivers meander, shift course, or deposit enough sediment to block or redirect the flow. In deltaic regions like coastal Louisiana, subsidence, tidal exchange, and the constant deposition of fine sediments create shallow, slow-moving waterways that evolve into bayous. These channels can also form along distributaries and backwater areas where the river's current loses energy. Because of the low bank slope and frequent flooding, organic material and fine sediment accumulate, shaping the marshy banks and wetland systems associated with bayous.

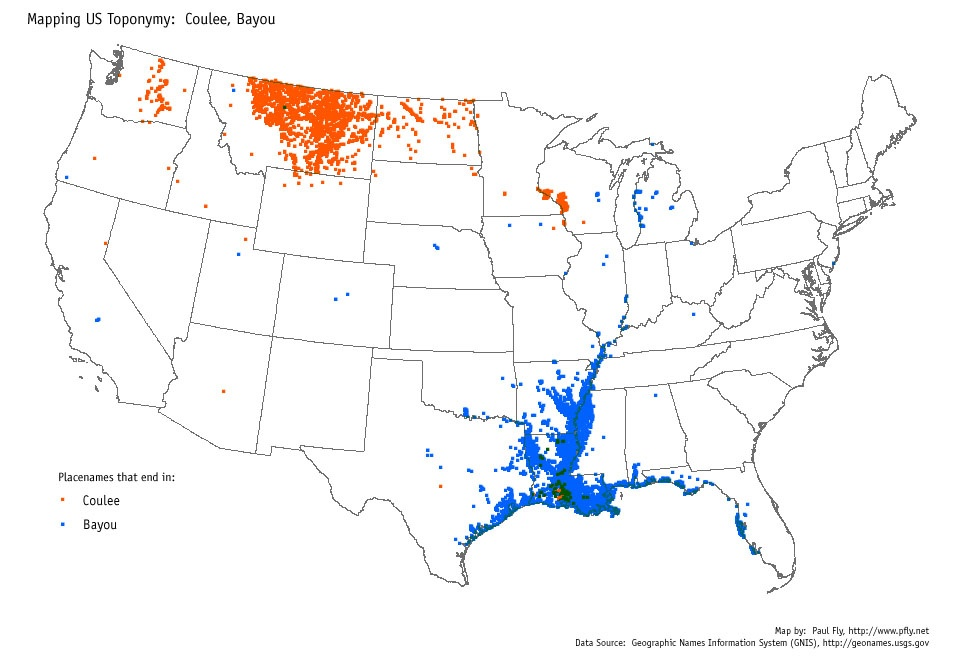
⬤ Place names ending in "bayou" (in blue) and "coulee" (in orange) in the United States

== Geography ==
The term bayou country is most closely associated with Cajun and Creole cultural groups derived from French settlers and stretching along the Gulf Coast from Houston (nicknamed the "Bayou City") to Mobile, Alabama, and picking back up in South Florida around the Everglades, with its center in New Orleans. The term may also be associated with the homelands of certain Choctaw tribal groups.

== Environmental risks ==
Anthropogenic influences have damaged bayou ecosystems over the years. Bayous are susceptible to pollution such as runoff from nearby urban communities (which can result in eutrophication) and oil spills given their low-lying position in the watershed. Many bayous have been cleared away by human activity as well, with those in Louisiana having shrunk by 1,900 square miles (4,900 square kilometers) since the 1930s.

When wetlands are drained, dredged, or cut with canals, the natural flow of water slows or is redirected, often leaving bayous more stagnant and vulnerable to further pollution. Coastal erosion and land subsidence add even more pressure, especially in places like southern Louisiana, where the land is already sinking rapidly. Rising sea levels push saltwater farther inland, stressing freshwater plants and animals that rely on bayous for habitat. Over time, these combined pressures weaken the bayou's ecological balance and make it more difficult for the system to recover after storms, droughts, and other natural disturbances.

=== Agriculture ===
Farming activities introduce nutrients into bayou ecosystems. Row crop agricultural land use is common (75–86% of the watershed) in bayou watersheds, given the unique physical characteristics like flat topography and alluvial soils. Agricultural activity produces nitrogen and phosphorus byproducts from fertilizers, which can drastically alter delicate balances in freshwater and marine ecosystems. A study conducted on three agricultural bayous in the Mississippi River Delta found that the addition of nitrogen (N) and phosphorus (P) to sample mesocosms affected the decomposition of maize crop and willow oak detritus. While both species showed increased decomposition rates after nutrient enhancement with N and P, the maize crop decomposed faster than the native willow oak. The maize crop also had a significantly faster microbial respiration rate. The changes in microbial respiration of a wetland system impact its carbon exchange with the environment. Inhibiting a wetland's ability to sequester carbon further damages the status of the wetland as a carbon sink. This poses larger-scale issues as it alters the exchange of carbon dioxide with the atmosphere and environment.

The use of pesticides in agriculture poses further threats to bayou ecosystems. A study conducted on three bayous (Cow Oak, Howden, Roundaway) in the western Mississippi River watershed found that pesticides released into bayou sediments cause significant impairment of the amphipod Hyalella azteca both spatially and temporally. Despite being banned 40 years ago in the United States by the Environmental Protection Agency, traces of dichlorodiphenyltrichloroethane (DDT), once used in agriculture as an insecticide, were found in sediment and amphipod tissue. DDT is a probable carcinogen, and it has been linked to adverse health effects in both humans and wildlife.

=== Oil spills ===
Oil spills harm bayous as oil is toxic to most animals. In vapor form, oil leads to lung, liver, and nervous system dysfunction if inhaled. Ingested oil poses threats to the digestive tract. Oil matts feathers and fur, disrupting the animal's ability to insulate itself in colder temperatures. Matted bird feathers lose properties that aid in flying and swimming. Such disruptions in individual adaptive ability may lead to trophic cascades in a bayou community.

Several oil spills have impacted bayou regions, including the Deepwater Horizon oil spill of 2010. This oil spill occurred off the Louisiana coast and resulted in the deaths of 11 people and the release of over 4.9 million barrels of oil into the ocean. The bayou wetlands of Barataria Bay experienced increased shoreline erosion as a direct result of the oil spill. This was determined by examining rates of wetland loss in the region from the year prior to the oil spill and contrasting that with the rates of wetland loss after the oil spill. The study noted significant land loss in regions not impacted by wave activity, further demonstrating that the land degradation was caused by oil rather than other sources of weathering from waves and cyclones.

Other notable oil spills affecting bayous include 4,000 U.S. gallons (about 15,141.65 L) of oil spilling in a lake near Bayou Sorrel and 20,000 U.S. gallons (about 75,708.24 L) of oil spilling into St. Bernard Parish waters and the adjacent Bayou Bienvenue. Both incidents occurred in 2022.

=== Impervious surfaces ===
Human development activities, such as the increase of impervious surfaces, results in quicker, high intensity flood pulses, delivering larger quantities of nutrients to the ecosystem at a much more rapid rate. Impervious surfaces include roads, housing developments, and parking lots that replace natural vegetation, typically associated with human development and urbanization. When impervious surfaces are installed, the layer of soil that stores water is damaged/removed, resulting in a lack of permeable surfaces to absorb rainfall and floodwater.

==== Heavy metal contamination ====
Bayous have experienced trends of land cover loss and conversion to impervious surfaces, of which has been associated with influxes of metals such as aluminum, copper, iron, lead, and zinc. Heavy metals in sediments and ultimately the waters of bayous bioaccumulate in organisms to spread toxins throughout various trophic levels. This harms both the health of individuals in that ecosystem and the humans who ingest the fish and other aquatic organisms with potential metal contamination. These metals do not occur suddenly but result from long-term exposure to industrial discharges, stormwater runoff, old infrastructure, and disturbed soils. Once these pollutants settle into sediments, they can remain there for a very long time and have the potential to enter the food chain. These pollutants are mainly invisible to the naked eye, so the water might appear clean on the surface. In many bayous, the slow flow of water increases susceptibility of heavy metal buildup. Over time, this affects the entire ecosystem, affecting fish reproduction, plant growth, and the overall balance of the habitat. Communities that rely on these waters for fishing or recreation face higher risks when contamination increases.

== Notable examples ==
- Armand Bayou
- Bayou Bartholomew
- Bayou Brevelle
- Bayou Corne
- Bayou La Batre
- Bayou Lafourche
- Bayou St. John
- Bayou Teche
- Big Bayou Canot
- Buffalo Bayou
- Cypress Bayou

== See also ==
- Backswamp – Environment on a floodplain where deposits settle after a flood
- Billabong – Australian term for an oxbow lake or other waterhole
- Coulee – Type of valley or drainage zone
- Oxbow lake – U-shaped lake or pool left by an ancient river meander
- Yazoo stream – Hydrologic term
