= Storeria hidalgoensis =

Conservation status
- Vulnerable (IUCN 3.1)

Scientific classification
- Kingdom: Animalia
- Phylum: Chordata
- Class: Reptilia
- Order: Squamata
- Suborder: Serpentes
- Family: Colubridae
- Genus: Storeria
- Species: S. hidalgoensis

Binomial name
- Storeria hidalgoensis Taylor, 1942

Synonyms
- C[oluber]. occipito-maculatus Storer, 1839 (part.); Storeria hidalgoensis Taylor, 1942; Storeria occipitomaculata hidalgoensis – Trapido, 1944; Storeria hidalgoensis – Flores-Villela, 1993

Species of snake

Storeria hidalgoensis, commonly known as the Mexican yellow-bellied brown snake or the Mexican yellowbelly brown snake, is a nonvenomous snake in the family Colubridae. It is endemic to the Sierra Madre Oriental of Mexico.

== Taxonomy ==
First considered a Mexican population of Storeria occipitomaculata by Storer in 1839, Storeria hidalgoensis was described as separate species in 1942 by Taylor. In 1944 it was reassigned as a subspecies of Storeria occipitomaculata by Trapido, and then in 1993 Flores-Villela reinstated it to full species rank, based partly on allopatry. Some feel that this re-evaluation to full species rank requires additional study.

The holotype of this species is deposited at the University of Illinois Museum of Natural History (Specimen no. 25061). It is a male collected by E.H. Taylor on 13 August 1938.

== Geographic range ==
It is found in the eastern and south-central regions of the central Mexican plateau where it ranges from Nuevo León, through Tamaulipas and eastern San Luis Potosí to northeastern Hidalgo at elevations between 1,400 and 1,800 m (4,600 and 5,900 ft) above sea level.

== Description ==
Adults are small and somewhat slender with a maximum length of 33.7 cm (13.3 in). Dorsal body color varies from gray to light brown, tan, reddish, or dark brown (grayish to dark brown in preservative) usually with small gray flecks but no dark spots or crossbands. Ventral coloring is either gray to pink, or may have dark gray pigment at least laterally. Its head is black, especially posteriorly, with small gray flecks. A dark wedge-shaped mark lies behind each parietal and a light spot is usually present within the mark. Labials are either gray, or contain variable amounts of dark pigment with the fifth supralabial being the lightest of the series. The dorsal scales are without pits with some faintly keeled.

== Habitat ==
This is a terrestrial species that occurs in primary and secondary cloud forest, pine forest, pine-oak forest and fir forests.

== Reproduction ==
Storeria hidalgoensis are viviparous.

== Diet ==
The biology of these snakes is poorly known and further study has been recommended.

== Etymology ==
The specific name, hidalgoensis, is composed of hidalgo-, which refers to the Mexican state in which the type specimen was collected, and the Latin suffix
-ensis, which means "belonging to".

== Bibliography ==
- Flores-Villela, O.A. 1993. Herpetofauna Mexicana: annotated list of the species of amphibians and reptiles of Mexico, recent taxonomic changes, and new species. Carnegie Mus. Nat. Hist. Spec. Publ. (17): iv + 73 pp, 2 figures, 1 table.
