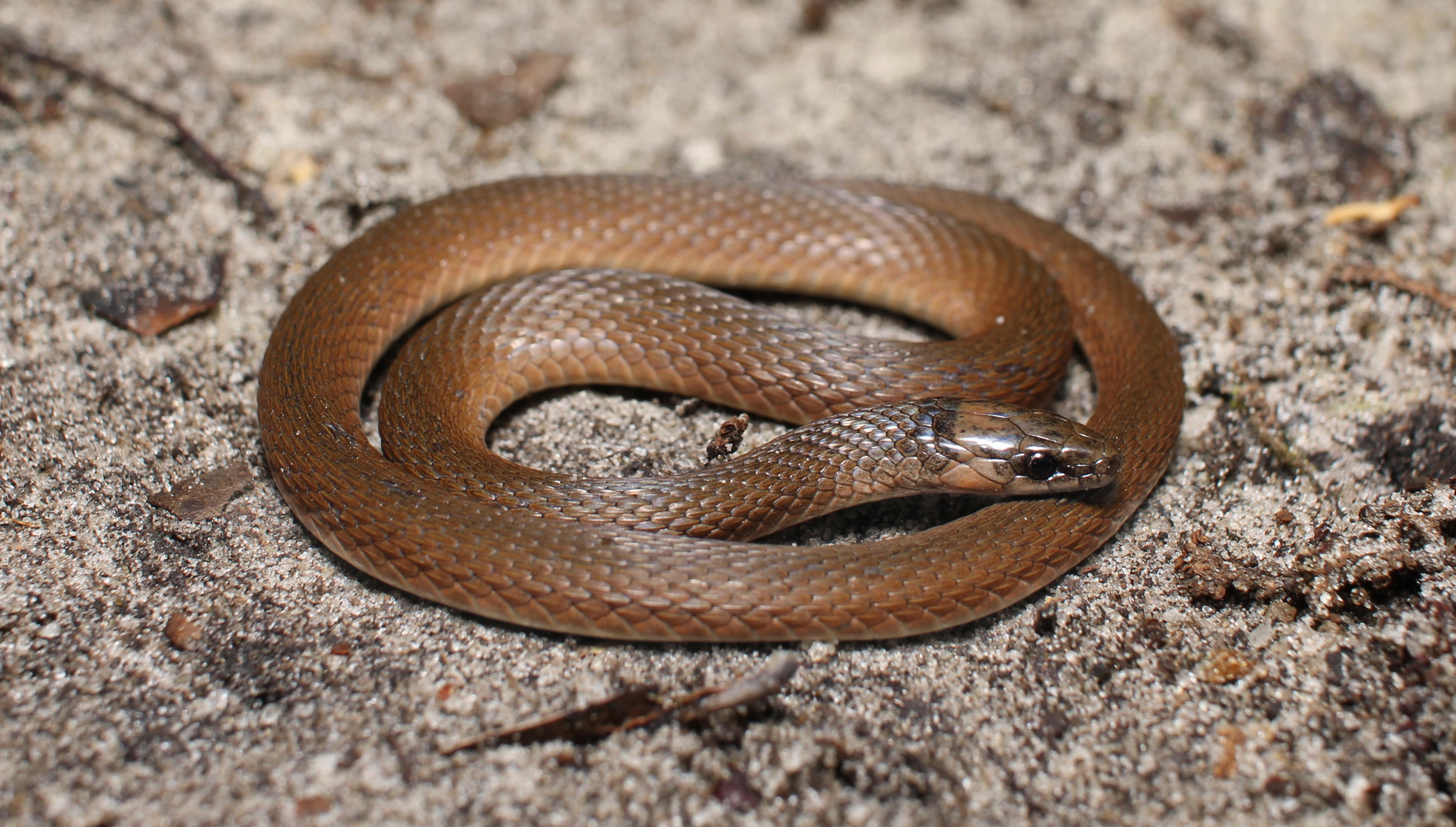

Conservation status
- Least Concern (IUCN 3.1)

Scientific classification
- Kingdom: Animalia
- Phylum: Chordata
- Class: Reptilia
- Order: Squamata
- Suborder: Serpentes
- Family: Colubridae
- Genus: Virginia
- Species: V. striatula

Binomial name
- Virginia striatula (Linnaeus, 1766)
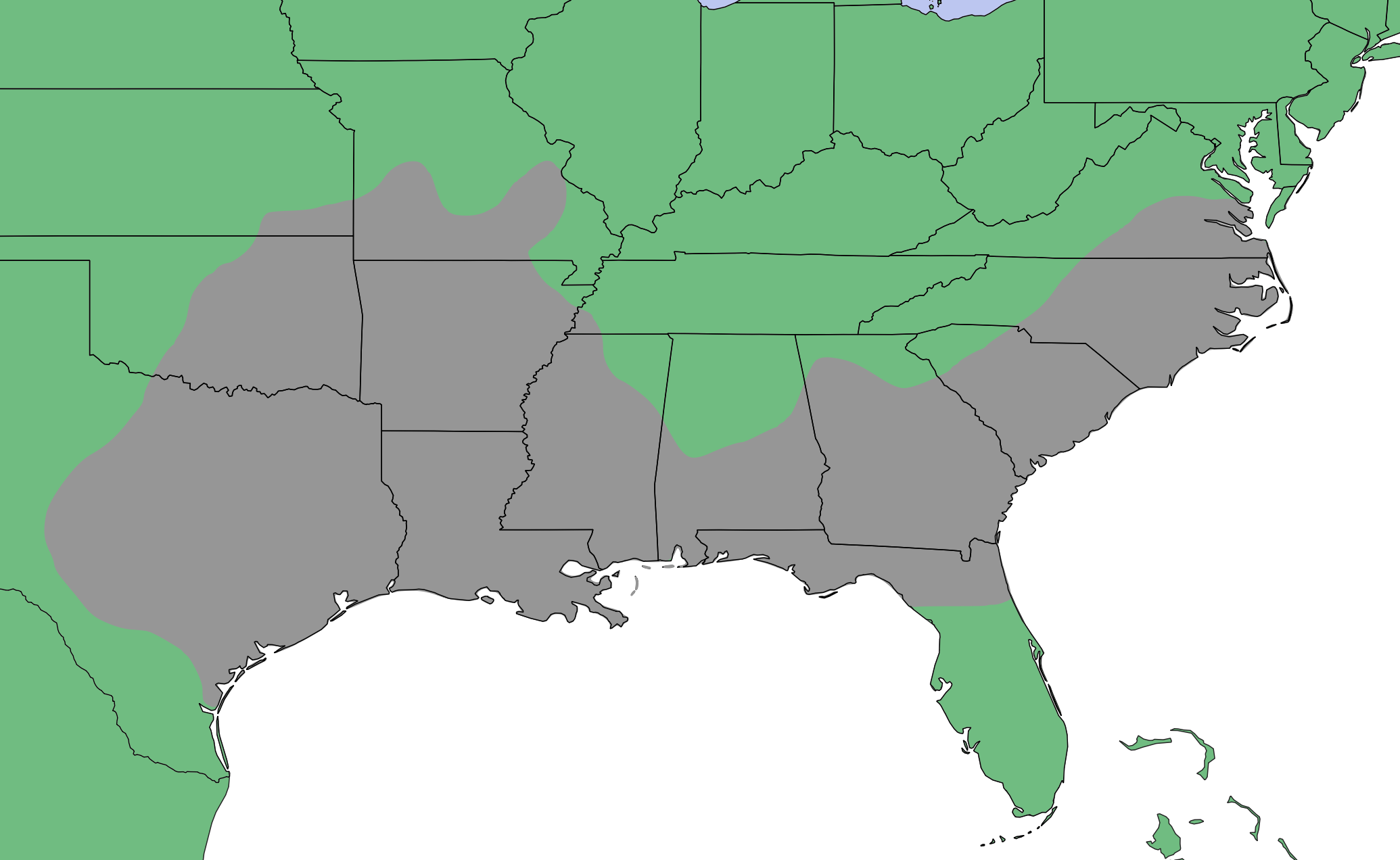

Synonyms
- Coluber striatulus Linnaeus, 1766; Natrix striatulus — Merrem, 1820; Haldea striatula — Baird & Girard, 1853; Conocephalus striatulus — A.M.C. Duméril & Bibron, 1854; Falconeria bengalensis Theobald, 1868 (fide Bauer & Das, 1999); Virginia striatula — Garman, 1884; Potamophis striatulus — Garman, 1892

= Virginia striatula =

Species of snake

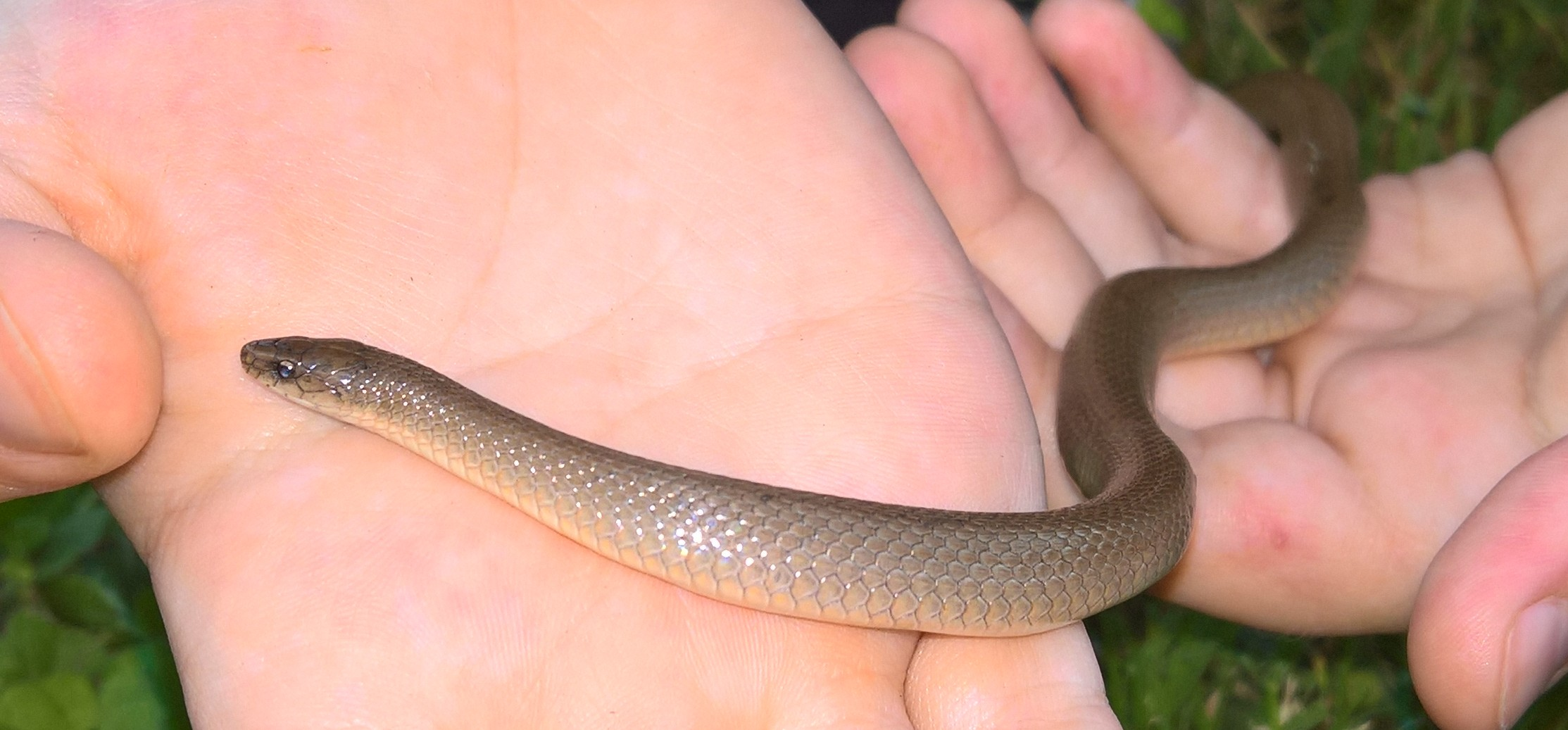

Virginia striatula (formerly Haldea striatula), commonly called the rough earth snake, is a species of nonvenomous natricine colubrid snake native to the southeasten United States.

== Taxonomy ==
The species was first described by Carl Linnaeus in 1766, as Coluber striatulus. Over the next two and a half centuries its scientific name has been changed several times (see synonyms). Most recently, the generic name was changed back again from Haldea to Virginia in 2023.

== Common names ==
Other common names for Virginia striatula include: brown ground snake, brown snake, ground snake, little brown snake, little striped snake, small brown viper, small-eyed brown snake, southern ground snake, striated viper, and worm snake.

== Geographic distribution ==
The rough earth snake is found from southern Virginia to northern Florida, west along the Gulf Coast to southern Texas, and north into south-central Missouri and southeastern Kansas. It is also present in northern parts of Oklahoma.

== Description ==
Virginia striatula is a small, harmless, secretive, fairly slender snake, 7–10 inches (18–25 cm) in total length (tail included). It has a round pupil, weakly keeled dorsal scales, and usually a divided anal plate. Dorsally, it is brown, gray, or reddish, and essentially has no pattern. Females are a little longer and heavier than males, with relatively shorter tails. Young individuals often have a light band on the neck, which is normally lost as they mature. The belly is tan to whitish and is not sharply defined in color from the back, unlike in the wormsnake (Carphophis amoenus) or the red-bellied snake (Storeria occipitomaculata). Keeled scales differentiate the rough earth snake from the similar smooth earth snake (Virginia valeriae), as well as from the wormsnake. V. striatula is most likely to be confused with De Kay's brown snake (Storeria dekayi), which is a little larger and is light brown with dark markings on the back and neck. Unlike the rough earth snake, De Kay's brown snake retains these markings into adulthood. Also, S. dekayi has a rounder snout than V. striatula.

== Habitat ==
The rough earth snake is fossorial, hiding beneath logs, rocks, or ornamental stones, in leaf litter, or in compost piles and gardens. The species is found in a variety of forested habitats with plenty of ground cover, as well as in many urban areas. It can reach very high densities in urban gardens, parks, and vacant lots.

== Reproduction ==
Virginia striatula is gonochoric. It is also viviparous, giving birth to 3 to 8 live young in mid-summer. Newborns are about 10 cm (4 inches) in total length. The young somewhat resemble the ring-necked snake (Diadophis punctatus) with a light-colored neck collar, but they are much drabber and lack a brightly-colored belly.

Many sources refer to snakes that give birth to live young as either ovoviviparous or viviparous. In reality, the distinction between these two terms is not very sharp, and the diversity of reproductive modes is better thought of as a spectrum or continuum between matrotrophy (embryonic nutrients come directly from the mother) and lecithotrophy (embryonic nutrients come mostly or completely from egg yolk). Viviparity is the most extreme form of matrotrophy, whereas oviparity is the most extreme form of lecithotrophy.

== Behavior ==
The rough earth snake is not aggressive towards humans, is not venomous, and is harmless if encountered. Although it has teeth, the rough earth snake does not bite. Its response when harassed is to remain motionless, or to try to escape. It will defecate and excrete a foul smelling musk as a defense mechanism to make itself less palatable to would-be predators. If necessary, the rough earth snake can be safely picked up by hand and relocated.

== Diet ==
Virginia striatula eats invertebrates. It feeds almost exclusively on earthworms, although slugs, snails, sow bugs, insect eggs and larvae have also been found in the stomach. V. striatula is not venomous and does not constrict prey; rather, it swallows prey without subduing it. The pointed snout of the rough earth snake helps in burrowing in moist soil where prey are found.
