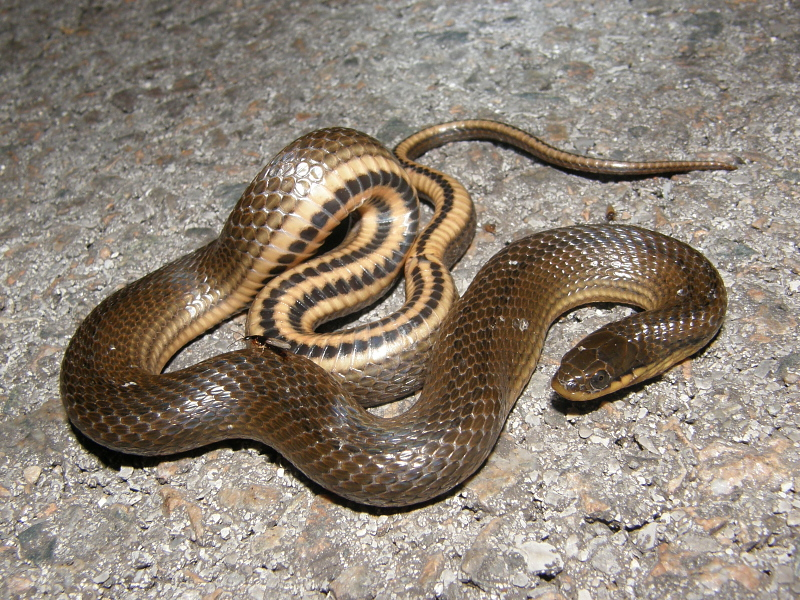
- Regina rigida sinicola in Texas

Scientific classification
- Domain: Eukaryota
- Kingdom: Animalia
- Phylum: Chordata
- Class: Reptilia
- Order: Squamata
- Suborder: Serpentes
- Family: Colubridae
- Genus: Liodytes
- Species: L. rigida
- Subspecies: L. r. sinicola

Trinomial name
- Liodytes rigida sinicola (Huheey, 1959)

Synonyms
- Natrix rigida sinicola Huheey, 1959

= Gulf crayfish snake =

Subspecies of snake

The Gulf crayfish snake (Liodytes rigida sinicola) is a subspecies of nonvenomous snake endemic to the southeastern United States.

== Description ==
It averages 20 inches (51 cm) when fully grown, with a record of 31.5 inches (80 cm). Its color is best described as chocolate brown.

== Diet ==
This subspecies feeds almost entirely on crayfish.

== Taxonomy ==
Close relatives of the Gulf crayfish snake are the glossy crayfish snake (Liodytes rigida rigida) and the Delta crayfish snake (Liodytes rigida deltae).
