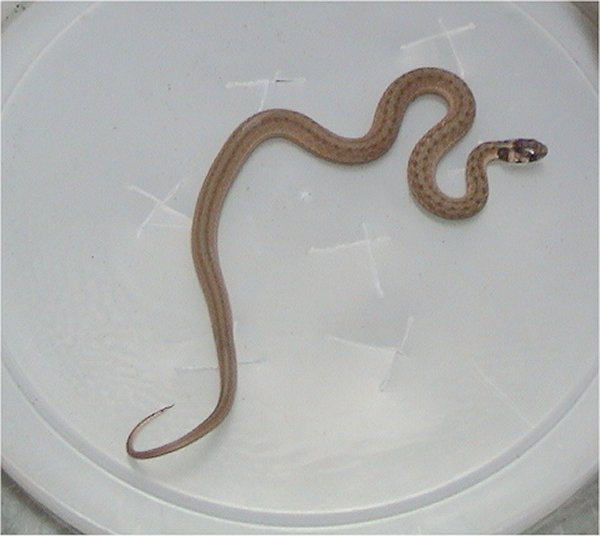
- Texas brown snake Storeria dekayi texana

Scientific classification
- Domain: Eukaryota
- Kingdom: Animalia
- Phylum: Chordata
- Class: Reptilia
- Order: Squamata
- Suborder: Serpentes
- Family: Colubridae
- Genus: Storeria
- Species: S. dekayi
- Subspecies: S. d. texana

Trinomial name
- Storeria dekayi texana Trapido, 1944

= Texas brown snake =

Subspecies of snake

The Texas brown snake (Storeria dekayi texana), a subspecies of Storeria dekayi, is a nonvenomous snake in the family Colubridae. It is endemic to North America.

== Geographic range ==
It is found from southern Minnesota to eastern Texas and northeastern Mexico.

== Description ==
Adults and young have reddish brown colored bodies with dark brown spots around the eyes. These occipital blotches are wider than in other subspecies of S. dekayi, and the fourth upper labial is usually darkened to a greater extent. S. d. texana also differs from the other subspecies by not having the anterior temporal shield marked with a black vertical bar or horizontal stripe. Adults average 30.5 cm (12.0 in) in total length, but may reach 48.3 cm (19.0 in).

== Habitat ==
They can be found in moist woodlands under logs and bark. In urban areas they are often found in gardens and flower beds, and also under old pieces of roofing or linoleum in backyards and vacant lots.

== Diet ==
They feed primarily on slugs and earthworms, but also eat insects, spiders, and cricket frogs (genus Acris).

== Reproduction ==
Storeria dekayi texana is ovoviviparous. Females bear live young in August and early September. Each young emerges in a fine tissue sac, which after bursting remains attached to the ventrum, but is quickly shed. Brood size varies from 3 to 15. The newborns measure 9–11.5 cm (3 1/2–4 1/2 in) in total length.
