= Striped crayfish snake =

Conservation status
- Least Concern (IUCN 3.1)

Scientific classification
- Kingdom: Animalia
- Phylum: Chordata
- Class: Reptilia
- Order: Squamata
- Suborder: Serpentes
- Family: Colubridae
- Genus: Liodytes
- Species: L. alleni

Binomial name
- Liodytes alleni (Garman, 1874)

Synonyms
- Helicops alleni Garman, 1874; Liodytes alleni — Cope, 1892; Helicops allenii — Boulenger, 1893; Liodytes alleni — Stejneger & Barbour, 1917; Regina alleni — Conant & Collins, 1991

Species of snake

The striped crayfish snake (Liodytes alleni) is a species of semiaquatic North American snake in the family Colubridae. The species derives its common name from its principal prey, crayfish. This snake is also called Allen's snake, the striped swamp snake, the striped swampsnake, or simply the swamp snake. It is endemic to peninsular Florida. Although rarely seen due to its secretive behavior, it can be found in large numbers in wet areas, with densities approaching 1,300 snakes per hectare (525 snakes per acre).

== Etymology ==
The specific name, alleni, is in honor of American zoologist Joel Asaph Allen, who collected the type specimen.

== Description ==
The striped crayfish snake is of "small medium" size, 33–50 centimetres (13–20 in) in total length (including tail), with a heavy body. The stripes which contribute to its common name are indistinct and located on the dark dorsal side. The ventral side is yellow with some dark spots. The dorsal scales, which are arranged in 19 rows at midbody, are smooth on the body, with some keeled scales in the anal region. There is a clear sexual dimorphism with the females being the larger sex. The striped crayfish snake is very similar to the glossy crayfish snake (Liodytes rigida rigida), but has one row of spots on the underside, whereas the glossy crayfish snake has two spots.

== Natural habitat ==
The striped crayfish snake is a semiaquatic snake and is regularly found in swamps and open wetlands with heavy plant growth, cypress swamps, saw grass prairies, swamps, and roadside ditches. The snake has adapted well to the beds of water hyacinth that has taken over many waterways. Although the species is aquatic, it is rarely seen in moving water. The snake is primarily found in Florida. It is commonly found east of the central panhandle and in southeastern Georgia. The northern range limit is near the Florida-Georgia border.

== Behavior and diet ==
The striped crayfish snake is active throughout the year except for the coldest months of winter. When active, it typically can be found among the roots of aquatic vegetation, and on land beneath logs or organic litter. It is active in still water during the day and probably at night. On cool days, it finds sunny areas on land to bask.

The striped crayfish snake feeds primarily on crayfish. It uses its coils to hold its prey while consuming it alive. Its teeth are small and very sharp, allowing it to grab and hold the hard outer covering of the crayfish. It typically swallows the crustacean tail first. Juveniles feed on insect larvae, most commonly the larvae of dragonflies and shrimp.

== Reproduction ==
There is very little known about the reproduction of the striped crayfish snake. Adults probably mate during the spring season, and the young are born alive during the late summer or autumn. Brood size is from four to twelve neonates. Larger snakes usually produce more young than smaller snakes.

== Predators and defense ==
Natural predators of L. alleni include great egrets, great blue herons, sandhill cranes, kingsnakes, cottonmouth snakes, large salamanders, red-shouldered hawks, large fishes, sirens, alligators, raccoons, and river otters. When attacked or disturbed, the striped crayfish snake escapes into the water. The snake releases a strong odor from its scent glands when captured. It does not bite, but may thrash around vigorously when captured.

== Conservation ==
Because the striped crayfish snake is dependent on a continuous and abundant supply of crayfish, any major changes to the crayfish supply, including destruction of the crayfish habitat, pollution and destruction of wetlands will be a threat to the survival of the striped crayfish snake. The species is not legally protected in Florida or George, but is considered a conservation concern.
