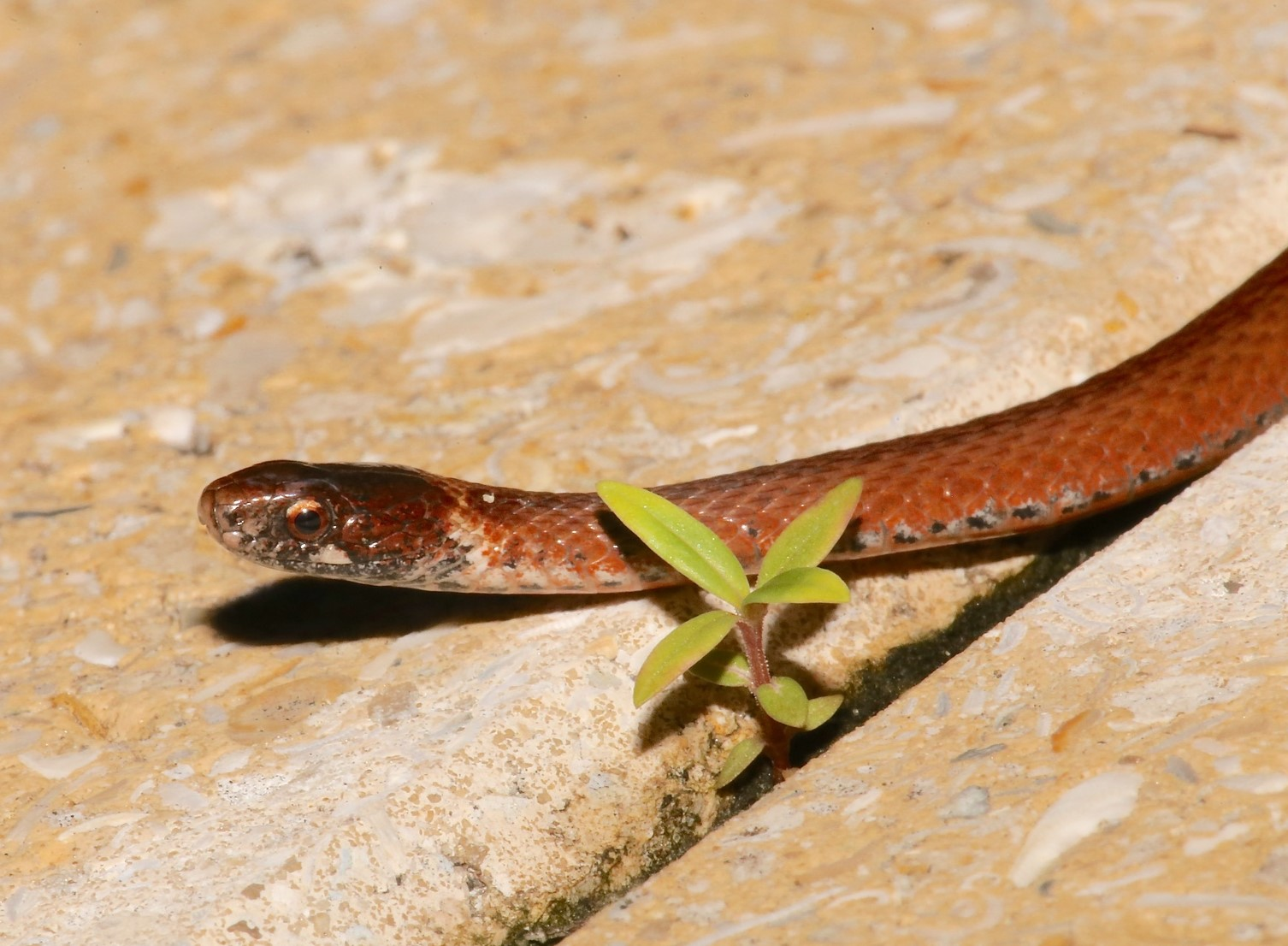

Scientific classification
- Kingdom: Animalia
- Phylum: Chordata
- Class: Reptilia
- Order: Squamata
- Suborder: Serpentes
- Family: Colubridae
- Genus: Storeria
- Species: S. occipitomaculata
- Subspecies: S. o. obscura

Trinomial name
- Storeria occipitomaculata obscura (Trapido, 1944)

= Storeria occipitomaculata obscura =

Florida redbelly snake

Subspecies of snake

Storeria occipitomaculata obscura, also known commonly as the Florida redbelly snake, is a subspecies of snake in the subfamily Natricinae of the family Colubridae. A subspecies of the redbelly snake, the Florida redbelly snake ranges from the northern peninsula to southern Florida. It is found in pinelands, bogs, marshes, ponds, and swamps. It will usually grow to a total length (tail included) of 8–10 in (20–25 cm), with the longest being 16 in (41 cm). It looks similar to the ring-necked snake because of the red belly and the ring around the neck. It is distinguishable because the Florida redbelly snake has a stripe down its back and is brown, while the ring-necked snake has no stripe and is gray.
