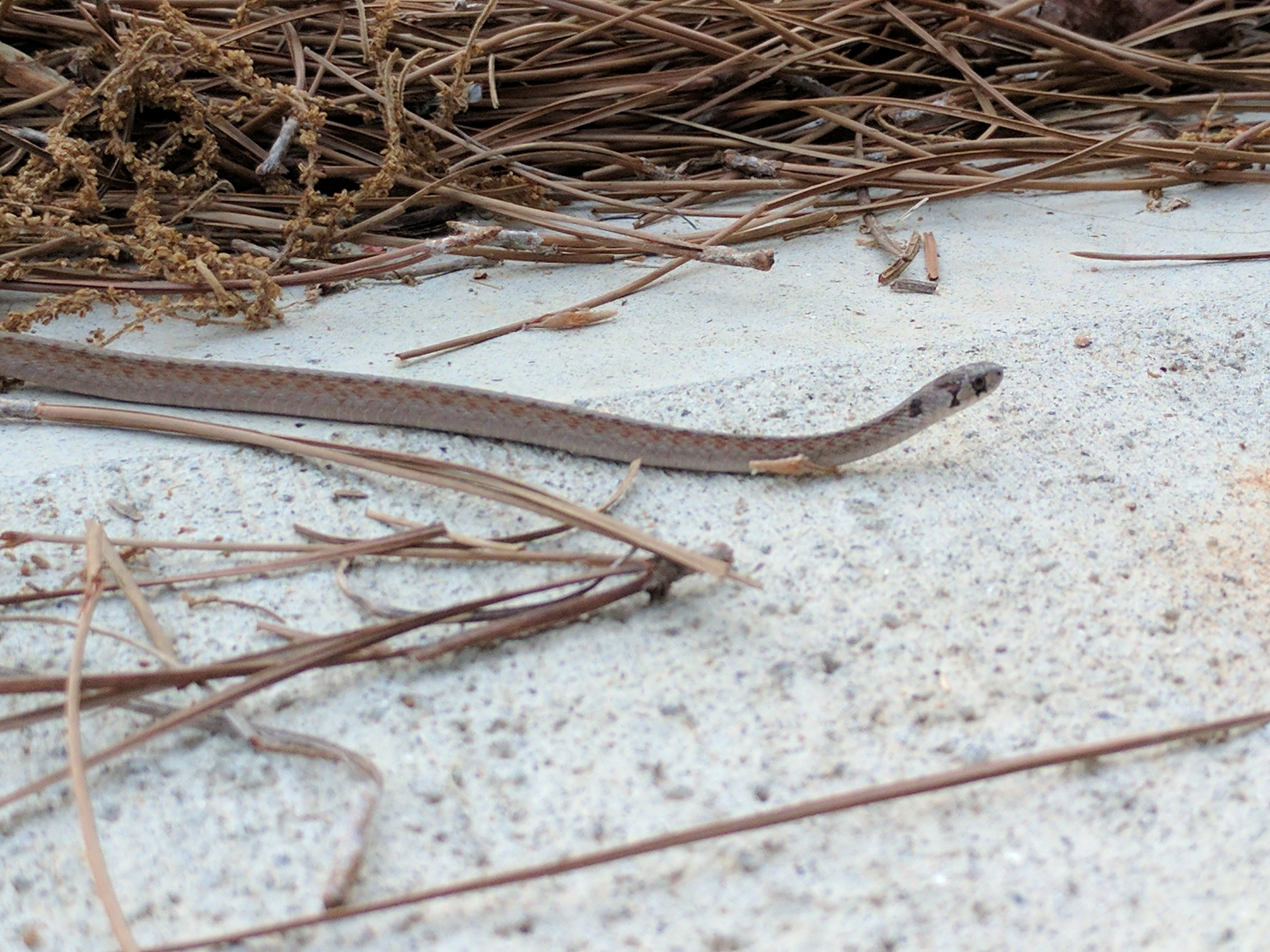

Conservation status
- Secure (NatureServe)

Scientific classification
- Kingdom: Animalia
- Phylum: Chordata
- Class: Reptilia
- Order: Squamata
- Suborder: Serpentes
- Family: Colubridae
- Genus: Storeria
- Species: S. victa

Binomial name
- Storeria victa Hay, 1892

Synonyms
- Storeria dekayi victa

= Storeria victa =

Species of snake

Storeria victa, the Florida brown snake, is a species of nonvenomous snake in the family Colubridae. It is endemic to Georgia and Florida in the United States.
