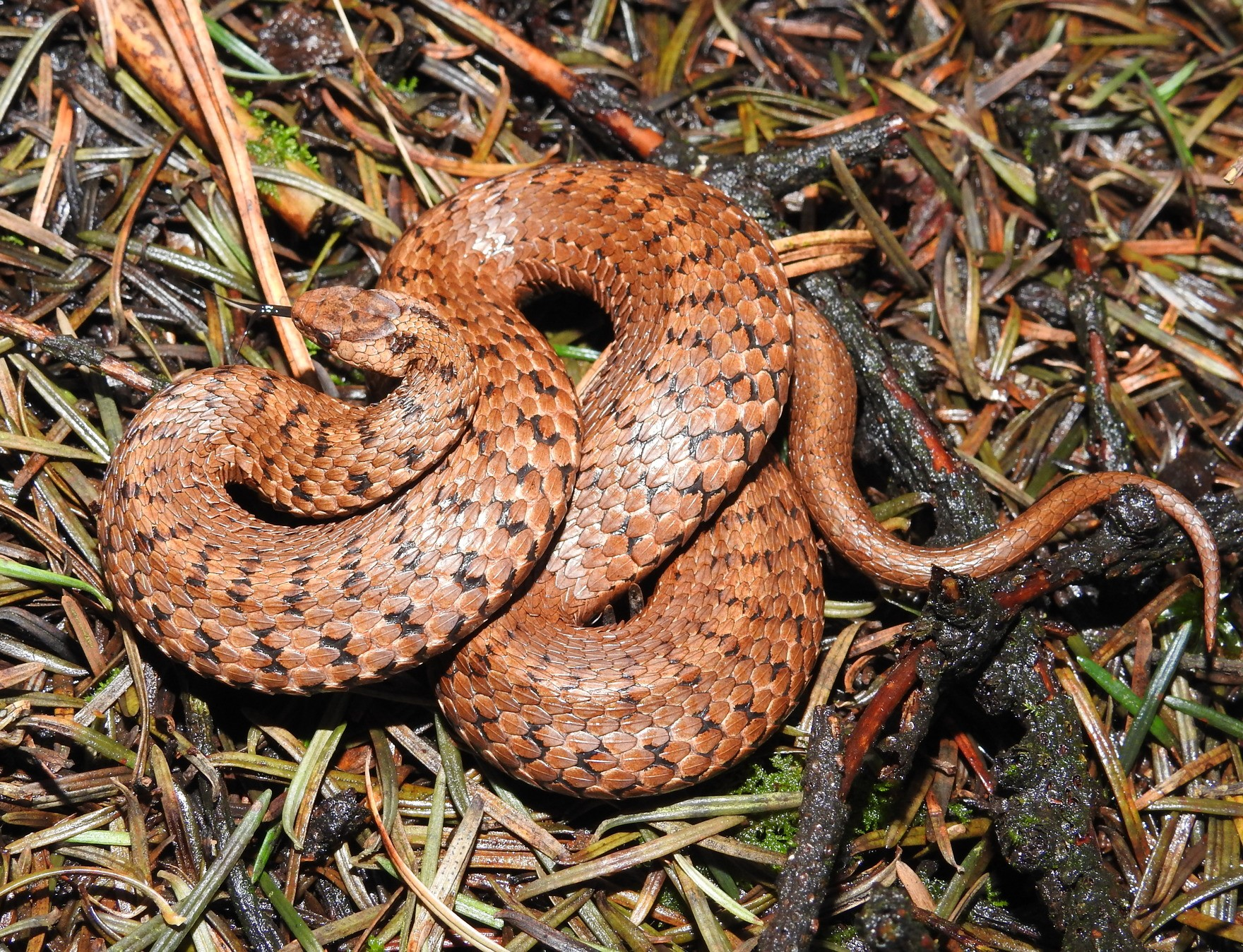

Conservation status
- Least Concern (IUCN 3.1)

Scientific classification
- Kingdom: Animalia
- Phylum: Chordata
- Class: Reptilia
- Order: Squamata
- Suborder: Serpentes
- Family: Colubridae
- Genus: Storeria
- Species: S. storerioides

Binomial name
- Storeria storerioides (Cope, 1865)

Synonyms
- Tropidoclonium storerioides Cope, 1865; Ischnognathus occipitomaculatus Fischer, 1882; Storeria storerioides Garman, 1883; Hemigenius variabilis Dugès, 1888; Natrix storerioides Cope, 1889; Ischnognathus storerioides Boulenger, 1893; Tropidonotus storerioides Bocourt, 1893; Tropidonotus variabilis Günther, 1893; Thamnopis variabilis Amaral, 1929; Tropidoclonion storerioides Dunn, 1931

= Storeria storerioides =

Species of snake

Storeria storerioides, the Mexican brown snake, is a species of nonvenomous snake in the family Colubridae. It is endemic to Mexico, and is mainly found in the western part of the Trans-Mexican Volcanic Belt. Oak and pine forests make up the snake's habitat.

== Taxonomy ==
The snake was first described under the in 1866 by Edward Drinker Cope, who placed it in the genus Tropidoclonium, known today as Tropidoclonion. Samuel Garman moved the snake to its own genus, Storeria, in 1883. The name storerioides, meaning "similar" or "like", refers to the species similarity to other species in its genus.

== Distribution and habitat ==
The snake is endemic to Mexico. It's mostly found in the western part of Trans-Mexican Volcanic Belt, and from there its range stretches northwards along the Sierra Madre Occidental, The snake inhabits pine and oak forests, and is usually found underneath logs or plant litter. having been found as far north as Madera, Chihuahua. The snake is also known to be found in Coahuila, near the border with Zacatecas.

== Description ==
Storeria storerioides have somewhat slender bodies. Most 'individuals are 26–30 centimetres (10–12 in) long, with the maximum recorded length being 32.8 cm (12.9 in) for males and 34 cm (13 in) for females. The tail usually makes up a little over a fifth of the total length. The back is coloured in a variable shade of brown, with dark brown to black markings forming horizontal bars along the length of the body, usually more than 50 in total. The belly is coloured salmon to orange-red and is dotted with dark spots. The head is coloured brown with small dark markings, and behind the head are a pair of dark occipital markings stretching about three scales down the back.
