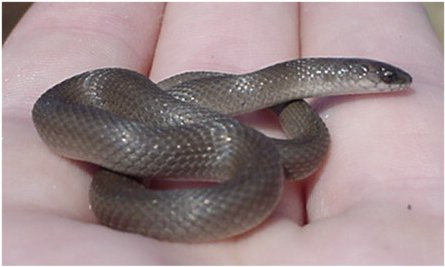
- Virginia striatula, rough earth snake

Scientific classification
- Kingdom: Animalia
- Phylum: Chordata
- Class: Reptilia
- Order: Squamata
- Suborder: Serpentes
- Family: Colubridae
- Subfamily: Natricinae
- Genus: Virginia; Baird & Girard, 1853

Synonyms
- Amphiardis; Calamaria; Celuta; Coluber; Conocephalus; Falconeria; Haldea; Natrix; Potamophis

= Virginia (snake) =

Genus of reptiles

Virginia is a genus of small, terrestrial snakes in the subfamily Natricinae of the family Colubridae. The genus is native to the United States. Species in the genus are commonly referred to as earth snakes.

== Species ==
There are two species assigned to this genus. However the subspecies Virginia valeriae pulchra is listed as the species Virginia pulchra in some sources:

- Virginia striatula Linnaeus, 1766
- Virginia valeriae Baird & Girard, 1853

== Geographic distribution ==
- Virginia striatula – southeastern United States, from Oklahoma and Texas to North Carolina and Florida.
- Virginia valeriae – eastern half of the United States, from Iowa and Texas to Pennsylvania and Florida.

The geographic ranges of the two species overlap; it is unknown if hybridization occurs.

== Description ==
Virginia species are small snakes, ranging in size from 7–10 in (18–25 cm) in total length (tail included). They are brown-colored, with a lighter cream-colored underside. Many individuals also have small black spots on the back and sides. Differentiating species can be difficult, but V. valeriae has smooth scales, whereas V. striatula has keeled scales. Females are typically longer and heavier than males, but have relatively shorter tails.

== Habitat ==
Virginia species are fossorial species found in hardwood hammocks and pine flatwoods. They are most often found buried in loose soil, under rotting logs, or in leaf litter.

== Diet and behavior ==
Earth snakes eat earthworms and soft bodied arthropods. Prey is typically grasped and then swallowed alive.
