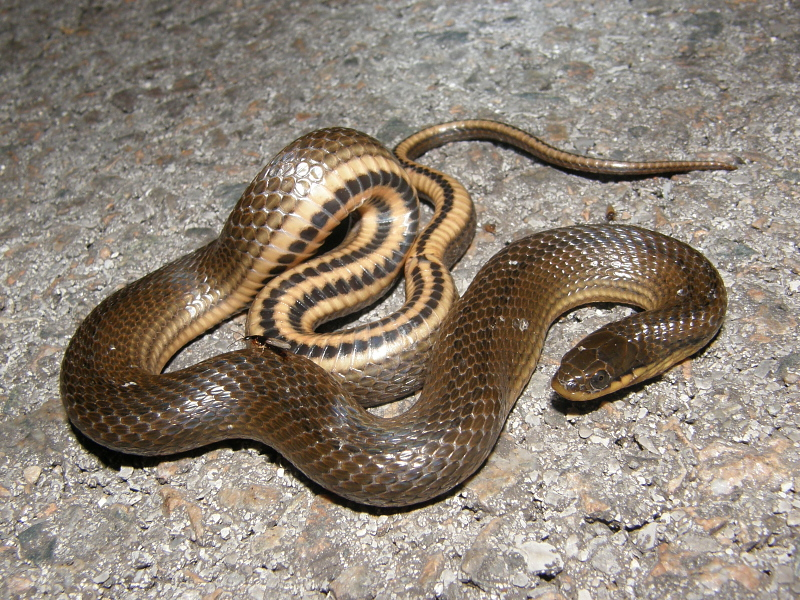
- Gulf crayfish snake (Liodytes r. sinicola)

Conservation status
- Least Concern (IUCN 3.1)

Scientific classification
- Kingdom: Animalia
- Phylum: Chordata
- Class: Reptilia
- Order: Squamata
- Suborder: Serpentes
- Family: Colubridae
- Genus: Liodytes
- Species: L. rigida

Binomial name
- Liodytes rigida (Say, 1825)
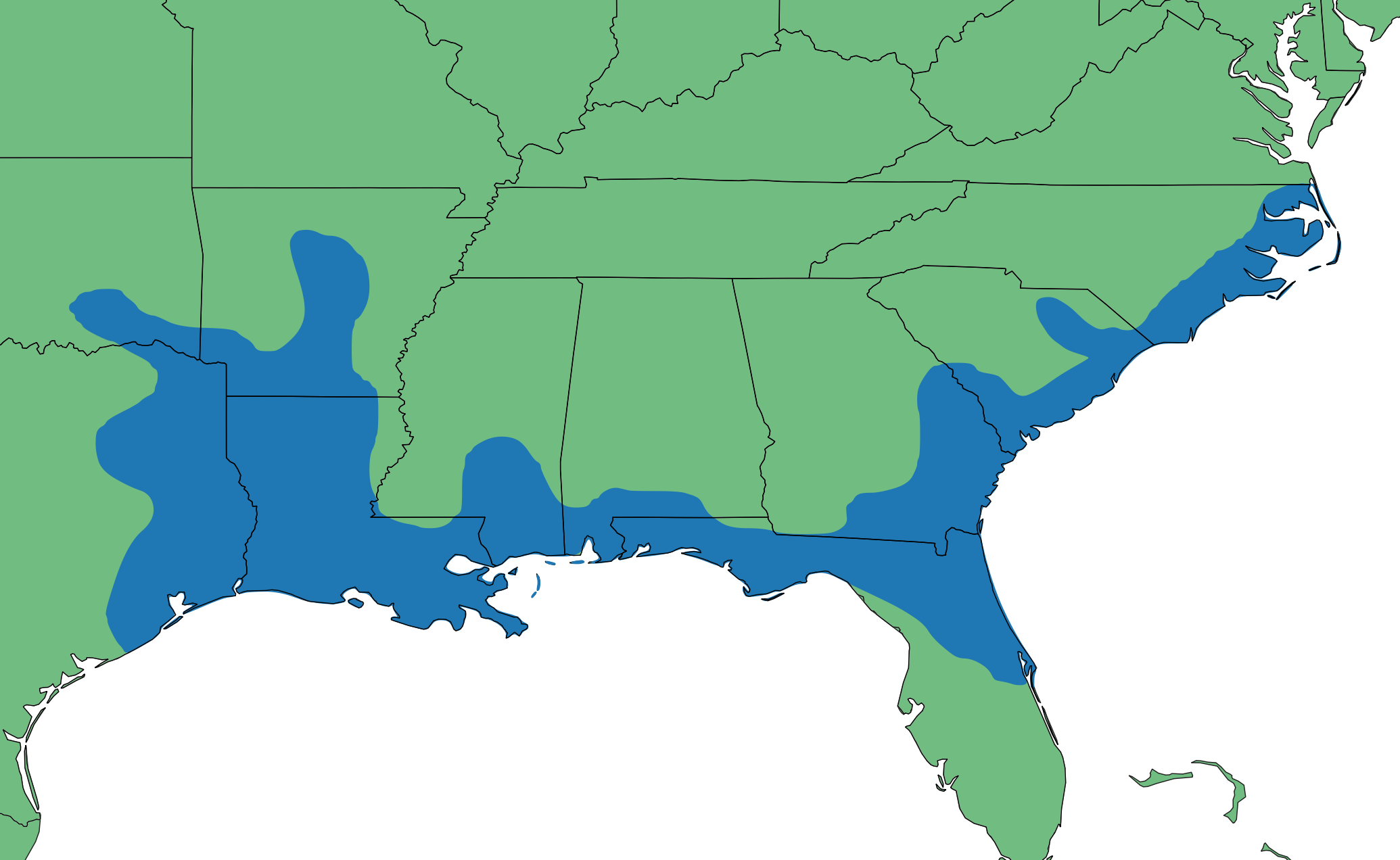

Synonyms
- Coluber rigidus Say, 1825; Tropidonotus rigidus — Holbrook, 1842; Regina rigida — Baird & Girard, 1853; Natrix rigida — Cope, 1892; Nerodia rigida — Conant, 1978; Liodytes rigida — Price, 1983

= Crayfish snake =

Species of snake

The crayfish snake (Liodytes rigida), also known commonly as the glossy crayfish snake, the glossy swampsnake, the glossy water snake, and the striped water snake, is a species of semiaquatic snake in the subfamily Natricinae of the family Colubridae. The species is endemic to the southeastern United States, and preys mainly on crayfish.

== Geographic range ==
L. rigida is found on the coastal plains of both the Atlantic Coast and the Gulf Coast: in eastern Texas, southeastern Oklahoma, southern Arkansas, Louisiana, southern Mississippi, southern Alabama, northern Florida, southern Georgia, eastern South Carolina, and southeastern North Carolina. There is also a disjunct population in eastern Virginia.

== Description ==
Adults of L. rigida are on average 16 inches (about 41 cm) in total length (including tail), and are heavy-bodied. The maximum recorded total length for this species is 31 3/8 inches (80 cm).

L. rigida is olive brown dorsally. Additionally, two blackish dorsal stripes may or may not be present. The upper lips (labial scales) are yellow. Ventrally, it is yellow with two parallel series of black spots, which merge anteriorly into a single series. The ventral surface of the tail may have a median black line, or it may be unmarked.

The dorsal scales are arranged in 19 rows at midbody. They are strongly keeled, except for the first two rows. The first row (adjacent to the ventrals) is smooth, and the second row is weakly keeled. The ventrals number 132-142. The anal plate is divided. The subcaudals number 51-71, and are divided.

== Diet ==
L. rigida eats crayfish.

== Reproduction ==
L. rigida is viviparous.

== Subspecies ==
Three subspecies of L. rigida are recognized as being valid, including the nominotypical subspecies.

- Liodytes rigida deltae (Huheey, 1959) – Delta crayfish snake
- Liodytes rigida rigida (Say, 1825) – glossy crayfish snake
- Liodytes rigida sinicola (Huheey, 1959) – Gulf crayfish snake

Nota bene: A trinomial authority in parentheses indicates that the subspecies was originally described in a genus other than Liodytes.
