= Glossy crayfish snake =

Scientific classification
- Kingdom: Animalia
- Phylum: Chordata
- Class: Reptilia
- Order: Squamata
- Suborder: Serpentes
- Family: Colubridae
- Genus: Liodytes
- Species: L. rigida
- Subspecies: L. r. rigida

Trinomial name
- Liodytes rigida rigida (Say, 1825)

Subspecies of snake

The glossy crayfish snake (Liodytes rigida rigida) is a subspecies of nonvenomous snake endemic to the southeastern United States. Its scientific name, rigida, derives from the fact that it is comparatively stiff.

== Description ==
It is a shiny, dark semiaquatic snake, usually measuring 14-24 inches (36–61 cm). Its color can be described as brown to olive brown. A few dark stripes are present on the snake's back, but hardly noticeable. The bottom of the snake is a cream-yellowish color, with small patterns similar to half-moons. It can be described as very stiff, which has earned it the nickname, "the stiff snake". This snake also has very rough scales, thought to aid in defence against its main food source, crayfish.

== Diet ==
This subspecies feeds almost entirely on crayfish. However, when their main food source is scarce, they can resort to frogs, salamanders, small fish, and dragonfly larva. This snake, like other crayfish snakes, have an eating habit that is different from typical snakes. As most snakes attack the head of their prey, crayfish snakes will attack the rear of the crayfish, to prevent internal damage from the sharp parts of the crayfish.

== Taxonomy ==
Close relatives of the glossy crayfish snake are the Gulf crayfish snake (Liodytes rigida sinicola) and the Delta crayfish snake (Liodytes rigida deltae).

== Geographic range ==
The glossy crayfish snake is found in the Coastal Plain of the southeastern United States from eastern Virginia to eastern Texas but is absent from the southern portion of peninsular Florida.

== Conservation ==
According to the Virginia Department of Game and Inland Fisheries, in Virginia the range of the glossy crayfish snake is limited to a small geographic region. The Virginia Herpetological Society indicated that "Extinction or extirpation is possible. Populations of these species are in decline or have declined to low levels or are in a restricted range."
