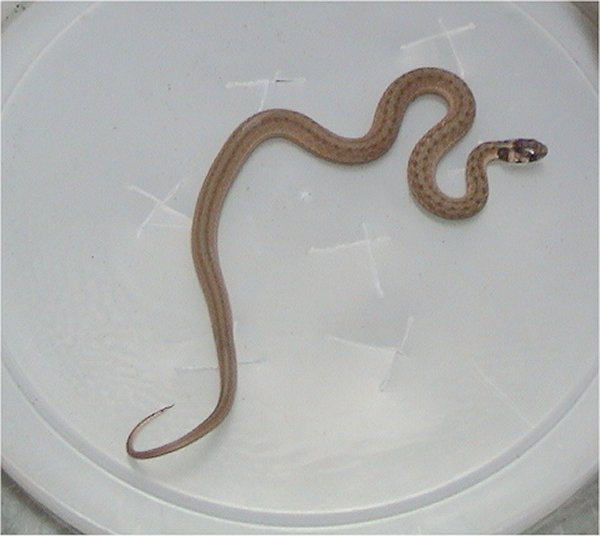
- Texas brown snake, Storeria dekayi texana

Scientific classification
- Kingdom: Animalia
- Phylum: Chordata
- Class: Reptilia
- Order: Squamata
- Suborder: Serpentes
- Family: Colubridae
- Subfamily: Natricinae
- Genus: Storeria; Baird & Girard, 1853

Synonyms
- Coluber, Ischnognathe, Ischnognathus, Tropidonotus

= Storeria =

Genus of snakes

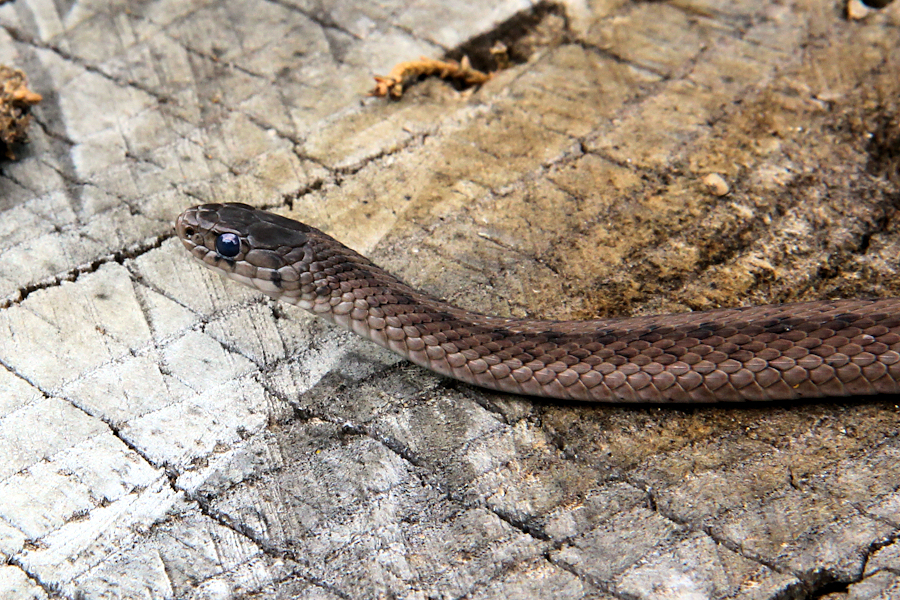
North American brown snake

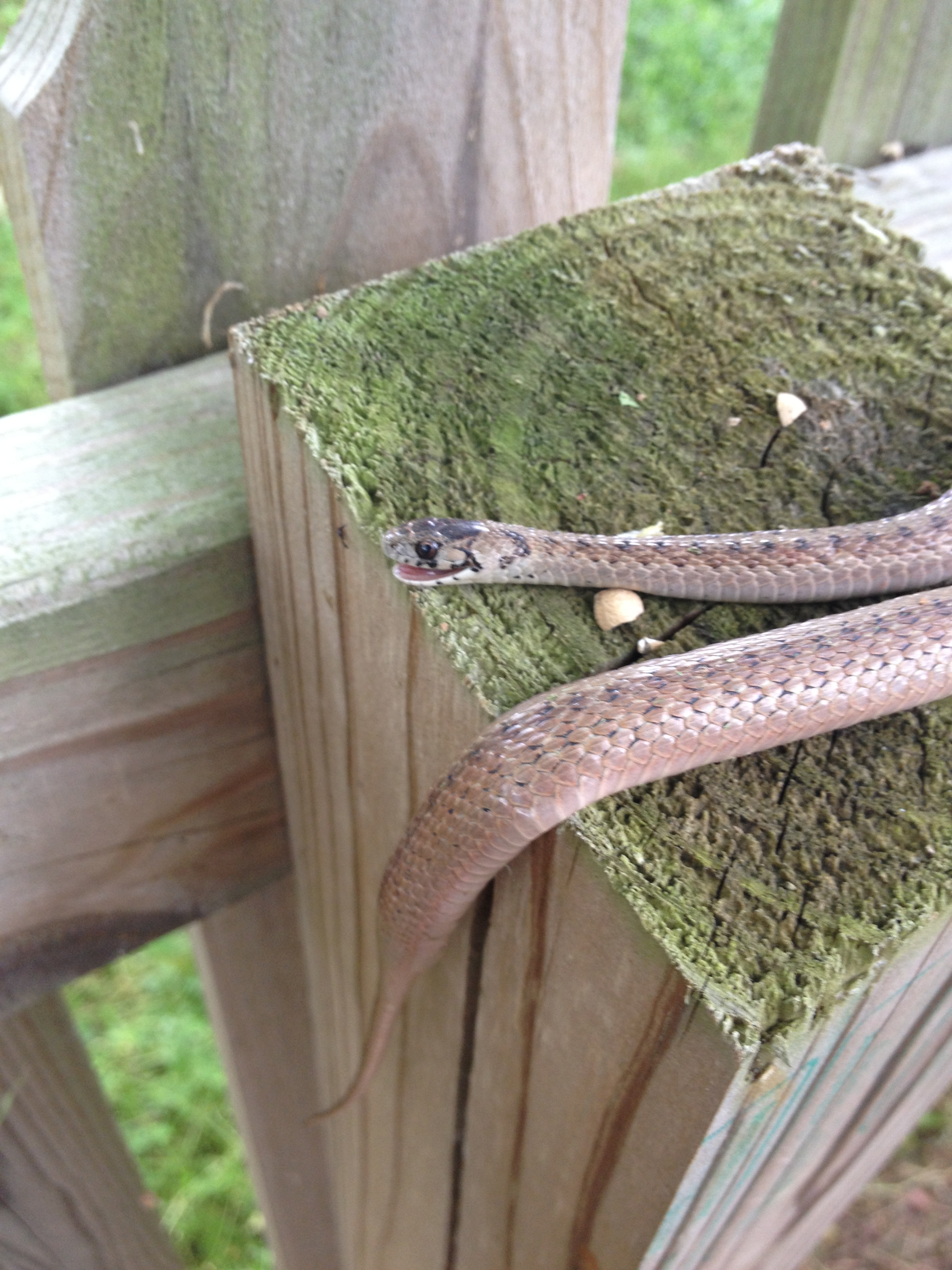
A brown snake in Clarksville, Tennessee

Storeria is a genus of snakes in the subfamily Natricinae of the family Colubridae. The genus is endemic to North America and Central America. The genus consists of five species, four of which are known as brown snakes, and one of which is known as the redbelly snake. These snakes, which are non-venomous, are not to be confused with highly venomous Australian brown snakes from the genus Pseudonaja.

== Geographic range ==
Species in the genus Storeria are found in the eastern half of the United States and southern Canada and range south through Mexico and northern Central America.

== Etymology ==
The genus is named in honor of American physician and naturalist David Humphreys Storer (1804–1891).

== Description ==
As their common names imply, most snakes of the genus Storeria are a variant of brown in color. The brown can vary depending on locale, to be almost a brick red in color, to nearly black. They sometimes have a lighter-colored stripe down the center of the back, and small black blotches along the body, and just behind the head. The underside is usually lighter brown-colored, yellow, or in the case of the redbelly snake, reddish in color. They rarely grow beyond 13 in (33 cm) in total length (including tail). One of the best means of identification is by scalation. The dorsal scales are keeled, the head has no loreal scale, and the postnasal scale touches the preocular scale. So, only two scales are between the nasal opening and the eye. Sexually mature males will reach a SVL of 118 mm and females will reach 126 mm.

== Ecology ==
Within their ranges, brown snakes are a very commonly found species of snake. They are most frequently found under leaf litter or debris piles, and are sometimes turned up during gardening. They will also be found under rocks, along riversides, and ravines. They are a species that tends to stay near moist environments that have high amounts of earthworm beds. They consume a variety of invertebrate prey, including earthworms, snails and slugs. Their only means of defense are flattening of the body and excretion from the anal scent glands. Brown snakes give birth to live young.

== Species and subspecies ==
- Storeria dekayi (Holbrook, 1836) – brown snake
  - Storeria dekayi anomala Dugès, 1888
  - Storeria dekayi dekayi (Holbrook, 1836) – northern brown snake
  - Storeria dekayi limnetes Anderson, 1961 – marsh brown snake
  - Storeria dekayi temporalineata Trapido, 1944
  - Storeria dekayi texana Trapido, 1944 – Texas brown snake
  - Storeria dekayi tropica Cope, 1885
  - Storeria dekayi wrightorum Trapido, 1944 – midland brown snake
- Storeria hidalgoensis Taylor, 1942 – Mexican yellowbelly brown snake
- Storeria occipitomaculata (Storer, 1839) – redbelly snake
  - Storeria occipitomaculata obscura Trapido, 1944 – Florida redbelly snake
  - Storeria occipitomaculata occipitomaculata (Storer, 1839) – northern redbelly snake
  - Storeria occipitomaculata pahasapae H.M. Smith, 1963 – Black Hills redbelly snake
- Storeria storerioides (Cope, 1866) – Mexican brown snake
- Storeria victa O.P. Hay, 1892 – Florida brown snake

Nota bene: A binomial authority or trinomial authority in parentheses indicates that the species or subspecies was originally described in a genus other than Storeria.

== Gallery ==
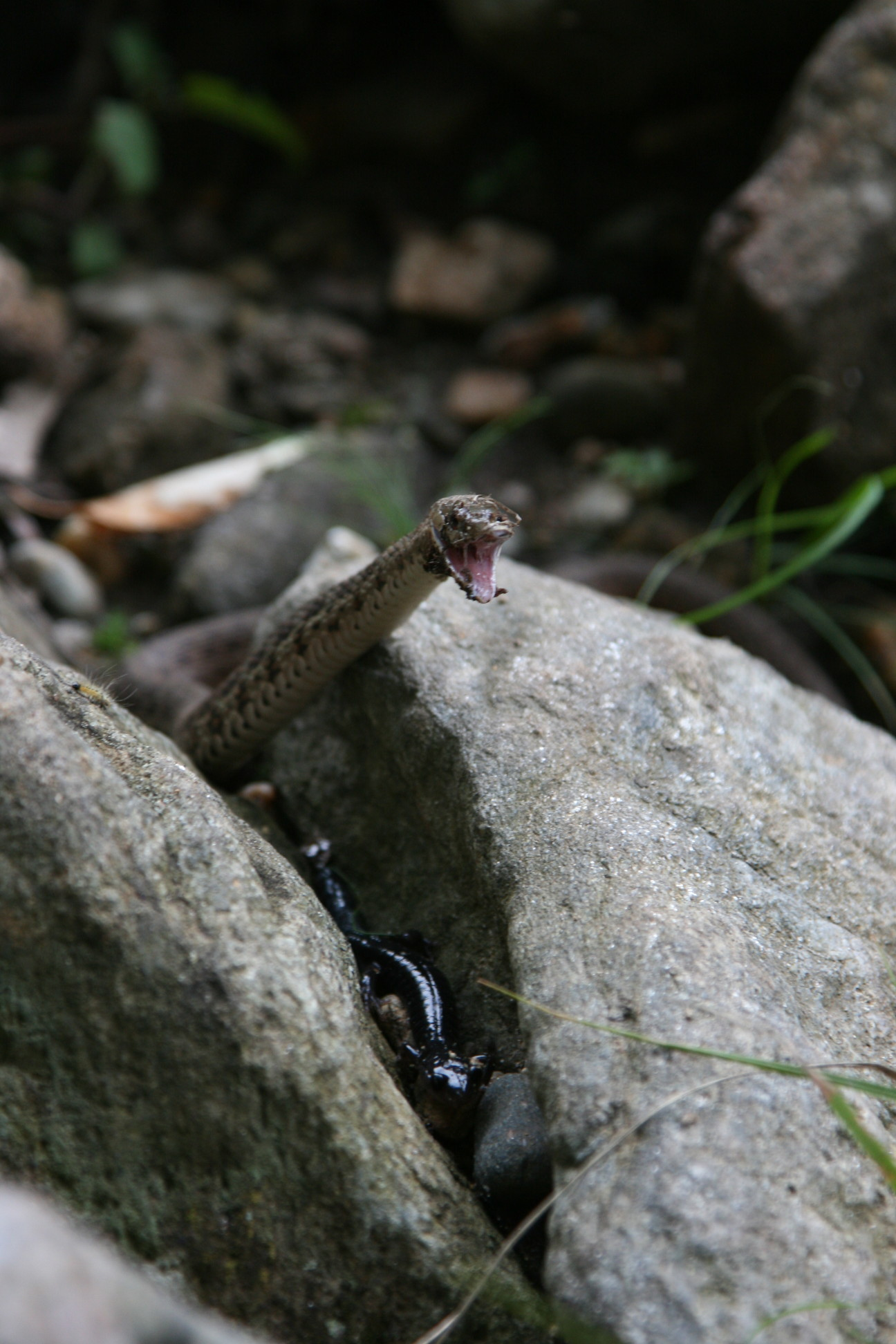

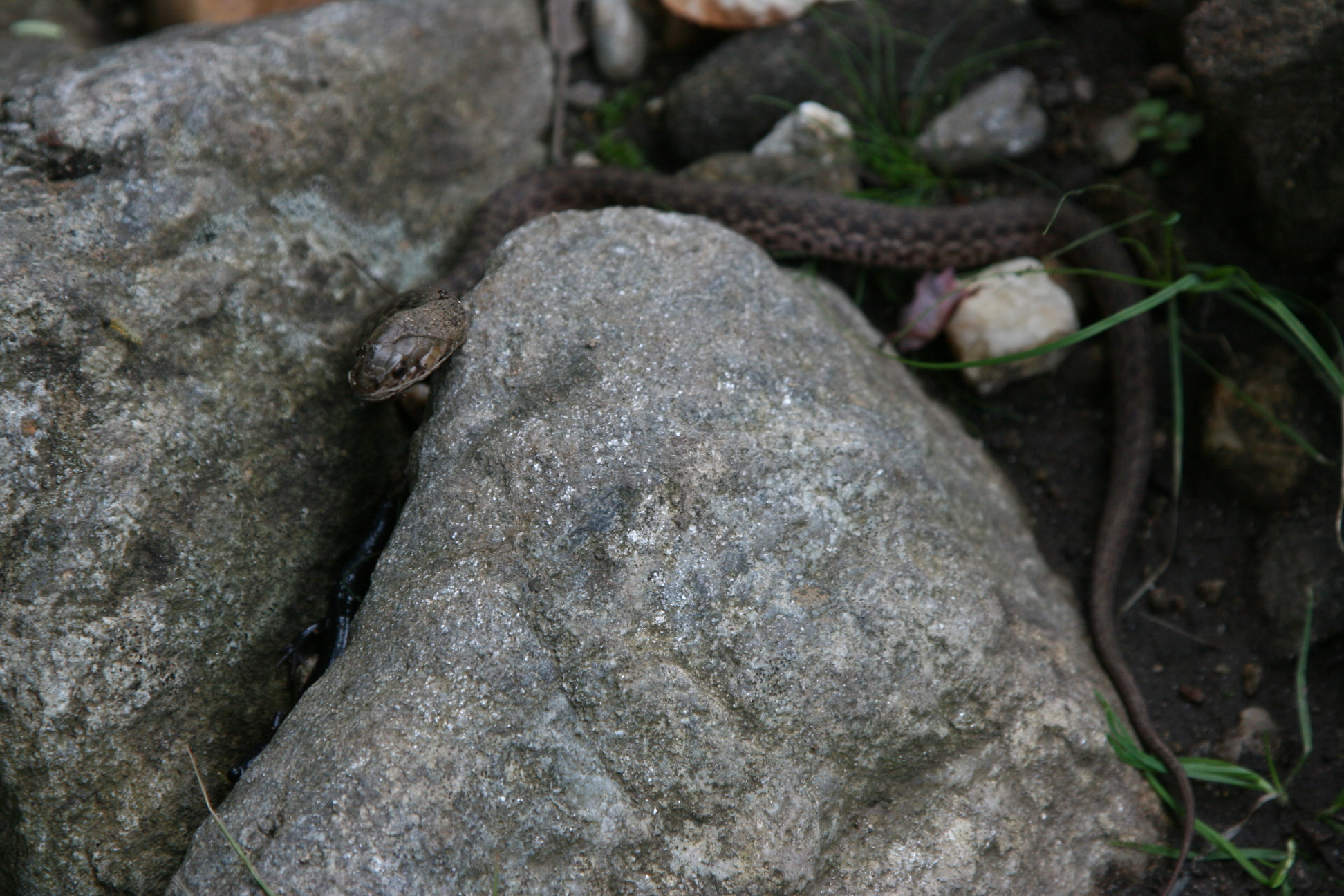

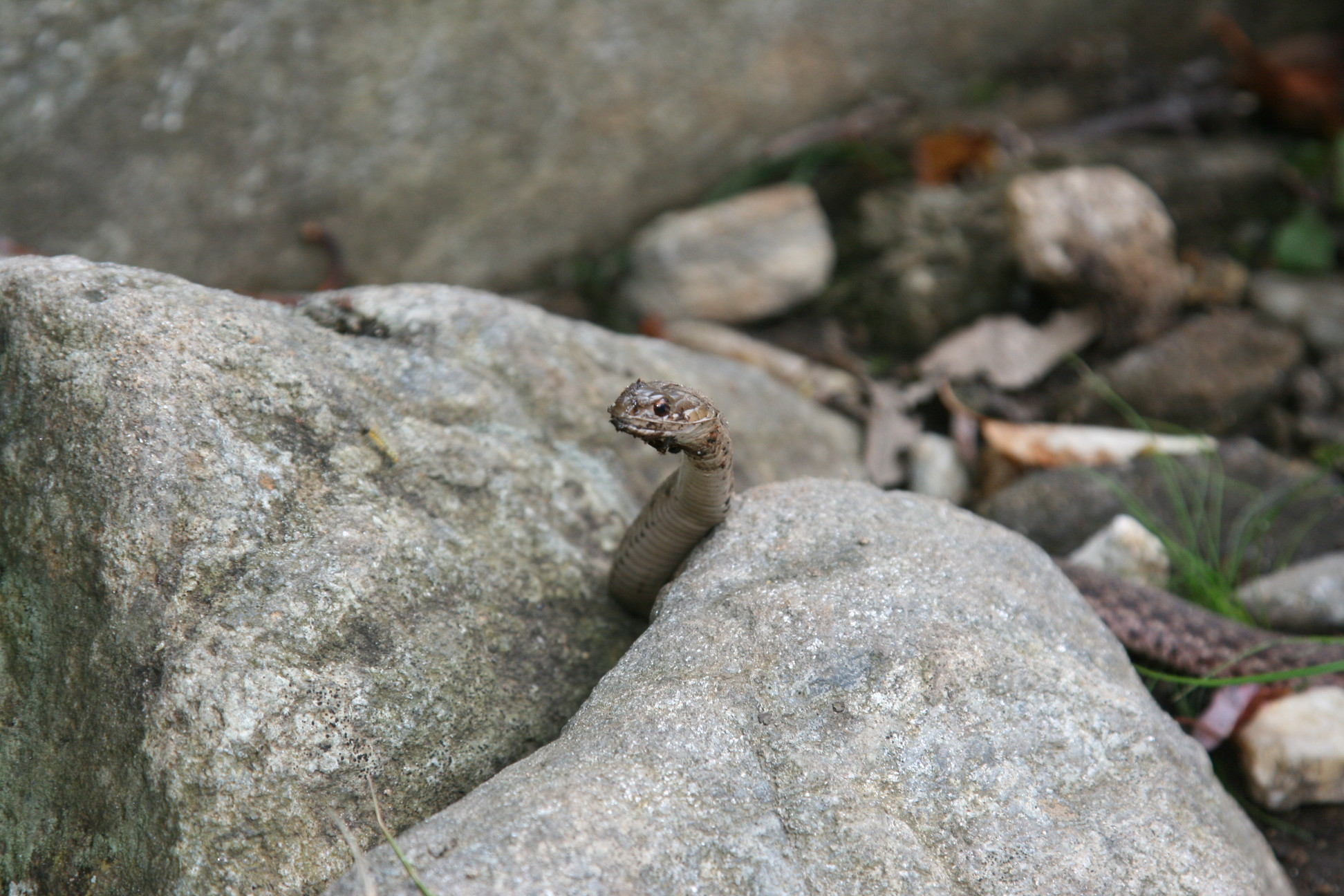

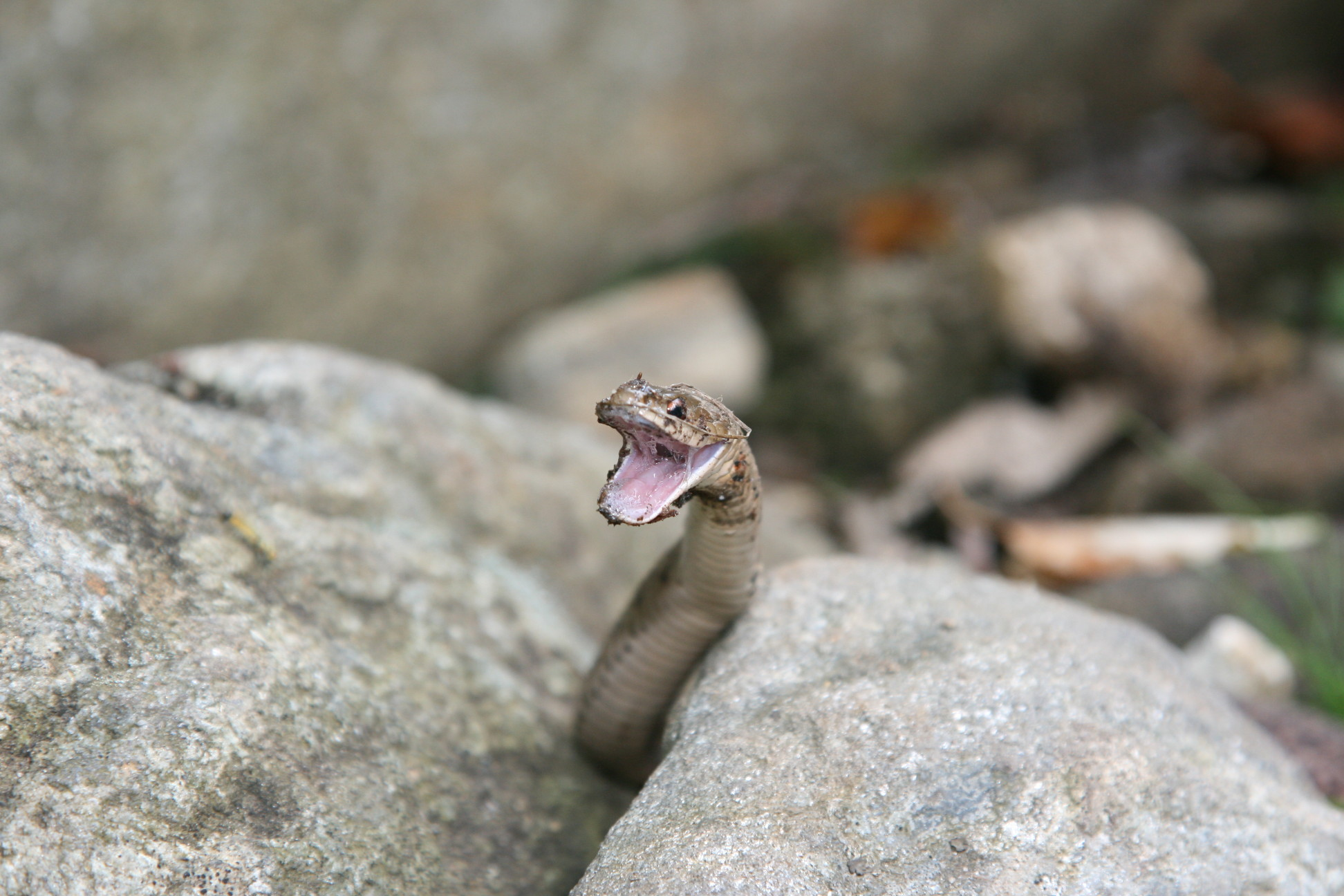

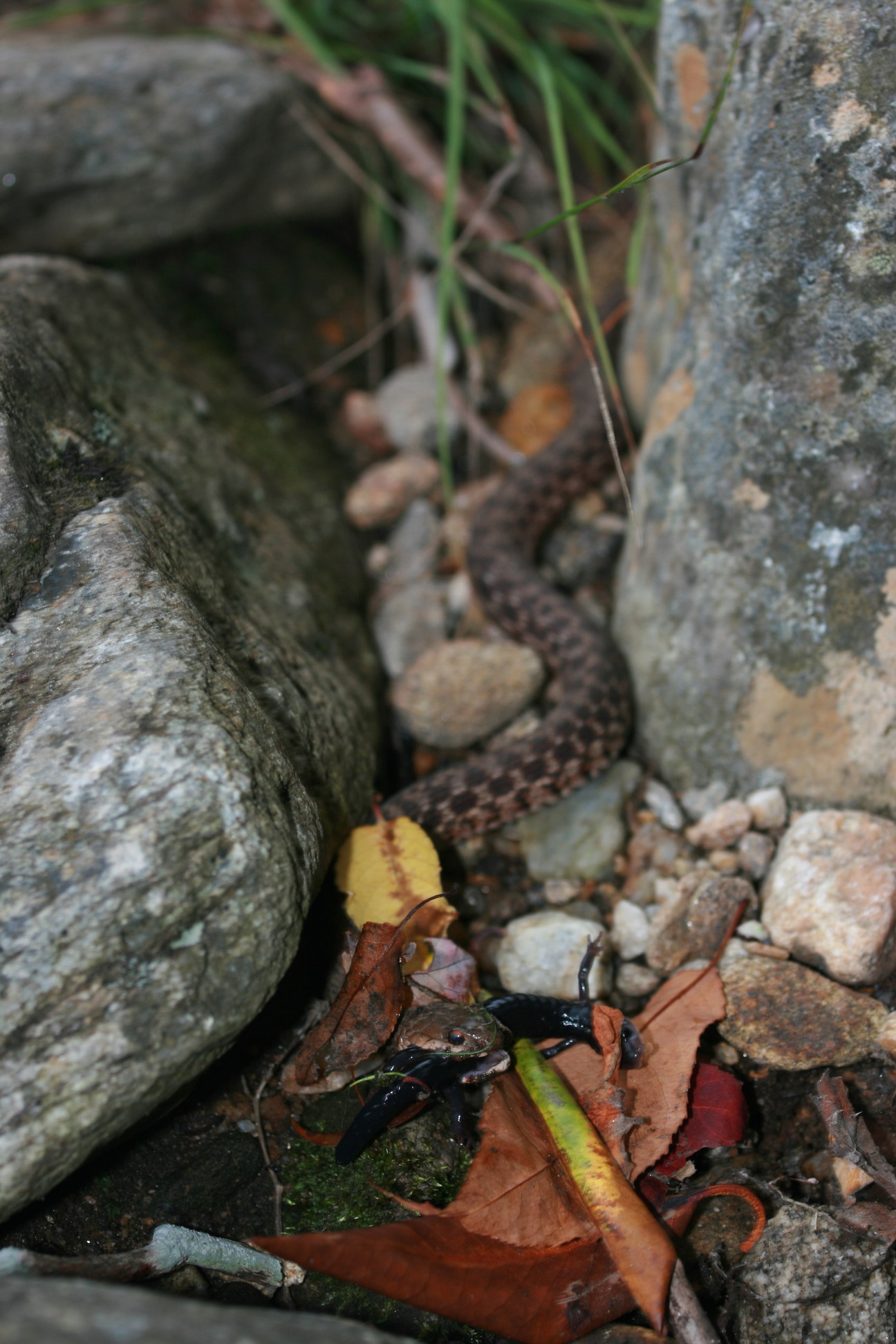

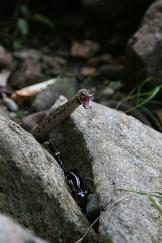
