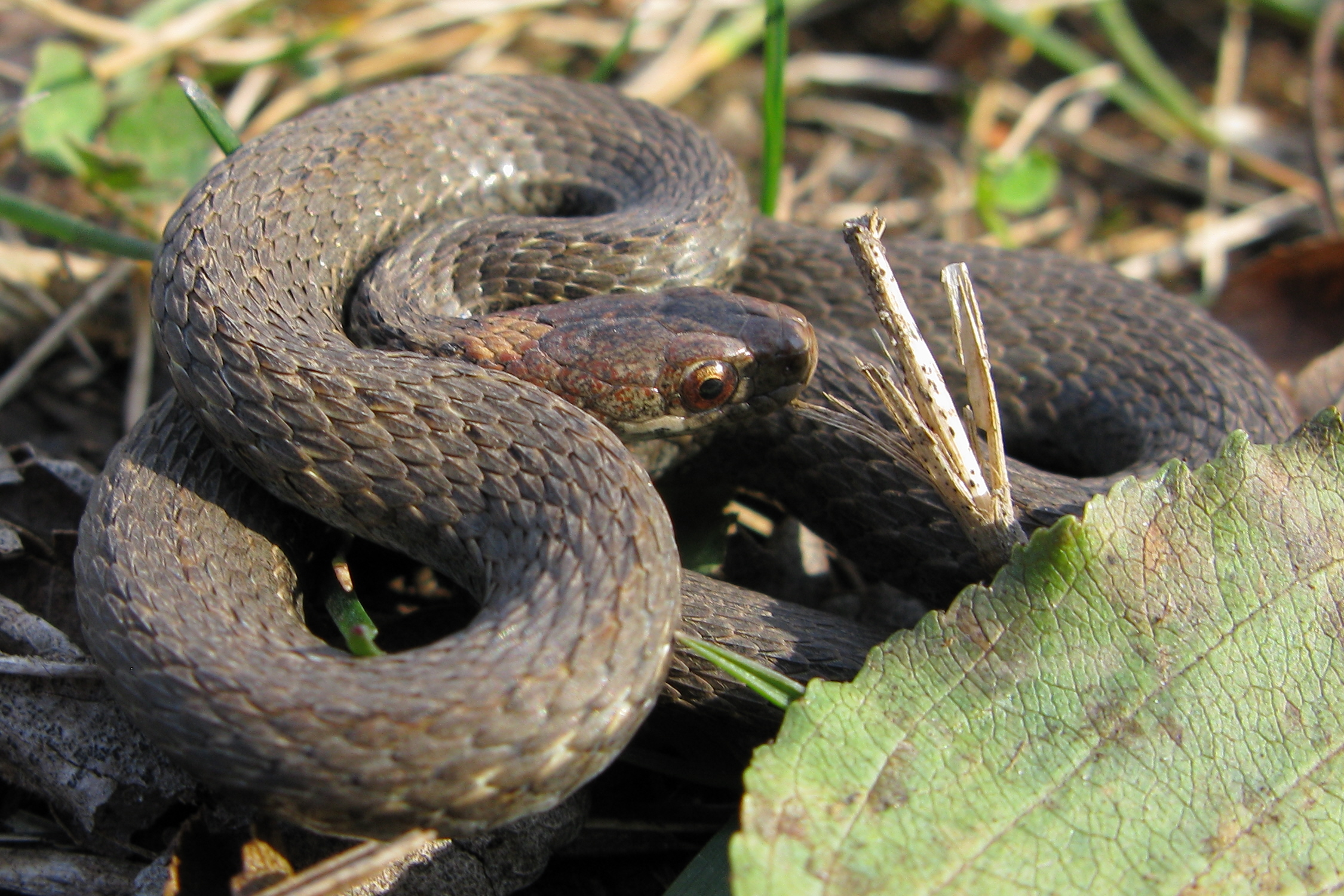

Scientific classification
- Domain: Eukaryota
- Kingdom: Animalia
- Phylum: Chordata
- Class: Reptilia
- Order: Squamata
- Suborder: Serpentes
- Family: Colubridae
- Genus: Storeria
- Species: S. occipitomaculata
- Subspecies: S. o. occipitomaculata

Trinomial name
- Storeria occipitomaculata occipitomaculata (Storer, 1839)

Synonyms
- Coluber occipitomaculatus Storer, 1839; Storeria occipitomaculata — Baird & Girard, 1853; Ischnognathus occipitomaculatus — Günther, 1858

= Northern redbelly snake =

Subspecies of snake

The northern redbelly snake (Storeria occipitomaculata occipitomaculata) is a nonvenomous snake in the family Colubridae, a subspecies of Storeria occipitomaculata. It is native to North America.

== Geographic range ==
S. o. occipitomaculata is found in the central and northeastern United States and in adjacent southeastern Canada. Redbelly snakes are found throughout eastern North America west to the eastern borders of Oklahoma, Kansas, and South Dakota. In the north, the range extends farther west into eastern North Dakota and farther west still through southern Manitoba and eastern Saskatchewan.

== Description ==
Adults and young of S. o. occipitomaculata have known dorsal colorations of solid olive-brown, tan-brown, chestnut-brown, grey-brown, grey or even black. They have three yellow spots posterior to the head shields, to which the specific name occipitomaculata (meaning spotted back of the head) refers. The underside is coral-red to brick-red. Coloration is usually made up of three different shades forming a striped pattern. Like all species of the genus Storeria, the northern redbelly snake has keeled dorsal scales and no loreal scale. Some specimens have been found with three black dots on the top of the head. Adults grow to 20–28 cm (7.9–11.0 in) in total length.

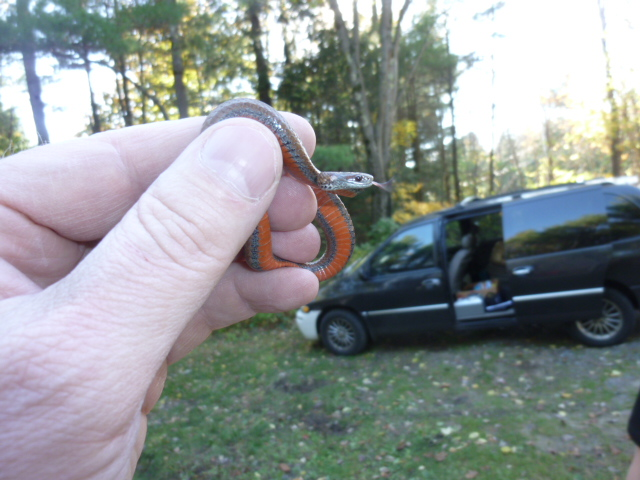
Northern redbelly snake

== Habitat ==
The northern redbelly snake lives in moist flowerbeds, gardens, and moist woodlands, such as borders between forest and wetlands. It often rests under logs and rocks near a woods or forest. Redbelly snakes are known to occur in wet meadows, woodlands, and forest-meadow edge habitats.

== Diet ==
S. o. occipitomaculata preys primarily on slugs and earthworms. The habitat they are found in supports slugs, snails, earthworms, and insect larvae, which are thought to make up the majority of the diet of redbelly snakes.

== Reproduction ==
The northern redbelly snake gives birth to live young. Each newborn measures about 7.1–11 centimetres (2.8–4.3 in) in total length.

== In captivity ==
S. o. occipitomaculata is known to live up to four years in captivity. They will not attempt to bite when handled, but may curl back their upper "lip", and may emit musk from glands at the base of the tail.
