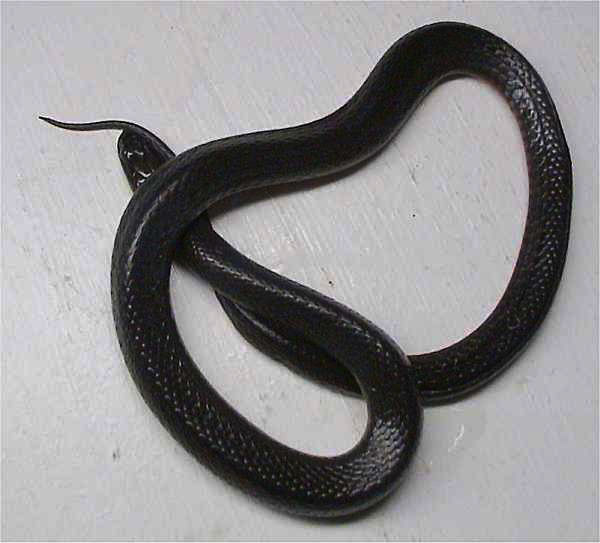
- L. pygaea

Scientific classification
- Kingdom: Animalia
- Phylum: Chordata
- Class: Reptilia
- Order: Squamata
- Suborder: Serpentes
- Family: Colubridae
- Subfamily: Natricinae
- Genus: Liodytes; Cope, 1885

Species
- Liodytes alleni Liodytes pygaea Liodytes rigida

= Liodytes =

Genus of snakes

Liodytes is a genus of snakes in the subfamily Natricinae of the family Colubridae. The genus contains three species.

== Geographic range ==
All species of the genus Liodytes are endemic to the southeastern United States.

== Species ==
The following species are recognized as being valid.

- Liodytes alleni (Garman, 1874) – striped crayfish snake
- Liodytes pygaea (Cope, 1871) – black swamp snake
- Liodytes rigida (Say, 1825) – crayfish snake

Nota bene: A binomial authority in parentheses indicates that the species was originally described in a genus other than Liodytes.
