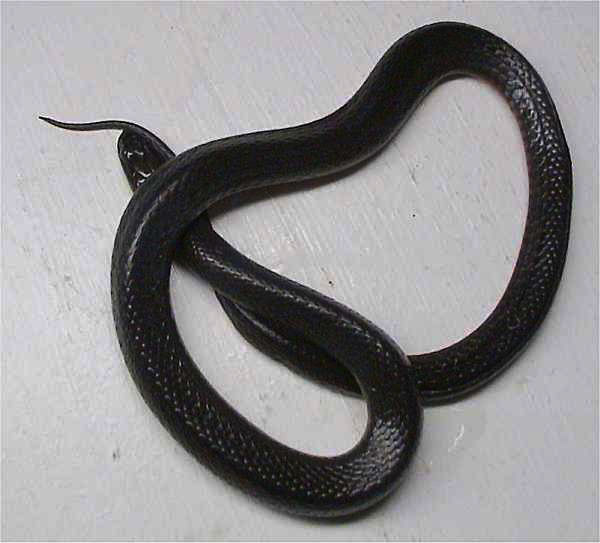

Conservation status
- Least Concern (IUCN 3.1)

Scientific classification
- Kingdom: Animalia
- Phylum: Chordata
- Class: Reptilia
- Order: Squamata
- Suborder: Serpentes
- Family: Colubridae
- Genus: Seminatrix
- Species: S. pygaea

Binomial name
- Seminatrix pygaea (Cope, 1871)
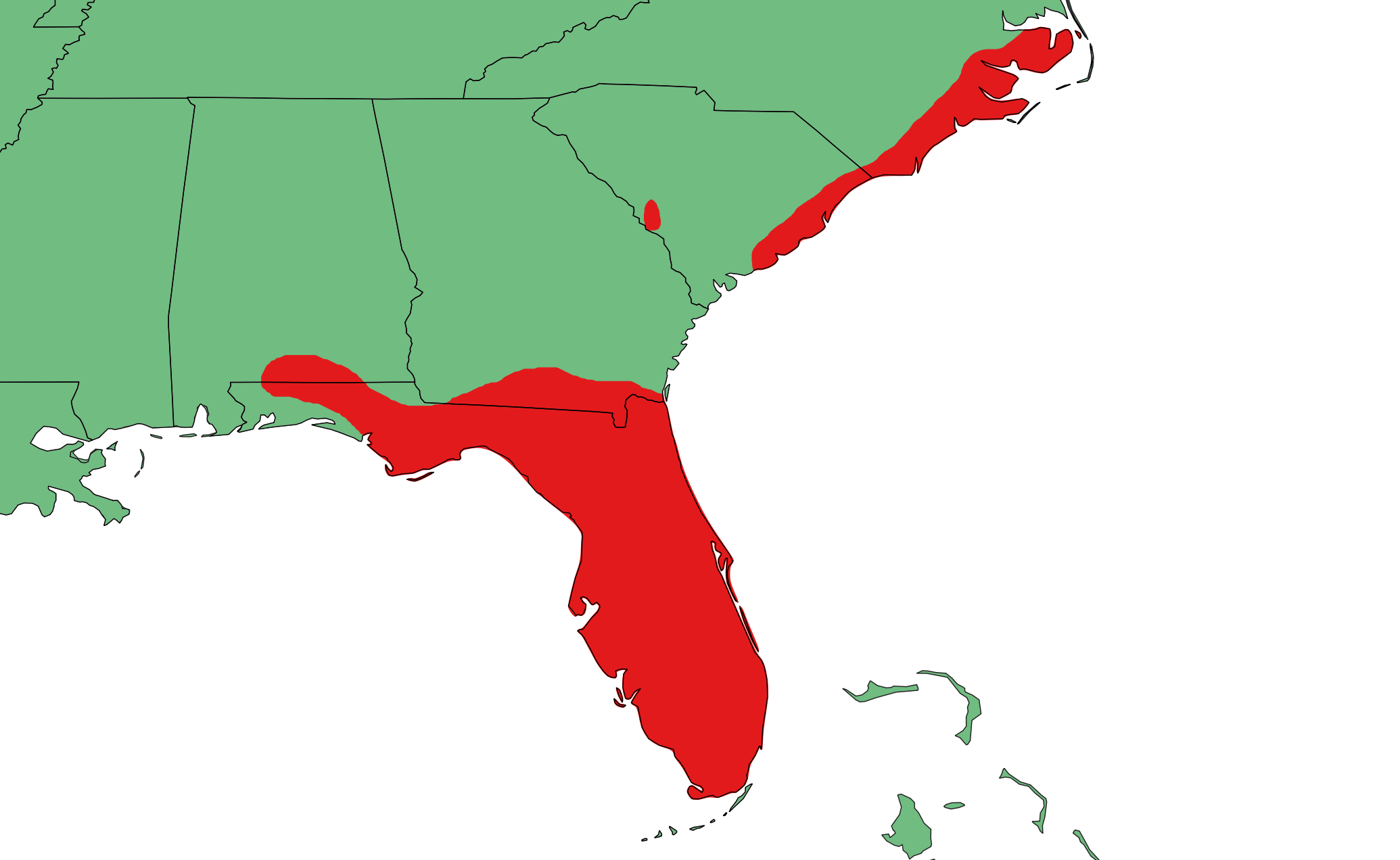

Synonyms
- Contia pygaea Cope, 1871; Tropidonotus pygæus — Boulenger, 1893; Seminatrix pygaea — Cope, 1895; Liodytes pygaea — McVay & Carstens, 2013

= Black swamp snake =

Species of snake

The black swamp snake (Liodytes pygaea) is a species of snake in the subfamily Natricinae of the family Colubridae. The species is endemic to the southeastern United States. There are three subspecies, including the nominotypical subspecies.

== Common names ==
Additional common names for L. pygaea include black swampsnake, mud snake, red-bellied mud snake, and swamp snake.

== Subspecies ==
The following three subspecies are recognized as being valid.

- South Florida swamp snake, Liodytes pygaea cyclas (Dowling, 1950)
- Carolina swamp snake, Liodytes pygaea paludis (Dowling, 1950)
- North Florida swamp snake, Liodytes pygaea pygaea (Cope, 1871)

Nota bene: A trinomial authority in parentheses indicates that the subspecies was originally described in a genus other than Liodytes.

== Geographic range ==
L. pygaea is found in the states of North Carolina, South Carolina, Georgia, Alabama, and Florida on the east coast of the United States.

== Habitat ==
L. pygaea prefers swampland habitat that is heavily vegetated.

== Description ==
The black swamp snake is a small, thin snake, usually 25–38 cm (10–15 in) long (including tail); the record size is 55 cm (22 in). It is uniformly black on the dorsum, with a bright orange or red belly.

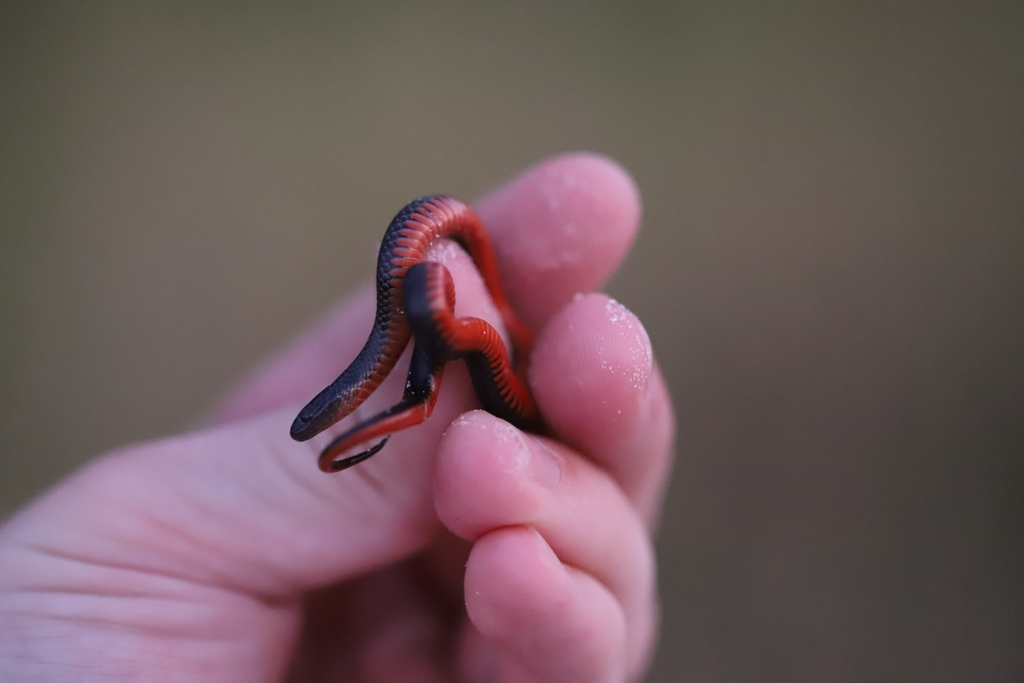
L. pygaea cyclas showing black dorsum and red ventrum.

== Behavior ==
The black swamp snake is almost entirely aquatic. It spends most of its time hiding among dense vegetation in tannic cypress swamps.

== Diet ==
L. pygaea feeds on small fish, tadpoles, frogs, salamanders, sirens, amphiumas, and invertebrates, such as leeches and earthworms.

== Reproduction ==
The black swamp snake is ovoviviparous, giving birth to live young directly in shallow water. Unlike many snakes, females feed actively while gravid, suggesting that they may pass nutrients directly on to the young. Broods of 11 to 13 have been observed. Newborns are 11–14 cm (4.3–5.5 in) long (including tail).
