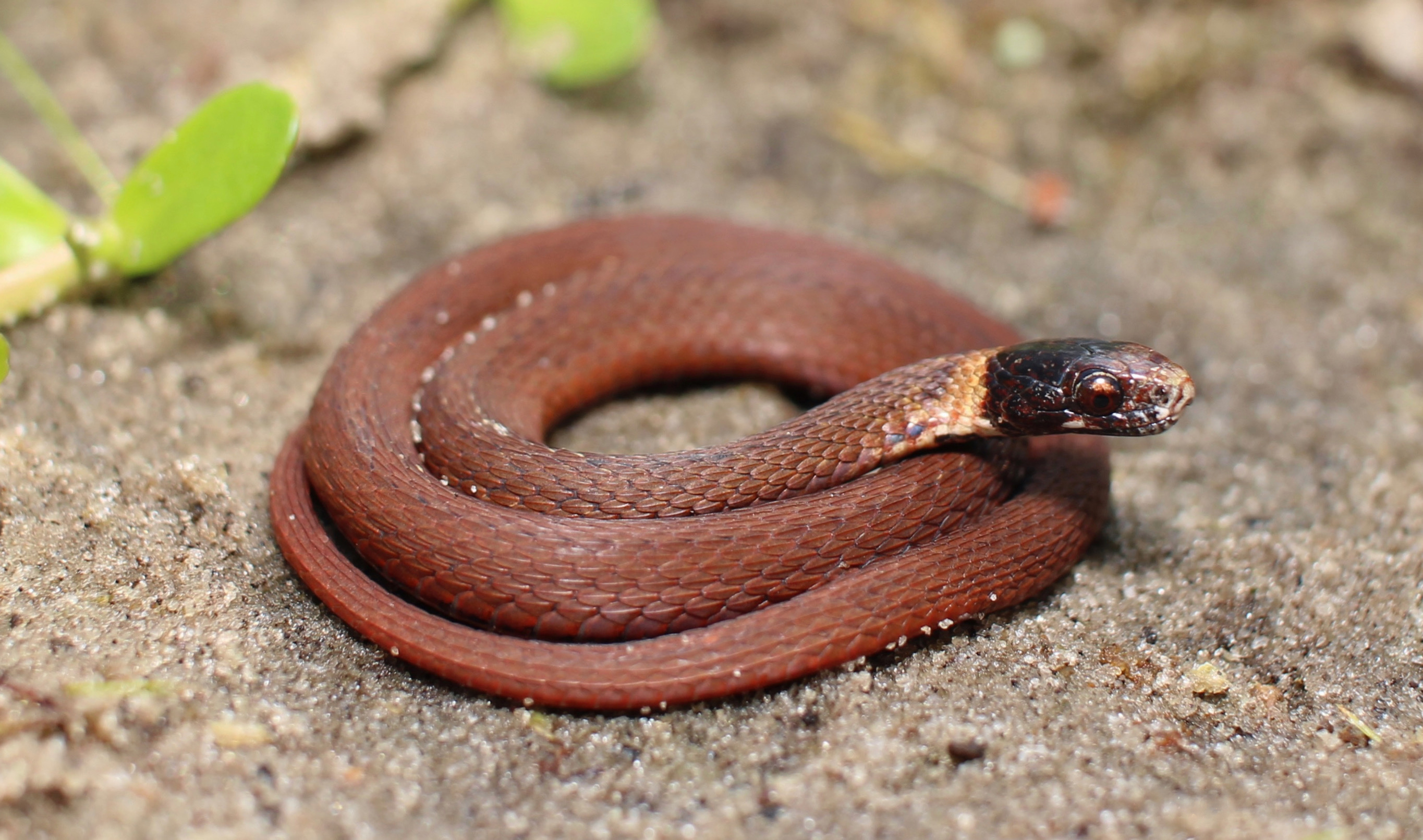

Conservation status
- Least Concern (IUCN 3.1)

Scientific classification
- Kingdom: Animalia
- Phylum: Chordata
- Class: Reptilia
- Order: Squamata
- Suborder: Serpentes
- Family: Colubridae
- Genus: Storeria
- Species: S. occipitomaculata

Binomial name
- Storeria occipitomaculata (Storer, 1839)

Synonyms
- Coluber occipito-maculatus Storer, 1839; Tropidonotus occipito-maculatus — Holbrook, 1842; Storeria occipitomaculata — Baird & Girard, 1853; Ischnognathus occipitomaculatus — Günther, 1858; Storeria occipitomaculata — Yarrow, 1883

= Storeria occipitomaculata =

Species of snake

Storeria occipitomaculata, commonly known as the redbelly snake or the red-bellied snake, is a species of harmless snake in the subfamily Natricinae of the family Colubridae. The species is native to North America (Canada and the United States).

== Description ==
Storeria occipitomaculata is a small woodland species that usually measures 4–10 in (10–25 cm) in total length (including tail). Its dorsal color ranges from orange to gray, black, or brown. It can be distinguished from other species by its bright red or orange underbelly. Many individuals have a light brown ring behind the head.

== Habitat ==
Storeria occipitomaculata prefers warmer habitats, and in the more northern limits of its range will inhabit abandoned ant mounds. These mounds absorb solar radiation and are insulated which allows for a longer active season. This species, with large eyes and a kinetic skull, is not able to burrow on its own effectively, and abandoned ant mounds allow it access to a warm retreat. Individuals of this species can be found under logs and leafy debris due to its secretive nature.

== Reproduction ==
Storeria occipitomaculata bears live young by ovoviviparity. Studies of the redbelly snake have determined that it reproduces annually, and females have been found to be gravid during spring and early summer. While body size varies throughout the redbelly snake's geographic range, the average litter size tends to remain the same with an average of 7–9 young per litter. The redbelly snake begins mating at around two years of age and must be a minimum of 22 centimetres (8.7 in) in order to reach sexual maturity.

== Diet ==
The red-bellied snake, like other members of its genus, preys primarily on slugs. Its teeth are slender and distally curved to better catch slimy prey.

== Behavior ==
Storeria occipitomaculata exhibits a distinctive behavior of lip-curling. The purposes of this behavior are still being studied, but are hypothesized to aid in prey capture and handling, and in predator deterrence. The redbelly snake has also exhibited death-feigning behavior to possible predators, in which it laterally compresses parts of its body to mimic the appearance of injuries. It can also mock the posture of venomous snakes by flattening its body, raising its head, and flexing its neck.

== Etymology ==
The specific name, occipitomaculata, is derived from the Latin words occiput which means "the back part of the head" and maculata meaning "spotted". The generic name, Storeria, of the monophyletic clade honors zoologist David Humphreys Storer.

== Subspecies ==
Three subspecies, including the nominotypical subspecies, are recognized as being valid:

- Florida redbelly snake – Storeria occipitomaculata obscura Trapido, 1944
- Northern redbelly snake – Storeria occipitomaculata occipitomaculata (Storer, 1839)
- Black Hills redbelly snake – Storeria occipitomaculata pahasapae H.M. Smith, 1963

Nota bene: A trinomial authority in parentheses indicates that the subspecies was originally described in a genus other than Storeria.
