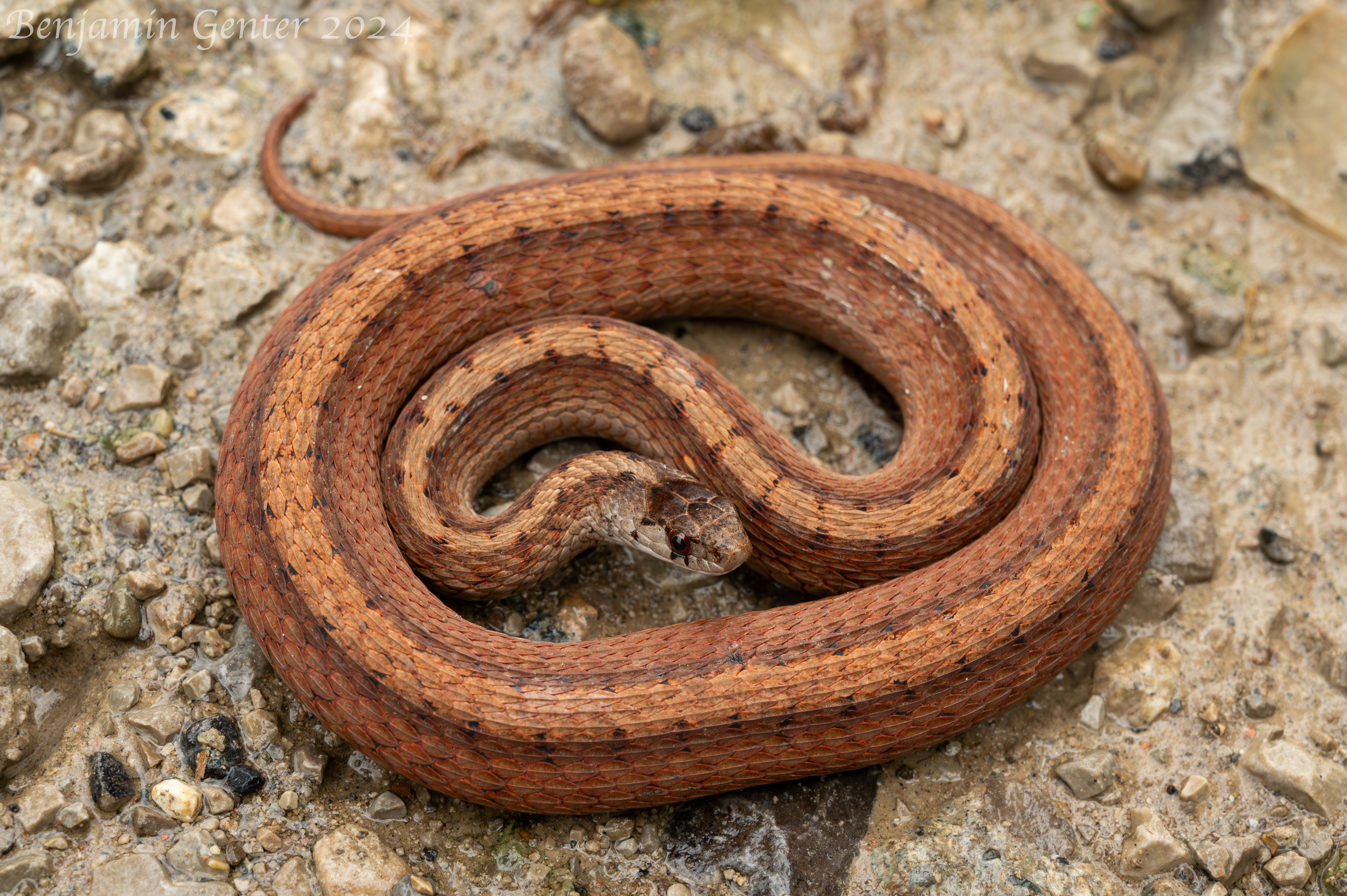

Conservation status
- Least Concern (IUCN 3.1)

Scientific classification
- Kingdom: Animalia
- Phylum: Chordata
- Class: Reptilia
- Order: Squamata
- Suborder: Serpentes
- Family: Colubridae
- Genus: Storeria
- Species: S. dekayi

Binomial name
- Storeria dekayi (Holbrook, 1836)

Synonyms
- Coluber dekayi Holbrook, 1836; Tropidonotus dekayi — Holbrook, 1842; Ischnognathus dekayi — A.M.C. Duméril & Bibron, 1853; Storeria dekayi — Baird & Girard, 1853

= DeKay's brown snake =

Species of snake

Storeria dekayi, commonly known as De Kay's brown snake, De Kay's snake, and simply the brown snake (along with many other snakes), is a small non-venomous species of snake in the family Colubridae. The species is native to North America and Central America.

== Geographic range ==
S. dekayi is native to Southern Ontario and Quebec, most of the eastern half of the United States, through Mexico, Guatemala, Honduras, and possibly El Salvador. More specifically, this common species inhabits most wetland and terrestrial habitats east of the Great Plains from sea level to 1,400 meters (4,600 feet) above sea level.

== Description ==
Dorsally, S. dekayi is brown to gray with a lighter center stripe bordered by small black spots; ventrally, it is lighter brown or pink with small black dots at the ends of the ventral scales. Adults usually measure less than 12 inches (30 cm) in total length (including tail), but the record total length is 19 3/8 inches (49 cm). On average, juveniles measured 3 inches (7.68 cm) just after being born. The dorsal scales are keeled, and it has no loreal scale. Females exceed males in snout–vent length and number of ventral scales while males exceed females in tail length, head dimensions, and number of subcaudal scales.

== Habitat ==
S. dekayi is a lover of urban areas and tends to frequent cities more often than the countryside. It can also be found in areas such as wetlands, grasslands, dunes, and forests, but it is most commonly encountered where humans are found.It prefers moist habitats. Although S. dekayi is solitary, aggregations of individuals have been observed.

== Reproduction ==
Like other natricine snakes such as water snakes (genus Nerodia) and garter snakes (genus Thamnophis), S. dekayi is a viviparous species, giving birth to live young. Sexual maturity is reached at two to three years. Females have seasonal sperm storage that allows for delayed fertilization and parturition, which synchronize birth timing with peak prey availability. Mating takes place in the spring, after snakes emerge from brumation. Field studies have shown that males use pheromone-based mate searching to find receptive females. Between 3 and 41 young are born in late summer.

== Diet ==
S. dekayi primarily feeds on slugs, snails, and earthworms. In the southern extent of its region, the snake usually preys predominantly on earthworms; however, in the northern reaches of its range, slugs are the predominant food source. It has specialized jaws that allow it to remove snails from their shells for consumption. Reports of other invertebrates (such as woodlice, mites, or millipedes) in the diet of S. dekayi are more than likely the result of accidental ingestion rather than intentional feeding, in which one of these invertebrates may have adhered to a slug or other prey item being consumed.

== Ecology ==
S. dekayi is a prey item for larger snakes, large frogs and toads, birds, and many mammals including weasels and invasive housecats. The milksnake (Lampropeltis triangulum) has previously been reported to be a predator of S. dekayi. An observed predator avoidance mechanism of S. dekayi is coiling the anterior portion of the body and swaying it side to side as it attempts to flee. In addition to this, it releases a foul musk from its cloaca when threatened. The species is shy and rarely found in the open, usually found hiding under rocks or logs for safety and comfort. It will also occasionally burrow. Its most active period is from about March to October.

== Etymology ==
The specific name, dekayi, is in honor of American zoologist James Ellsworth De Kay (1792–1851), who collected the first specimen on Long Island, New York, while the generic name, Storeria, honors American zoologist David Humphreys Storer.

This is the only North American snake whose binomial is a double honorific – that is, both the generic name and the specific name honor people.

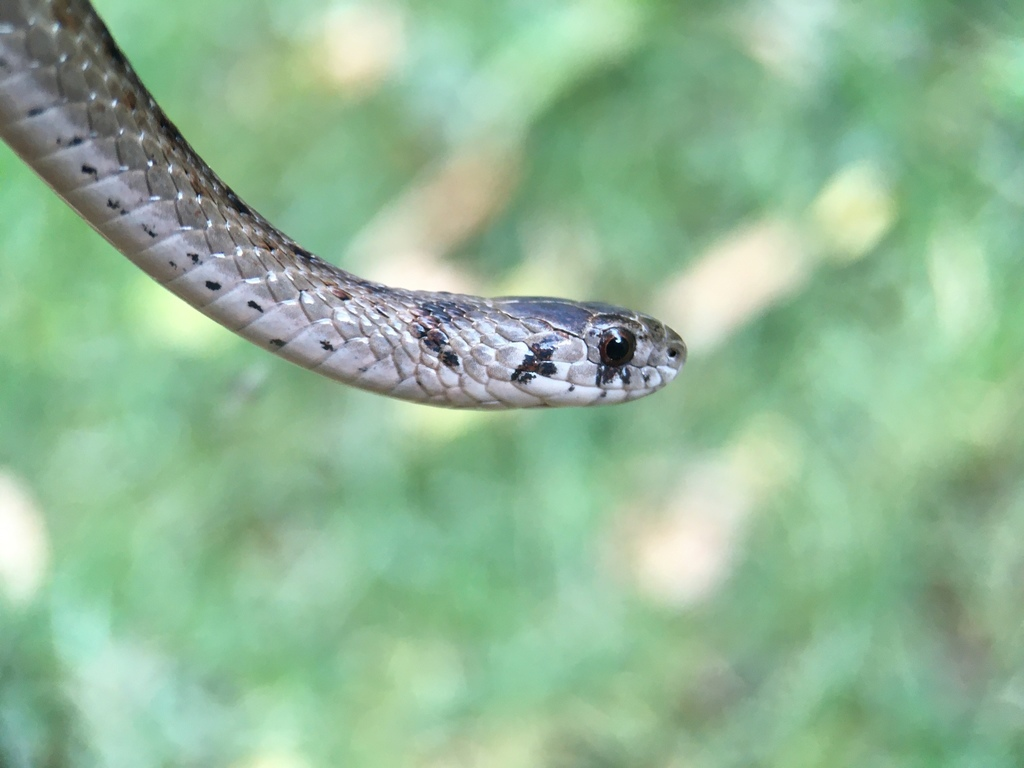
Dekay's brown snake, closeup of head
