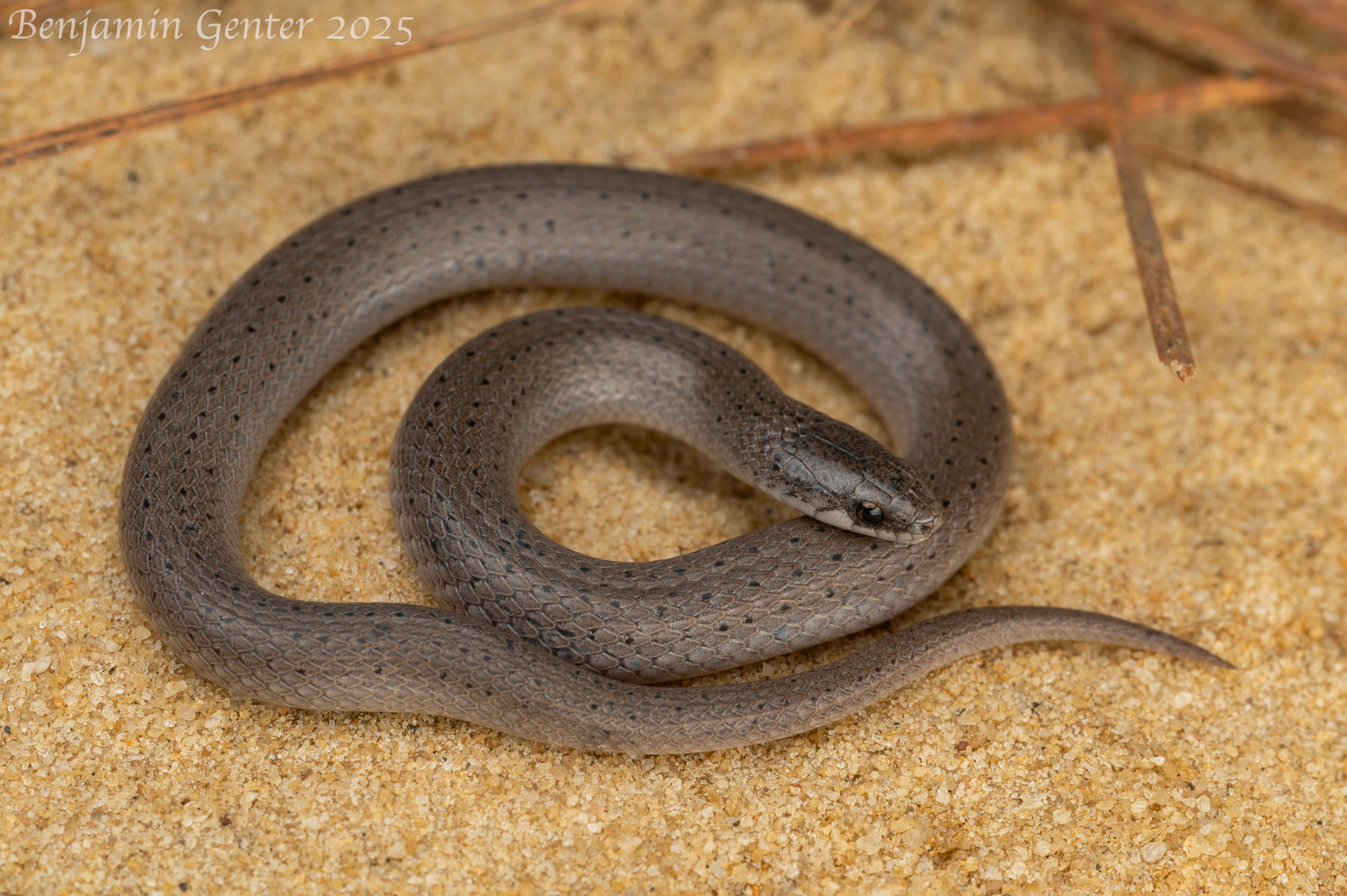
- eastern smooth earth snake (Virginia valeriae valeriae)
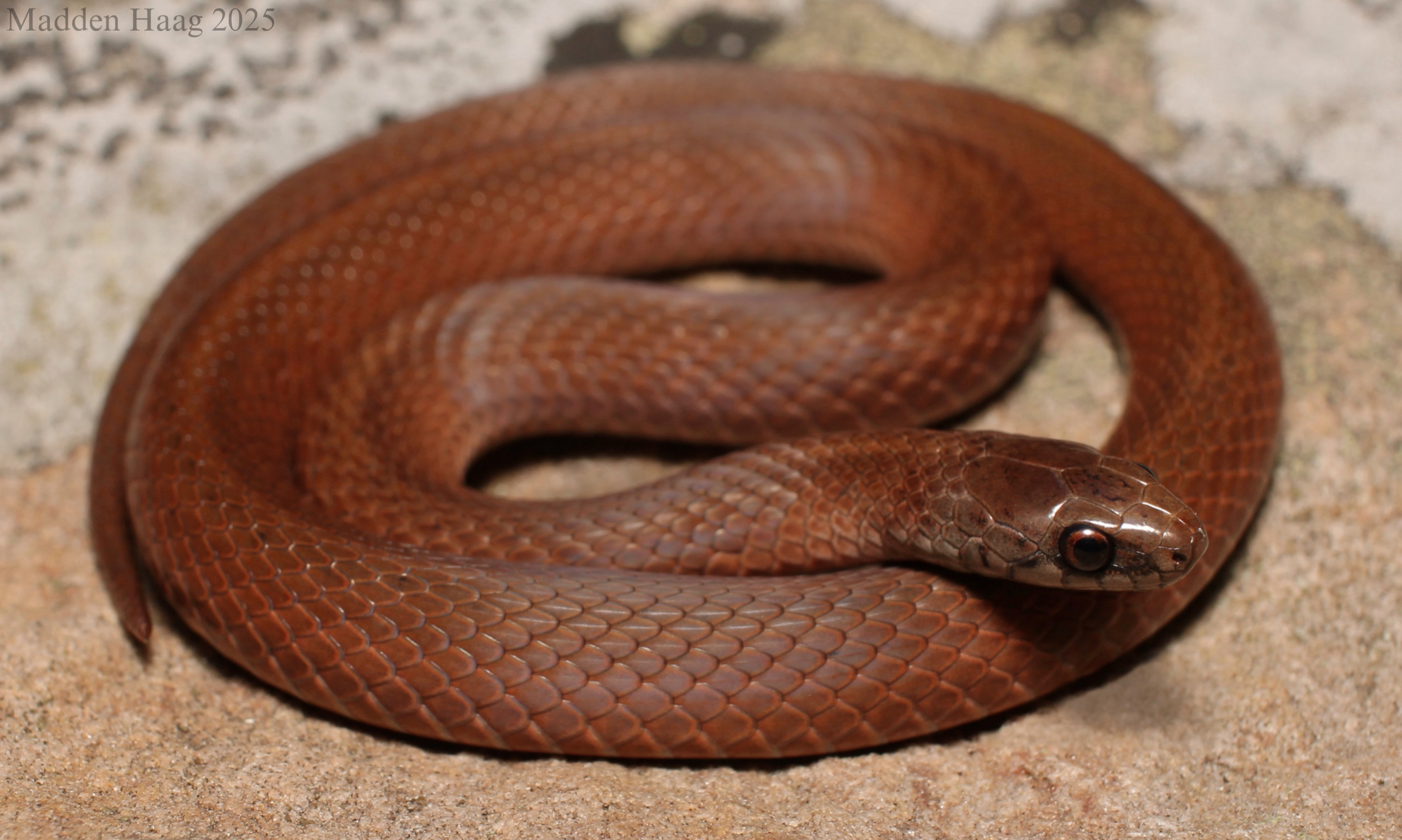
- mountain earth snake (Virginia valeriae pulchra)

Conservation status
- Least Concern (IUCN 3.1)

Scientific classification
- Kingdom: Animalia
- Phylum: Chordata
- Class: Reptilia
- Order: Squamata
- Suborder: Serpentes
- Family: Colubridae
- Genus: Virginia; Baird & Girard, 1853
- Species: V. valeriae

Binomial name
- Virginia valeriae Baird & Girard, 1853

Synonyms
- Virginia valeriæ Baird & Girard, 1853; Carphophis harpertii A.M.C. Duméril, Bibron & A.H.A. Duméril, 1854; Virginia elegans Kennicott, 1859; Virginia harperti — Cope, 1875; Haldea valeriae — H. Campbell, 1962; Virginia valeriae — Conant, 1975

= Smooth earth snake =

Species of snake

The smooth earth snake (Virginia valeriae) is a species of nonvenomous natricine colubrid snake native to the eastern half of the United States. There are three recognized subspecies.

== Etymology ==
The specific name or epithet, valeriae, is in honor of Valeria Biddle Blaney (1828–1900), who collected the first specimen in Kent County, Maryland, and was a first cousin of Spencer Fullerton Baird.

== Geographic range ==
The smooth earth snake is found from Texas and Iowa to New Jersey and Florida.

== Description ==
The following is a description of the scalation of Virginia valeriae. Rostral nearly as deep as broad, visible from above; internasals much shorter than the prefrontals; frontal longer than broad, shorter than the parietals; loreal one and a half to two and a half times as long as deep; two or three postoculars; temporals 1+2; six upper labials, third and fourth entering the eye; four lower labials in contact with the anterior chin shields, which are as long as or shorter than the posterior. Dorsal scales in 15 or 17 rows. Anal divided. Ventrals 111–135; subcaudals 24–37.

The following description of coloration of a live specimen (not in alcohol) uses Robert Ridgway's Color Standards and Color Nomenclature (1912). Dorsally V. valeriae is benzo brown, deep brownish drab, mars brown, or light brownish drab. The first row of dorsal scales is colored like the adjacent ventrals, which are light vinaceous-fawn, pale vinaceous-fawn, pale grayish vinaceous, or pale vinaceous-pink. The top of the head is hair brown or like the dorsum, with many dark spots on the plates. The upper labials are ecru-drab or lighter, some with drab-gray spots. There is a small black ring around the eye. The ventral surface of the head is white.

Sometimes a faint median light line is present. Also, there may be tiny black spots on the back and sides, especially in the nominate race (Virginia valeriae valeriae).

Adults are usually 18–25 cm (7.1–9.8 in) in total length (including tail); record 33.7 cm (13 1/4 in).

== Habitat ==
The smooth earth snake is a small, fossorial species which spends most of its time buried in loose soil or leaf litter.

== Diet ==
The smooth earth snake eats primarily earthworms and soft-bodied arthropods.

== Behavior ==
Given its lack of sufficient defense mechanisms against larger animals, the smooth earth snake is generally not aggressive towards humans and is harmless if encountered. While it does have teeth, the size of the mouth and teeth make any strikes against humans superficial at worst. It may defecate as a defense mechanism to make itself less palatable to would-be predators. If necessary, it can be safely picked up by hand and relocated.

== Subspecies ==
Including the nominotypical subspecies, three subspecies of Virginia valeriae are recognized as being valid. These subspecies have been considered full species.

- Virginia valeriae elegans Kennicott, 1859 – western earth snake, dorsal scales in 17 rows, southern Indiana through western Kentucky and Tennessee to the Gulf of Mexico, westward to eastern Kansas and central Texas.
- Virginia valeriae pulchra (Richmond, 1954) – mountain earth snake, dorsal scales weakly keeled, mountains of western Pennsylvania, and adjacent northeastern West Virginia and western Maryland.
- Virginia valeriae valeriae Baird & Girard, 1853 – eastern earth snake, dorsal scales in 15 rows, New Jersey to Georgia and west through northern Alabama, Tennessee, and southern Ohio.

Nota bene: A trinomial authority in parentheses indicates that the subspecies was originally described in a genus other than Virginia.

== Reproduction ==
V. valeriae bears live young in August. Brood size is usually fewer than 10. The total length of a newborn is about 6 cm (about 2.5 in).
