= List of reptiles of Alabama =

The U.S. state of Alabama is home to 93 indigenous reptile species, not including subspecies. Indigenous species include one species of crocodilian, 12 lizard species, 49 snake species, and 31 turtle species. Three native species have possibly been extirpated from the state. These include the eastern indigo snake, southern hognose snake and the mimic glass lizard.

There are four known introduced reptile species, all lizards. They include the Indo-Pacific gecko, brown anole, Texas horned lizard, and Mediterranean house gecko.

Human predation and habitat destruction have placed several reptile species and subspecies at risk of extirpation or extinction. The Alabama Department of Conservation and Natural Resources lists the conservation status of each species within the state with a rank of lowest, low, moderate, high, and highest concern.

== Alligator ==
Image	Scientific name	Common name	Family	Conservation concern
	Alligator mississippiensis	American alligator	Alligatoridae	No longer listed as endangered, U.S. Fish and Wildlife now lists as threatened

== Lizards ==
Image	Scientific name	Common name	Family	Conservation concern
	Ophisaurus attenuatus longicaudus	eastern slender glass lizard	Anguidae	Moderate
	Ophisaurus mimicus	mimic glass lizard	Anguidae	Possibly extirpated
	Ophisaurus ventralis	eastern glass lizard	Anguidae	Moderate
	Hemidactylus garnotii	Indo-Pacific gecko	Gekkonidae	Exotic
	Hemidactylus turcicus	Mediterranean house gecko	Gekkonidae	Exotic
	Anolis carolinensis carolinensis	green anole	Dactyloidae	Lowest
	Anolis sagrei carolinensis	brown anole	Dactyloidae	Exotic
	Phrynosoma cornutum	Texas horned lizard	Phrynosomatidae	Exotic
	Sceloporus undulatus	eastern fence lizard	Phrynosomatidae	Low
	Plestiodon anthracinus	coal skink	Scincidae	High
	Plestiodon egregius	mole skink	Scincidae	Low/ Possibly declining
	Plestiodon fasciatus	five-lined skink	Scincidae	Lowest
	Plestiodon inexpectatus	southeastern five-lined skink	Scincidae	High
	Plestiodon laticeps	broad-headed skink	Scincidae	Low
	Scincella lateralis	ground skink little brown skink	Scincidae	Low
	Cnemidophorus sexlineatus sexlineatus	eastern six-lined racerunner	Teiidae	Moderate

== Snakes ==
Alabama is home to sixty-six known snake species and subspecies. There are nine snake species and subspecies that are venomous to humans in the state. The remaining fifty-five species and subspecies pose no threat to humans.

Image	Scientific name	Common name	Family	Venomous to humans	Conservation concern
	Agkistrodon contortrix	eastern copperhead	Viperidae	Yes	Lowest
	Agkistrodon conanti	Florida cottonmouth green-tailed moccasin	Viperidae	Yes	Lowest
	Agkistrodon piscivorus	northern cottonmouth water moccasin	Viperidae	Yes	Lowest
	Carphophis amoenus amoenus	eastern worm snake	Colubridae	No	Lowest
	Carphophis amoenus helenae	midwestern worm snake	Colubridae	No	Lowest
	Cemophora coccinea copei	northern scarlet snake	Colubridae	No	Lowest
	Coluber constrictor constrictor	northern black racer	Colubridae	No	Low
	Coluber constrictor priapus	southern black racer	Colubridae	No	Low
	Crotalus adamanteus	eastern diamondback rattlesnake	Viperidae	Yes	High
	Crotalus horridus	timber rattlesnake canebrake rattlesnake	Viperidae	Yes	Low
	Diadophis punctatus edwardsii	northern ringneck snake	Colubridae	No	Lowest
	Diadophis punctatus punctatus	southern ringneck snake	Colubridae	No	Lowest
	Diadophis punctatus stictogenys	Mississippi ringneck snake	Colubridae	No	Lowest
	Drymarchon couperi	eastern indigo snake	Colubridae	No	Highest, Possibly extirpated
	Farancia abacura abacura	eastern mud snake	Colubridae	No	Low
	Farancia abacura reinwardtii	western mud snake	Colubridae	No	Low
	Farancia erytrogramma erytrogramma	rainbow snake	Colubridae	No	Highest
	Heterodon platirhinos	eastern hognose snake	Colubridae	No	Moderate
	Heterodon simus	southern hognose snake	Colubridae	No	Highest, Possibly extirpated
	Lampropeltis calligaster	prairie kingsnake	Colubridae	No	High
	Lampropeltis rhombomaculata	mole kingsnake	Colubridae	No	Moderate
	Lampropeltis elapsoides	scarlet kingsnake	Colubridae	No	Low
	Lampropeltis getula	eastern kingsnake	Colubridae	No	High
	Lampropeltis nigra	black kingsnake	Colubridae	No	Low
	Lampropeltis triangulum triangulum	eastern milk snake	Colubridae	No	Moderate
	Lampropeltis triangulum syspila	red milk snake	Colubridae	No	Moderate
	Masticophis flagellum flagellum	eastern coachwhip	Colubridae	No	Moderate
	Micrurus fulvius	eastern coral snake	Elapidae	Yes	High
	Nerodia clarkii clarkii	Gulf salt marsh snake	Colubridae	No	Moderate
	Nerodia cyclopion	Mississippi green water snake	Colubridae	No	Moderate
	Nerodia erythrogaster erythrogaster	redbelly water snake	Colubridae	No	Lowest
	Nerodia erythrogaster flavigaster	yellowbelly water snake	Colubridae	No	Lowest
	Nerodia fasciata confluens	broad-banded water snake	Colubridae	No	Lowest
	Nerodia fasciata fasciata	southern banded water snake	Colubridae	No	Lowest
	Nerodia fasciata pictiventris	Florida banded water snake	Colubridae	No	Lowest
	Nerodia floridana	Florida green water snake	Colubridae	No	Moderate
	Nerodia rhombifer	diamondback water snake	Colubridae	No	Low
	Nerodia sipedon pleuralis	midland water snake	Colubridae	No	Lowest
	Nerodia taxispilota	brown water snake	Colubridae	No	Low
	Opheodrys aestivus	rough green snake	Colubridae	No	Low
	Pantherophis guttatus guttatus	corn snake	Colubridae	No	Moderate
	Pantherophis alleghaniensis	central rat snake	Colubridae	No	Lowest
	Pituophis melanoleucus lodingi	black pine snake	Colubridae	No	Highest
	Pituophis melanoleucus melanoleucus	northern pine snake	Colubridae	No	High
	Pituophis melanoleucus mugitus	Florida pine snake	Colubridae	No	High
	Liodytes rigida sinicola	Gulf crayfish snake	Colubridae	No	Lowest
	Regina septemvittata	queen snake	Colubridae	No	Moderate
	Rhadinaea flavilata	pine woods snake	Colubridae	No	Moderate
	Liodytes pygaea pygaea	North Florida swamp snake	Colubridae	No	High
	Sistrurus miliarius barbouri	dusky pigmy rattlesnake Florida ground rattlesnake	Viperidae	Yes	Moderate
	Sistrurus miliarius miliarius	Carolina pigmy rattlesnake ground rattlesnake	Viperidae	Yes	Moderate
	Sistrurus miliarius streckeri	western pigmy rattlesnake ground rattlesnake	Viperidae	Yes	Moderate
	Storeria dekayi dekayi	northern brown snake	Colubridae	No	Lowest
	Storeria dekayi limnetes	marsh brown snake	Colubridae	No	Lowest
	Storeria dekayi wrightorum	midland brown snake	Colubridae	No	Lowest
	Storeria occipitomaculata occipitomaculata	northern redbelly snake	Colubridae	No	Lowest
	Tantilla coronata	southeastern crown snake	Colubridae	No	Low
	Thamnophis saurita saurita	eastern ribbon snake	Colubridae	No	Low
	Thamnophis sirtalis sirtalis	common garter snake	Colubridae	No	Low
	Virginia striatula	rough earth snake	Colubridae	No	Lowest
	Virginia valeriae elegans	western smooth earth snake	Colubridae	No	Lowest
	Virginia valeriae valeriae	eastern smooth earth snake	Colubridae	No	Lowest

== Turtles ==
Alabama law makes it illegal to take, sell or possess turtles, turtle parts, or turtle eggs from the wild for commercial purposes.

Image	Scientific name	Common name	Family	Conservation concern
	Caretta caretta	loggerhead sea turtle	Cheloniidae	Highest
	Chelonia mydas	green sea turtle	Cheloniidae	Highest
	Lepidochelys kempii	Atlantic ridley sea turtle	Cheloniidae	Highest/ U.S. Fish and Wildlife lists as endangered
	Chelydra serpentina	common snapping turtle	Chelydridae	Lowest
	Macrochelys temminckii	alligator snapping turtle	Chelydridae	Wheeler Wildlife Refuge lists as endangered
	Dermochelys coriacea	leatherback sea turtle	Dermochelyidae	Highest/ U.S. Fish and Wildlife lists as endangered
	Chrysemys picta picta	eastern painted turtle	Emydidae	Lowest
	Chrysemys picta dorsalis	southern painted turtle	Emydidae	Lowest
	Chrysemys picta marginata	midland painted turtle	Emydidae	Lowest
	Deirochelys reticularia reticularia	eastern chicken turtle	Emydidae	Low
	Graptemys barbouri	Barbour's map turtle	Emydidae	High
	Graptemys ernsti	Escambia map turtle	Emydidae	Moderate
	Graptemys geographica	northern map turtle	Emydidae	Low
	Graptemys nigrinoda delticola	delta map turtle southern black-knobbed sawback	Emydidae	Moderate
	Graptemys nigrinoda nigrinoda	black-knobbed map turtle northern black-knobbed sawback	Emydidae	Moderate
	Graptemys ouachitensis	Ouachita map turtle	Emydidae	Lowest
	Graptemys pulchra	Alabama map turtle	Emydidae	Moderate
	Malaclemys terrapin pileata	Mississippi diamondback terrapin	Emydidae	Highest
	Pseudemys alabamensis	Alabama red-bellied cooter (Designated as official state reptile)	Emydidae	Highest/ U.S. Fish and Wildlife lists as endangered
	Pseudemys concinna concinna	eastern river cooter	Emydidae	Lowest
	Pseudemys concinna floridana	coastal plain cooter	Emydidae	Lowest
	Trachemys scripta elegans	red-eared slider	Emydidae	Lowest
	Trachemys scripta scripta	yellow-bellied slider	Emydidae	Lowest
	Terrapene carolina carolina	eastern box turtle	Emydidae	Low
	Terrapene carolina major	Gulf Coast box turtle	Emydidae	Low
	Terrapene carolina triunguis	three-toed box turtle	Emydidae	Low
	Kinosternon subrubrum	eastern mud turtle	Kinosternidae	Lowest
	Sternotherus minor minor	loggerhead musk turtle	Kinosternidae	Low
	Sternotherus minor peltifer	stripe-necked musk turtle	Kinosternidae	Low
	Sternotherus depressus	flattened musk turtle	Kinosternidae	High
	Sternotherus odoratus	common musk turtle stinkpot turtle	Kinosternidae	Lowest
	Gopherus polyphemus	gopher tortoise	Testudinidae	High
	Apalone ferox	Florida softshell turtle	Trionychidae	Moderate
	Apalone mutica	smooth softshell turtle	Trionychidae	Low
	Apalone spinifera	spiny softshell turtle	Trionychidae	Low
	Eretmochelys imbricata imbricata	Atlantic hawksbill	Cheloniidae	Highest/U.S. Fish and Wildlife lists as endangered
