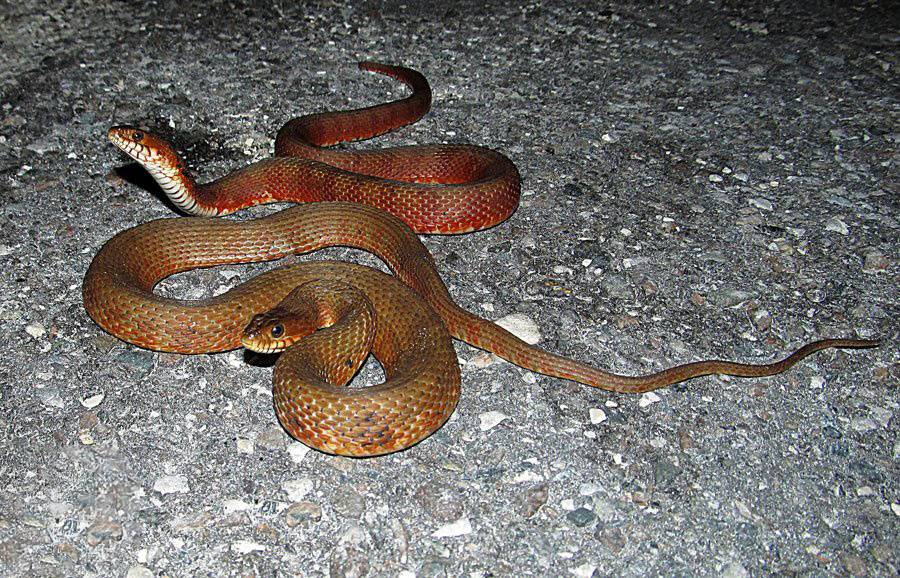
- N. clarkii compressicauda, red color phase
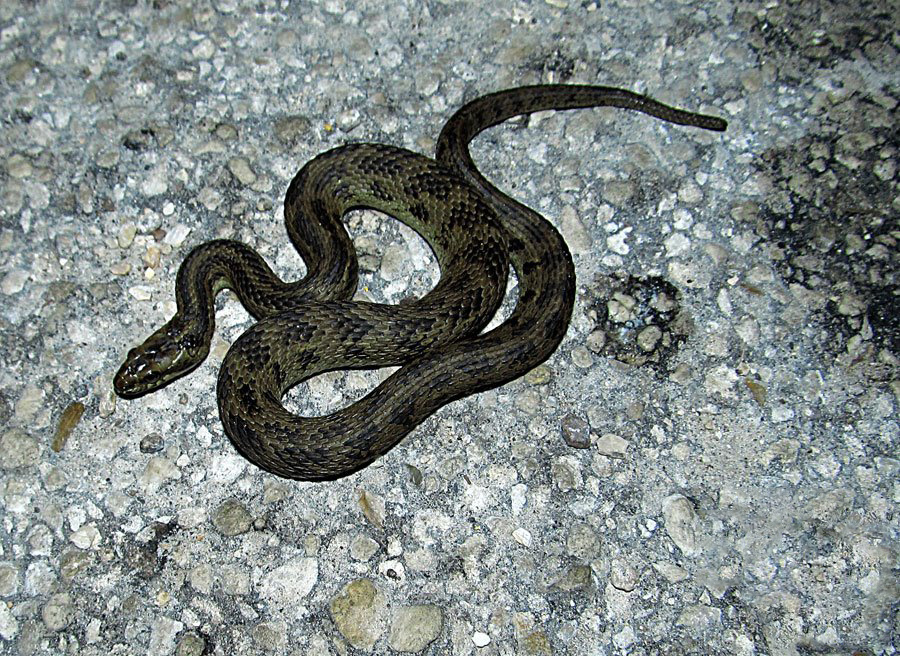
- N. clarkii compressicauda, normal color phase

Conservation status
- Least Concern (IUCN 3.1)

- Apparently Secure (NatureServe)

Scientific classification
- Kingdom: Animalia
- Phylum: Chordata
- Class: Reptilia
- Order: Squamata
- Suborder: Serpentes
- Family: Colubridae
- Genus: Nerodia
- Species: N. clarkii

Binomial name
- Nerodia clarkii (Baird & Girard, 1853)
- Nerodia clarkii resides in coastal areas in shaded counties. Gulf salt marsh snake: Mangrove salt marsh snake: Atlantic salt marsh snake

Synonyms
- Regina clarkii — Baird & Girard, 1853; Nerodia compressicauda — Kennicott, 1860; Natrix clarkii — Cope, 1892; Tropidonotus clarkii — Boulenger, 1893; Natrix compressicauda tæniata Cope, 1895; Natrix compressicauda — Barbour, 1915; Natrix sipedon clarkii — Schmidt & Davis, 1941; Natrix fasciata clarki — Conant, 1975; Nerodia clarkii — Conant & Collins, 1991

= Nerodia clarkii =

Species of North American snake

Nerodia clarkii, commonly known as the salt marsh snake or the saltmarsh watersnake, is a species of semi-aquatic, nonvenomous, colubrid snake found in the southeastern United States. Their range extends along the tidal salt marshes of the Gulf of Mexico and the Atlantic Coast from Texas to Florida, with an additional population in northern Cuba. The three subspecies of this snake are primarily distinguished by color pattern and geographic range.

Salt marsh snakes are the only U.S. snake species indigenous to saltwater habitats, being reported as common on coastal barrier islands without freshwater (Allen 1932).

== Etymology ==
The specific name, clarkii, is in honor of American surveyor and naturalist John Henry Clark (1830–1885).

== Description and subspecies ==
=== General description ===
Salt marsh snakes grow to a total length (including tail) of 15–30 inches (38–76 cm). They are also highly variable in both pattern and coloration. Found most commonly in coastal salt marshes, this snake inhabits brackish and saltwater habitats; it is also found hiding in crab burrows. Though salt marsh snakes are common in appropriate habitat, they have a tendency to be wary and secretive, so they are rarely seen. All members of this species reproduce via live birth, and all are semi-aquatic. Furthermore, all forms of this species may be distinguished as having either 21 or 23 rows of scales.

The seawater they inhabit exerts a continual draw on their tissue's electrolyte balance, due to osmosis. Its scaly reptilian skin acts as a barrier against external dehydration, but, if ingested, seawater draws the less-salty fluid from blood and tissues into the stomach. N. clarkii is the only species to establish itself in this saline niche, drinking only rainwater when it is available, and at other times swallowing nothing but prey animals with the same diluted body fluids as their own. All water species of snake (including N. clarkii) are typically considered to be non-venomous, though they do employ a complex series of enzymes in their saliva, resulting in some inflammation and edema to those who have been bitten.

=== Subspecies ===
The salt marsh snake has three subspecies, all of which were first discovered and classified in the mid to late 1800s. They are as follows:

==== Gulf salt marsh snake (N. c. clarkii) ====
The Gulf salt marsh snake is the nominate race of N. clarkii and has the largest geographic distribution. Populations of the Gulf salt marsh snake range along the northern coast of the Gulf of Mexico from the vicinity of Corpus Christi, Texas eastward to the Gulf Hammock region of Florida. They are characterized by their prominent longitudinal striping; members of this race can be black, brown, gray, or reddish but all exhibit three lighter longitudinal stripes which run from the back of their neck to their tail. The venter is dark with a central light line of cream-colored oval blotches, sometimes flanked by a row of pale spots. The scales are in either 21 or 23 rows (usually 21), and the anal plate is divided. There is little ontogenetic difference between juvenile to fully adult snakes. Individuals subsist on a diet of primarily fish, and especially shallows-living species such as killifish and small mullet, as well as crayfish and shrimp. Members of this race are primarily nocturnal during hot summer nights, but may be found basking and foraging during daylight hours in cool weather. Sexual maturity is reached at three years.

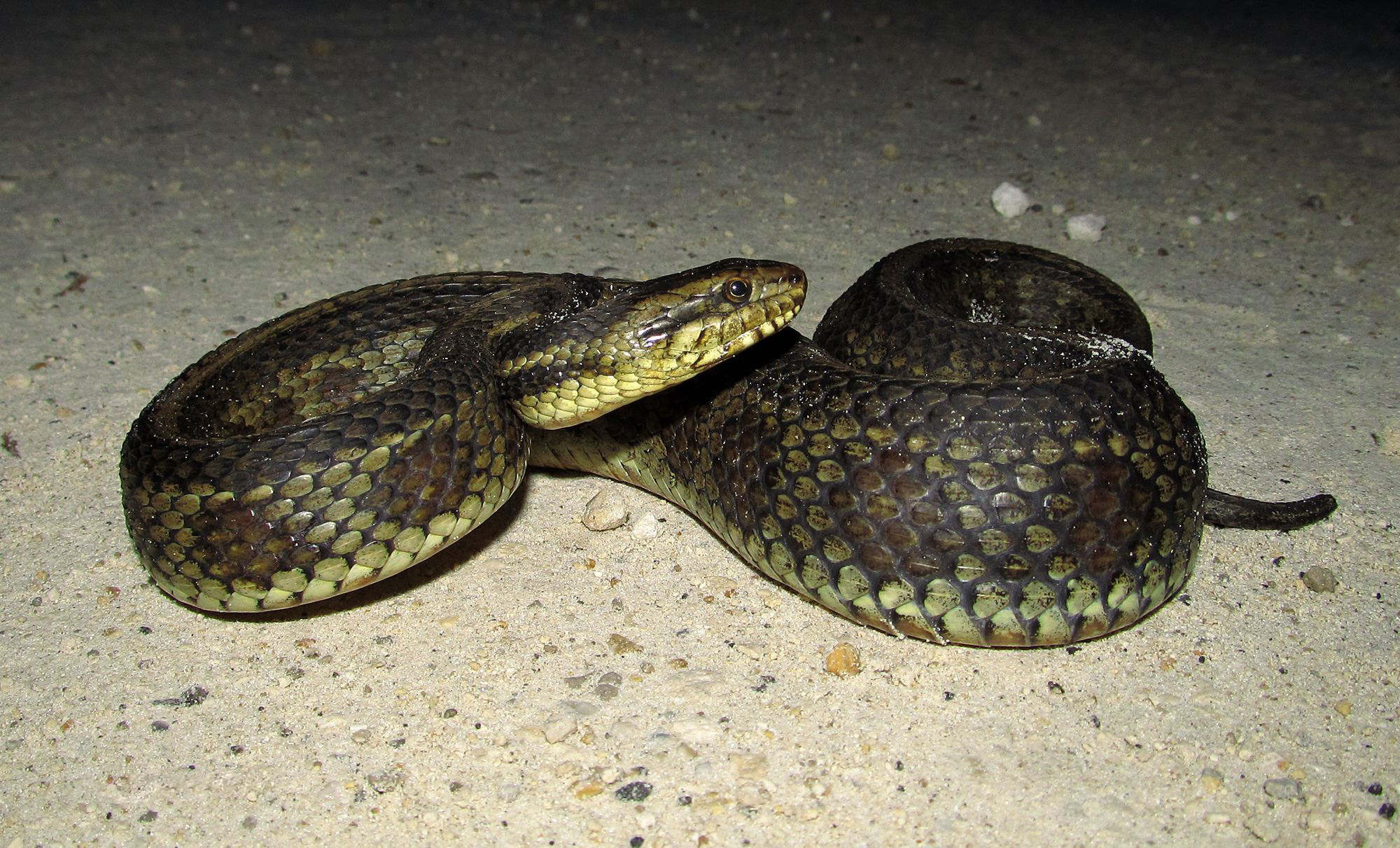
Gulf salt marsh snake (N. clarkii clarkii) in Florida

==== Mangrove salt marsh snake (N. c. compressicauda) ====
The mangrove salt marsh snake's native range of populations is in Florida, from just north of Tampa Bay south to Miami and northward along the Atlantic coast to the vicinity of Cape Canaveral. Within this range, N. c. compressicauda primarily inhabits inundated tidal marshes of buttonwood and red mangroves, so as to minimize competition with Florida's numerous freshwater natricines. One study found sheepshead minnows to be the most common of the small estuarine fish preyed upon by this subspecies; it also described this subspecies as a very sedentary predator that remained motionless until ripples in the water close to their bodies triggered rapid sideways feeding strikes. The study also found a tendency toward minimal foraging. This subspecies exhibits many colors and patterns and can be black, gray, green, or tan with darker banding or may even be solid black, reddish orange, or straw yellow. Mangrove salt marsh snakes intergrade with the other two subspecies of salt marsh snake where their geographic ranges come together., resulting in snakes with mixed pattern characters. This race is largely nocturnal, but may be seen basking in the branches of mangrove trees during the day.

==== Atlantic salt marsh snake (N. c. taeniata) ====
The Atlantic salt marsh snake (N. c. taeniata), in its pure form is restricted to a small stretch of coastline in Volusia and Indian River Counties, Florida. However, intergrades between it and the mangrove salt marsh snake extend a county or two southward of Volusia county. Much of its habitat has been lost due to commercial development of the area's coastline, such as excessive filling and development in salt marshes. In fact, habitat loss is so severe for this subspecies that it has been listed as a Threatened Species by the US Fish and Wildlife Service, having received this designation in 1977. Members of this race have a tendency to be smaller than the other two races, with a record size of only 24 inches (61 cm). Atlantic salt marsh snakes have a color pattern of four dark stripes on the neck. which are replaced by a series of dark blotches or bands on the posterior portion of the snake's body. They are striped anteriorly, and banded or blotched posteriorly. The dorsal ground color of this species is gray to olive, and the anterior stripes may be darker than the ground color. It exhibits reddish belly scutes, with each bearing a yellowish midventral spot. The diet of this species is the same as the Gulf salt marsh snake, consisting almost entirely of small fish. As with the Gulf salt marsh snake, this subspecies is diurnal during cool weather, and nocturnal during the hot summer nights.

== Taxonomy ==
Salt marsh snakes hybridize readily with the closely related southern watersnake (N. fasciata) where the two species come in contact (Myer 1988). However, the extent of hybridization is typically limited by the strong habitat preferences of both parental species. Hybrid populations are often in disturbed or altered habitats where the freshwater-saltwater ecotone has been disrupted (e.g. impoundments, canals, retention ponds). Hybridization is also frequent in the Florida Everglades and is thought to be increasing due to salt water intrusion through sea level rise and reduction of freshwater outflow.

Older sources once considered the three races of N. clarkii to be subspecies of the southern water snake, Nerodia fasciata. Others consider not only the three races of N. clarkii, but also the species N. fasciata itself, all to be subspecies of N. sipedon.

=== Subspecies ===
The following three subspecies of N. clarkii are recognized as being valid, including the nominotypical subspecies.

- Nerodia clarkii clarkii (Baird & Girard, 1853) – Gulf salt marsh snake
- Nerodia clarkii compressicauda (Kennicott, 1860) – mangrove salt marsh snake
- Nerodia clarkii taeniata (Cope, 1895) – Atlantic salt marsh snake
