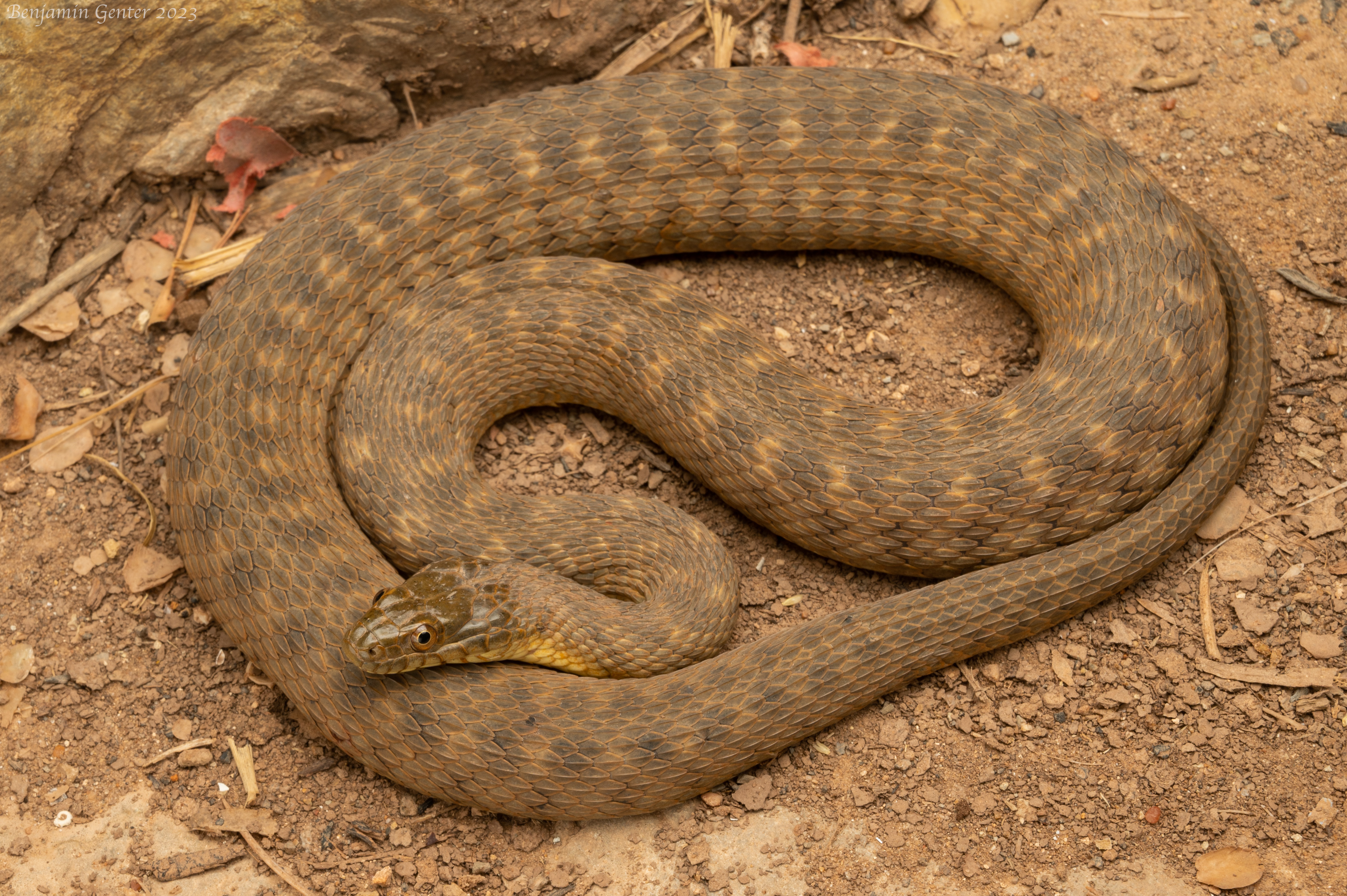

Conservation status
- Near Threatened (IUCN 3.1)

Scientific classification
- Kingdom: Animalia
- Phylum: Chordata
- Class: Reptilia
- Order: Squamata
- Suborder: Serpentes
- Family: Colubridae
- Genus: Nerodia
- Species: N. paucimaculata

Binomial name
- Nerodia paucimaculata (Tinkle & Conant, 1961)

Synonyms
- Natrix harteri paucimaculata Tinkle & Conant, 1961; Nerodia harteri paucimaculata — Conant & Collins, 1991; Nerodia paucimaculata — Densmore et al., 1992

= Nerodia paucimaculata =

Species of snake

Nerodia paucimaculata, commonly known as the Concho water snake, is a species of mostly aquatic, nonvenomous snake in the family Colubridae. The species is endemic to Texas in the United States.

== Geographic range ==
Nerodia paucimaculata is found only in west-central Texas in the Colorado and Concho river systems, in Coke, Runnels, San Saba, and Tom Green Counties.

== Conservation status ==
In 1986, the Concho Water Snake was designated as a threatened species by the U.S. Fish and Wildlife Service due to the decline of its native habitat. Research shows that Concho Water Snakes typically prefer rocky beaches with a silty substrate and free-flowing, cloudy water for reproduction and general activity. This type of habitat is found along the Concho and Colorado rivers within the following Texas counties: Runnels, Tom Green, Concho, Coleman, and McCulloch. Dams and reservoirs within these counties are also typically considered as a preferable habitat for the Concho Water Snake. In these areas, a lack of suitable stream flow was detected, compromising the preferred habitat quality of the species. In 2011, the Concho Water Snake was delisted from the Federal List of Endangered and Threatened Wildlife as a result of successful habitat restoration efforts. These efforts include, but are not limited to, the implementation of cedar brush removal and Artificial instream riffle structures. The U.S. Fish and Wildlife Service does not expect recovered habitat to experience any significant further decline in the near future, but will work with other agencies to monitor and maintain the designated critical habitat. Additionally, because the Concho Water Snake is endemic to Texas and recognized as indigenous to Texas, they are protected by Texas law, which prohibits the hunting, selling, collection, or possession of the species.

== Taxonomy ==
Nerodia paucimaculata was originally considered to be a subspecies of the Brazos water snake, N. harteri, but was elevated to full species status by Densmore et al. in 1992.

== Description ==
The Concho water snake grows to a total length (including tail) of 16 to 32 inches (41–81 cm), and looks very much like N. harteri. However, N. paucimaculata tends to be more red in color, and has no dark markings on the underside.
