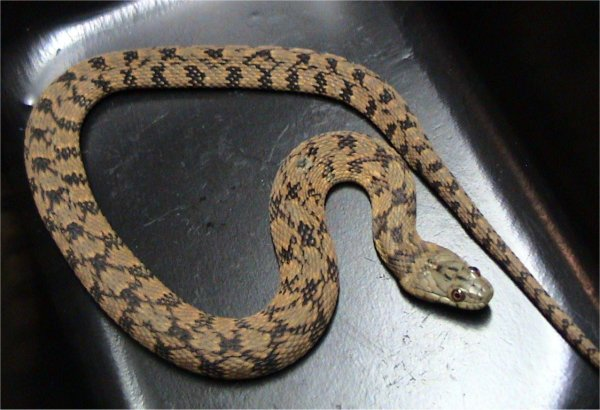
- Nerodia rhombifer, diamondback water snake

Scientific classification
- Domain: Eukaryota
- Kingdom: Animalia
- Phylum: Chordata
- Class: Reptilia
- Order: Squamata
- Suborder: Serpentes
- Family: Colubridae
- Subfamily: Natricinae
- Genus: Nerodia; Baird & Girard, 1853

Synonyms
- Clonophis, Coluber, Ischnognathus, Natrix, Regina, Storeria, Tropidoclonion, Tropidonothus, Tropidonotus, Vipera

= Nerodia =

Genus of reptiles

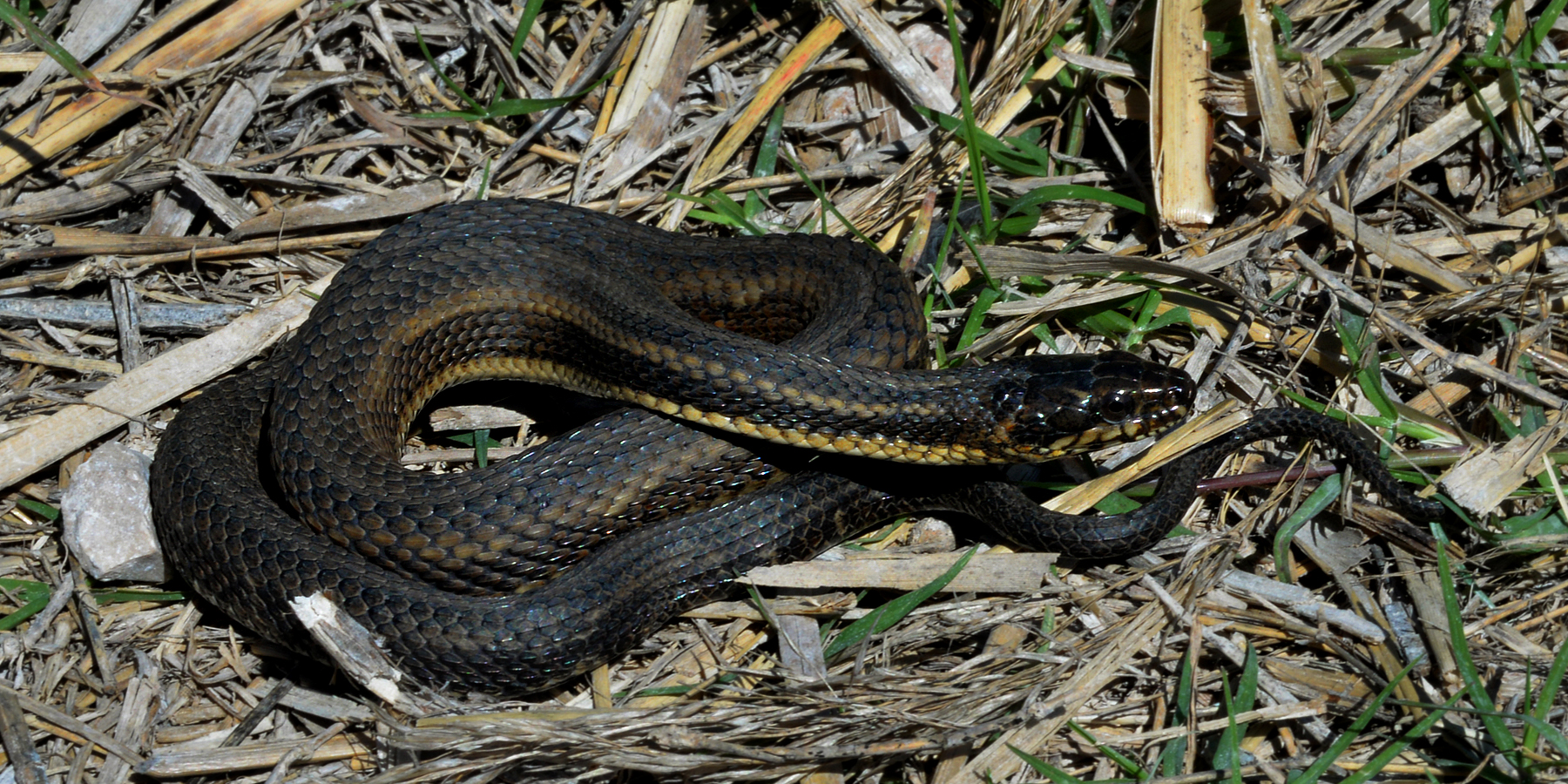
Gulf saltmarsh watersnake (Nerodia clarkii clarkii), Chambers County, Texas, 20 April 2019

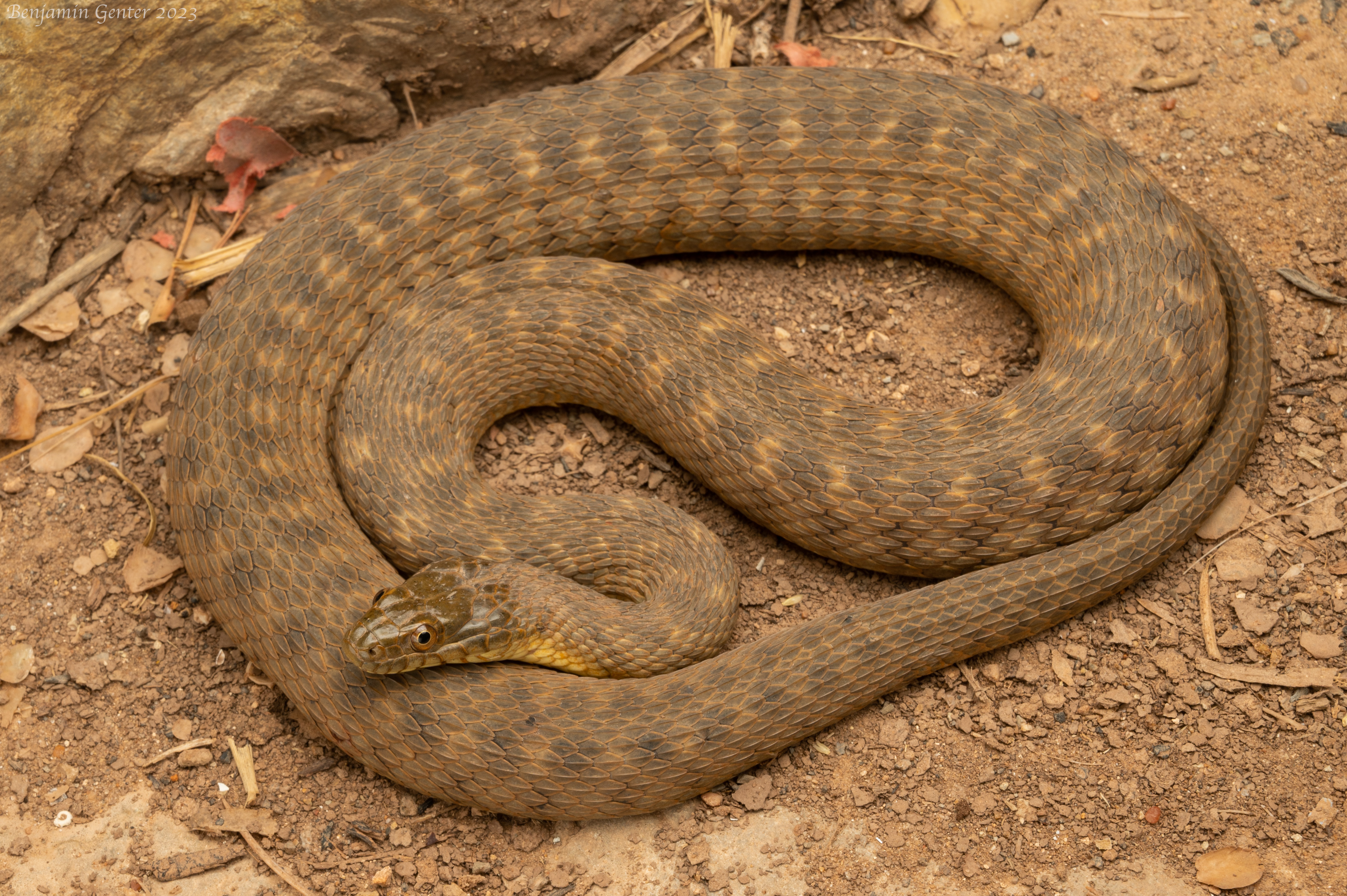
Concho Watersnake (Nerodia paucimaculata) from central Texas

Nerodia is a genus of nonvenomous colubrid snakes commonly referred to as water snakes due to their aquatic behavior. The genus includes nine species, all native to North America. Five of the species have recognized subspecies.

== Description ==
Nerodia species vary greatly, but all are relatively heavy-bodied snakes, sometimes growing to 1.2 m (4 feet) or longer in total length (including tail). They have flattened heads, with small eyes that have round pupils, and keeled dorsal scales. Species like N. fasciata display distinct banding, whereas other species, like N. erythrogaster, have blotching, and those like N. rhombifer have diamond-shaped patterning. Most species are brown or olive green, or some combination thereof with markings being brown, or black. Yellow or cream-colored accenting is common.

== Behavior ==
As the common name water snakes implies, species in the genus Nerodia are largely aquatic. They spend the vast majority of their time in or very near permanent sources of water. Often, they can be found basking on tree branches that overhang slow-moving streams or ponds.

== Diet ==
The primary diet of Nerodia species is fish and amphibians, and they are quite adept at catching both in their aquatic environment. They will also consume small reptiles and rodents that live near water.

== Defense ==
While their initial instinct is to flee when disturbed, water snakes of the genus Nerodia readily defend themselves if they are unable to escape. They do not often hesitate to strike or bite if handled, and often expel a foul-smelling musk from their cloacae.

== Reproduction ==
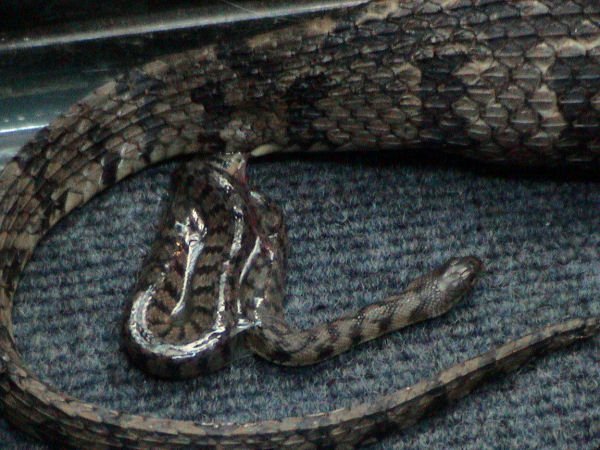
Nerodia rhombifer, diamondback water snake, giving birth

Nerodia species are viviparous, breeding in the spring and giving birth in the late summer or early fall. They are capable of having 90 or more young, but broods generally are much smaller. Neonates are around 20–26 centimetres (8–10 in) in length.

== Species and subspecies ==
These species and subspecies are recognized as being valid:

- Nerodia clarkii (Baird & Girard, 1853) – salt marsh snake
  - N. c. clarkii (Baird & Girard, 1853)
  - N. c. compressicauda (Kennicott, 1860)
  - N. c. taeniata (Cope, 1859)
- Nerodia cyclopion (A.M.C. Duméril, Bibron & A.H.A. Duméril, 1854) – green water snake
- Nerodia erythrogaster (Forster, 1771) – plainbelly water snake
  - N. e. alta (Conant, 1963)
  - N. e. bogerti (Conant, 1953)
  - N. e. erythrogaster (Forster, 1771)
  - N. e. flavigaster (Conant, 1949)
  - N. e. neglecta (Conant, 1949) – copperbelly water snake or copperbelly
  - N. e. transversa (Hallowell, 1852) – blotched water snake

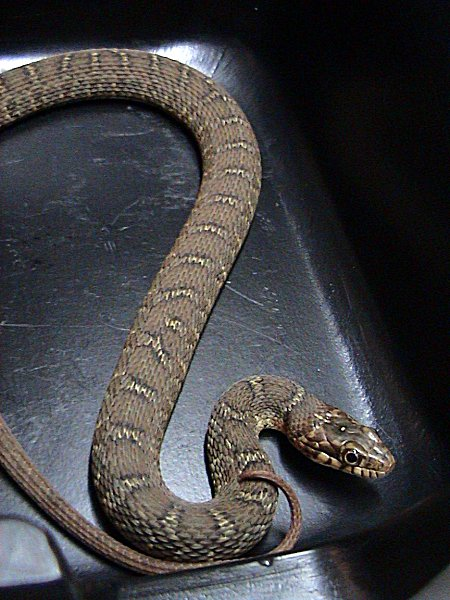
N. e. transversa

- Nerodia fasciata (Linnaeus, 1766) – banded water snake
  - N. f. confluens (Blanchard, 1923)
  - N. f.fasciata (Linnaeus, 1766)
  - N. f. pictiventris (Cope, 1895)
- Nerodia floridana (Goff, 1936) – Florida green watersnake
- Nerodia harteri (Trapido, 1941) – Brazos water snake
- Nerodia paucimaculata (Tinkle & Conant, 1961) – Concho water snake
- Nerodia rhombifer (Hallowell, 1852) – diamondback water snake
  - N. r. blanchardi (Clay, 1938)
  - N. r. rhombifer (Hallowell, 1852)
  - N. r. werleri (Conant, 1953)
- Nerodia sipedon (Linnaeus, 1758) – common water snake
  - N. s. insularum (Conant & Clay, 1937)
  - N. s. pleuralis (Cope, 1892)
  - N. s. sipedon (Linnaeus, 1758)
  - N. s. williamengelsi (Conant & Lazell, 1973)
- Nerodia taxispilota (Holbrook, 1842) – brown water snake

== Geographic distribution ==
Nerodia species are widely spread throughout the southern and eastern half of the United States, north into Canada and south into Mexico, as well as to the island of Cuba. Many ranges overlap, and intergrading of subspecies is not unknown, but is rare. Two species of Nerodia are invasive in the southwest US.

- N. clarkii – around the Gulf of Mexico (Florida, Louisiana, Mississippi, Texas) and Cuba
- N. cyclopion – Texas, Louisiana, Arkansas, Missouri, Illinois, Mississippi, Alabama, Georgia, Florida, South Carolina, Tennessee, and Kentucky
- N. erythrogaster – Texas, Oklahoma, Kansas, Louisiana, Arkansas, Missouri, Mississippi, Alabama, Georgia, Florida, South Carolina, North Carolina, Illinois, Indiana, Ohio, Michigan, Iowa, Delaware and into Mexico (Durango, Zacatecas, Coahuila, and Nuevo León)
- N. fasciata – Texas, Louisiana, Oklahoma, Arkansas, Mississippi, Alabama, Florida, Georgia, South Carolina, North Carolina, Missouri, and Illinois
- N. harteri – west-central Texas
- N. paucimaculata – Central Texas
- N. rhombifer – Texas, Oklahoma, Kansas, Louisiana, Arkansas, Missouri, Illinois, Indiana, Tennessee, Mississippi, and Alabama, as well as south into Mexico (Coahuila, Nuevo León, Tamaulipas, and Veracruz)
- N. sipedon – Colorado, Nebraska, Kansas, Oklahoma, Iowa, Missouri, Arkansas, Minnesota, Wisconsin, Illinois, Tennessee, Louisiana, Mississippi, Alabama, Georgia, Florida, South Carolina, North Carolina, Kentucky, West Virginia, Virginia, Indiana, Ohio, Pennsylvania, New York, Vermont, New Hampshire, Maine, Massachusetts, Rhode Island, Connecticut, New Jersey, Delaware, Maryland, Michigan, and north into Canada
- N. taxispilota – Florida, Alabama, Georgia, South Carolina, North Carolina, and Virginia

== In captivity ==
Due to how widespread and extremely common they are in the wild, water snakes of the genus Nerodia are often found in the exotic pet trade, throughout the United States, though they are rarely captive bred. Their relative physical plainness, compared to other available pet snake species, and their propensity to bite make them less than attractive pets to most people. They are easy to care for, though, and do quite well in captivity.

== Conservation concerns ==
Some Nerodia species, such as N. harteri and N. paucimaculata are only found in very isolated localities and are protected by state laws, but the majority of Nerodia species hold no specific conservation status. Due to their habitat choice, defensive disposition, and vague similarity to the venomous cottonmouth (Agkistrodon piscivorus), they are frequently mistaken for them. This results in many more water snakes being killed every year than cottonmouths. Often, water snakes found in areas where the cottonmouth does not range are still killed by humans out of ignorance and fear.
