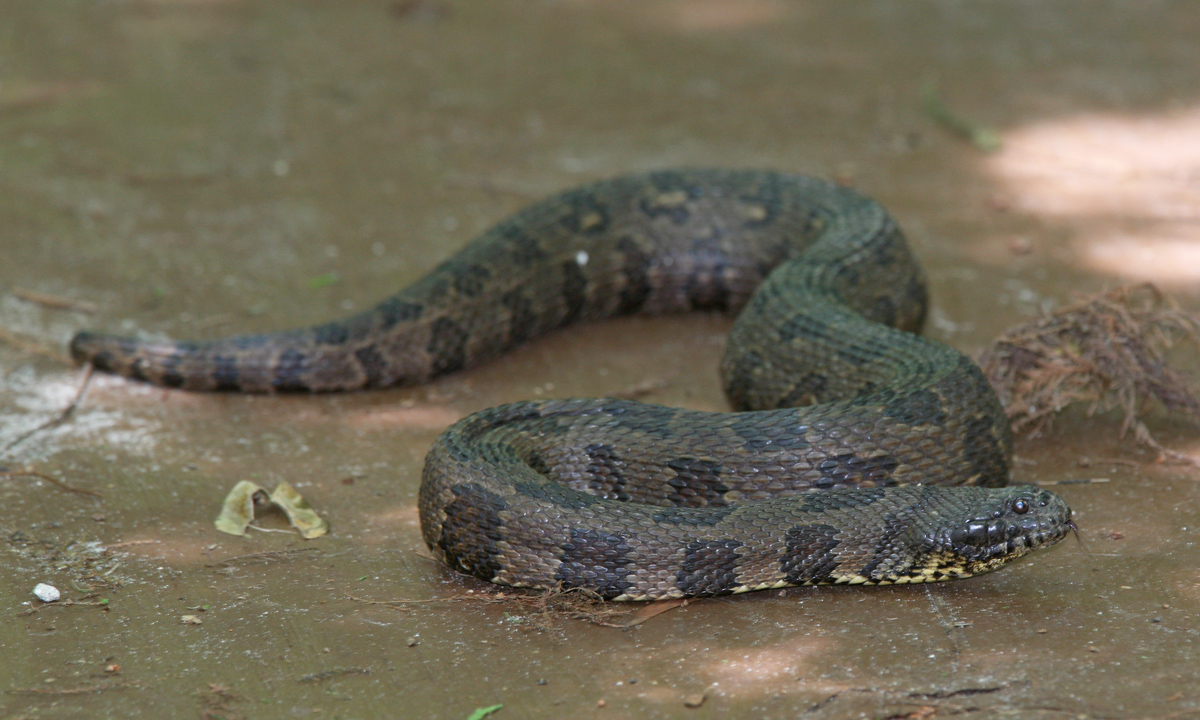
- Nerodia taxispilota in West Palm Beach, Florida

Conservation status
- Least Concern (IUCN 3.1)

Scientific classification
- Kingdom: Animalia
- Phylum: Chordata
- Class: Reptilia
- Order: Squamata
- Suborder: Serpentes
- Family: Colubridae
- Genus: Nerodia
- Species: N. taxispilota

Binomial name
- Nerodia taxispilota (Holbrook, 1842)
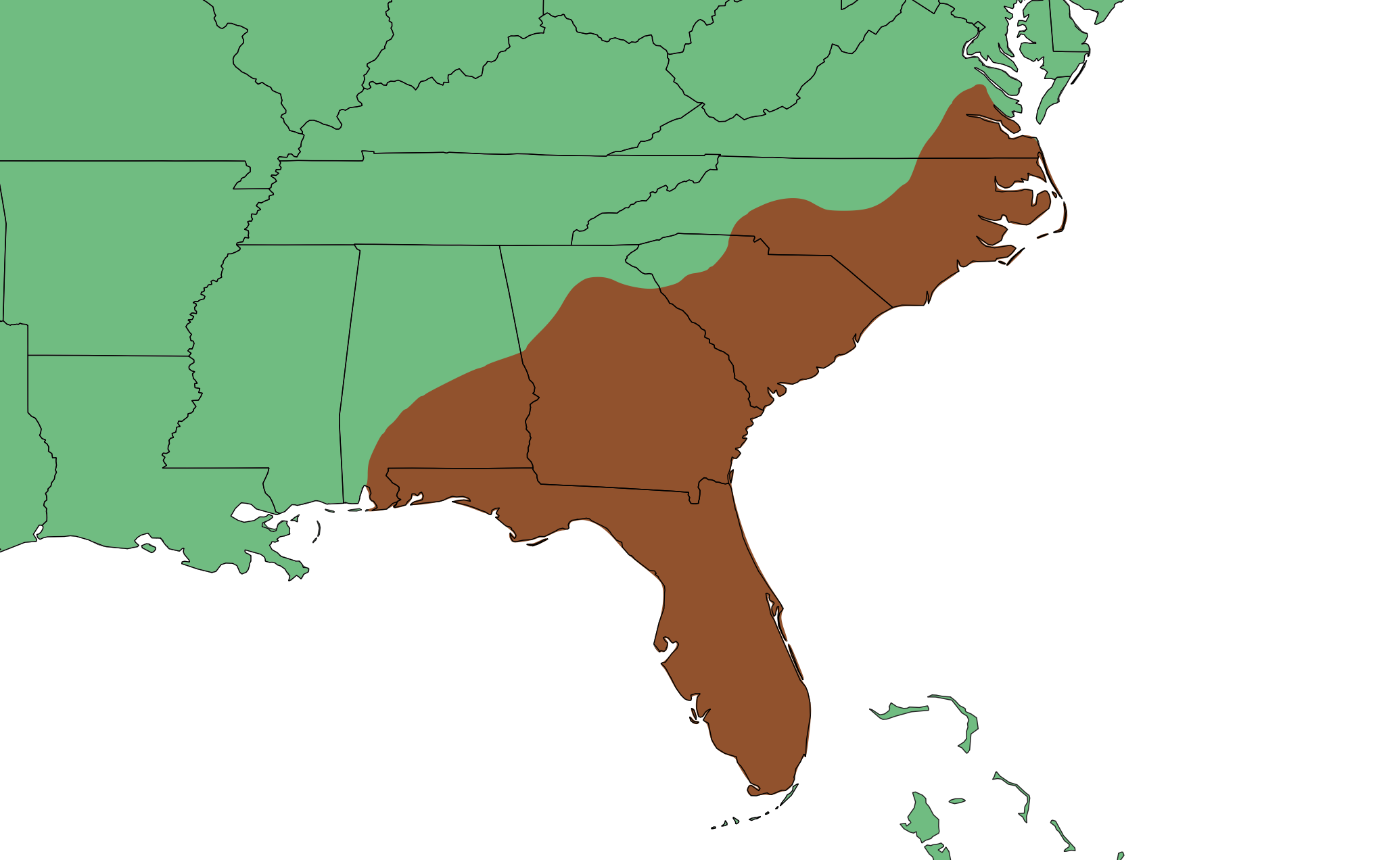

Synonyms
- Tropidonotus taxispilotus Holbrook, 1842; Natrix taxispilota — Cope, 1889; Nerodia taxispilota — Conant & Collins, 1991

= Brown water snake =

Species of snake

The brown water snake (Nerodia taxispilota) is a large species of nonvenomous natricine snake endemic to the southeastern United States. This snake is often one of the most abundant species of snakes found in rivers and streams of the southeastern United States, yet many aspects of its natural history are poorly known. Due to abundance and distribution throughout its biological range, this species could be used to investigate anthropogenic impacts on aquatic ecosystems by studying their movements.

Lycodonomorphus rufulus is sometimes also called the brown water snake, but L. rufulus is found in South Africa.

== Common names ==
Its common names include brown water snake, water-pilot, aspic, false moccasin, great water snake, pied water snake, southern water snake, and water rattle.

== Geographic range ==
Nerodia taxispilota is found in lower coastal regions from southeastern Virginia, through North Carolina, South Carolina, and Georgia, to northern and western Florida (Gulf Coast), then west through Alabama, and Mississippi, to Louisiana, normally from sea level to 500 ft. (150 m) elevation.

== Description ==
The brown water snake is very heavy-bodied, and its neck is distinctly narrower than its head. Dorsally, it is brown or rusty brown with a row of about 25 black or dark brown, square blotches down its back. Smaller similar blotches alternate on the sides. Ventrally, it is yellow, heavily marked with black or dark brown. Dorsal scales are in 27–33 rows (more than any other North American water snake), and it has two to four anterior temporals (usually one in others). Adults measure 30–60 in. (76–152 cm) in total length; record 69 in. (175 cm).

== Habitat ==
Nerodia taxispilota is found in swamps and streams and is often mistaken for a moccasin. N. taxispilota are widely distributed in the coastal and piedmont regions of the Southeastern United States. More commonly found in flowing water such as rivers, canals, and black water cypress creeks N. taxispilota can also be found in large water reservoirs and lakes. Their preference of a pescatarian diet keeps them from living in ephemeral wetlands. These snakes are beginning to be used as a bioindicator of Mercury(Hg) accumulation in wetland ecosystems.

== Reproduction ==
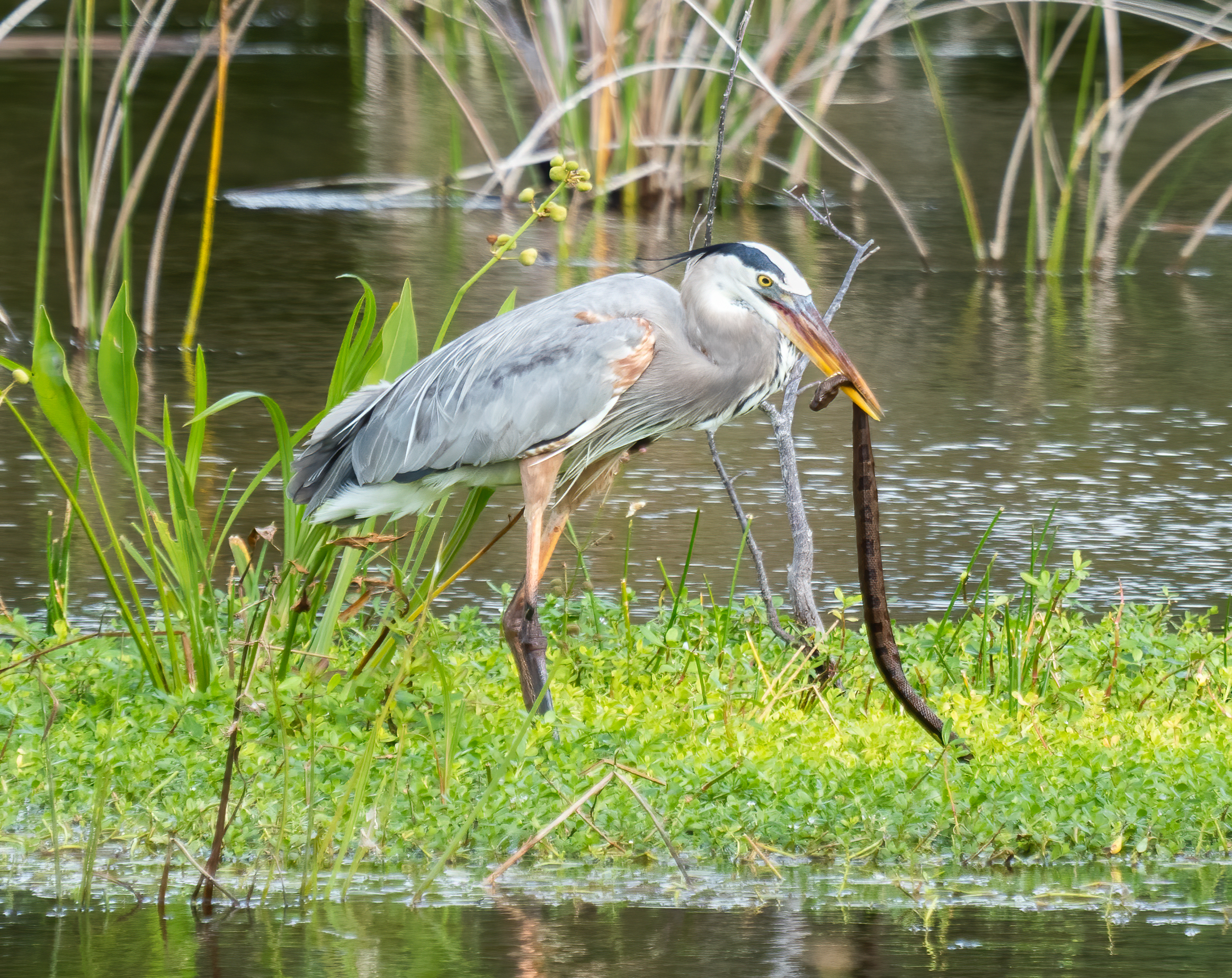
Birds like this great blue heron are among the snake's predators

Nerodia taxispilota is ovoviviparous. Mating takes place in the spring on land or on tree branches. On average, adult females are larger than adult males. The young are born alive, usually in August, in broods of 14–58, more commonly 30–40. The newborns are 7–10¾ in (18–27 cm) long, with males longer than females, opposite of adults.

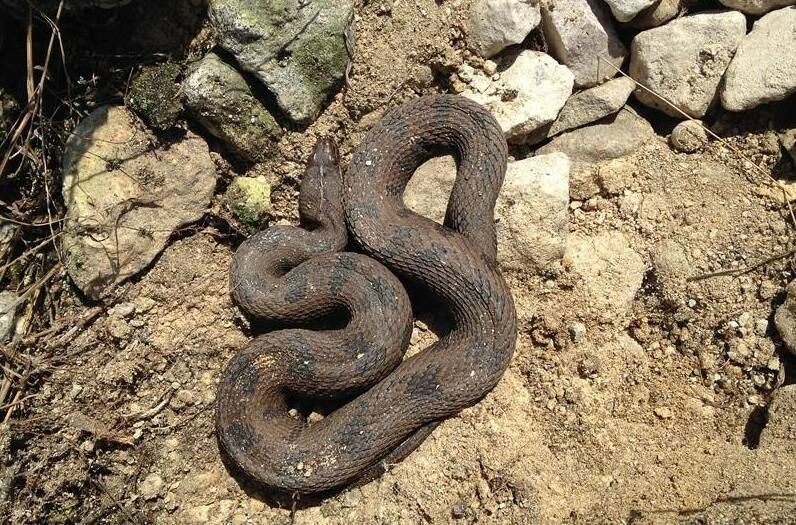
brown water snake (Nerodia taxispilota)
