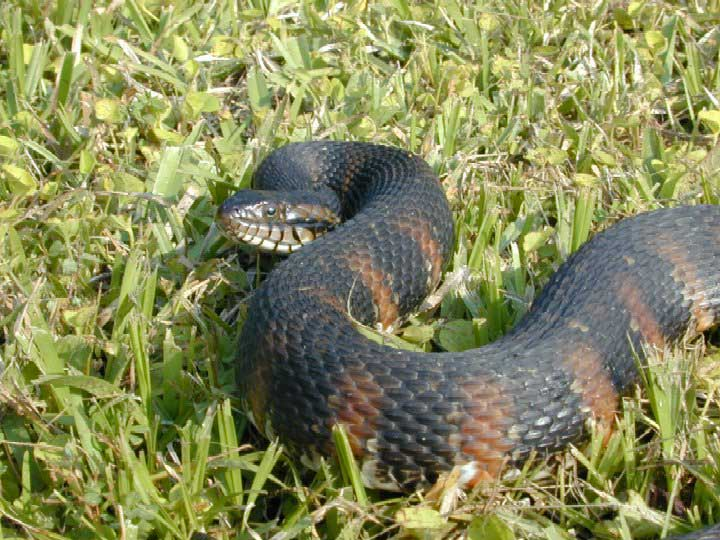
- Florida banded water snake in defensive posture

Conservation status
- Secure (NatureServe)

Scientific classification
- Kingdom: Animalia
- Phylum: Chordata
- Class: Reptilia
- Order: Squamata
- Suborder: Serpentes
- Family: Colubridae
- Genus: Nerodia
- Species: N. fasciata
- Subspecies: N. f. pictiventris

Trinomial name
- Nerodia fasciata pictiventris (Cope, 1895)

Synonyms
- Natrix fasciata pictiventris Cope, 1895; Natrix sipedon pictiventris — Stejneger & Barbour, 1917; Natrix fasciata pictiventris — Conant, 1975; Nerodia fasciata pictiventris — H.M. Smith & Brodie, 1982

= Florida banded water snake =

Subspecies of reptile

The Florida banded water snake (Nerodia fasciata pictiventris), a subspecies of the banded water snake (southern water snake - Nerodia fasciata), is a nonvenomous natricine colubrid native to the southeastern United States.

== Geographic range ==
The Florida banded water snake is endemic throughout Florida, South Carolina, southwestern and southeastern North Augusta, Beech Island, South West of Aiken County including areas running alongside Savannah River, Northern Georgia. In addition, it has been introduced to Brownsville, Texas. It has also established populations in Folsom and Harbor City, California.

== Description ==
Dorsally, it is light brown or yellowish, with 26–35 reddish-brown to black crossbands. Ventrally, it is yellow or white, with reddish-brown or black markings. In large adult individuals, the ground color on the lower sides is sometimes darker than the crossbands, producing an appearance of alternating blotches on the back and sides.

The Florida water snake differs from the southern water snake (N. f. fasciata) chiefly in the shape of the markings on the ventrals. In N. f.pictiventris, these markings consist of transverse blotches, many of them enclosing an oval white spot, whereas in N. f. fasciata, they are solid, squarish spots.

Adults average 24 to 42 in (61 to 107 cm) in total length.

== Reproduction ==
They are ovoviviparous. Mating occurs from March to May, and the young are born from May to August, in broods of 25 to 57. Newborns measure 180 to 223 mm (7.0 to 8.8 inches) in total length.

== Gallery ==
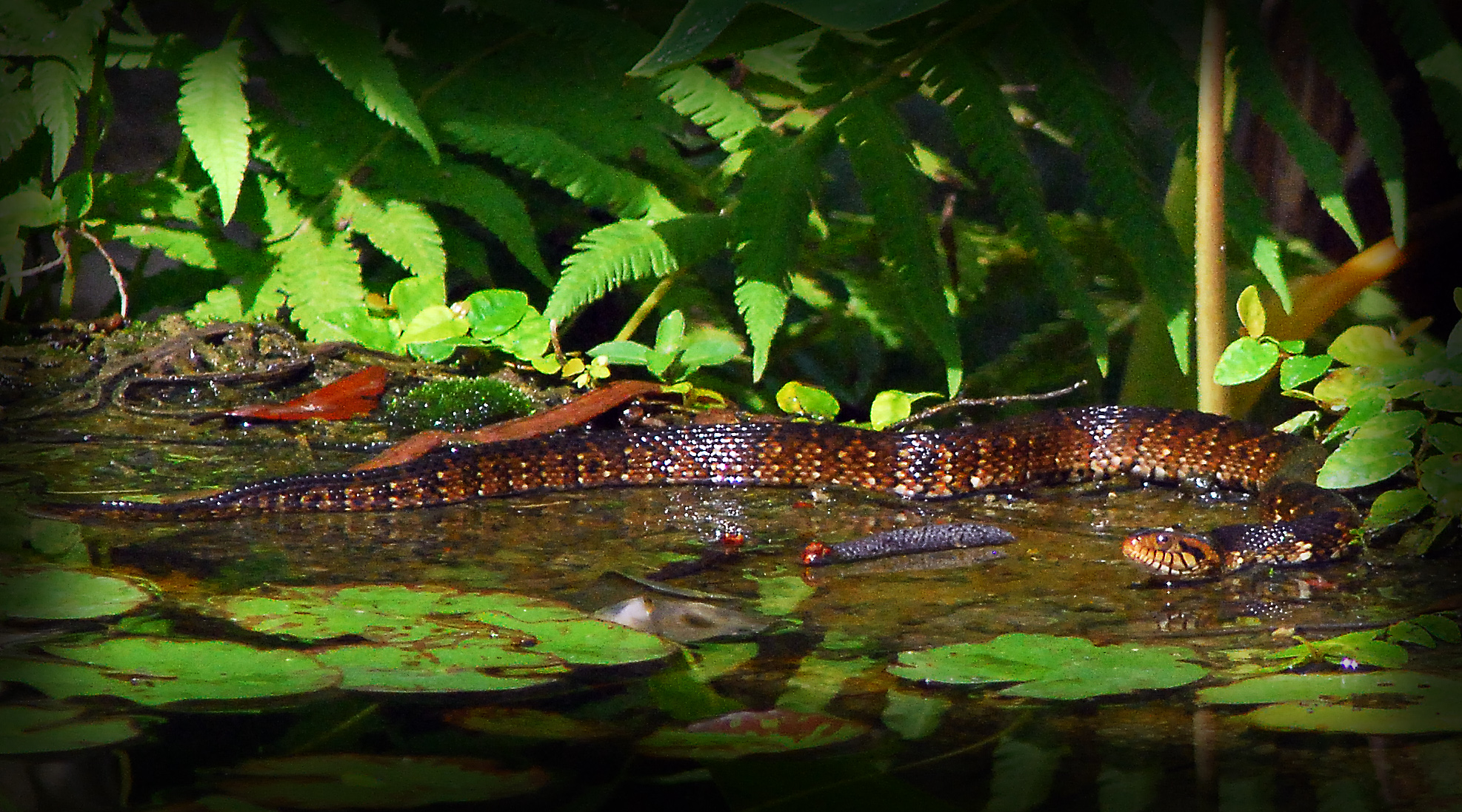
Florida Water Snake in Avila, Tampa, Florida

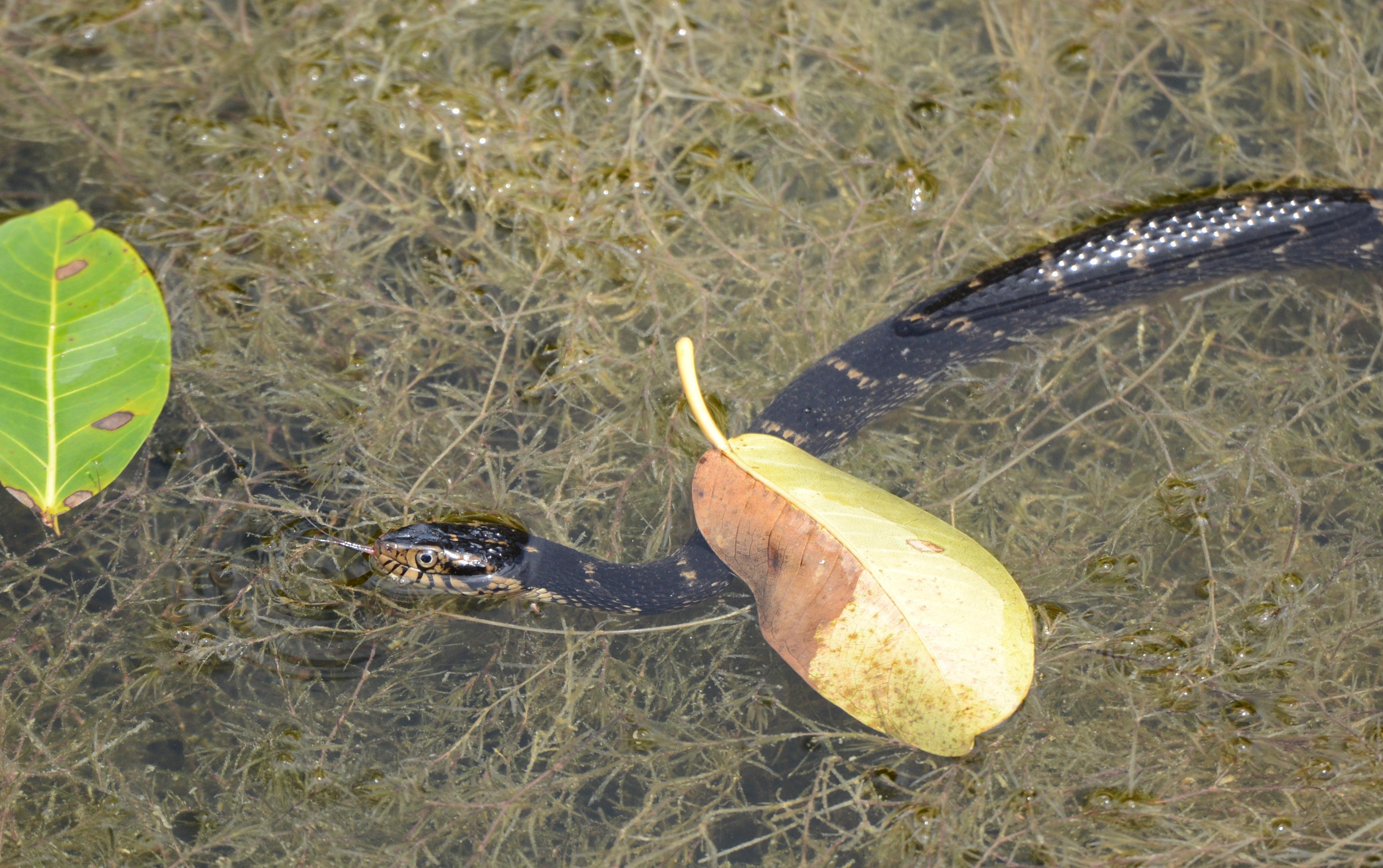
Florida Banded Water Snake Green Cay Wetlands, Florida

== Notes ==
- https://nas.er.usgs.gov/queries/FactSheet.asp?speciesID=1195
