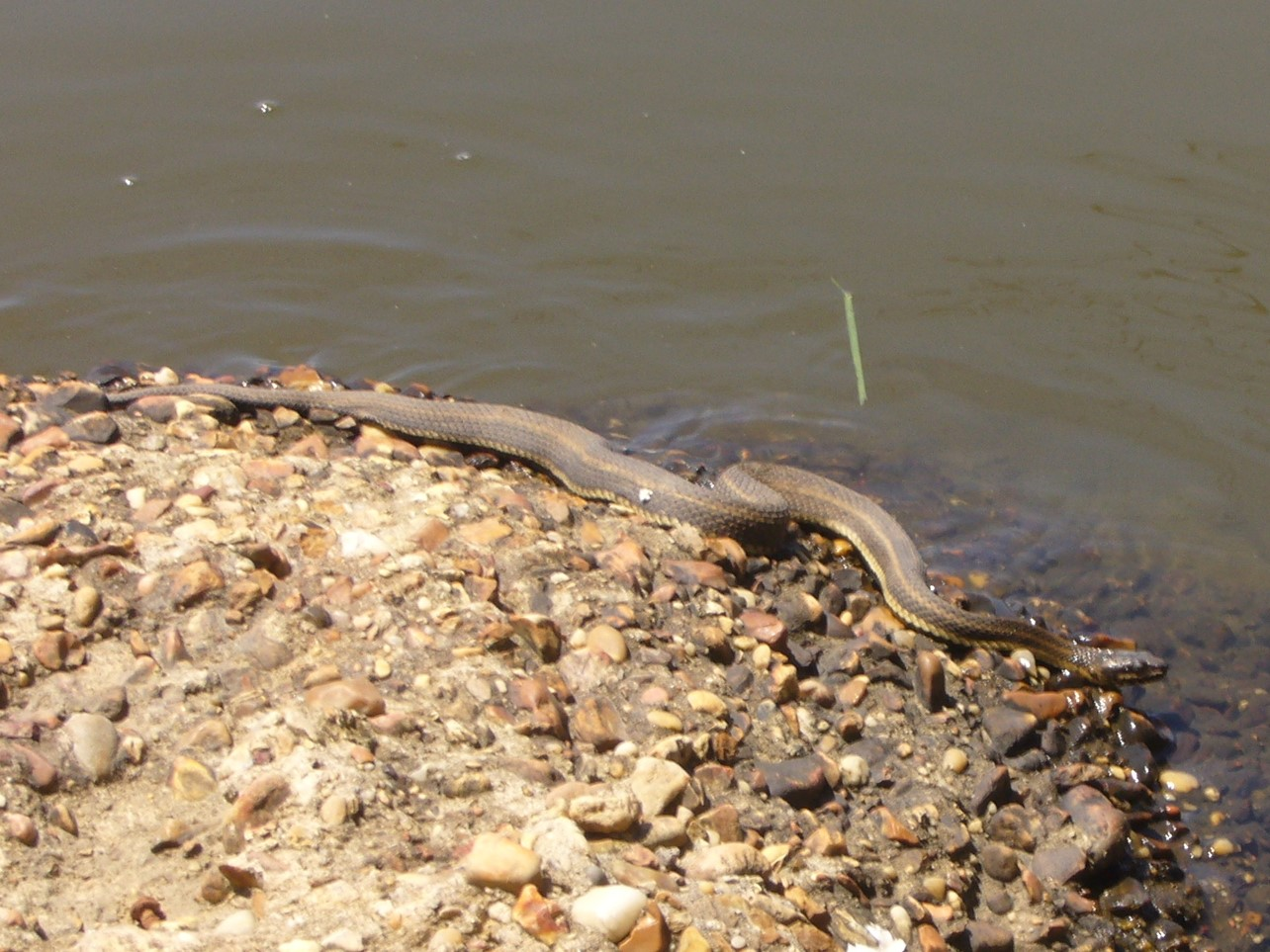

Conservation status
- Vulnerable (NatureServe)

Scientific classification
- Kingdom: Animalia
- Phylum: Chordata
- Class: Reptilia
- Order: Squamata
- Suborder: Serpentes
- Family: Colubridae
- Genus: Nerodia
- Species: N. clarkii
- Subspecies: N. c. clarkii

Trinomial name
- Nerodia clarkii clarkii Baird & Girard, 1853

Synonyms
- Regina clarkii Baird & Girard, 1853; Tropidonotus clarkii — Cope, 1861; Natrix clarkii — M.J. Allen, 1932; Natrix sipedon clarki — Conant, 1958; Natrix fasciata clarki — Conant, 1975; Nerodia clarkii clarkii — Conant & Collins

= Nerodia clarkii clarkii =

Gulf salt marsh snake

Subspecies of snake

Nerodia clarkii clarkii, the Gulf salt marsh snake, is a subspecies of N. clarkii that is indigenous to the south-eastern United States. It is a nonvenomous, colubrid snake that inhabits coastal salt marshes and brackish estuaries along the coast of the Gulf of Mexico from Florida to Texas.

== Description ==
The Gulf salt marsh snake is a moderately stout aquatic snake. Adult specimens attain an average total length (including tail) of 38 to 51 cm (15 to 20 in), with the record maximum total length at 91.4 cm (36.0 in). The color pattern in this subspecies is variable, but adults tend to have a dorsum that ranges from dark gray to reddish-brown with four yellowish longitudinal stripes down the body, two on each side. The belly is dark gray to reddish-brown with one to three rows of pale spots.

== Reproduction ==
The Gulf salt marsh snake reaches sexual maturity at three years. Females give birth to 2-44 live young that range from 17.7 to 22.8 centimetres (7.0 to 9.0 in) in total length. Their typical lifespan is up to 20 years.

== Diet ==
N. c. clarkii is primarily nocturnal, preying upon small fish, crabs, shrimp, and other invertebrates that become trapped in tidal pools during low tide.

== See also ==
- Nerodia clarkii
