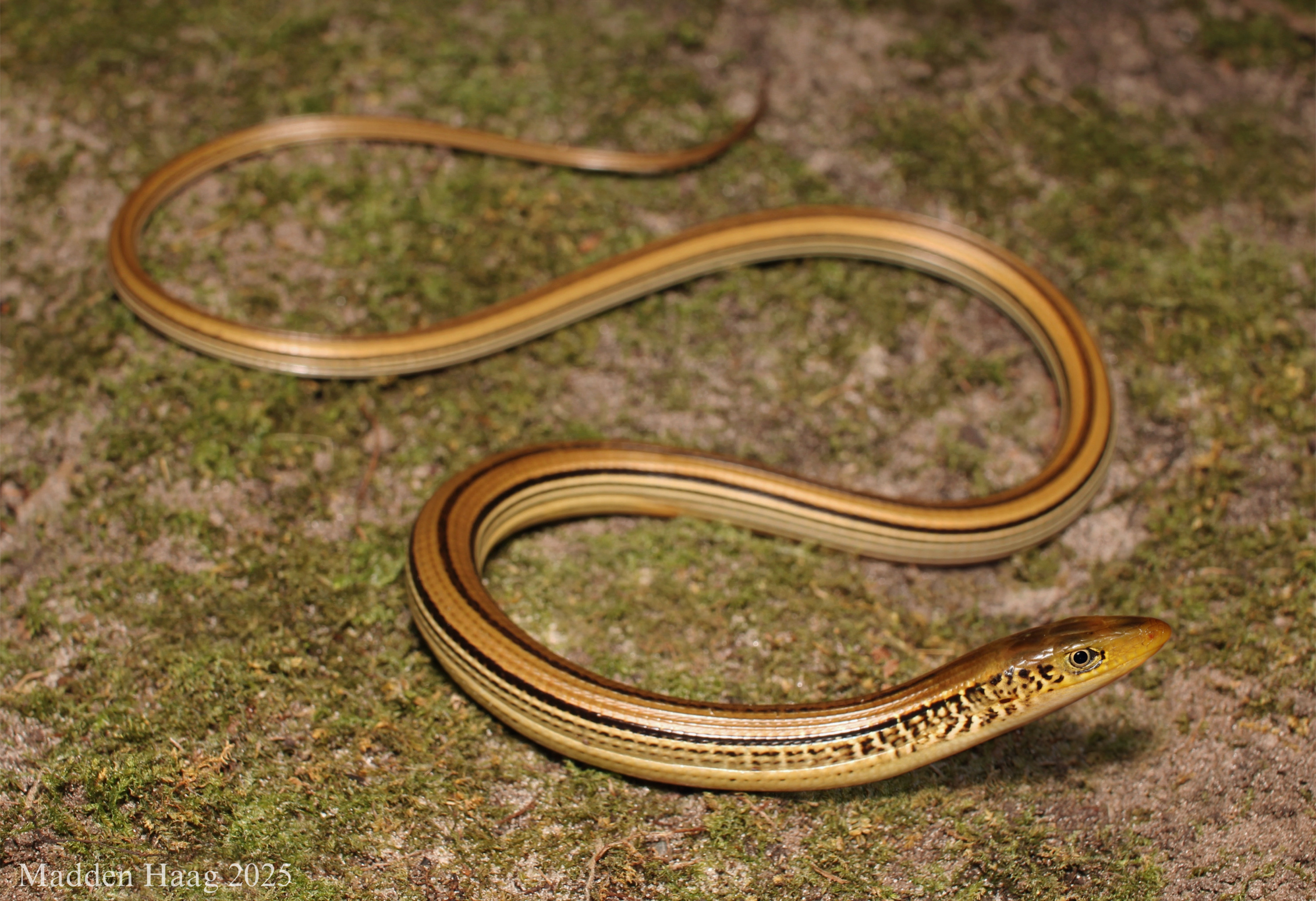
- Mimic glass lizard (Ophisaurus mimicus)
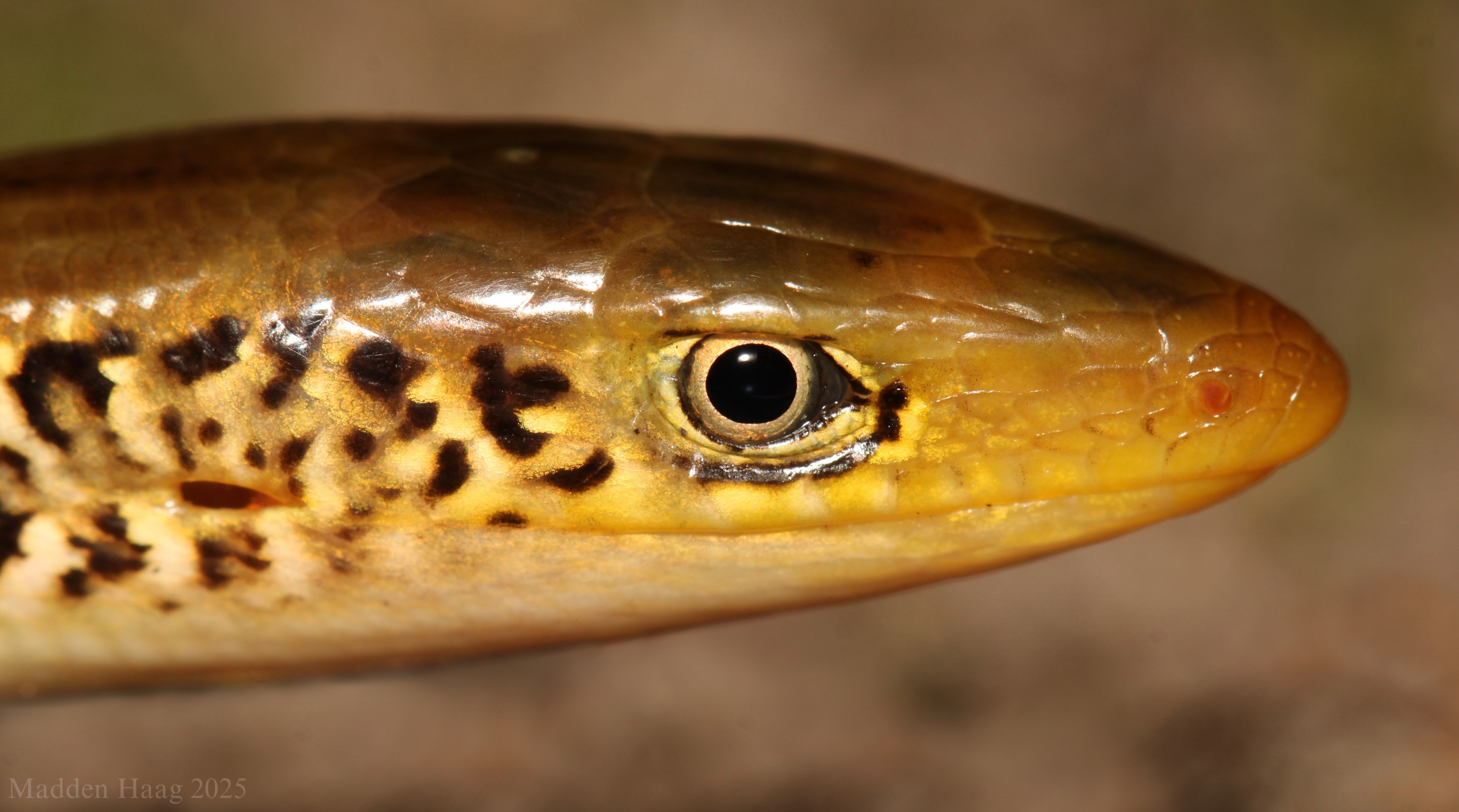
- Mimic glass lizard face (Ophisaurus mimicus)

Conservation status
- Least Concern (IUCN 3.1)

Scientific classification
- Kingdom: Animalia
- Phylum: Chordata
- Class: Reptilia
- Order: Squamata
- Suborder: Anguimorpha
- Family: Anguidae
- Genus: Ophisaurus
- Species: O. mimicus

Binomial name
- Ophisaurus mimicus Palmer, 1987
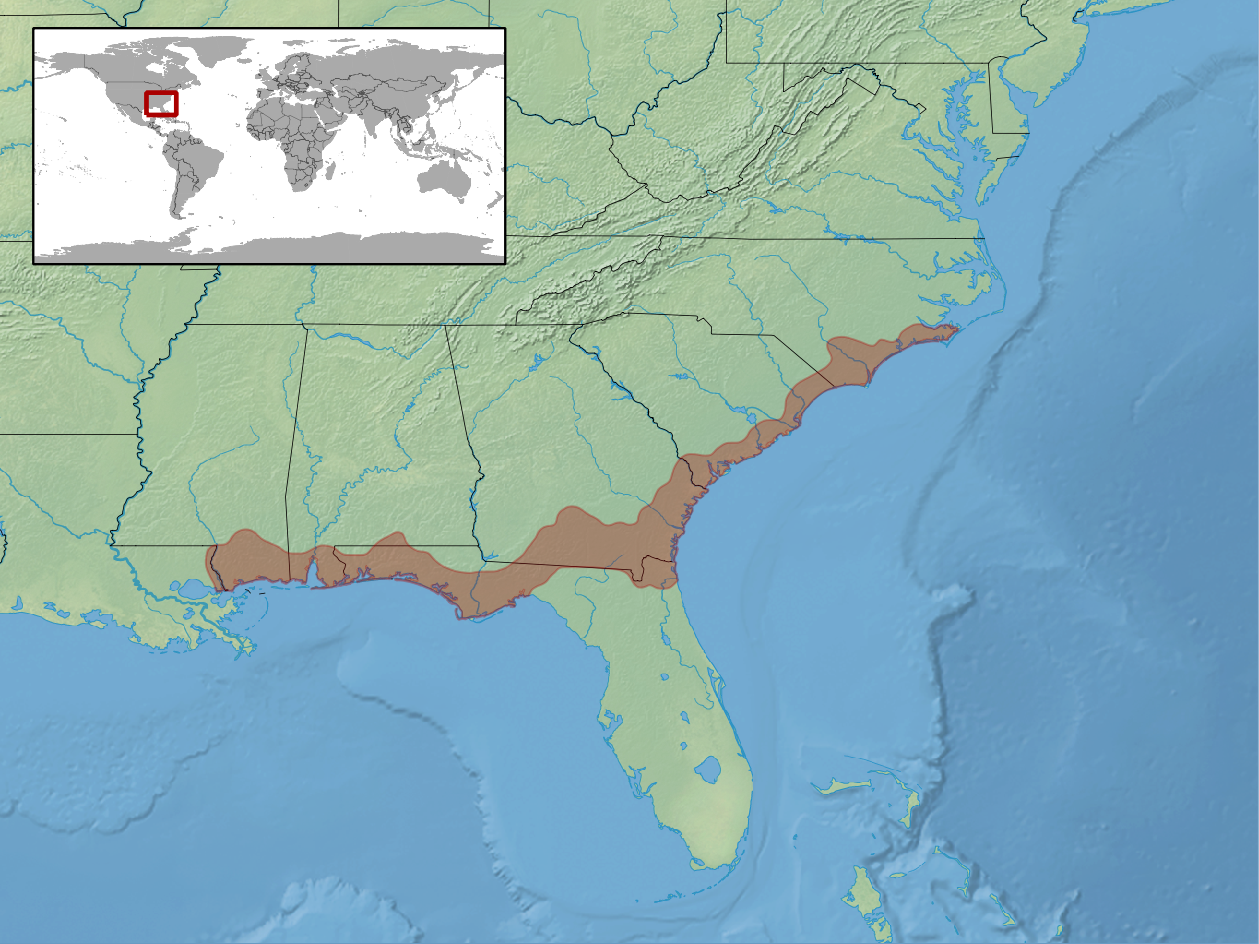

= Mimic glass lizard =

Species of reptile

The mimic glass lizard (Ophisaurus mimicus) is a species of lizard in the family Anguidae. The species is endemic to the Southeastern United States. The mimic glass lizard is dark brown to black with a dark middorsal stripe down the body and on most of the tail. They have 3-4 dark stripes separated by pale stripes above the lateral grooves. They have a very distinct anatomy of the axis specifically when it comes to their second vertebra which could be attributed to an ecological adaptation, feeding, and/or defensive behavior that requires high head and neck mobility.

== Geographic range ==
Ophiosaurus mimicus was historically found in parts of Florida, Georgia, Mississippi, North Carolina, and South Carolina, although recent observations are confined to very small patches of remaining habitat in Florida, North Carolina, and Alabama. They are narrowly associated with longleaf pine forests where they tend to prefer frequently burned areas with seasonally saturated soils. Wet prairies and open-canopied seepage slopes seem to be especially important for supporting populations.

== Diet ==
The mimic glass lizard feeds on insects and other invertebrates.
