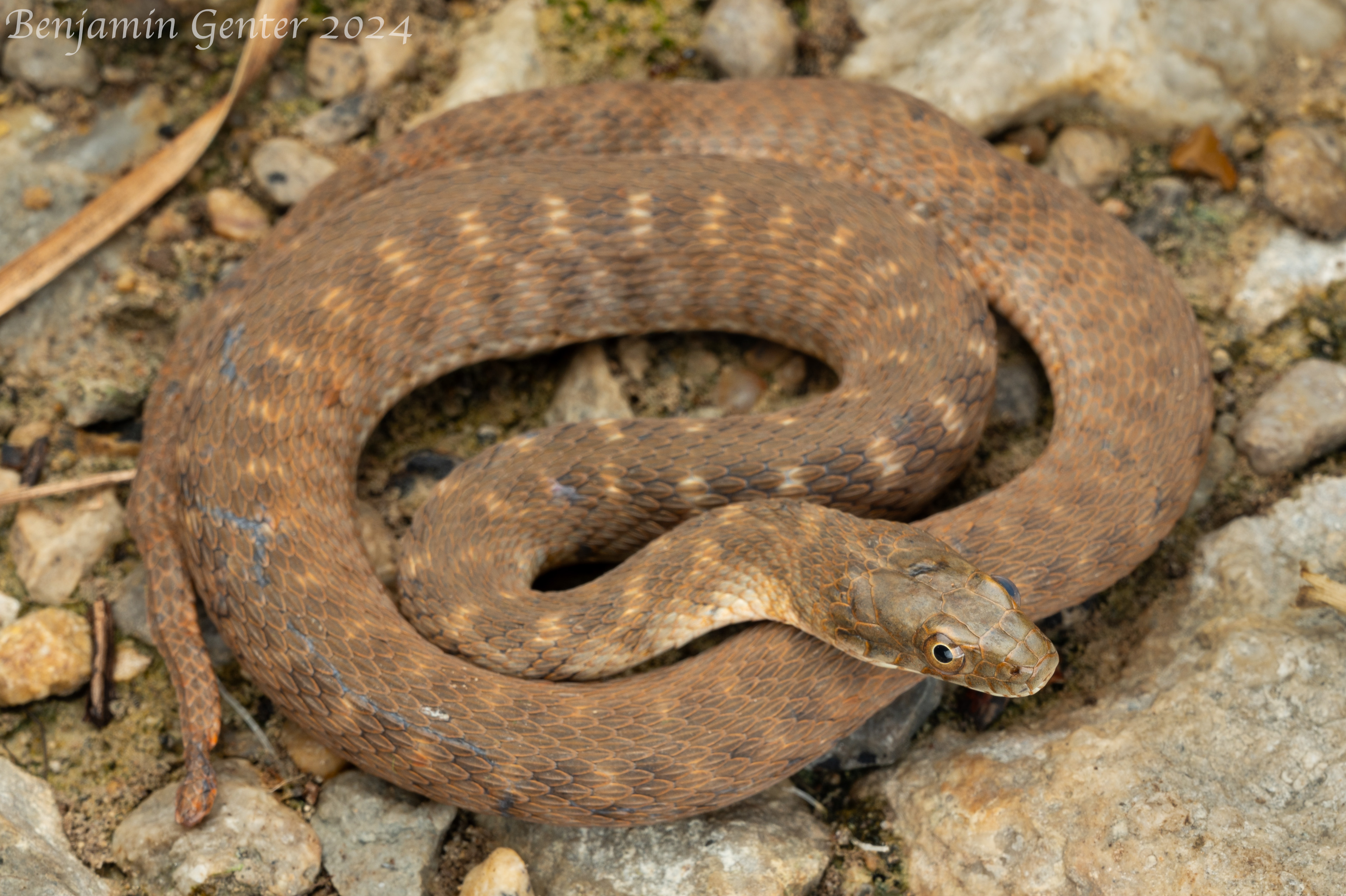

Conservation status
- Near Threatened (IUCN 3.1)

Scientific classification
- Kingdom: Animalia
- Phylum: Chordata
- Class: Reptilia
- Order: Squamata
- Suborder: Serpentes
- Family: Colubridae
- Genus: Nerodia
- Species: N. harteri

Binomial name
- Nerodia harteri (Trapido, 1941)

Synonyms
- Natrix harteri Trapido, 1941; Nerodia harteri — Mecham, 1983

= Brazos water snake =

Species of snake

The Brazos water snake (Nerodia harteri), also called commonly Harter's water snake, is a species of mostly aquatic, nonvenomous snake in the family Colubridae. The species is endemic to Texas in the United States.

== Geographic range ==
Nerodia harteri is found only in Central Texas in the Brazos River system.

== Habitat ==
The preferred habitat of N. harteri is rocky areas along the Brazos River.

== Conservation status ==
Due to its limited range, N. harteri is considered to be a near-threatened species in Texas.

== Etymology ==
The specific name or epithet, harteri, is in honor of American amateur herpetologist Philip Harter, who collected the first specimen in Palo Pinto County in 1936.

== Description ==
The Brazos water snake grows to a total length (including tail) of 16 to 32 inches (41–81 cm), and ranges in color from brown to olive green. It has two rows of spots that go down either side of its back, and has a pink or orange underside with dark spots down either side.
