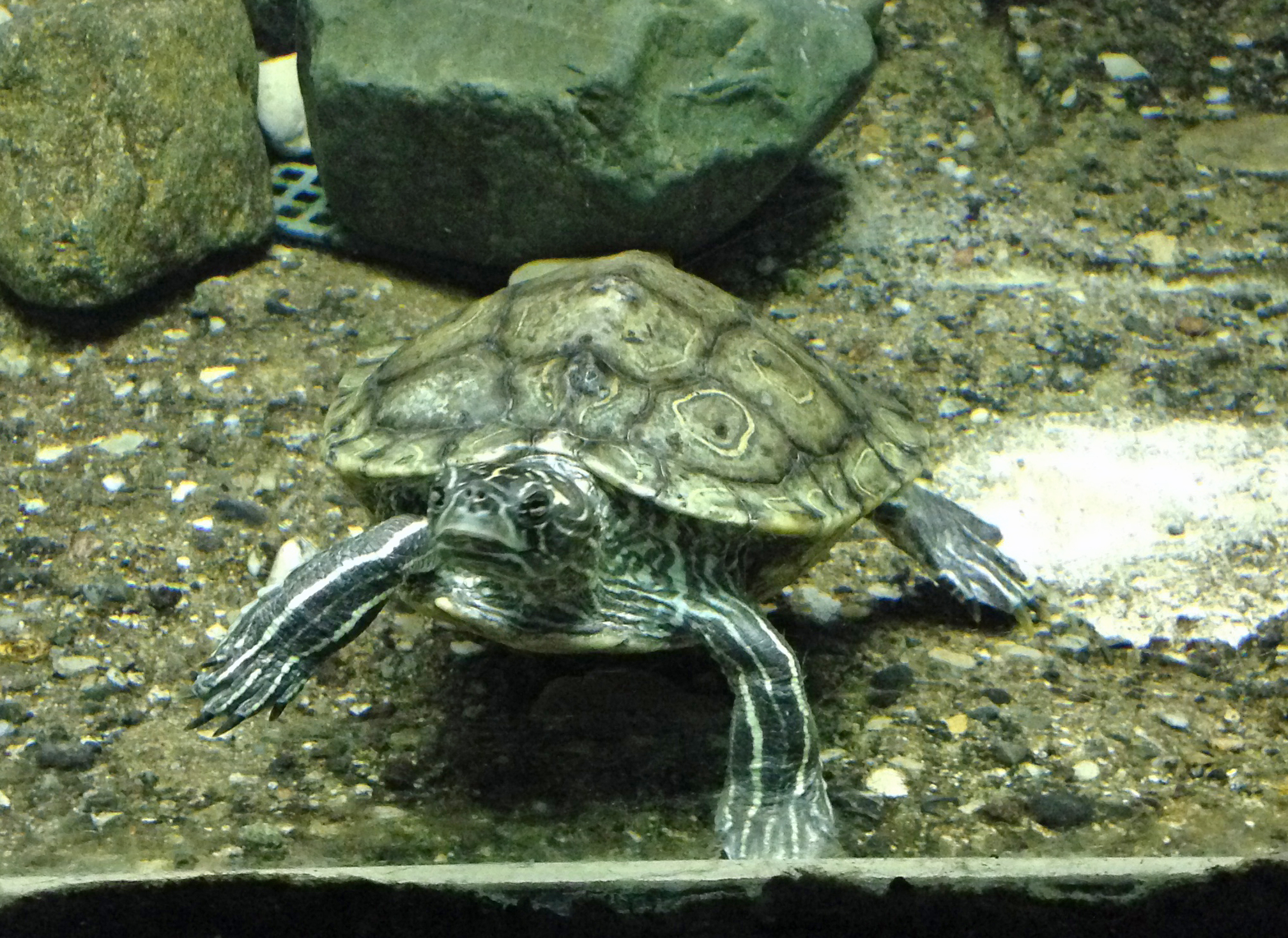
- Black-knobbed map turtle at Columbus Zoo and Aquarium

Conservation status
- Least Concern (IUCN 3.1)

- Vulnerable (NatureServe)

Scientific classification
- Kingdom: Animalia
- Phylum: Chordata
- Class: Reptilia
- Order: Testudines
- Suborder: Cryptodira
- Family: Emydidae
- Genus: Graptemys
- Species: G. nigrinoda

Binomial name
- Graptemys nigrinoda Cagle, 1954

Subspecies
- G. n. nigrinoda Cagle, 1954 (black-knobbed map turtle); G. n. delticola Folkerts & Mount, 1969 (delta map turtle)
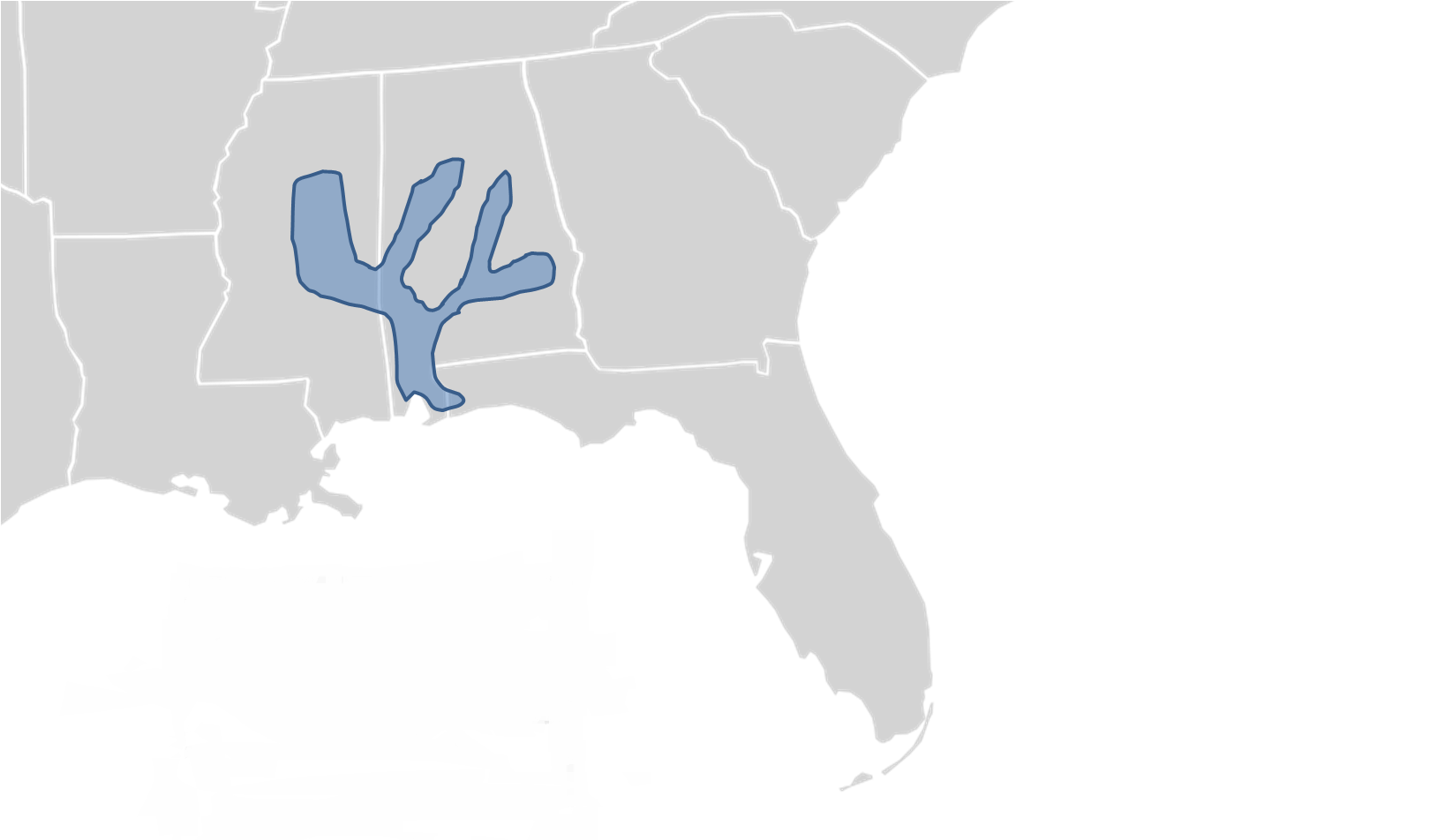
- Range map

Synonyms
- Graptemys nigrinoda nigrinoda: Graptemys oculifera nigrinoda — Mertens & Wermuth, 1955; Graptemys nigrinoda nigrinoda — Folkerts & Mount, 1969; Malaclemys nigrinoda — Cochran & Goin, 1970

= Black-knobbed map turtle =

Species of turtle

The black-knobbed map turtle (Graptemys nigrinoda), formerly known as the black-knobbed sawback, is a small to medium-sized aquatic turtle with light gray skin. Some of the most distinguishing characteristics of the black-knobbed map turtle, and the Graptemys genus, are the protruding "spikes" on the turtle's carapace. This species inhabits mainly the fall lines of rivers in the Mobile Bay drainage, in Alabama and Mississippi.

== Description ==
The carapace of G. nigrinoda is slightly domed with the first four vertebrae possessing backward-projecting, knob-like processes, which are black in color. The second and third processes are more dominant in size compared to the first and fourth. With aging females, the knobs are reduced to small swellings.

The carapace is dark olive-brown in color. Within each pleural, or "plate", of the shell are yellow-green circular rings which are outlined in black. Hatchlings are similar in color to adults, but the colors tend to be more vibrant and contrasting. The knob-like processes are compressed laterally.

The head is small, and is dark brown with yellow stripes, with yellow crescents behind the eye facing towards the posterior end of the turtle. These stripes continue on the legs of the turtle also, with the underside of the leg being lighter than the dorsal surface.

Sexual dimorphism is evident in this species. Females are roughly twice the size of males. Also, females' carapaces tend to be higher than those of males, though the males have longer tails than the females. Sizes (carapace lengths) have been recorded as ranging from 7.6 to 10.2 cm (3.0 to 4.0 in) in males and 10.2–19.1 cm (4.0–7.5 in) in females.

== Distribution ==
The black-knobbed map turtle is endemic to the southeastern United States. In Alabama, they are found in the Mobile Bay drainage. In Mississippi, they are found in the Tombigbee River system and in the Black Warrior River as far north as Jefferson County, Alabama. They are only able to survive in fresh water, thus they are only found within freshwater river systems.

== Habitat and ecology ==
Black-knobbed map turtles are seasonally active from April to late November. Basking is a routine part of their day, occurring in the early morning and early afternoon. Thermoregulation is thought to be the reason for basking, along with the removal of parasites and algal growth.

When approached, the turtles jump into the nearby water. Once in the water, they seek protection between the branches of fallen trees on the river bottom. Most of the riverbeds where they live have sand and clay bottoms with moderate currents. Hatchlings prefer more sluggish waters off the main channel.

Little is known about foraging behavior. However, this species has been observed to consume beetles and dragonflies that have fallen into the river. Upon examination of both female and male stomach matter, Lahanas found a distinction of food material percentages. Males had roughly 58% animal matter and 40% plant matter, while females had 70% animal matter and 29% plant matter. The three primary sources of animal matter came from freshwater sponges, bryozoans, and molluscs. The only plant matter found was a freshwater alga.

Males reach sexual maturity around 3–4 years and females reach it around 7–8 years. Females have a clutch size of roughly five eggs and can lay three or four clutches in a year. Nesting occurs from May to August, and occurs nocturnally on a sandbank. This species feeds primarily on insects.

== Conservation ==
Currently, this species has been petitioned and is under consideration for listing by the U.S. Fish and Wildlife Service in subcategory 3-C, and is classified as vulnerable by The Nature Conservancy. The black-knobbed map turtle is most likely threatened by habitat degradation and encroachment by humans. Humans have been known to remove dead logs that line the shoreline of rivers, which the turtle uses for basking in the sun. Also, indirect disturbances of nest sites may become an issue. Additionally, the turtle population could decline due to the consumption of their eggs by humans or other predators. Fishermen, though, in most cases not purposely, can kill turtles with their trotlines, gill nets, and hoop nets.

Most of the lands encompassed by the species habitat are protected lands, but the rivers remain vulnerable. Mobile River Basin Aquatic Ecosystem Recovery Plan has been implemented to address the needs of 22 aquatic species. One of these species is the red-bellied turtle (Pseudemys rubriventris), whose habitat overlaps with G. nigrinoda, so the plan will be beneficial to the black-knobbed map turtle.

Captive breeding has been an option for conservation efforts as well. Captive breeding is plausible for increasing population sizes in captivity. However, it remains unclear if captive-bred black-knobbed map turtles can be released into the wild and breed on their own. Black-knobbed map turtles are popular in the pet trade, but became more common because of captive breeding.
