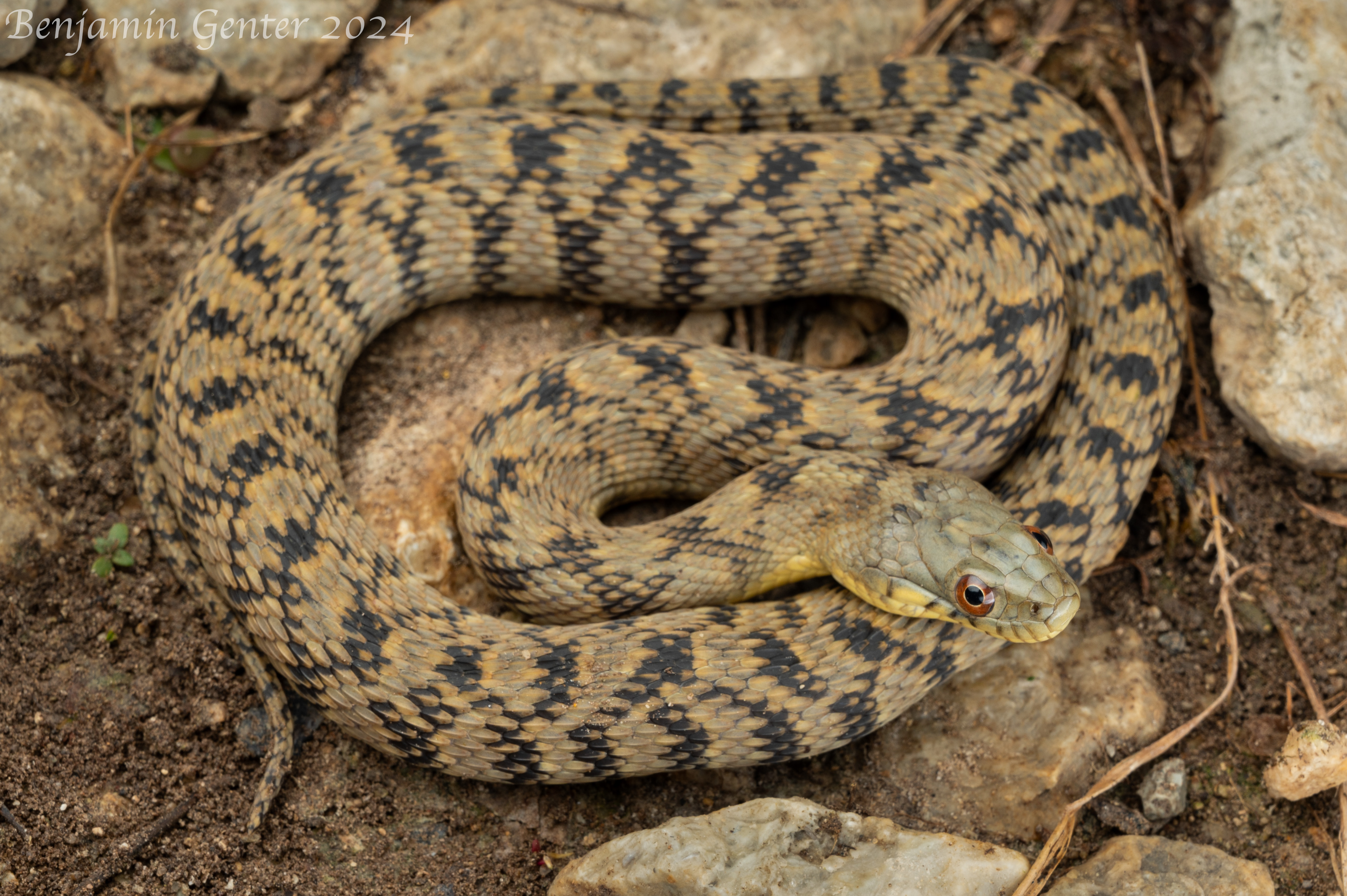

Conservation status
- Least Concern (IUCN 3.1)

Scientific classification
- Kingdom: Animalia
- Phylum: Chordata
- Class: Reptilia
- Order: Squamata
- Suborder: Serpentes
- Family: Colubridae
- Genus: Nerodia
- Species: N. rhombifer

Binomial name
- Nerodia rhombifer (Hallowell, 1852)

Subspecies
- N. r. blanchardi (Clay, 1938); N. r. rhombifera (Hallowell, 1852); N. r. werleri (Conant, 1953)
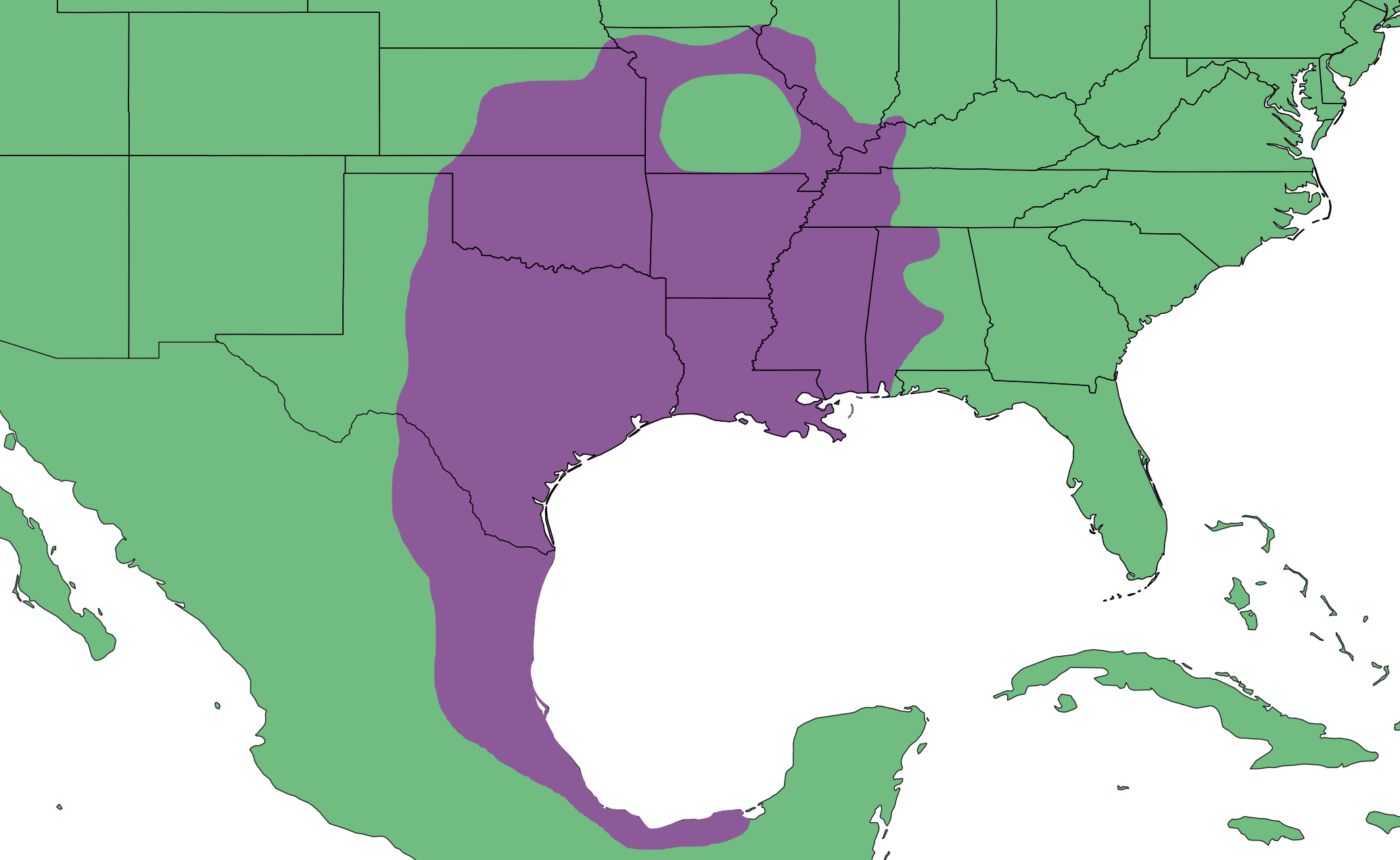

Synonyms
- Tropidonotus rhombifer Hallowell, 1852; Natrix rhombifera — Cope, 1889; Nerodia rhombifera — H.M. Smith & Brodie, 1982

= Nerodia rhombifer =

Species of snake

Nerodia rhombifer, commonly known as the diamondback water snake, is a species of nonvenomous natricine colubrid endemic to the central United States and northern Mexico. There are three recognized subspecies of N. rhombifer, including the nominotypical subspecies.

== Taxonomy and systematics ==
The species was first described as Tropidonotus rhombifer by Edward Hallowell in 1852.

== Description ==
The diamondback water snake is predominantly brown, dark brown, or dark olive green in color, with a black net-like pattern along the back, with each spot being vaguely diamond-shaped. Dark vertical bars and lighter coloring are often present down the sides of the snake. In typical counter-colored fashion, the underside is generally a yellow or lighter brown color, often with black blotching.

The dorsal scales are heavily keeled, giving the snake a rough texture. The dorsal scales are arranged in 25 or 27 rows at midbody. There are usually 3 postoculars.

Adult males have multiple papillae (tubercles) on the under surface of the chin, which are not found on any other species of snake in the United States.

Nerodia rhombifer grows to an average total length (including tail) of 76–122 cm (30–48 inches). The record total length is 180 cm (69 inches).

Neonates are often lighter in color, making their patterns more pronounced, and they darken with age.

== Habitat ==
The diamondback water snake is one of the most common species of snake within its range. It is found predominantly near slow-moving bodies of water such as streams, rivers, ponds, or swamps.

== Behavior ==
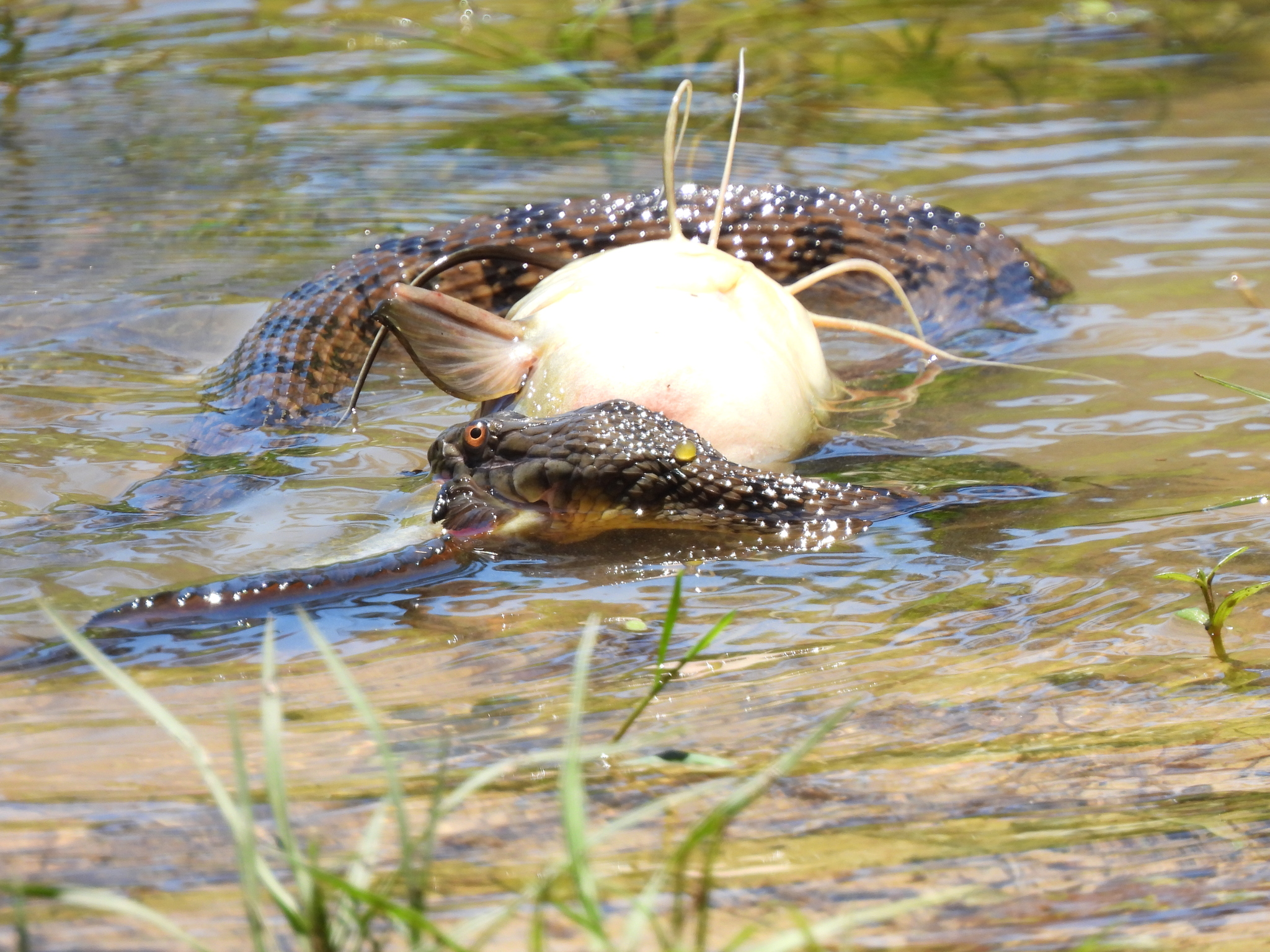
Eating a yellow bullhead catfish

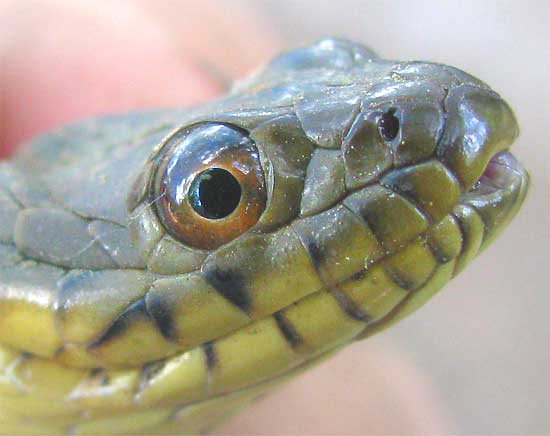
Adult

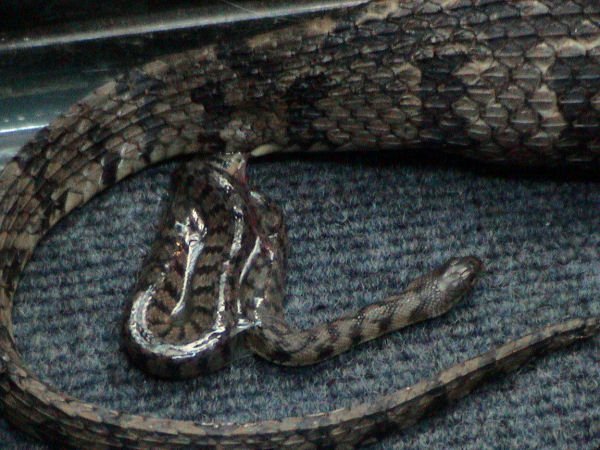
Female giving birth

When foraging for food the diamondback water snake will hang on branches suspended over the water, dipping its head under the surface of the water, until it encounters a fish or other prey. It is frequently found basking on branches over water, and when approached, it will quickly drop into the water and swim away. If cornered, it will often hiss, and flatten the head and body to appear larger. It only typically resorts to biting if physically harassed or handled. Its bite is known to be quite painful due to its sharp teeth meant to keep hold of slippery fish, as well as the slight hemotoxin in its saliva that causes increased bleeding. This snake is not considered venomous due to the very small amount of toxins in its bite, as well as the toxin not being injected through the teeth, but entering the bite wound from the snake's saliva. This defensive behavior is frequently misinterpreted as aggression and often leads to its being mistaken for the venomous cottonmouth (Agkistrodon piscivorus), with which it does share habitat in some places. The brown/tan coloration and diamond-shaped pattern also causes it to be mistaken for rattlesnakes, especially when encountered on land by individuals unfamiliar with snakes.

== Geographic range ==
The diamondback water snake is found in the central United States, predominantly along the Mississippi River valley, but its range extends beyond that. It ranges within the states of Texas, Oklahoma, Kansas, Iowa, Louisiana, Arkansas, Missouri, Illinois, Indiana, Tennessee, Mississippi, Georgia, and Alabama. It is also found in northern Mexico, in the states of Coahuila, Nuevo León, Tamaulipas, and Veracruz.

This snake has been introduced to Lafayette Reservoir in Contra Costa County, California. It was first observed in the late 1980s and had reached high densities in the early 1990s, causing fisherman and other visitors to complain as they believed that the snakes were eating the reservoir's fish, frogs and, turtles—mostly stocked fish, American bullfrogs, and red-eared sliders—all non-native species too. In 1996 a contract was awarded to a wildlife control company to cull the snake population. Just when the control effort began in late 1997, dead watersnakes and turtles were observed in large numbers. The precise cause of the die-off is unknown, but a respiratory tract fungus was found in dissected snakes. A cause for the outbreak might have been an abnormally wet and cold El Niño weather system. There have been no confirmed observations of watersnakes at Lafayette Reservoir since late 1999, but sightings are occasionally reported, and the population may still continue to present in low numbers.

== Reproduction ==
Like other Nerodia species, the diamondback water snake is ovoviviparous. Adults breed in the spring, and gravid females give birth in the late summer or early fall. Neonates are around 8–10 in (20–25 cm) in length. Though its range overlaps with several other species of water snakes, interbreeding is not known. It is one of the only species known to Reproduce asexually.

== Conservation concerns ==
While not endangered or threatened, the main threat to N. rhombifer is human ignorance. The diamondback water snake is often mistaken for the cottonmouth or rattlesnakes and is killed out of fear. In actuality, the diamondback water snake and other species of water snakes are far more common than the venomous snakes in their range, especially in areas that are frequented by humans.

== In captivity ==
Due to how common the species is, the diamondback water snake is frequently found in captivity in states where it is legal to keep native reptiles in captivity, though there is little market value for it in the pet trade. Captive specimens will often bite when captured but become fairly docile with regular handling. It may also defecate when handled, which has a particularly offensive smell, probably due to the diet of mostly fish. It eats quite well in captivity if fed primarily fish but must be supplemented with vitamin B_{1}. Larger specimens will often consume rodents.
