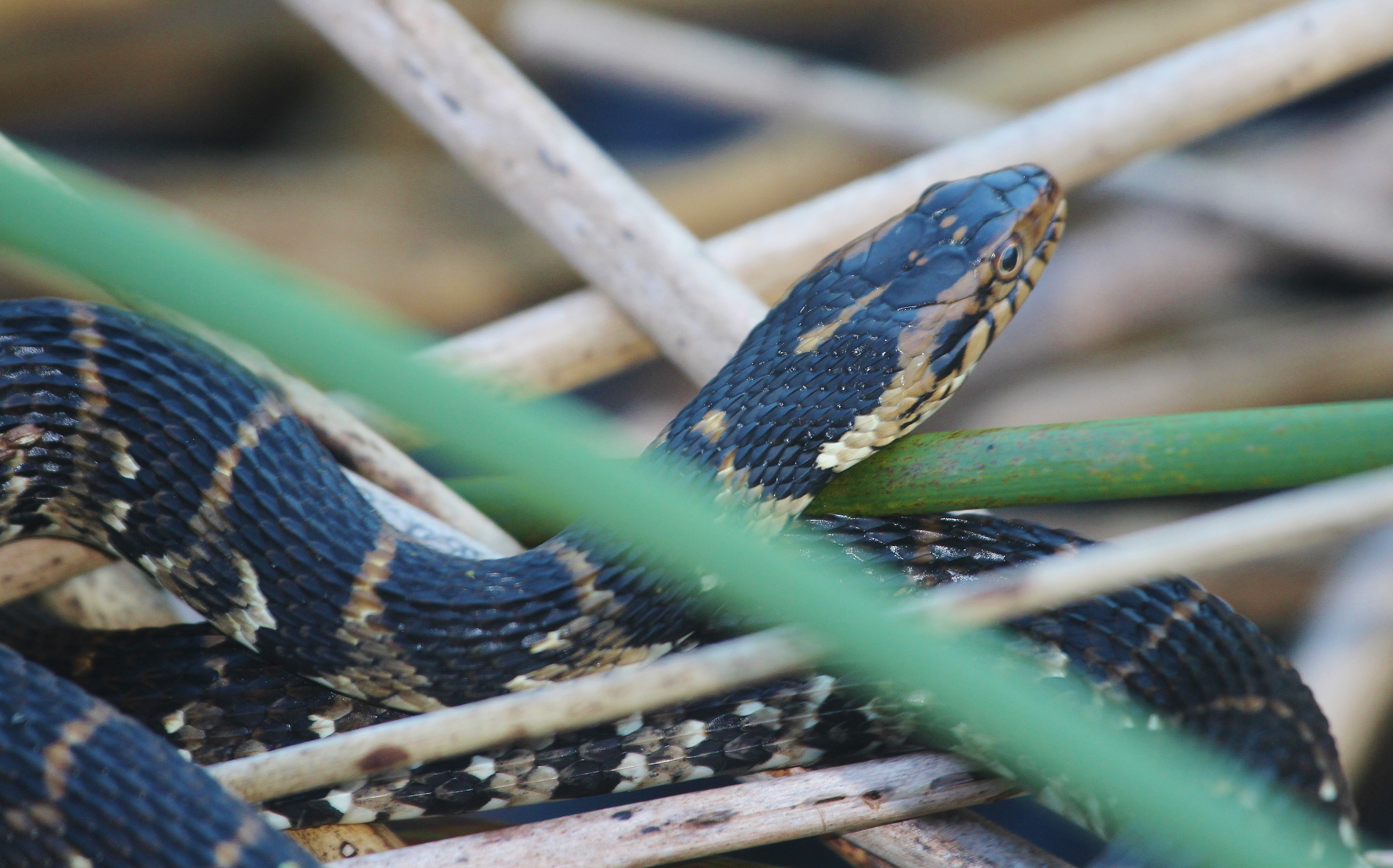

Conservation status
- Least Concern (IUCN 3.1)

Scientific classification
- Kingdom: Animalia
- Phylum: Chordata
- Class: Reptilia
- Order: Squamata
- Suborder: Serpentes
- Family: Colubridae
- Genus: Nerodia
- Species: N. fasciata

Binomial name
- Nerodia fasciata (Linnaeus, 1766)
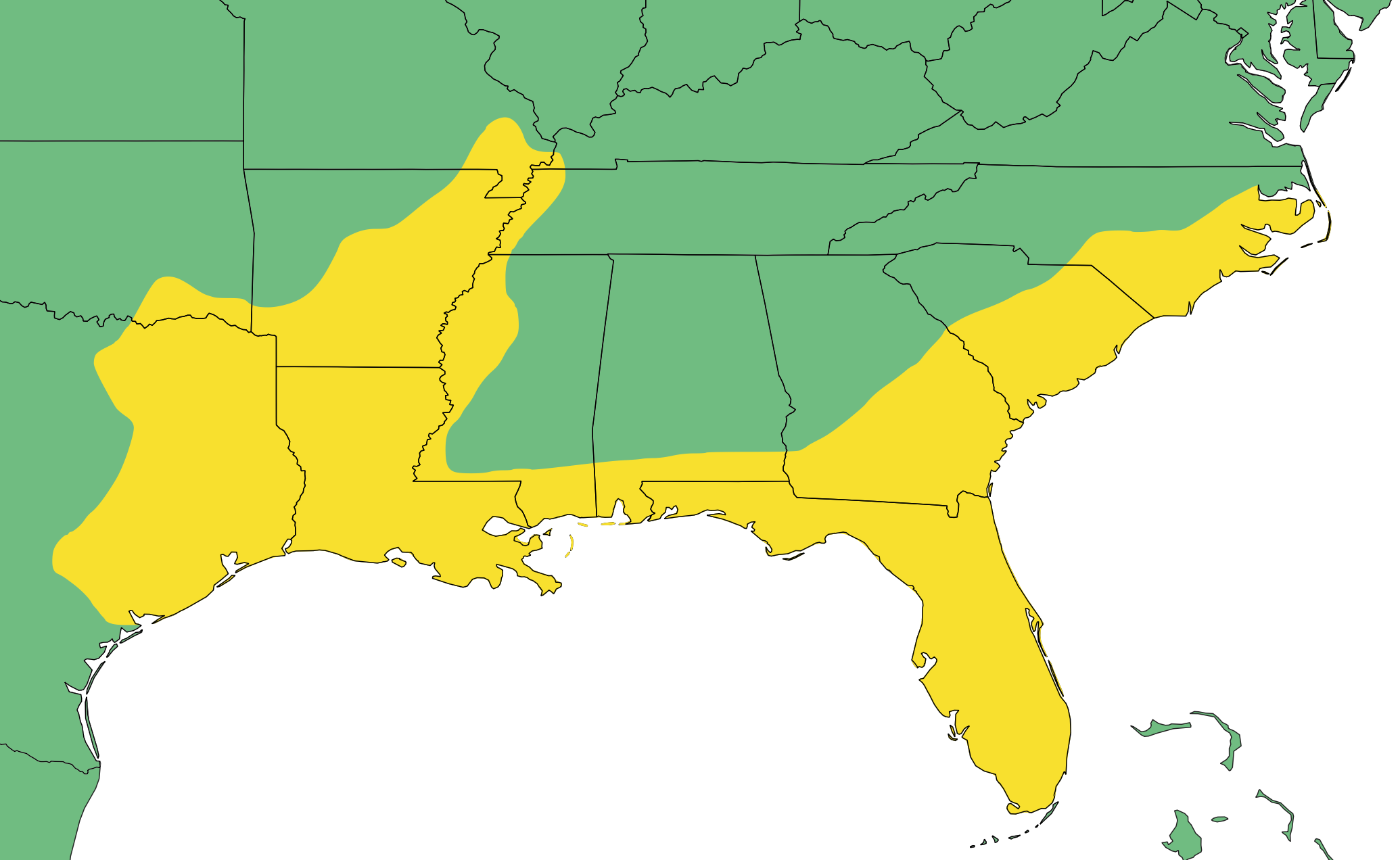

Synonyms
- Coluber fasciatus Linnaeus, 1766; Natrix fasciata subsp. confluens Blanchard, 1923; Natrix fasciata subsp. pictiventris Cope, 1895; Natrix sipedon subsp. engelsi Barbour, 1943; Natrix sipedon subsp. fasciata (Linnaeus, 1766); Nerodia sipedon subsp. fasciata (Linnaeus, 1766); Tropidonotus bisectus Cope; Natrix fasciata (Linnaeus, 1766); Natrix sipedon fasciata (Linnaeus, 1766)

= Banded water snake =

Species of snake

A Nerodia fasciata attempting to prey on a parvalbumin-coated lure. Parvalbumin is involved in prey signaling.

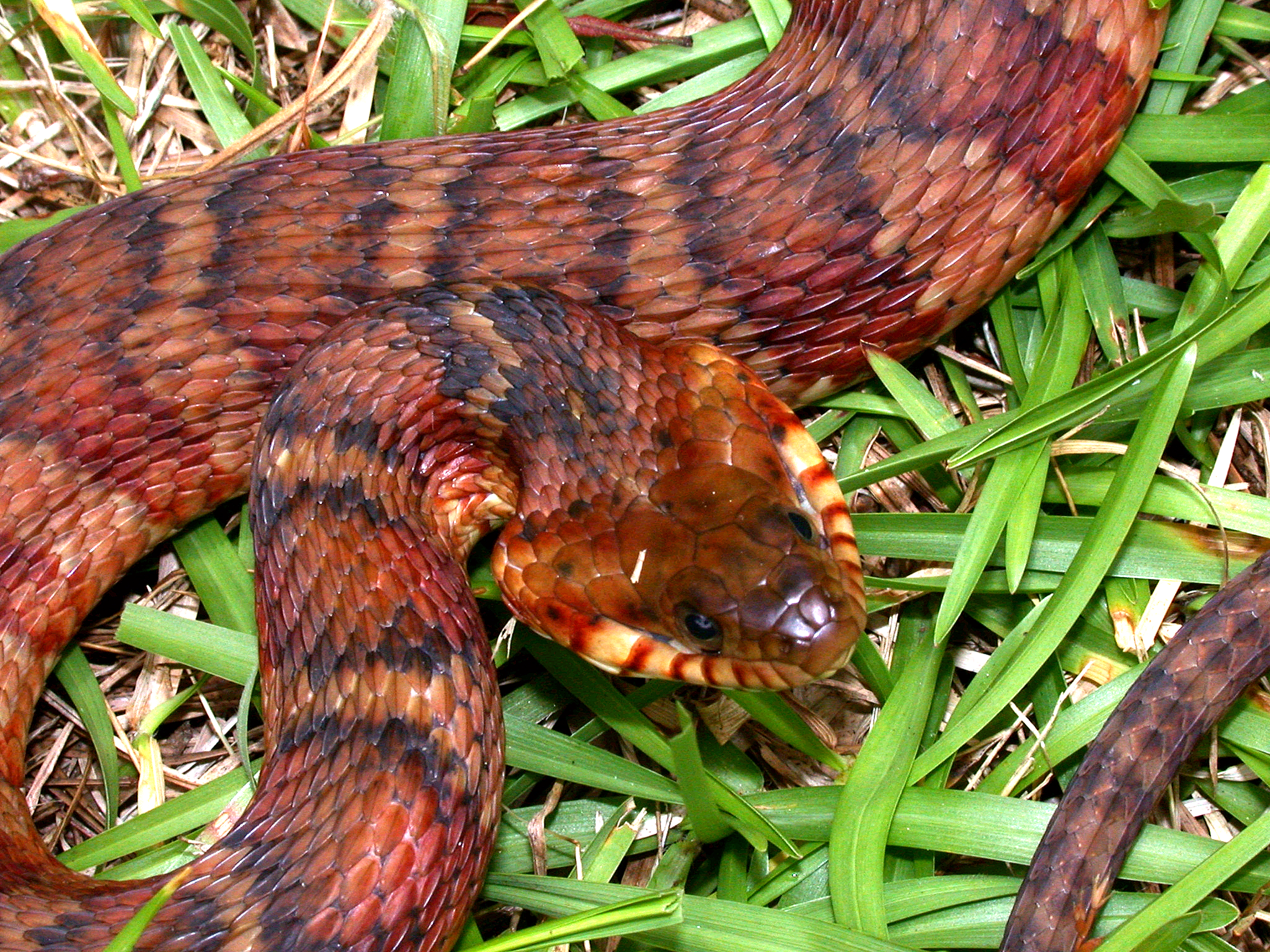
An unusual reddish specimen of banded water snake.

The banded water snake or southern water snake (Nerodia fasciata) is a species of mostly aquatic, nonvenomous, colubrid snakes most commonly found in the Midwest, Southeastern United States.

== Geographic range ==
Nerodia fasciata is natively found from southern Illinois, south to Louisiana, and east to North Carolina and Florida. Introduced populations exist in Texas and California; other sources include eastern Texas in its natural range. In 1992, its congener Nerodia sipedon (northern or common water snake) and it were found in three sites in California by the US Fish and Wildlife Service (USFWS). In 2009, more than 300 banded water snakes were caught in suburbs of Los Angeles by the Nerodia Working Group of USFWS. Then in May 2016, the species was found in the Colorado River basin near Yuma, Arizona. Further trapping did indeed catch large numbers of them, indicating that a thriving invasive population exists in that area.

== Description ==
Adults of the banded water snake typically range from 56 to 107 cm (22 to 42 in) in total length, with a record size (in the Florida subspecies) of 159 cm (62.5 in) in total length.

It is typically gray, greenish-gray, or brown in color, with dark crossbanding. Many specimens are so dark in color that their patterning is barely discernible. The ventrum (belly) is typically an off-white to white. They have flat heads, and are fairly heavy-bodied. Banded water snakes may also be identified by a dark stripe which extends from the eye to the angle of the jaw. If irritated, they release a foul-smelling musk to deter predators. This species also exhibits sexual dimorphism in which the female is generally longer and heavier than the male. The average frequency of skin shedding has been found to be every four weeks.

Their appearance leads them to be frequently mistaken for other snakes with which they share a habitat, including the venomous cottonmouth.

== Habitat ==
Nerodia fasciata inhabits most freshwater environments such as lakes, marshes, ponds, and streams. Banded water snakes are active both day and night and may be seen basking on logs or branches overhanging the water or foraging in shallow water. They will typically stay within emergent vegetation along the shoreline or in the shallow littoral zone of their habitat. They move more frequently than other Nerodia species.

== Diet ==
The species preys mainly on fish and frogs. On occasion, they prey on small turtles, small snakes, birds, earthworms, and crawfish. Juveniles mainly consume fish and shift towards eating frogs as adults. This shift may be caused by large frogs being mechanically too difficult for juveniles to consume (which may suggest juveniles may be unable to open their jaws wide enough for adult frogs), because large frogs are energetically too costly for juveniles to catch, or because juveniles are at risk if swallowing prey requires a long time. Individuals less than 500 mm snout–vent length (SVL) primarily consume relatively light mosquito fish and topminnows, whereas individuals exceeding 500 mm SVL begin taking massive bufonid (toad) and ranid (frog) prey.

Using its vomeronasal organ, also called Jacobson's organ, the snake can detect parvalbumins in the cutaneous mucus of its prey.

== Reproduction ==
The species is ovoviviparous, giving birth to live young. The brood size varies from 15 to 20 young born in late July or August. Newborns are 200–240 mm (about 8.0–9.5 in) in total length. The banded water snake is able to hybridize with the common watersnake, although this is not frequent. Physical characteristics are insufficient to distinguish such hybrids, and DNA analysis is required.

== Predator avoidance ==
When threatened, banded water snakes flatten their bodies to appear larger and emit a foul musk from their anal glands, and bite repeatedly. They will slash sideways when biting to tear the flesh of the attacker.

== Subspecies ==
The three recognized subspecies of Nerodia fasciata, including the nominotypical subspecies, are:

- Nerodia fasciata confluens (Blanchard, 1923) – Broad-banded water snake – Arkansas, Kentucky, Louisiana, Mississippi, Missouri, Oklahoma, East Texas.
- Nerodia fasciata fasciata (Linnaeus, 1766) – East Texas, Louisiana, southeastern Oklahoma, Arkansas, western Mississippi, southern Alabama, Florida, southern Georgia, South Carolina, North Carolina, southeast Missouri and Illinois.
- Nerodia fasciata pictiventris (Cope, 1895) – Florida water snake, Florida banded water snake – Florida, southeast Georgia. Introduced to Brownsville, Texas and California.

== Taxonomy ==
Some older sources have considered Nerodia fasciata to be a subspecies of Nerodia sipedon.

== Other sources ==
- Herps of Texas: Nerodia fasciata
