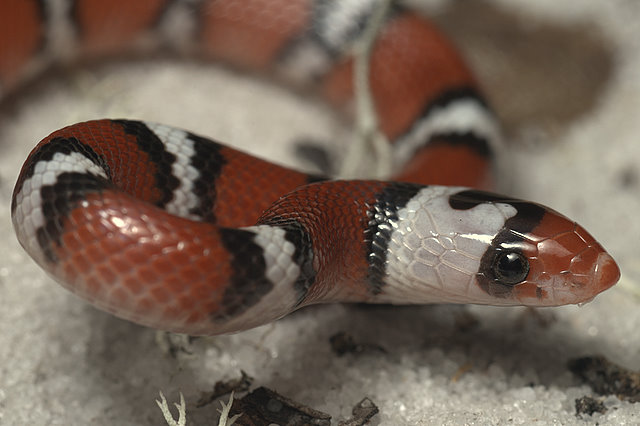
- Florida scarlet snake

Scientific classification
- Kingdom: Animalia
- Phylum: Chordata
- Class: Reptilia
- Order: Squamata
- Suborder: Serpentes
- Family: Colubridae
- Genus: Cemophora
- Species: C. coccinea
- Subspecies: C. c. coccinea

Trinomial name
- Cemophora coccinea coccinea (Blumenbach, 1788)

= Cemophora coccinea coccinea =

Subspecies of snake

Cemophora coccinea coccinea, also known commonly as the Florida scarlet snake, is the nominotypical subspecies of the scarlet snake. C. c. coccinea is a nonvenomous snake in the subfamily Colubrinae of the family Colubridae. The subspecies is endemic to the state of Florida in the southeastern United States.

== Geographic range ==
C. c. coccinea is found exclusively in peninsular Florida, from as far north as Marion County to the southern tip of the state.

== Description ==
The Florida scarlet snake usually grows to 36–51 cm (14–20 in) in total length (tail included), but the maximum recorded total length is 78 cm (31 in). It is typically gray or white, with red blotches bordered by black along its back. The black borders on the blotches often join on the lower sides of the snake forming a line down the length of the body. Its belly is a uniform white. Its scales are smooth.

Scarlet snakes can sometimes be mistaken for the scarlet kingsnake, (Lampropeltis triangulum elapsoides) or the Eastern milk snake (Lampropeltis triangulum triangulum) in the areas where their ranges overlap. The Florida scarlet snake can easily be distinguished from the scarlet kingsnake by its white (rather than yellow) bands, and from the Eastern milk snake by its red head and slightly upturned nose.

Distinguishing the Florida scarlet snake from the closely allied northern scarlet snake is more difficult, although generally the subspecies can be identified based on location; the ranges of the two subspecies overlap only minimally. The main point of distinction is the number of upper labial scales present in each subspecies: the Florida scarlet snake has 7 upper labial scales, while the northern scarlet snake has 6.

== Behavior ==
Like other scarlet snakes, the Florida scarlet snake is a secretive, burrowing species, preferring habitats of soft soils, often in open forested areas or developed agricultural land. It spends most of its time hidden, emerging to feed on small rodents and lizards, but it has a particular taste for reptile eggs, swallowing them whole or puncturing them and consuming the contents.

== Reproduction ==
The Florida scarlet snake is oviparous. Mating occurs in March through June, with 3–8 eggs laid in mid summer, and hatching in early fall. Hatchlings are 13–15 cm (5.1–5.9 in) in total length.
