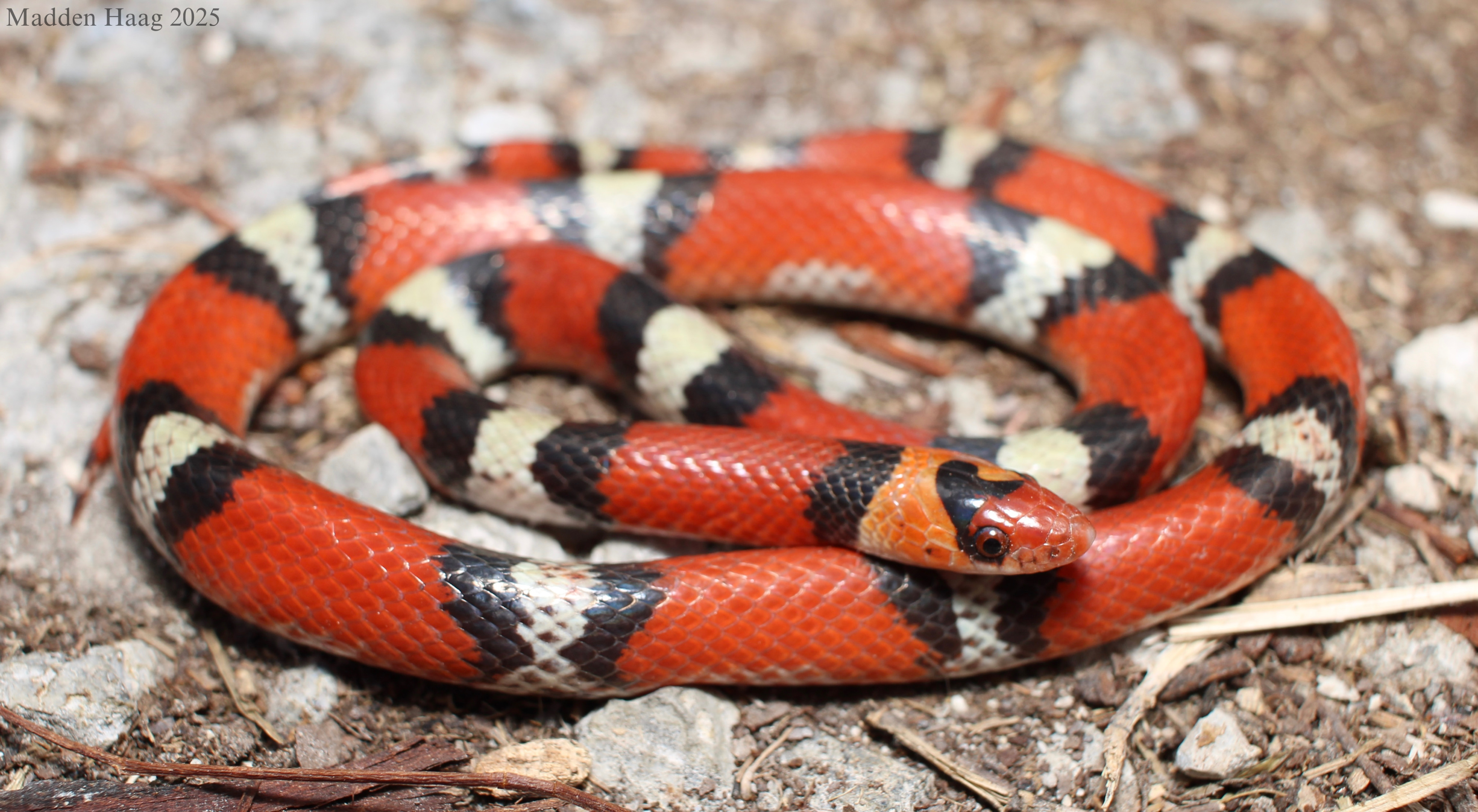
- Scarlet snake (Cemophora coccinea)

Conservation status
- Least Concern (IUCN 3.1)

Scientific classification
- Kingdom: Animalia
- Phylum: Chordata
- Class: Reptilia
- Order: Squamata
- Suborder: Serpentes
- Family: Colubridae
- Genus: Cemophora
- Species: C. coccinea

Binomial name
- Cemophora coccinea (Blumenbach, 1788)
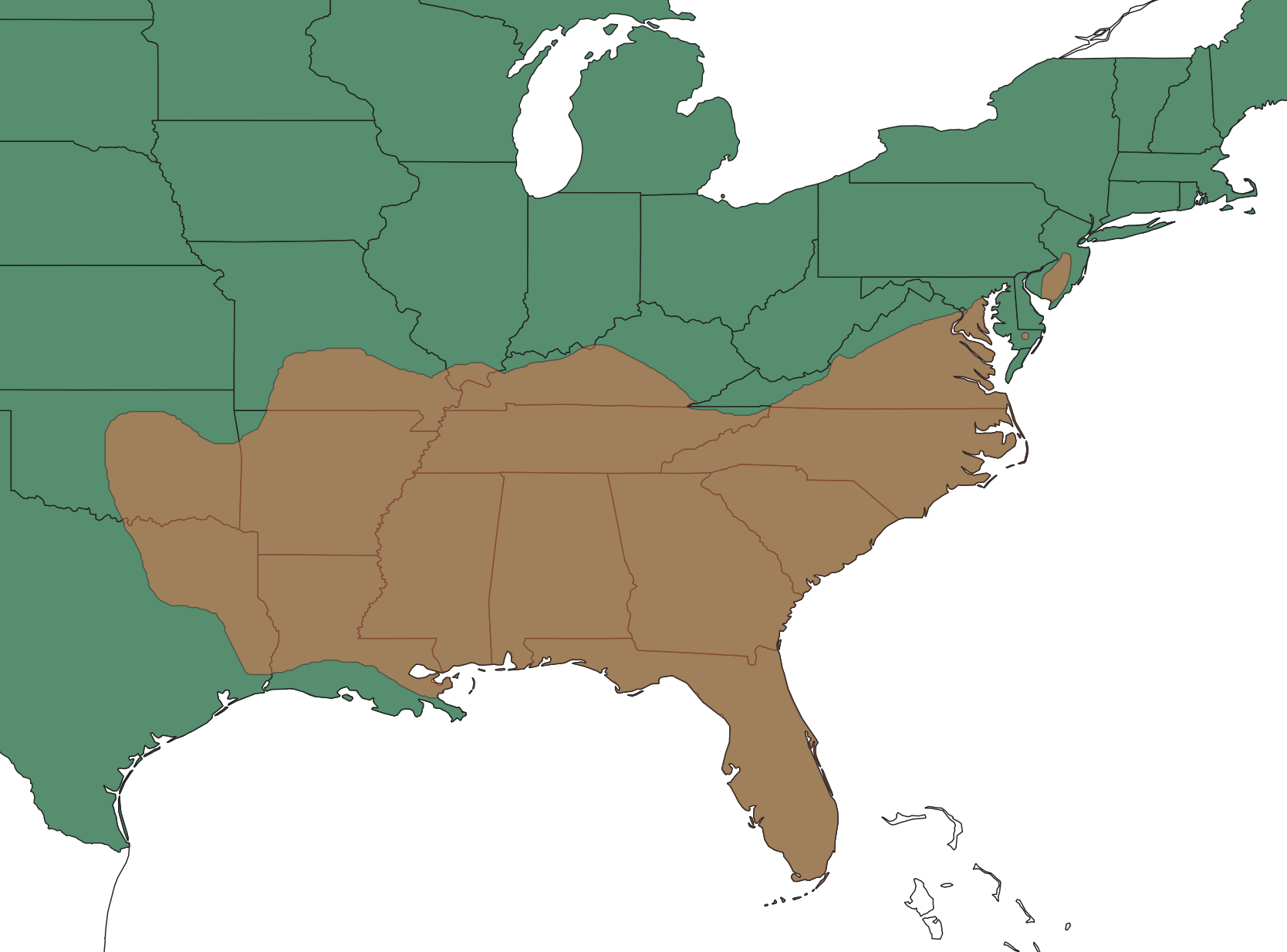

Synonyms
- Coluber coccineus Blumenbach, 1788; Elaps coccineus — Merrem, 1820; Heterodon coccineus — Schlegel, 1837; Rhinostoma coccineus — Holbrook, 1842; Simotes coccineus — A.M.C. Duméril, Bibron & A.H.A. Duméril, 1854; Cemophora coccinea — Cope, 1860; Cemophora doliata — H.M. Smith, 1952; Cemophora coccinea — A.H. Wright & A.A. Wright, 1957

= Cemophora coccinea =

Species of snake

Cemophora coccinea, commonly known as the scarlet snake, is a species of nonvenomous snake in the subfamily Colubrinae of the family Colubridae. The species is native to the southeastern United States. There are two subspecies of C. coccinea that are recognized as being valid. The Texas scarlet snake (C. lineri) was previously considered a subspecies.

== Description ==
The scarlet snake is relatively small, semi fossorial habitat specialists from southeastern United States, growing to a total length (tail included) of 14–26 inches (36–66 cm) at adult size. The dorsal pattern consists of a light gray ground color, with a series of black-bordered red, white or yellow blotches down the back. The belly is either a uniform light gray or white color. The dorsal blotches can extend down the sides of the body, appearing somewhat like banding or rings, which sometimes leads to confusion with other sympatric species such as the venomous coral snakes or the harmless scarlet king snake. The similar pattern exhibited by these three snakes is a form of mimicry known as batesian mimicry. This is a phenomenon in which members of a palatable species gain protection from predation by resembling or mimicking the defensive signaling of an unpalatable or defended species.

== Etymology ==
The generic name, Cemophora, is derived from the Greek words Kemos, meaning "muzzle", and phoros, meaning "bearing", referring to the pronounced rostral scale characteristic of members of the genus.

== Geographic distribution ==
C. coccinea is found only in the United States. It is native to peninsular Florida, and found in southeastern Texas, eastern Oklahoma, Arkansas, parts of Louisiana, Mississippi, Alabama, Georgia, South Carolina, North Carolina, Tennessee, Kentucky, Illinois, Indiana, Virginia, Maryland, and Delaware; with disjunct populations in New Jersey and central Missouri. The species is more commonly found throughout most of the Atlantic coastal plain areas. It prefers open forested areas with sandy soil, ground litter, and organic debris.

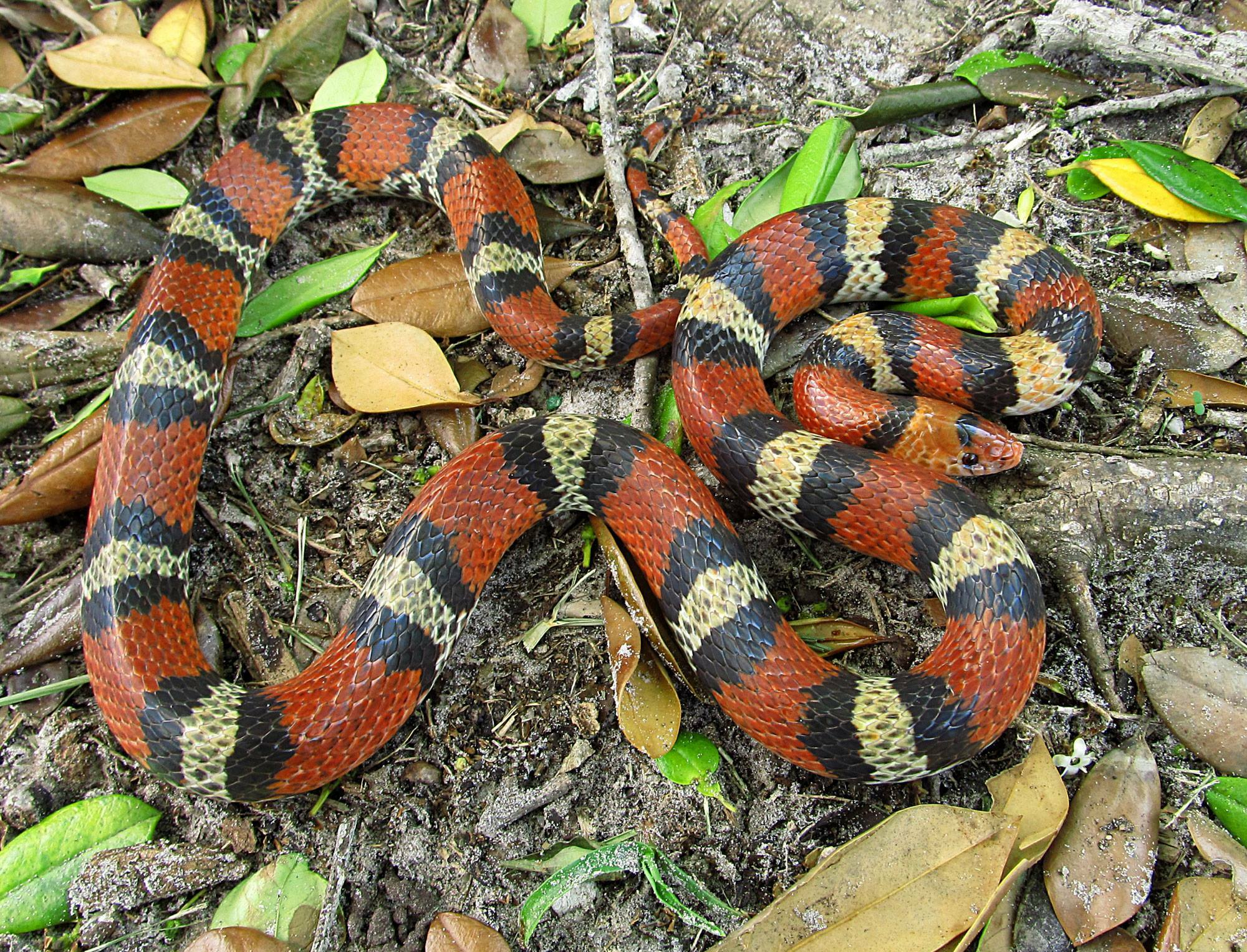
Large adult scarlet snake

In Indiana, the scarlet snake is listed as an endangered species. In New Jersey, the scarlet snake has been recommended by the New Jersey Endangered and Nongame Advisory Committee to be given threatened status for the species within the state, but no formal rule proposal has been filed to date. The threatened status is largely due to population declines and habitat loss. Reasons for the decline in the population are loss of habitat, illegal capture for the pet trade, road mortality, and direct intentional killing.

== Behavior and diet ==
The scarlet snake is nocturnal and is active only during the summer months. It can be found during the day beneath logs and under pine debris or other organic litter. It also burrows underground during daytime hours, or uses previously dug tunnels as shelter. At night it is often seen crossing roads, or prowling the forest floor searching for prey. The diet of C. coccinea consists of lizards, small rodents, and eggs of lizards, turtles, and other snakes. Its large, very sharp posterior teeth are used to slash open large reptile eggs. The snake will either squeeze an egg to expel its contents or thrust its head into the egg to break it open. The smallest reptile eggs are eaten in their entirety.

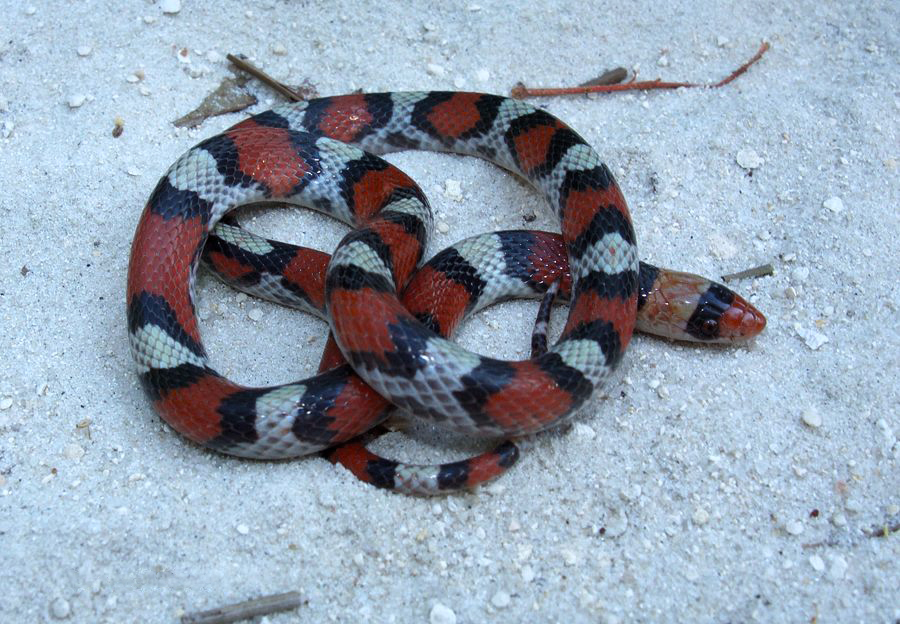
Cemophora coccinea copei, Northern scarlet snake

== Reproduction ==
There is very little known about the reproductive habits of the scarlet snake. It is oviparous, generally laying 2–9 eggs per clutch, with the typical clutch yielding five eggs. Breeding occurs throughout the spring months, and eggs are laid throughout the summer in burrows or under rocks. The eggs hatch two months after being laid, typically in the late summer or autumn.

In Florida, one female scarlet snake laid 13 fertile eggs, which exceeded the largest previously reported clutch of 9 eggs.

== Predators and defense ==
The natural predators of the scarlet snake are snake-eating snakes such as coral snakes, and predatory birds and mammals. The scarlet snake rarely bites when picked up by humans, but it can release a foul-smelling odor. The scarlet snake will use its version of batesian mimicry and mimic the venomous coral snakes as a defense mechanism in order to reduce predation.

== Conservation ==
The two greatest threats that scarlet snakes face are habitat destruction from commercial development and vehicle strikes on roads. Other threats are illegal capture of the species for the pet trade and intentional killing.

== Subspecies ==
The following two subspecies are recognized as being valid.

- Cemophora coccinea coccinea (Blumenbach, 1788) – Florida scarlet snake
- Cemophora coccinea copei Jan, 1863 – northern scarlet snake

Nota bene: A trinomial authority in parentheses indicates that the subspecies was originally described in a genus other than Cemophora.
