= Mary Hewes Hinckley =

American herpetologist (1845–1944)

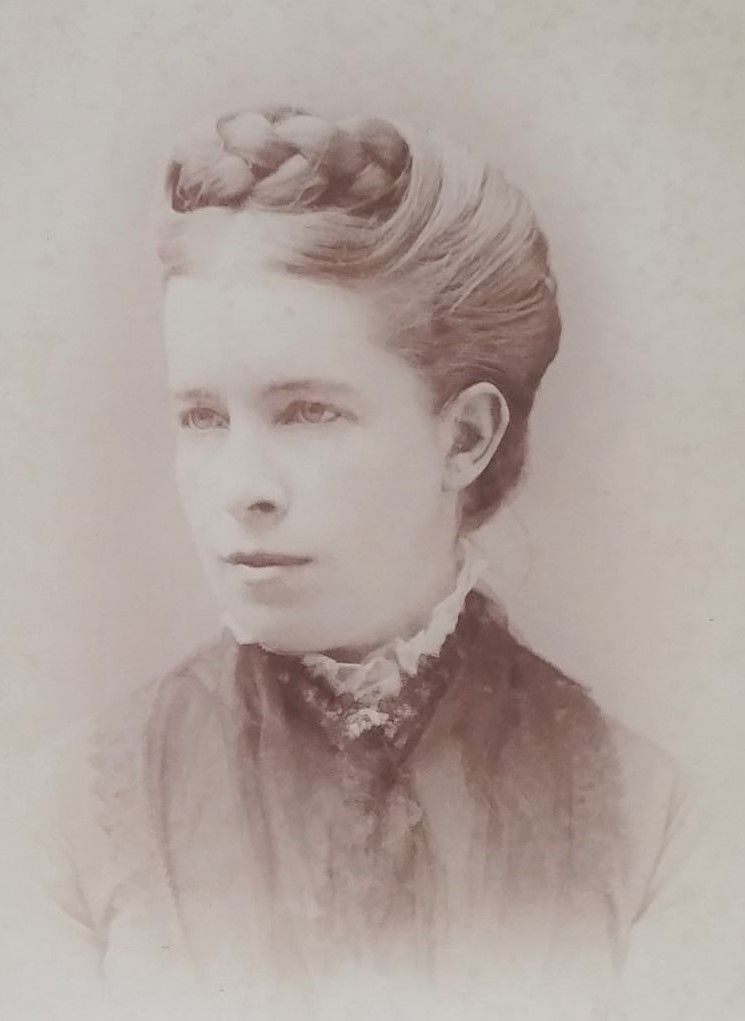
- Born: April 6, 1845; Milton, Massachusetts
- Died: June 5, 1944 (aged 99)
- Resting place: Milton Cemetery
- Occupation: Herpetologist
- Known for: Being the first to describe Anaxyrus fowleri (Fowler's Toad)

Mary Hewes Hinckley (6 April 1845—5 June 1944) was an American herpetologist, who made important contributions to the study of frogs in North America.

== Life ==
Mary Hewes Hinckley was born in Milton, Massachusetts on 6 April 1845, the first child of celebrated painter Thomas Hewes Hinckley (1814–18961) and Sally Ann Bent (1814–1857). She was a descendent of Thomas Hinckley, Governor of the Plymouth Colony. Her mother died when Hinckley was 12 years old. She attended Milton Academy, but little else is known of her early life and education. She did not attend Radcliffe College, as might have been expected of a woman of her background.

Hinckley lived most of her life in Milton. In 1908, she published Sketches of Early Milton about her hometown. Mary Hewes Hinckley died on 5 June 1944, aged 99. She was cremated and her ashes scattered at the grave of her stepmother, Elizabeth Bass Estey (1824–1909), in the family's plot at Milton Cemetery.

== Herpetology ==
Between 1880 and 1884, Hinckley five important papers on northeastern frogs. These have been described by C. Kenneth Dodd Jr. as "highly original with a large amount of detail", even in comparison to other field observations of the period. In these papers, she anticipated the more intensive research into environment and development in frogs of the mid to late 20th-century. Hinckley also produced detailed and highly accurate illustrations.

Hinckley is attributed as the author of the description of Fowler's Toad, (Anaxyrus fowleri), as a distinct species.

Hinckley was one of four American women to whom Anna Allen Wright and Albert Hazen Wright dedicated their 1933 Handbook of Frogs and Toads. They named her as one of those who "in addition to serving the public and science generously, have in the last half-century contributed most notably to the study" of herpetology.

== Legacy ==
In a foreword to a 1995 edition of the Handbook of Frogs and Toads, Roy McDiarmid wrote:

Having recently read several papers by Mary Hinckley written in the 1880s on the morphology and development of North American tadpoles, I concluded that had more tadpole workers followed her example and presented stylized illustrations of tadpole mouthparts, we would be further along in our quest to comprehend the variation and distribution of larval traits, and their value in discerning frog phylogeny.

In a 2024 biographical article on Hinckley, C. Kenneth Dodd Jr. argued that while much remains unknown about her life and work:

Mary Hewes Hinckley clearly possessed a keen intellect and was insightful beyond her contemporaries, as well as an illustrator of great aptitude. She should be acknowledged as an important early contributor to North American herpetology, specifically in regard to the study of the life history and ecology of frogs.
