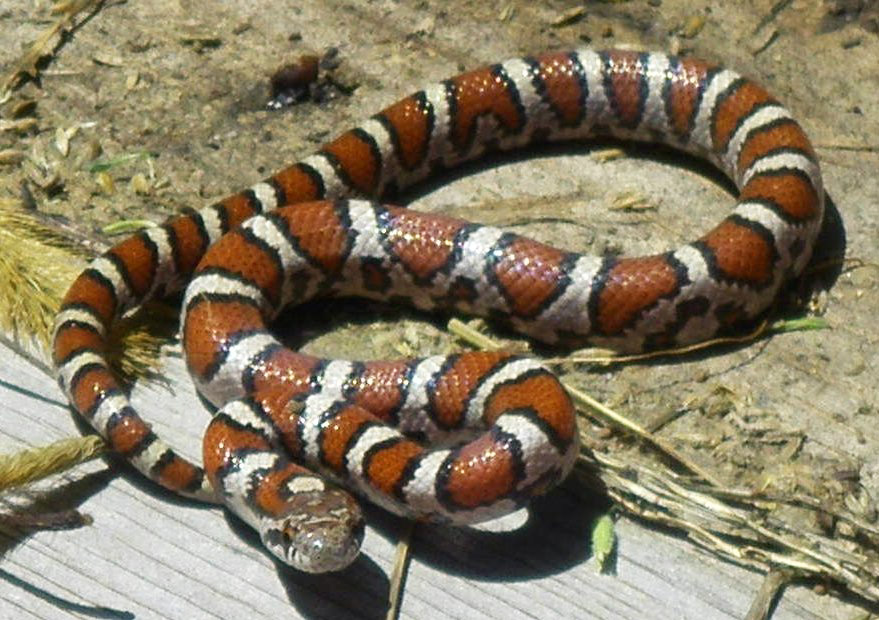
- In Tennessee

Scientific classification
- Kingdom: Animalia
- Phylum: Chordata
- Class: Reptilia
- Order: Squamata
- Suborder: Serpentes
- Family: Colubridae
- Genus: Lampropeltis
- Species: L. triangulum
- Subspecies: L. t. triangulum

Trinomial name
- Lampropeltis triangulum triangulum (Lacépède, 1789)

Synonyms
- Coluber triangulum Lacépède, 1789; Lampropeltis triangula — Cope, 1860; Ophibolus triangulus — Garman, 1884; Coronella triangulum — Boettger, 1898; Lampropeltis doliata triangulum — A.H. Wright & A.A. Wright, 1957; Lampropeltis triangulum triangulum — Conant & Collins, 1991; Lampropeltis triangulum — Wallach et al., 2014

= Eastern milk snake =

Subspecies of snake

Lampropeltis triangulum triangulum, commonly known as the eastern milk snake or eastern milksnake, is a subspecies of the milk snake (Lampropeltis triangulum). The nonvenomous, colubrid snake is indigenous to eastern and central North America.

== Geographic range ==
The eastern milk snake ranges from Maine to Ontario in the north to Alabama and North Carolina in the south. It was once thought by herpetologists to intergrade with the scarlet kingsnake (Lampropeltis elapsoides) in a portion of its southern range, but this has been disproved.

== Common names ==
Additional common names for L. t. triangulum include the following: adder, blatschich schlange, chain snake, checkered adder, checkered snake, chequered adder, chequered snake, chicken snake, common milk snake, cow-sucker, highland adder, horn snake, house snake, king snake, leopard-spotted snake, milk sucker, pilot, red snake, sachem snake, sand-king, scarlet milk snake, spotted adder, and thunder-and-lightning snake.

== Description ==
The eastern milk snake averages 60 to 91 centimetres (24 to 36 in) in total length (including tail), although specimens as long as 132 centimetres (52 in) in total length have been measured. It has smooth and shiny scales. The dorsal color pattern consists of brownish dorsal saddles, which are edged with black. The dorsal saddles are sometimes reddish or reddish brown in southern areas of its range. The pattern on the top and sides of the snake has also been described as three (or possibly five) series of black-bordered brown (reddish brown sometimes) blotches along the length of the snake on a gray or tan ground. The blotches in the dorsal series are large, while the blotches in the two (or possibly four) lateral series are smaller. The belly pattern is black and white checks (often irregular). The eastern milk snake is often described as exhibiting Batesian mimicry, being a palatable organism mimicking the unpalatable coral snake Micrurus fulvius

In 2023, the eastern milk snake became the official snake of Illinois.

== Habitat ==
The eastern milk snake is a species commonly found in rural areas where hibernation and feeding sites, such as buildings and mammal burrows, are abundant, and it also uses a variety of open habitats and forest edges. Milksnakes in fragmented habitat select locations with a greater number of cover objects within open patches surrounded by high density vegetation.

== Reproduction ==
The eastern milk snake is oviparous with an average clutch size of 4–12 eggs. Eggs are typically laid in rotting wood or beneath rocks and logs. Occasionally, some eggs may be buried several inches deep in the soil. Most of the eggs will adhere to one another. Eggs are usually laid in the early summer and hatch after 2–2½ months. The eastern milk snake takes 3–4 years to reach full maturity. Little is known about their mating patterns. However, it is assumed that they probably mate while still in their hibernacula in the spring before emerging and dispersing to their summer ranges. Mating is inferred to be indiscriminate.

== Feeding behavior ==
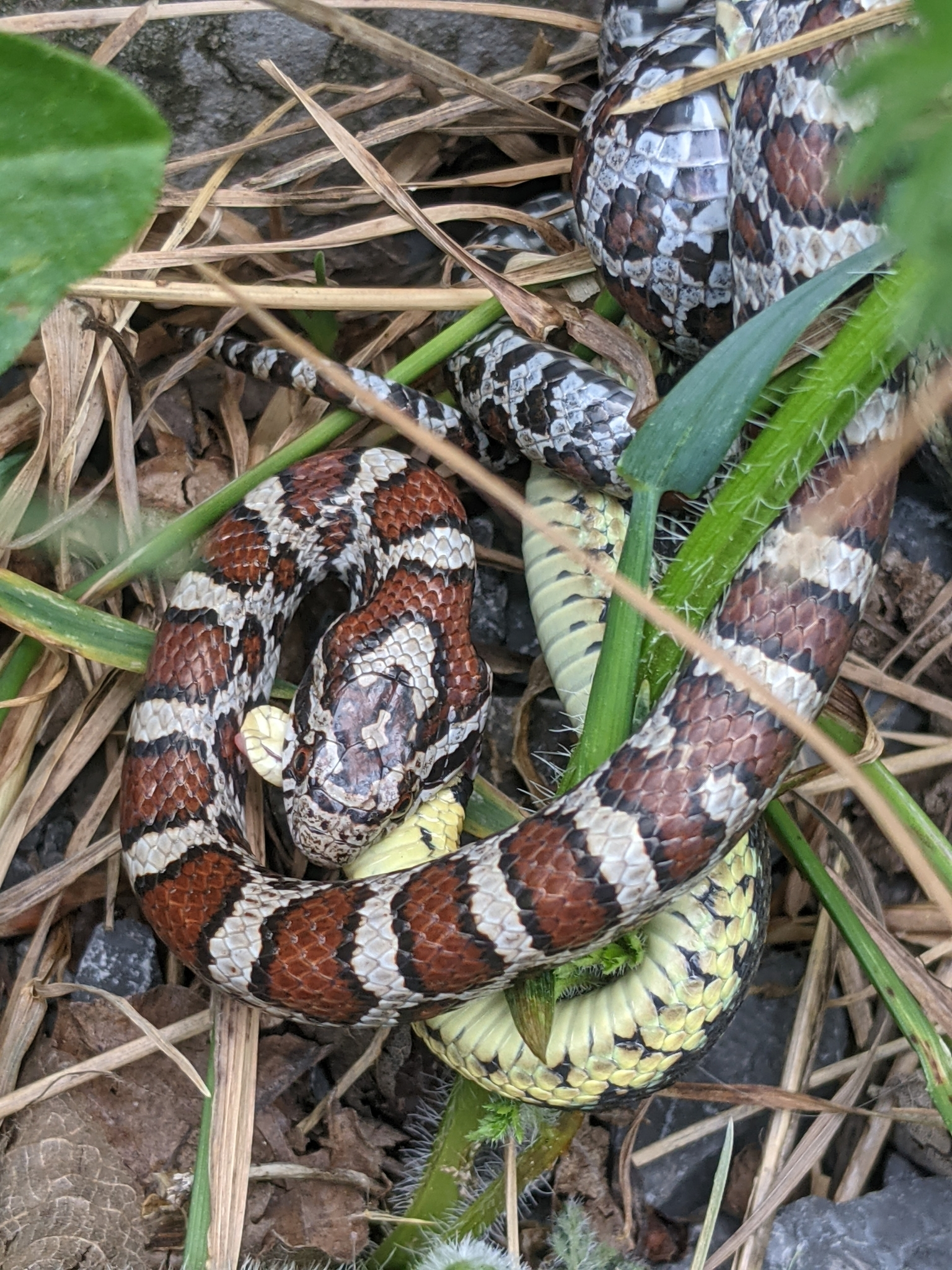
Eating an eastern garter snake, in Ontario

The eastern milk snake is a nocturnal hunter. It feeds primarily on mice but consumes other small mammals, snakes, birds, bird eggs, slugs, and other invertebrates. Juveniles commonly eat other small snakes, amphibians, and insects. As they age, they tend to feed on more birds and rodents. The Eastern milk snake is able to eat venomous snakes due to the venom neutralizing properties found in its blood.

In a study on eastern milk snakes in Kansas, specific prey items were identified. Twenty natural food items were recorded as follows: 12 Eumeces fasciatus, 2 Diadophis punctatus, 4 Cryptotis parva, 1 Eumeces obsoletus (juvenile, tail only), 1 Carphophis vermis, and 1 Peromyscus maniculatus.

== Predator and prey ==
Eastern milk snake jaws are small and delicate, not adapted for ingestion of bulk prey. The eastern milk snake is a constrictor. After striking and seizing prey, it quickly wraps its body around the prey animal to suffocate it, then swallows its prey whole. Common predators of the eastern milk snake include opossums, skunks, raccoons, hawks, owls, and coyotes. Its coloration mimics the colors of the venomous coral snake and venomous copperhead, which deters its predators. It has also been known to shake its tail, mimicking rattlesnakes when threatened.

== As a pet ==
Like many species of milk snakes, the eastern milk snake is often bred in captivity for the pet trade. It is generally docile and rarely attempts to bite.

== Gallery ==
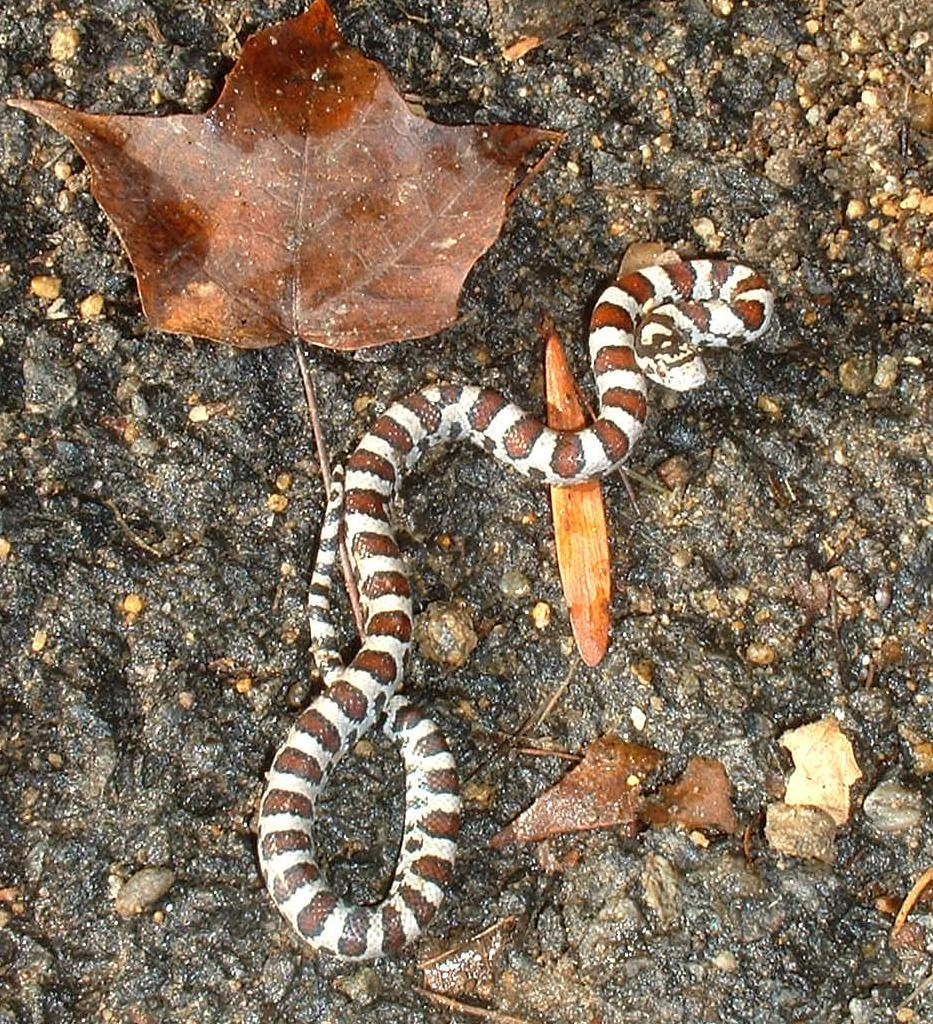
Juvenile eastern milk snake in Massachusetts

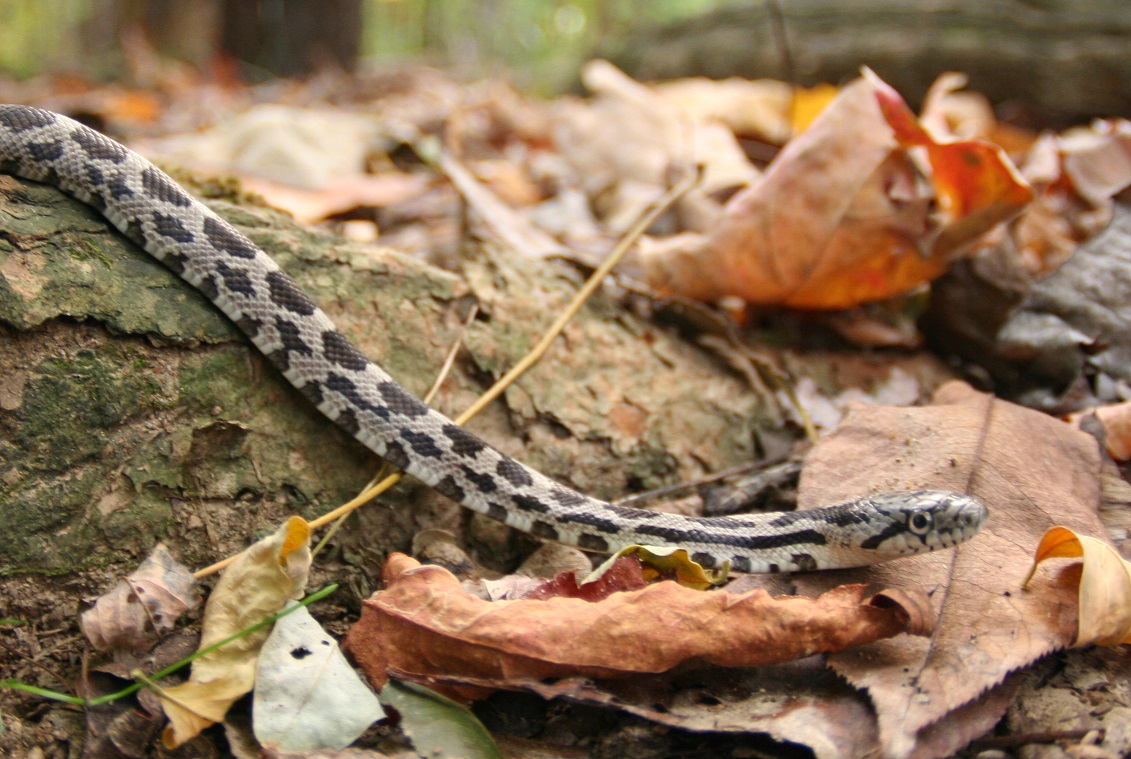
Eastern milk snake in Ohio

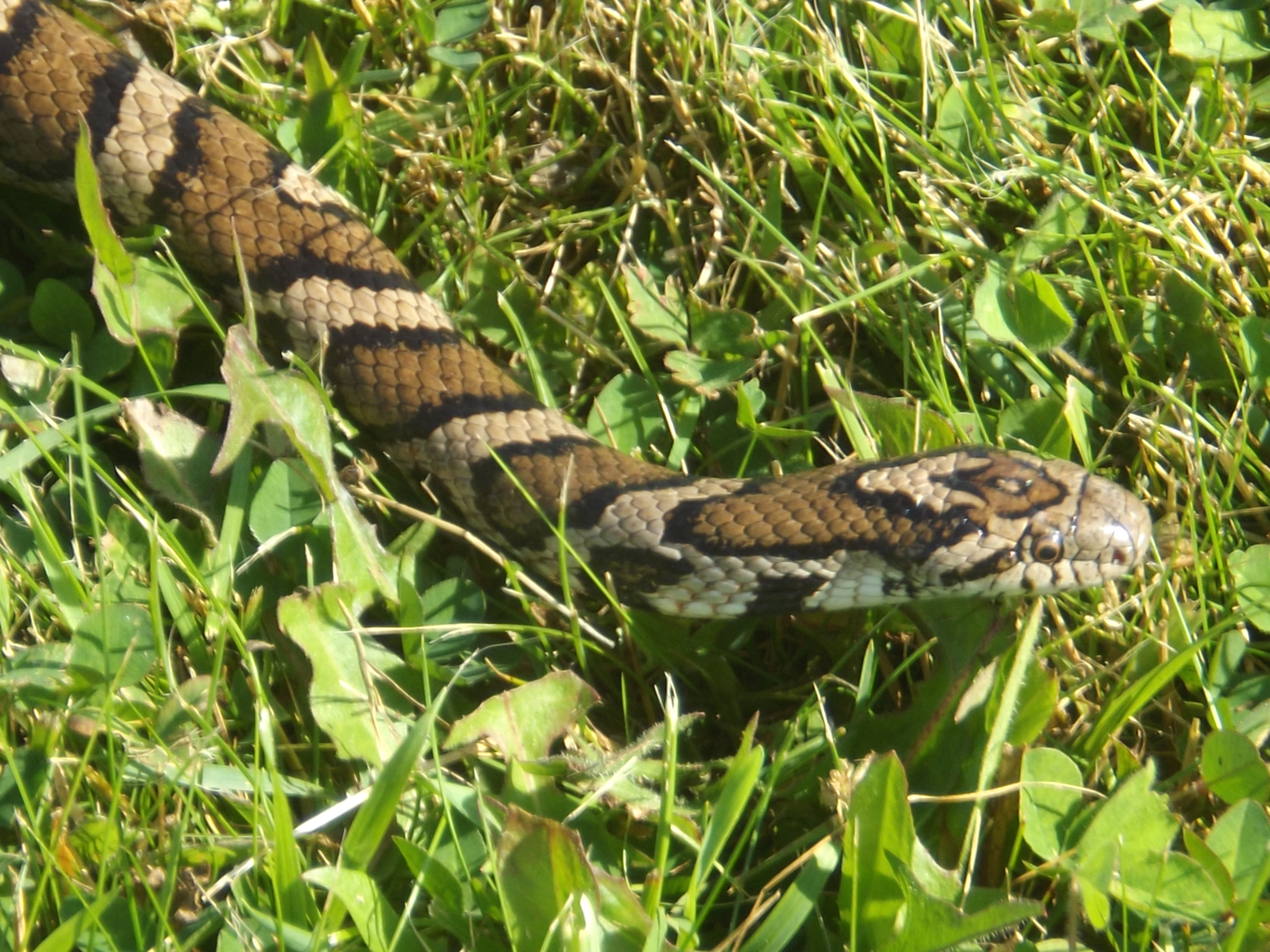
Eastern milk snake

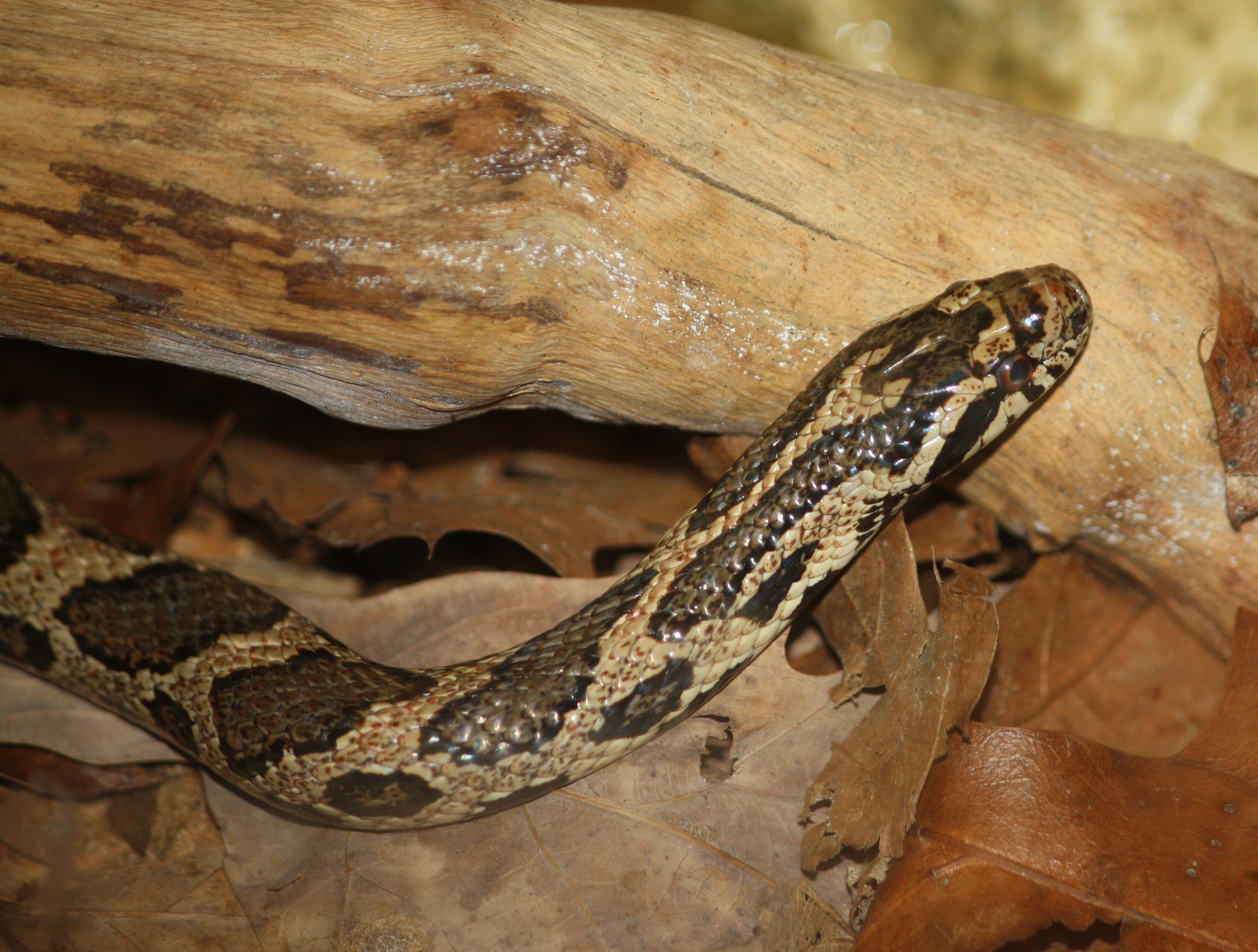
Eastern milk snake at the Binder Park Zoo in Battle Creek, Michigan

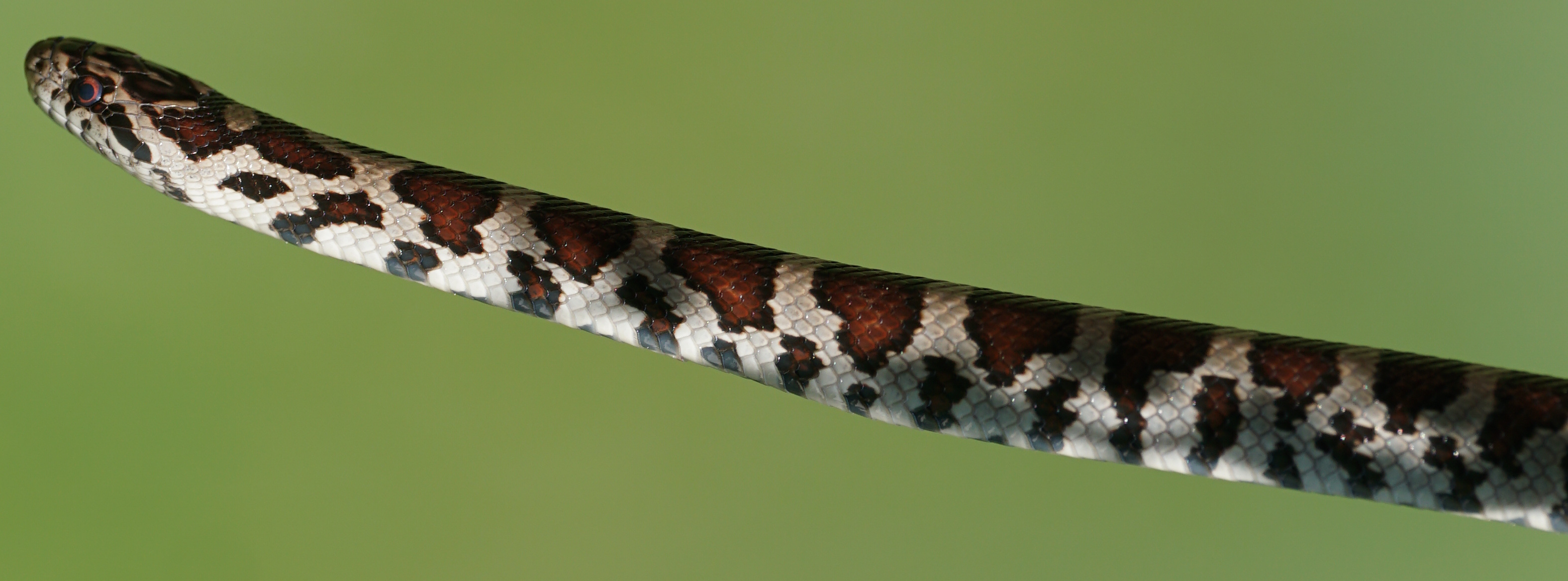
Eastern Milk Snake found near Decatur, New York on May 29, 2022
