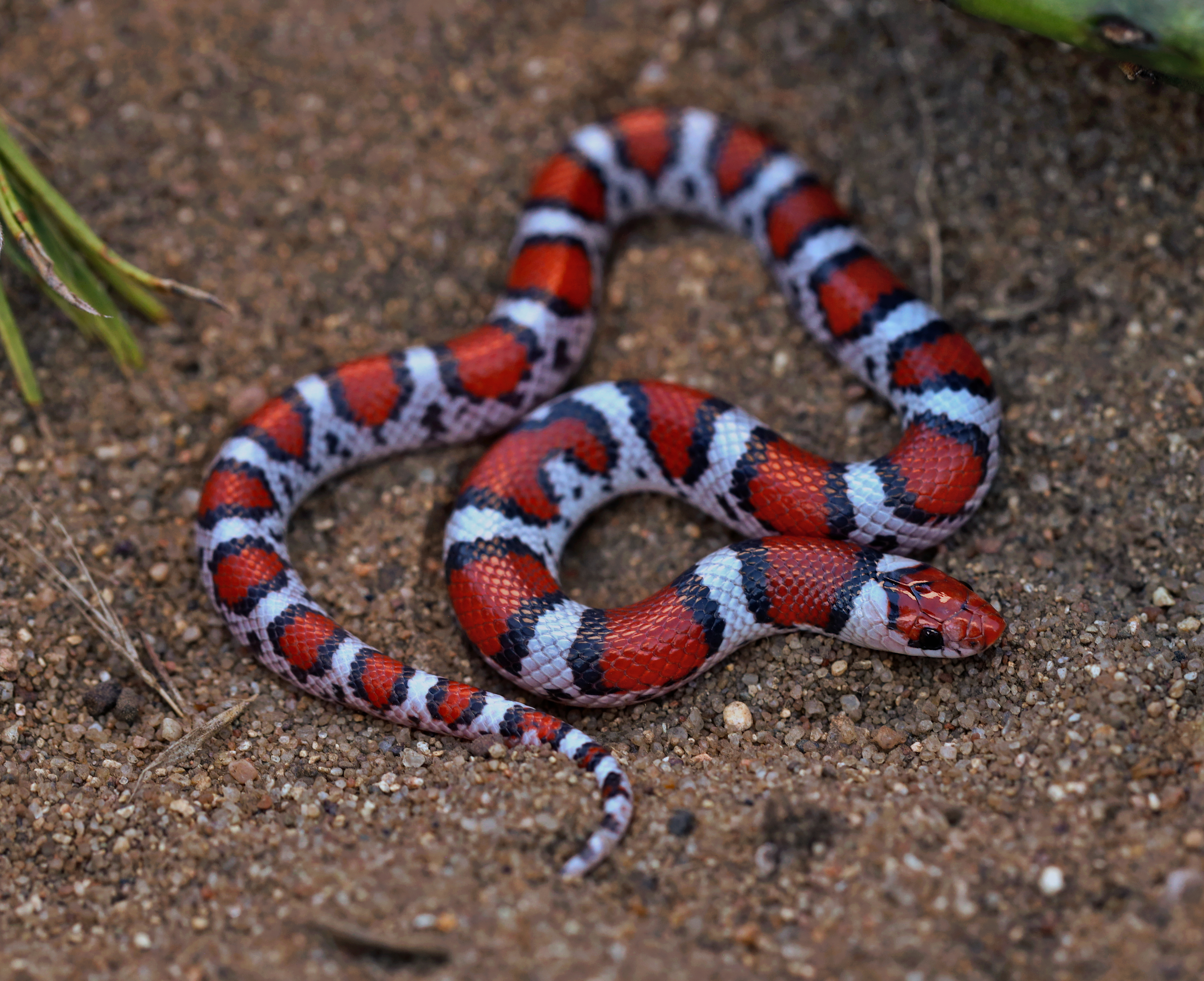

Scientific classification
- Kingdom: Animalia
- Phylum: Chordata
- Class: Reptilia
- Order: Squamata
- Suborder: Serpentes
- Family: Colubridae
- Genus: Cemophora
- Species: C. coccinea
- Subspecies: C. c. copei

Trinomial name
- Cemophora coccinea copei Jan, 1863

Synonyms
- Cemophora copei Jan, 1863

= Cemophora coccinea copei =

Subspecies of snake

Cemophora coccinea copei, also known commonly as the northern scarlet snake, is a subspecies of scarlet snake in the subfamily Colubrinae of the family Colubridae. The subspecies is native to the southern and eastern United States.

== Etymology ==
The specific name or epithet, copei, is in honor of renowned American taxonomist Edward Drinker Cope.

== Description ==
The northern scarlet snake grows to 36–51 cm (14–20 inches) in total length (tail included). It is typically a gray or white base color, with 17–24 red blotches bordered by black running down the back. The black borders on the blotches often join on the lower sides of the snake forming a line down the length of the body. The dorsal scales are smooth. The northern scarlet snake can sometimes be mistaken for the scarlet kingsnake (Lampropeltis triangulum elapsoides) or the eastern milk snake (Lampropeltis triangulum triangulum) in the areas where the geographic ranges of the species overlap.

== Behavior ==
The northern scarlet snake is a secretive, burrowing species, preferring habitats of soft soils, often in open forested areas or developed agricultural land. They spend most of their time hidden, emerging to feed on small rodents and lizards, but they have a particular taste for reptile eggs, swallowing them whole or puncturing them and consuming the contents.

== Reproduction ==
Mating of the northern scarlet snake occurs in March through June, with 3-8 eggs laid in mid summer, and hatching in early fall. Each hatchling is 13–15 cm (5-6 inches) in total length (including tail).

== Geographic distribution ==
The northern scarlet snake is found in the United States, in: eastern Texas, eastern Oklahoma, Arkansas, Louisiana, Mississippi, Alabama, Georgia, South Carolina, North Carolina, Tennessee, Kentucky, Illinois, southern Indiana, Virginia, Maryland, Delaware, and barely into northern Florida, with disjunct populations New Jersey, and central Missouri.

== Conservation status ==
The northern scarlet snake holds no particular conservation status throughout most of its range, but it is listed as endangered species in the states of Indiana and Florida. It is only found in a single county in each state as these are the northern and southern extents of its range.
