= Thunder-and-lightning snake =

Thunder-and-lightning snake may refer to:

- Micrurus fulvius, also known as the eastern coral snake, a venomous elapid found in the eastern United States.
- Lampropeltis g. getula, also known as the eastern kingsnake, a harmless colubrid species found in the eastern United States.
