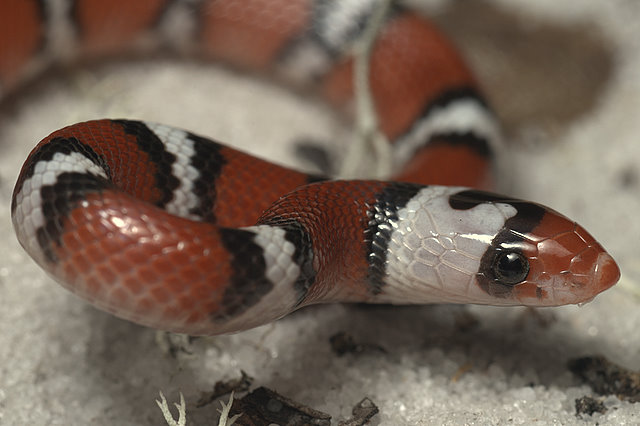
- Cemophora coccinea

Scientific classification
- Kingdom: Animalia
- Phylum: Chordata
- Class: Reptilia
- Order: Squamata
- Suborder: Serpentes
- Family: Colubridae
- Tribe: Lampropeltini
- Genus: Cemophora; Cope, 1860

Species
- Two recognized species, see article.

= Cemophora =

Genus of snakes

Cemophora is a genus of harmless snakes, also known commonly as scarlet snakes, in the subfamily Colubrinae of the family Colubridae. The genus contains two species, which are endemic to the United States.

== Species ==
- Cemophora coccinea (Blumenbach, 1788)
  - Cemophora coccinea coccinea (Blumenbach, 1788) – Florida scarlet snake
  - Cemophora coccinea copei Jan, 1863 – northern scarlet snake
- Cemophora lineri (K.L. Williams, B.C. Brown, & L.D. Wilson, 1966) – Texas scarlet snake
