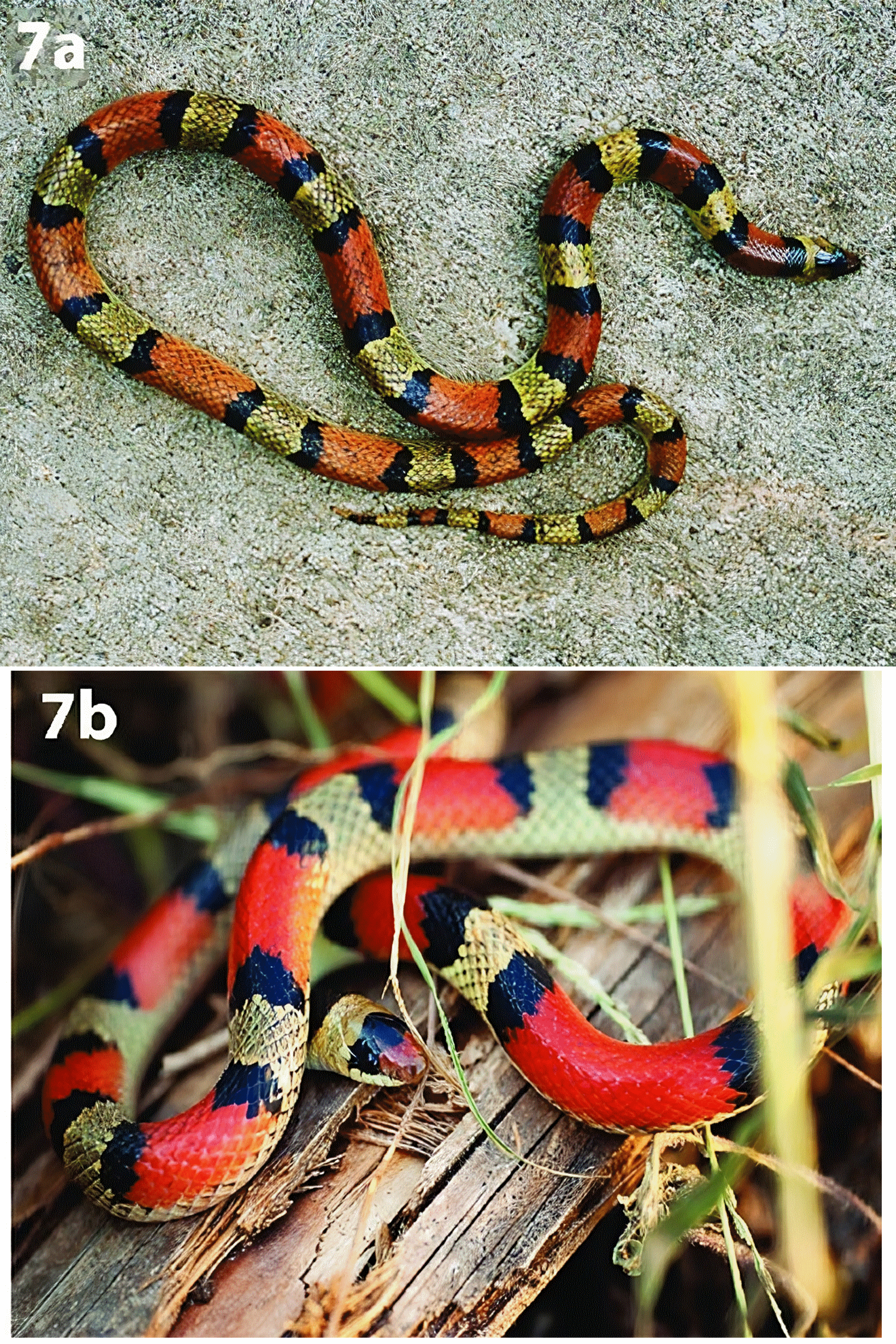
- Comparison of Cemophora lineri (Texas scarlet snake) specimen from North Padre Island (7a) with C. lineri specimen from San Patricio County (7b), note that the colors of the NPI specimen are duller than those of the scarlet snake from the mainland.

Scientific classification
- Kingdom: Animalia
- Phylum: Chordata
- Class: Reptilia
- Order: Squamata
- Suborder: Serpentes
- Family: Colubridae
- Genus: Cemophora
- Species: C. lineri

Binomial name
- Cemophora lineri K.L. Williams, B.C. Brown & L.D. Wilson, 1966

Synonyms
- Cemophora coccinea lineri K.L. Williams, B.C. Brown & L.D. Wilson, 1966; Cemophora lineri — Weinell & Austin, 2017

= Texas scarlet snake =

Species of snake

The Texas scarlet snake (Cemophora lineri) is a species of nonvenomous snake in the subfamily Colubrinae of the family Colubridae. The species is native to the South Central United States. It was previously considered a subspecies of Cemophora coccinea.

== Etymology ==
The specific name or epithet, lineri, is in honor of American herpetologist Ernest A. Liner (1925–2010), who collected the first specimen in 1963.

== Geographic range ==
C. lineri is found in southern Texas. Its range does not overlap with the other species of scarlet snake.

== Description ==
The Texas scarlet snake is the larger of the two scarlet snake species, and is capable of growing to a total length (including tail) of 66 cm (26 inches). It has a gray or white background color, with distinct red blotches that have black borders. Unlike the other species, the black borders do not join on the sides. Its belly is a solid white or gray.

== Behavior ==
Like all scarlet snakes (genus Cemophora), the Texas scarlet snake is a secretive burrower, spending most of its time under ground. It prefers sandy thicket habitats along the Gulf of Mexico coastline.

== Diet ==
The preferred diet of C. lineri is the eggs of other reptiles, but it will also eat small rodents and lizards.
