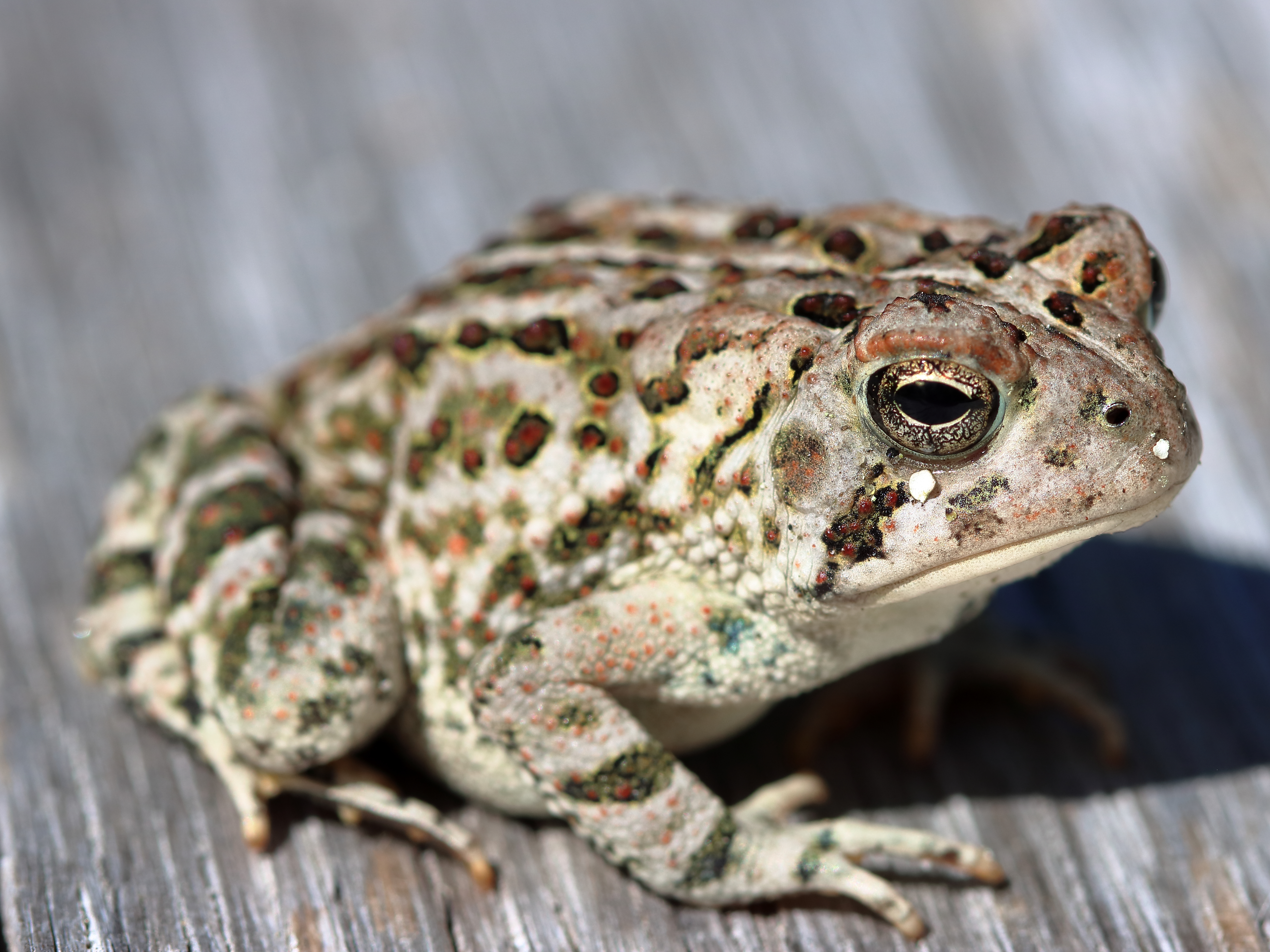

Conservation status
- Near Threatened (IUCN 3.1)

- Secure (NatureServe)

Scientific classification
- Kingdom: Animalia
- Phylum: Chordata
- Class: Amphibia
- Order: Anura
- Family: Bufonidae
- Genus: Anaxyrus
- Species: A. fowleri

Binomial name
- Anaxyrus fowleri (Hinckley, 1882)
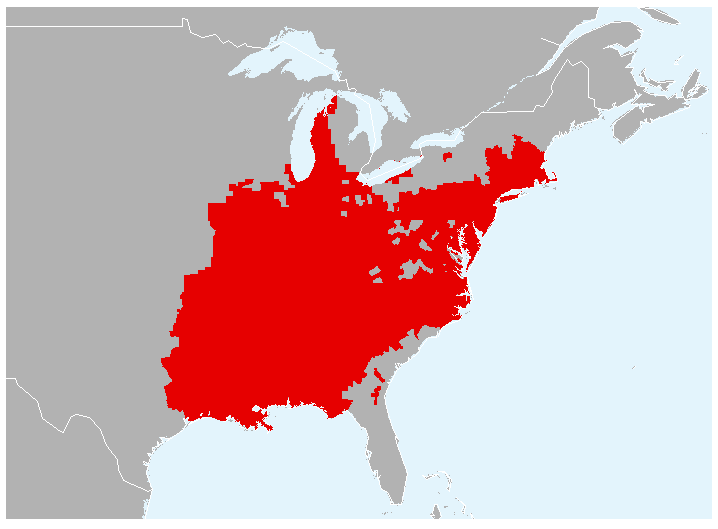

Synonyms
- Bufo fowleri Hinckley, 1882; Bufo lentiginosus fowleri — Garman, 1884; Bufo woodhousii fowleri — H.M. Smith, 1934; Bufo compactilis fowleri — Linsdale, 1940; Anaxyrus fowleri — Frost et al., 2006; Bufo (Anaxyrus) fowleri — Fouquette & Dubois, 2014

= Anaxyrus fowleri =

Fowler's toad

Species of amphibian

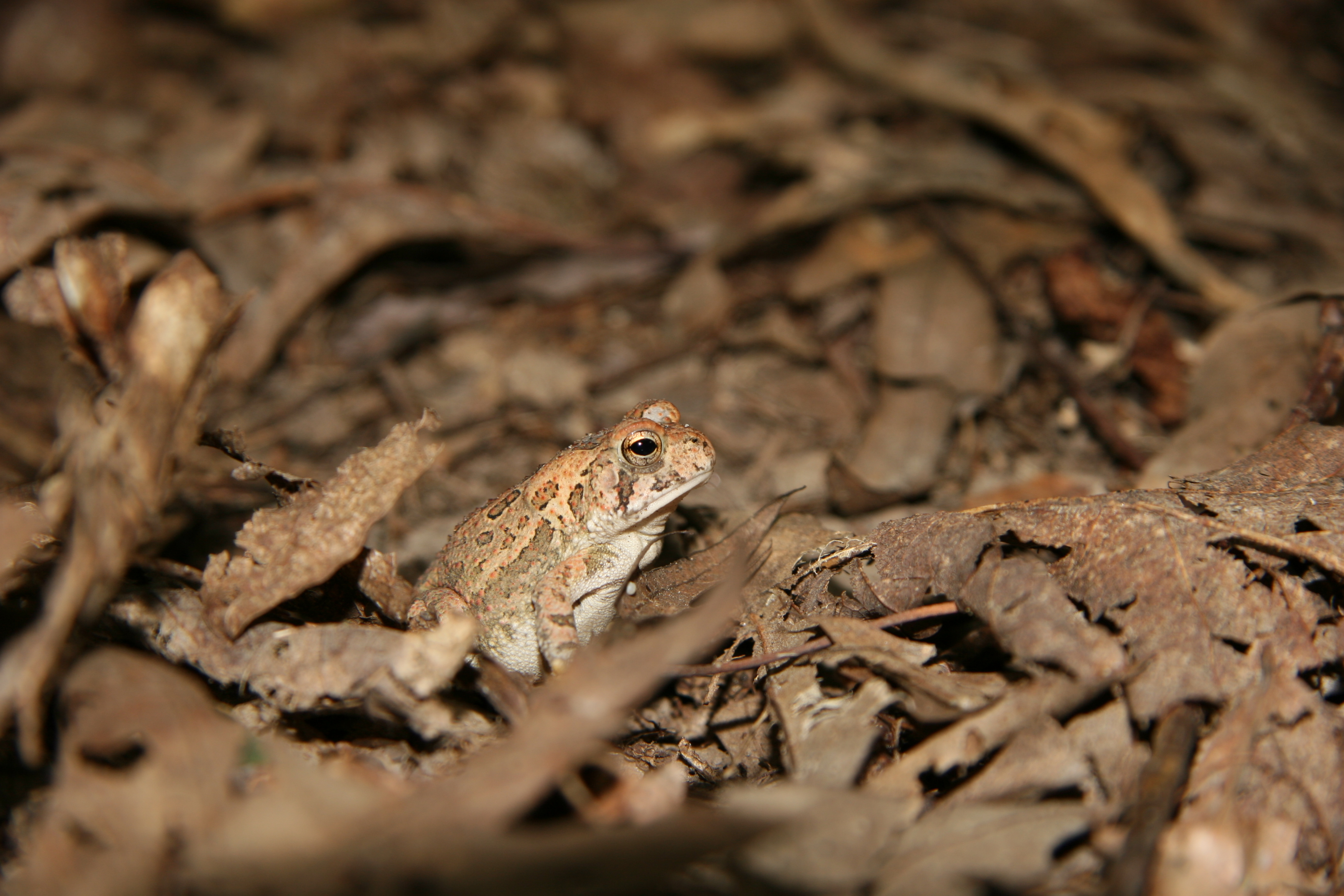
Fowler's toad in leaf litter

Anaxyrus fowleri, Fowler's toad, is a species of toad in the family Bufonidae. The species is native to North America, where it occurs in much of the eastern United States and parts of adjacent Canada. It was previously considered a subspecies of Woodhouse's toad (Anaxyrus woodhousii, formerly Bufo woodhousii).

== Etymology ==
The specific name, fowleri, is in honor of naturalist Samuel Page Fowler (1800–1888) from Massachusetts, who was a founder of the Essex County Natural History Society, which later became the Essex Institute.

== Description ==
Fowler's toad is usually brown, grey, olive green and rust red in color with darkened warty spots. If the toad has a pale stripe on its back, it is an adult. The belly is usually uniformly whitish except for one dark spot. The male may be darker in overall color than the female.

The adult toad is typically 5 to 9.5 cm (2.0 to 3.7 in) in head-body length. The tadpole is oval with a long tail and upper and lower fins, and is 1 to 1.4 cm (0.39 to 0.55 in) long. Body size is found to be dependent on the toad's environment. Higher temperatures produce smaller sized toads due to an increase in ectothermic metabolism with decreased resources.

== Range ==
Their native geographic range is eastern North America. Their range extends throughout most of the southeastern and eastern United States and parts of southeastern Canada. They reside in areas near temporary or permanent wetlands as well as forested areas.

== Reproduction ==
Fowler's toad reproduces in warmer seasons of the year, especially in May and June. It breeds in open, shallow waters such as ponds, lakeshores, and marshes. The male produces a call which attracts not only females, but also other males. The calling male may attempt to mate with one of the other males, which will then produce a chirping "release call", informing him of his mistake. It has been found that male Fowler's toads mating calls are affected by the body size and temperature of the caller. Females are often able to discriminate between variations in these calls and select the largest available males. Researchers found that males spend more time at breeding sites than females. Males are able to alter their calls to make them seem more attractive to females through thermoregulation. When a male finds a female, the pair will initiate amplexus and up to 7,000 to 10,000 eggs are fertilized. They hatch in 2 to 7 days. Based on observations, Fowler's toads breed repeatedly through the spring. As many as 10 different age classes, separated by several days, have been observed over the course of a breeding season in one small pond. A new tadpole may reach sexual maturity in one season, but the process may take up to three years.

Fowler's toad regularly hybridizes with two of its close relatives: the American toad and the Woodhouse's toad. The Woodhouse's toad subspecies Anaxyrus woodhousii velatus, or the East Texas toad, is possibly a hybrid of the Woodhouse's toad and the Fowler's toad.

== Behavior ==
Predators of Fowler's toad include snakes, birds, and small mammals. It uses defensive coloration to blend into its surroundings. It also secretes a noxious compound from the warts on its back. The secretion, containing toxic bufadienolides, is distasteful to predators and can be lethal to small mammals. The toad is also known to play dead. When Fowler's toads were moved to a new location, they often traveled back in the direction they came from rather than continuing normal movement patterns.

== Habitat ==
Fowler's toad lives in open woodlands, sand prairies, meadows, and beaches. It burrows into the ground during hot, dry periods and during the winter. They are often found hiding under broad leaved plants, amidst clumps of grass, and inside or under logs. Their springtime emergence is associated with increased temperature, relatively little rainfall or wind, and a gibbous moon. At Long Point, Ontario, Fowler's toads use shallow marshes and pools for breeding but spend the summer months in nearby dune and beach habitats.

== Diet ==
The adult Fowler's toad eats insects and other small terrestrial invertebrates, but avoids earthworms, unlike its close relative, the American toad (Anaxyrus americanus). This toad also has been shown to eat velvet ants, which is a wasp that gives a very painful sting to humans, but does nothing to the toad. The tadpole scrapes algae and bacterial mats from rocks and plants using the tooth-like structures in its mouth.

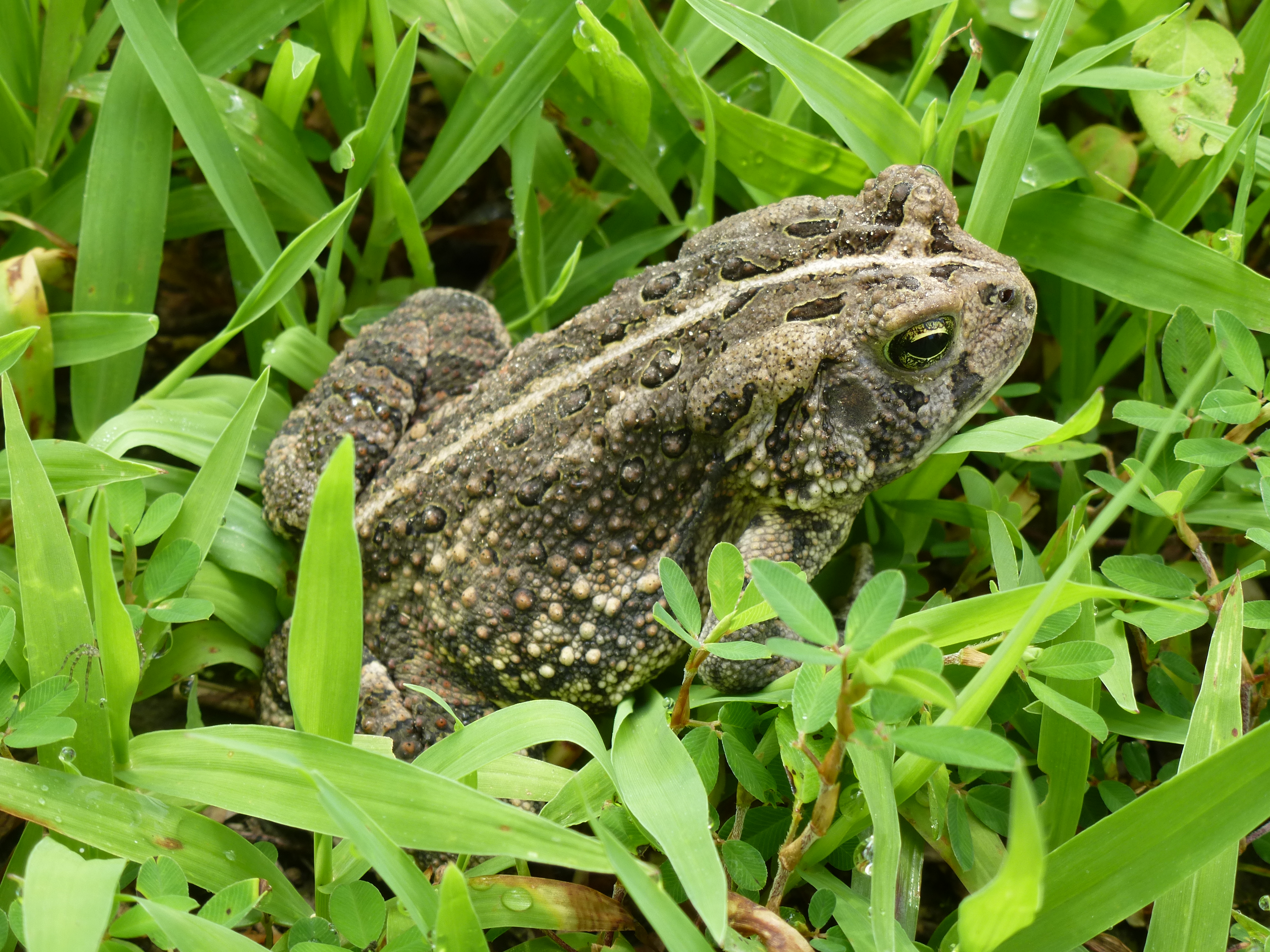
In Missouri Ozarks

== Conservation status ==
An important conservation measure for Fowler's toad is the protection of its breeding sites. Off-road vehicles commonly used in beach and dune habitats are damaging to this species. Agricultural chemicals have caused declines in some areas. These factors along with specific habitat requirements and excessive human activity within these habitats produces permanent, local extinctions. Along with this, the invasion of common reed (Phragmites australis) has been identified as a threat to some breeding habitats used by Canadian populations of Fowler's toad. It is considered a species at risk in Ontario, a species of special concern in the U.S. state of New Jersey, and a regionally threatened or endangered species in the states of New Hampshire and Vermont. On April 15, 2024, Canada Post released a stamp with a Fowler's toad to raise public awareness of these amphibians.
