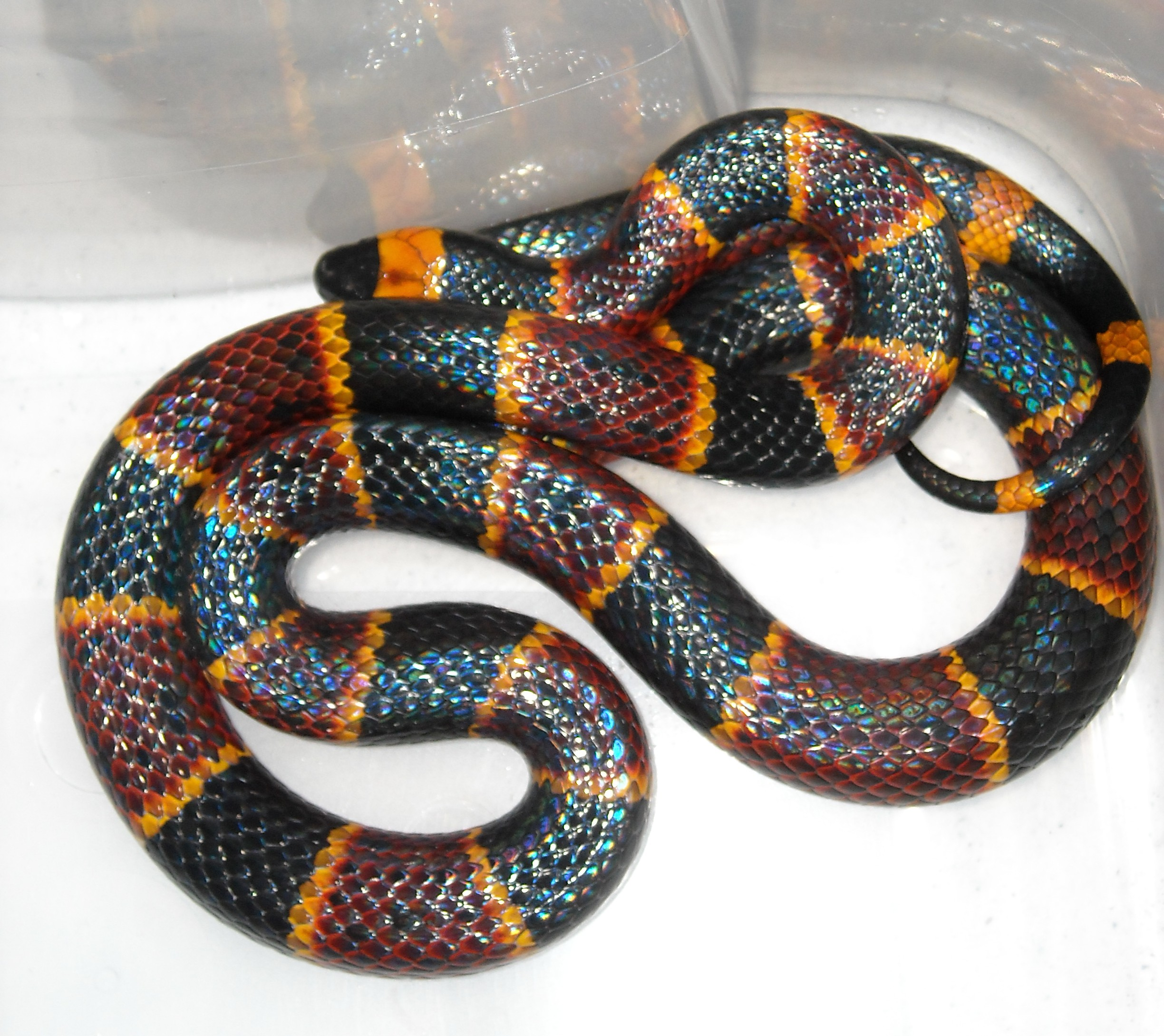
- In Jacksonville, Florida

Conservation status
- Least Concern (IUCN 3.1)

Scientific classification
- Kingdom: Animalia
- Phylum: Chordata
- Class: Reptilia
- Order: Squamata
- Suborder: Serpentes
- Family: Elapidae
- Genus: Micrurus
- Species: M. fulvius

Binomial name
- Micrurus fulvius (Linnaeus, 1766)

Synonyms
- List: Coluber fulvius Linnaeus, 1766; Elaps fulvius — Daudin, 1803; Vipera fulvia — Harlan, 1826; Elaps tristis Baird & Girard, 1853; Elaps fulvius — Boulenger, 1896; Micrurus fulvius fulvius — Schmidt, 1928; Micrurus fulvius barbouri Schmidt, 1928; Micruroides fulvius — Stickel, 1952

= Micrurus fulvius =

Species of snake

Micrurus fulvius, commonly known as the eastern coral snake, common coral snake, American cobra, and more, is a species of highly venomous coral snake in the family Elapidae. The species is endemic to the southeastern United States. The family also contains the cobras and sea snakes.

Its appearance is sometimes confused with that of the scarlet snake (Cemophora coccinea) or scarlet kingsnake (Lampropeltis elapsoides), which are nonvenomous mimics. No subspecies are recognized as being valid. Although the International Union for the Conservation of Nature (IUCN) listed M. fulvius as "Least Concern" in 2007 based on its total global population size (Hammerson, 2007), it is of significant conservation concern at the local level throughout most of its range; it is listed as Endangered in North Carolina (North Carolina Wildlife Resources Commission, 2014), Imperiled in South Carolina (South Carolina Department of Natural Resources, 2014), and of Highest Conservation Concern in Alabama (Outdoor Alabama, 2017).

== Taxonomy ==
Micrurus tener used to be considered a subspecies of Micrurus fulvius. However, DNA analysis suggests that it may be its own species as the analysis of microsatellites loci seems to place M. tener as a distinct species from M. fulvius.

== Common names ==
Among the many common names for Micrurus fulvius are eastern coral snake, American cobra, candy-stick snake, common coral snake, coral adder, Elaps harlequin snake, Florida coral snake, harlequin coral snake, North American coral snake, red bead snake, thunder-and-lightning snake, and, in Spanish, serpiente-coralillo arlequín (literally "harlequin coral snake").

== Description ==
Micrurus fulvius is usually less than 80 cm (31 in) in total length (tail included). The maximum reported total lengths are 121.8 cm (48.0 in) for a specimen in Florida (Neill, 1958) and 129.5 cm (51.0 in) (Roze, 1996). Males have longer tails than females, but females reach a greater total length.

The dorsal scales are smooth, and are in 15 rows at midbody. The ventral scales number 197–217 in males and 219–233 in females. There are 40–47 subcaudals in males and 30–37 in females. The anal plate is divided.

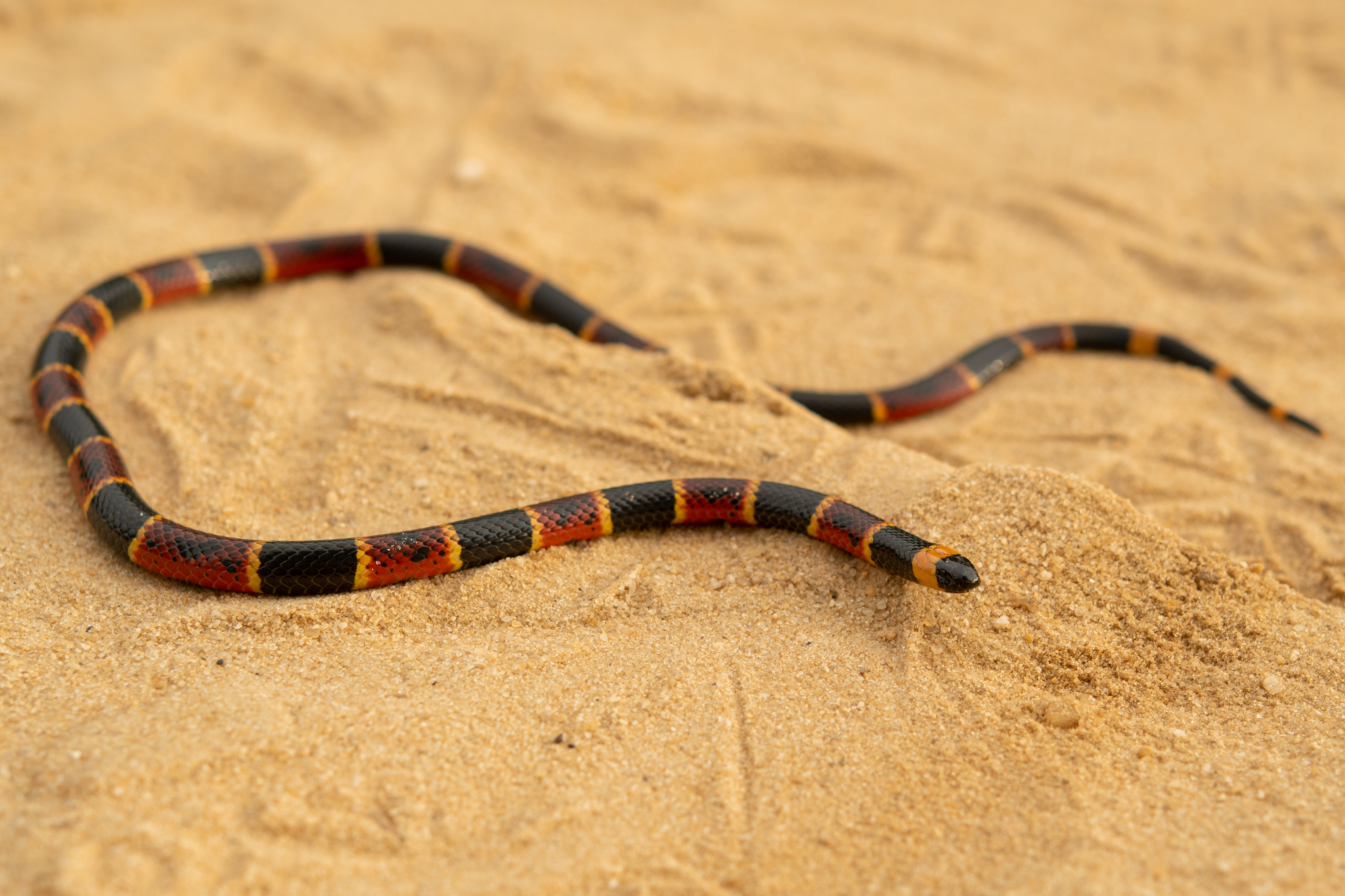
In Putnam County, Florida

=== Aposematic colour pattern ===
The color pattern of the eastern coral snake consists of a series of rings that encircle the body: wide red and black rings separated by narrow yellow rings. The head is black from the rostral scale to just behind the eyes. This snake commonly has a black snout as well as black eyes and then a yellow band on the back half of the head behind the eyes. The red rings are usually speckled with black.

The bright coloration is likely aposematic, meaning that it is associated with a danger to predators. Within its natural range, folk rhymes about the coloration of the eastern coral snake versus its mimics are common, including:

- "Red on yellow, kill a fellow; red on black, poison lack"
- "Red on black, friend of Jack, red on yellow, bite a fellow"
- "Red and yellow, kill a fellow"

These rhymes are useful in teaching children to distinguish king snakes (genus Lampropeltis), and the scarlet snake (Cemophora coccinea), which are considered helpful predators of vermin such as rats and mice, from the venomous eastern coral snake, which should only be handled by an experienced biologist or herpetologist. However, this rhyme is only applicable to species in the southern United States and not anywhere else.

== Distribution ==
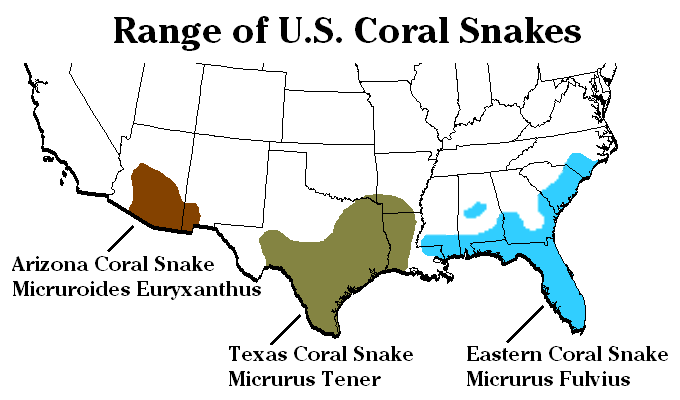
U.S. coral snake species range

Micrurus fulvius ranges throughout the Southeastern United States, throughout all of Florida, extending northward to the southern coast of North Carolina. Coral snakes in Texas, western Louisiana, and southeastern Arkansas are now considered to be a different species, Micrurus tener, which was previously considered a subspecies of M. fulvius. M. fulvius may be found at altitudes of near sea level to about 400 m (1,300 ft).

The current range of the eastern coral snake is predicted to expand as a result of climate change. Future models predict that the range could expand up to 200 km (120 mi) northward

== Habitat ==
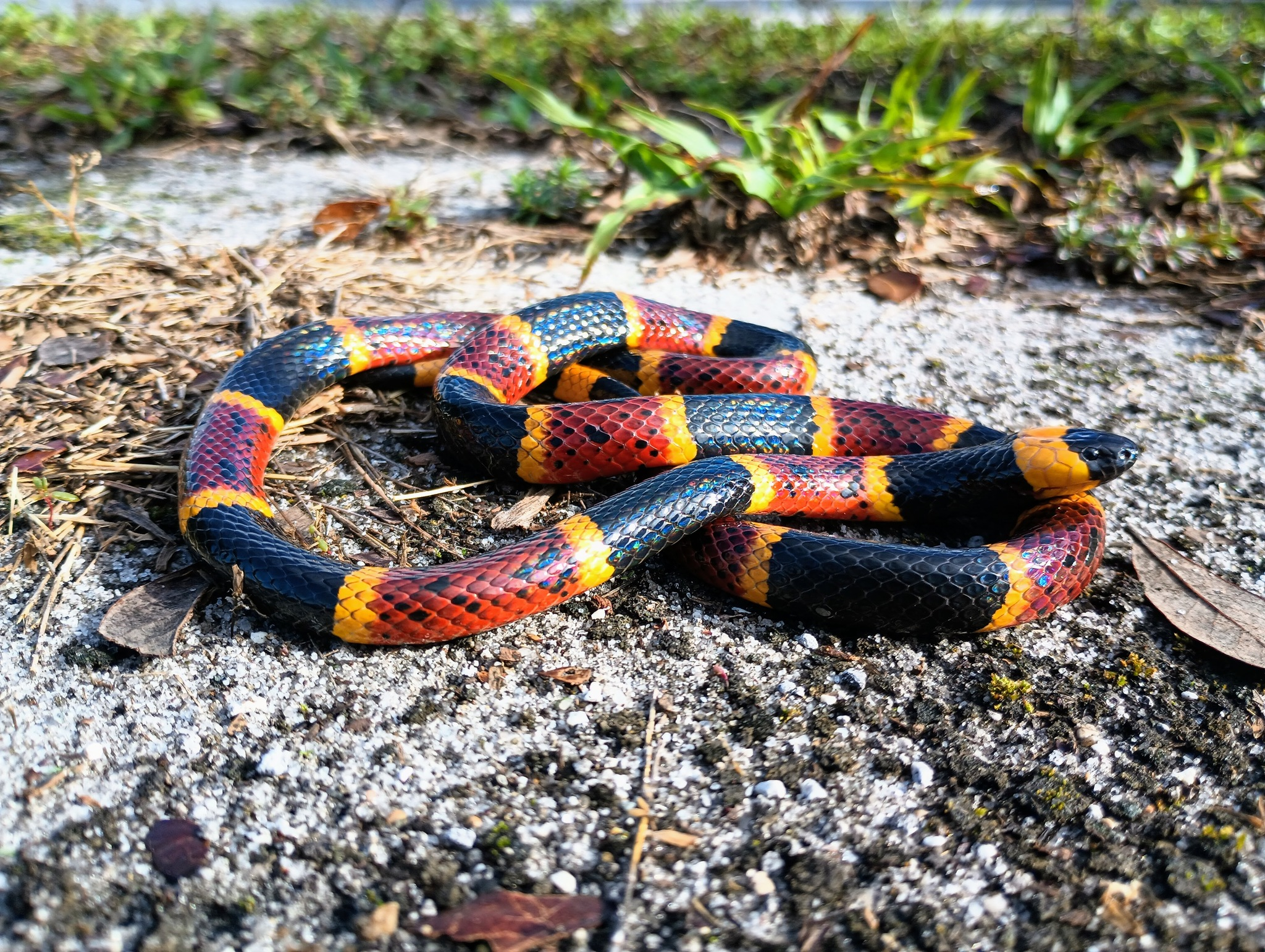
In Polk County, Florida

Micrurus fulvius occurs in upland mesophytic and tropical hammocks in Florida, as well as glade land, high pine, scrub oak and live oak hammock, slash pine and wiregrass flatwoods. In southern Georgia and Florida, it is found in dry areas with open ground that are bushy but not heavily vegetated. It is associated with sandy ridges in Mississippi and sandy creek bottoms in Louisiana. M. fulvius prefers sandy soils at a relatively fine scale within scrubby habitats.

== Diet ==
Micrurus fulvius eats primarily other snakes and attenuate lizards, but it is also known to eat mammals, birds, frogs, fish, and insects. M. fulvius will attack the head of its prey first in order to envenomate it. M. fulvius holds on to the prey until it becomes paralyzed, then consumes it.

== Reproduction ==
Micrurus fulvius reproduction occurs via internal fertilization through the use of hemipenes. Sexually mature adults breed from late summer and early autumn to late spring and early summer, and bred females lay eggs in mid-summer. Females are reported to lay between 3 to 12 eggs in June which hatch in September. Hatchlings are 18–23 cm (7.1–9.1 in) in total length (tail included). Males mature 11–16 months after hatching while females mature approximately 26 months after hatching. Adult females are typically larger than males. There has been no recorded incidence of any type of parental care for hatchlings.

== Ecology ==
=== Behavior ===
Coral snakes of the genus Micrurus spend most of their time underground (fossoriality) or sheltering under suitable objects, but can be active on the surface during the day in early spring or at other times when rainfall has saturated the ground. They appear not to be generally surface active at night. Coral snakes are largely diurnal, making night sightings rare Males are most active in the late fall or early spring, when they search for mates, and females are most active in late summer and throughout the fall, when they search for prey that will allow them to build energy reserves for the next season's reproductive effort. Coral snakes will attempt to escape if discovered, and individuals may engage in complex defensive behavior if prevented from doing so. This includes hiding the head beneath the body coils, mimicking the head with their tail by crawling backward and striking with the tail, erratic body movements, and death feigning. Other individuals can be touchy, and will readily bite if restrained in any way.

== Venom ==
The venom of Micrurus fulvius is a potent neurotoxin with a median LD_{50} of 1.3 mg/kg SC. Envenomation causes rapid paralysis and respiratory failure in prey. In humans, symptoms include local pain, sialorrhea, paresthesia, ptosis, slurred speech, double vision, blurred vision, weakness, paralysis, fasciculation and diplopia. In severe cases, envenomation may progress to respiratory arrest and muscular paralysis eventually leading to respiratory failure. It is estimated that 5 mg of venom can be lethal to humans.

M. fulvius bites and fatalities are very rare. Only two documented fatalities were attributed to this species in the 1950s, and only one has been reported since Wyeth antivenin became available for it in the 1960s. The snakes have a mortality rate between 5–20%. The most recent fatality attributed to the eastern coral snake occurred in 2006 (confirmed in 2009 report). The victim failed to seek proper medical attention and died several hours after being bitten, becoming the first fatality caused by M. fulvius in over 40 years.

The snake is considered secretive and generally reluctant to bite, and envenomation is thought to occur in only 40% of all bites. Although, a study conducted in 1987 found that envenomation occurred in 75% of coral snake bites. Unlike New World pit vipers, this New World coral snake cannot control the amount of primarily neurotoxic venom injected. Dry bites often result from a near miss or deflection; although the venom an adult coral snake holds is enough to kill up to five adults, it cannot release all its venom in a single bite. Historically, the mortality rate was estimated to be about 10–20%, with death occurring in as little as one to two hours after the bite.

=== Antivenin availability ===
Wyeth discontinued the manufacture of coral snake antivenin in 2010, citing a lack of profitability. Pfizer has also decided to halt production of its antivenin for similar reasons (see Coral snake antivenom shortage). As of July 2021, Pfizer indicates that antivenom is available and one source states that production has resumed.
