= Anna Allen Wright =

US herpetologist and naturalist (1882–1864)

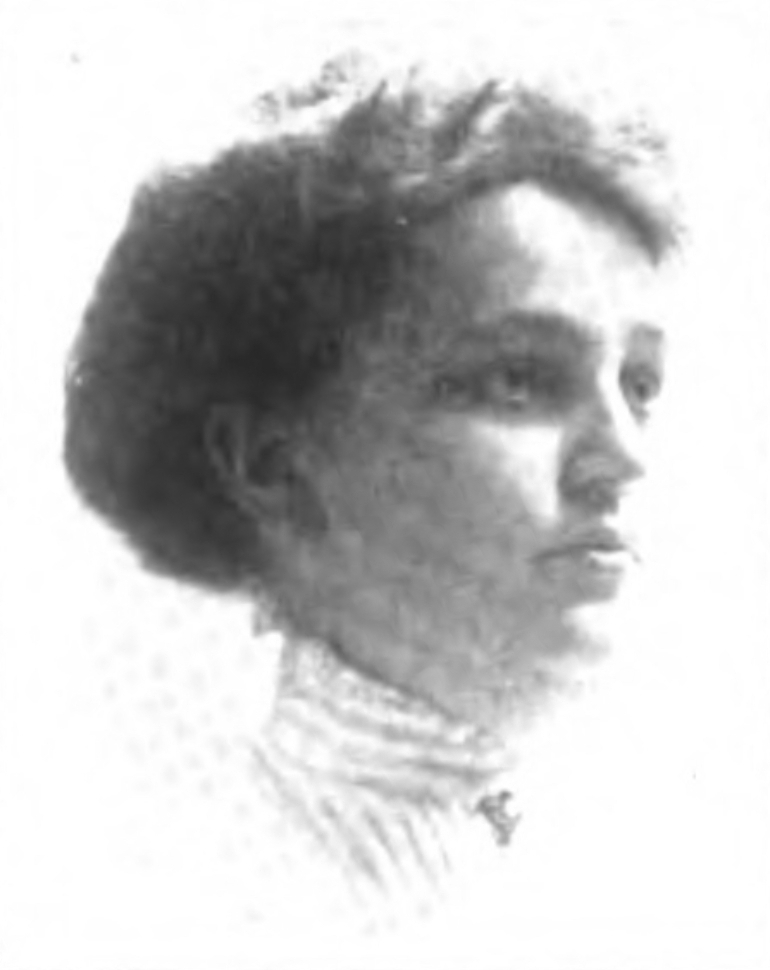
- Born: Anna Maria Allen; March 4, 1882; Buffalo, New York
- Died: December 5, 1964 (aged 82); Ithaca, New York
- Education: Cornell University
- Occupation: Herpetologist
- Notable work: Handbook of Frogs and Toads: The Frogs and Toads of the United States and Canada (1933); The Handbook of Snakes (1957)
- Spouse: Albert Hazen Wright
- Relatives: Arthur A. Allen (brother)

Anna Allen Wright (née Anna Maria Allen; 4 March 1882 – 5 December 1964) was an American herpetologist, and a recognized authority on the ecology and natural history of amphibians and reptiles.

== Life ==
Anna Maria Allen was born in Buffalo, New York, on 4 March 1882. She graduated from Cornell University in 1909, where she was elected to Sigma Xi. Her brother, Arthur A. Allen was an ornithologist.

In 1910, she married Albert Hazen Wright. They collaborated on natural history projects, writing and illustrating several books in the Handbooks of American Natural History series, published by Cornell University's Comstock Press. Their Handbook of Frogs and Toads: The Frogs and Toads of the United States and Canada was published in 1933, the first in Comstock's Handbook series. It was dedicated to "four American women who, in addition to serving the public and science generously, have in the last half-century contributed most notably to the study of this group". They were Mary Hewes Hinckley (1845–1944), Mary Cynthia Dickerson (1866–1923), Helen Dean King (1869–1955), and Helen Thompson Gaige (1890–1976). This unusual dedication in a scientific work of the period has been speculated to have been largely thanks to Anna.

The Handbook of Snakes of the United States and Canada (in two volumes) followed in 1957.

The Wrights traveled extensively in order to compile their handbooks, working to observe every species of snake in North America, gathering data and live specimens. The Handbook of Snakes contained more than 300 species and subspecies, with photographs, drawings, and distribution maps. These were accompanied by excerpts from the Wrights' field journals. Anna Allen Wright provided illustrations. The couple have been described as "constant companions in and out of science."

Wright also contributed 500 of her pictures to the Handbook of Turtles and the Handbook of Lizards. She was known as a capable botanist and floriculturist, as well as a versatile naturalist.

Anna Allen Wright died at home in Ithaca, New York on 5 December 1964.

== Legacy ==
Following her death, a memorial fund for the Cornell University Library was established in Wright's name.

In his foreword to the 1995 edition of the Handbook of Frogs and Toads, Roy McDiarmid wrote:

I would guess that no North American scientist in the first half of this century had a more profound effect on students interested in the ecological aspects of the natural history of frogs than Anna Allen and Albert Hazen Wright.

He also noted that although "Albert Hazen Wright received numerous accolades during his distinguished career", he was "unaware of any bestowed on Anna, even though she likely deserved many".

In 2019, the Handbook of Frogs and Toads was selected as one of Cornell University Press' 150 most notable books.
