= Albert Hazen Wright =

American herpetologist

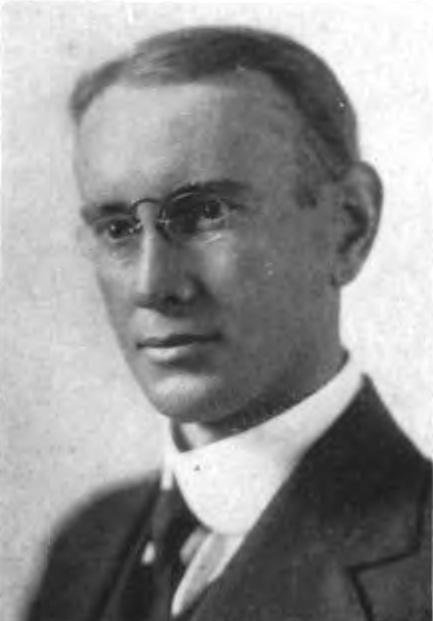
- Born: August 15, 1879; Hilton, New York, United States
- Died: July 5, 1970 (aged 90); Ithaca, New York
- Education: Cornell University
- Scientific career
- Fields: Herpetology
- Workplaces: Cornell University

Albert Hazen Wright (August 15, 1879 – July 5, 1970) was an American herpetologist and professor at Cornell University. He was also an honorary member of the International Ornithological Congress. He did a great deal of study of the Okefenokee Swamp. In 1955 he won the Eminent Ecologist Award.

== Biography ==
Albert Hazen Wright was born on August 15, 1879, in Hilton, New York, to parents Delos C. Wright and Emily Hazen. His parents also had a younger daughter named Mabel. On June 25, 1910, Wright married his wife, Anna Maria Allen, whom he met at Cornell University. Wright died on July 5, 1970, in Ithaca, New York, at the age of ninety.

== Education and career ==
Wright attended Hilton High School and Brockport Normal School, and upon graduating high school, enrolled at Cornell University in Ithaca, New York, where he studied herpetology. He earned his PhD from Cornell in vertebrate zoology in 1908.

Both Wright and his wife were interested in studying amphibians; as such, they would eventually co-author the 1949 Handbook of Snakes of the United States and Canada and Handbook of Frogs and Toads of the United States and Canada after years of extensive travel. The handbooks were finally published in 1957 and outline over 300 species. Perhaps Wright's most notable work is that which was completed between 1921 and 1922 at Okefinokee Swamp in Georgia; as a result, Wright authored the book Life-Histories of the Frogs of Okefinokee Swamp, which he originally intended to be used as a reference source for teachers and students alike. It outlined the reproductive process of various amphibian communities native to the swamp. A recent edition of this work contains a foreword by J. Whitfield Gibbons. Furthermore, he also worked with Frances Harper, a scientist who researched the culture behind Okefinokee Swamp.

In addition to herpetology, Wright was also interested in genealogy and researched the Wright family, as well as the history of Cornell University.

== Professional affiliations ==
Wright's achievements include being named an honorary member of the International Ornithological Congress, being elected the second vice president of the Dewitt Historical Society, and winning the Eminent Ecologist Award in 1955.

== Legacy ==
Wright is commemorated in the scientific name of a subspecies of lizard, Urosaurus ornatus wrighti. Wright and his wife are jointly commemorated in the scientific name of a subspecies of snake, Storeria dekayi wrightorum.

== Major publications ==
- Life-Histories of the Frogs of Okefinokee Swamp – 1931
- Our Georgia-Florida Frontier: The Okefenokee Swamp, its History and Cartography – 1945
- Handbook of Snakes of the United States and Canada – 1957
- Handbook of Frogs and Toads of the United States and Canada – 1957
