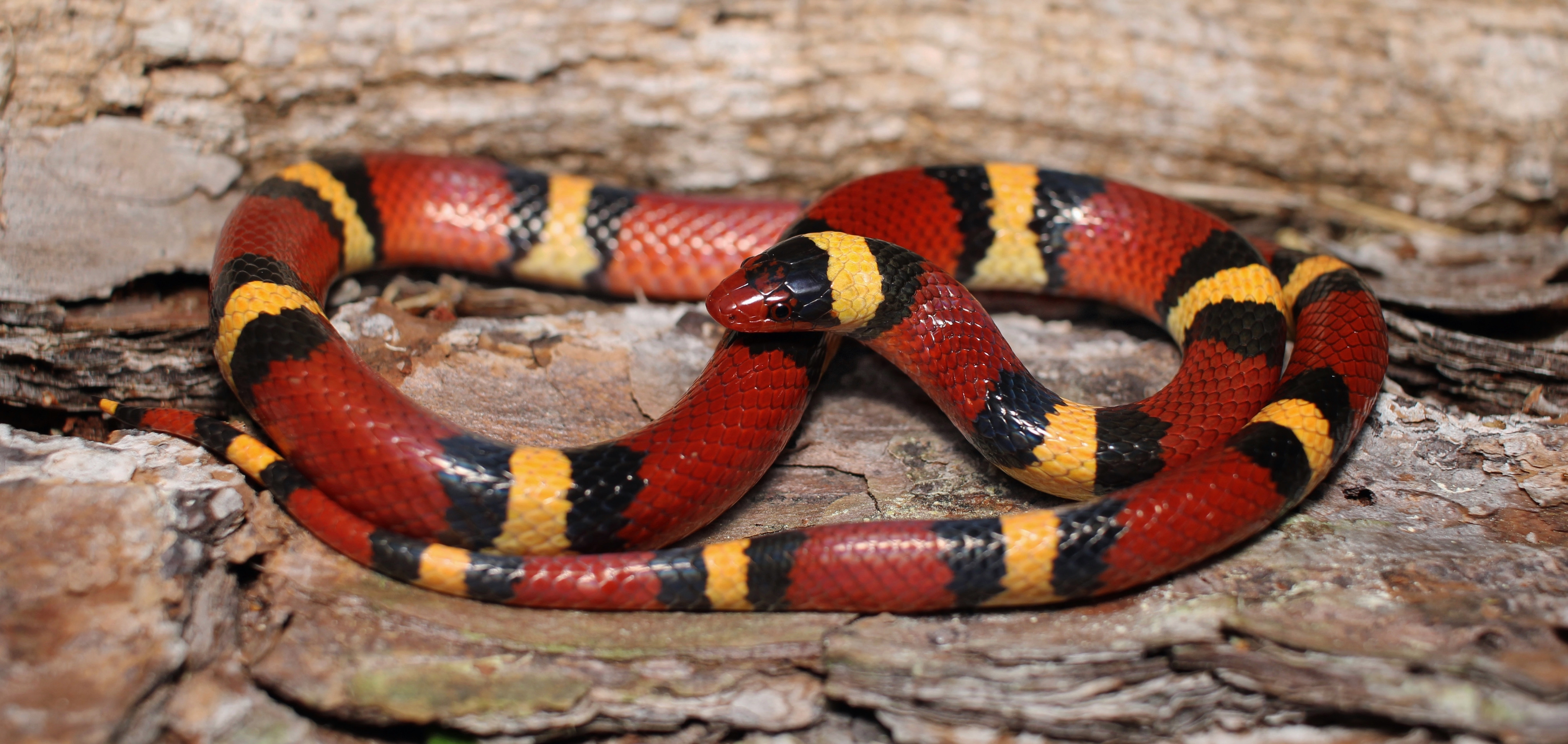
- Adult Lampropeltis elapsoides in Florida

Conservation status
- Least Concern (IUCN 3.1)

Scientific classification
- Kingdom: Animalia
- Phylum: Chordata
- Class: Reptilia
- Order: Squamata
- Suborder: Serpentes
- Family: Colubridae
- Genus: Lampropeltis
- Species: L. elapsoides

Binomial name
- Lampropeltis elapsoides (Holbrook, 1838)
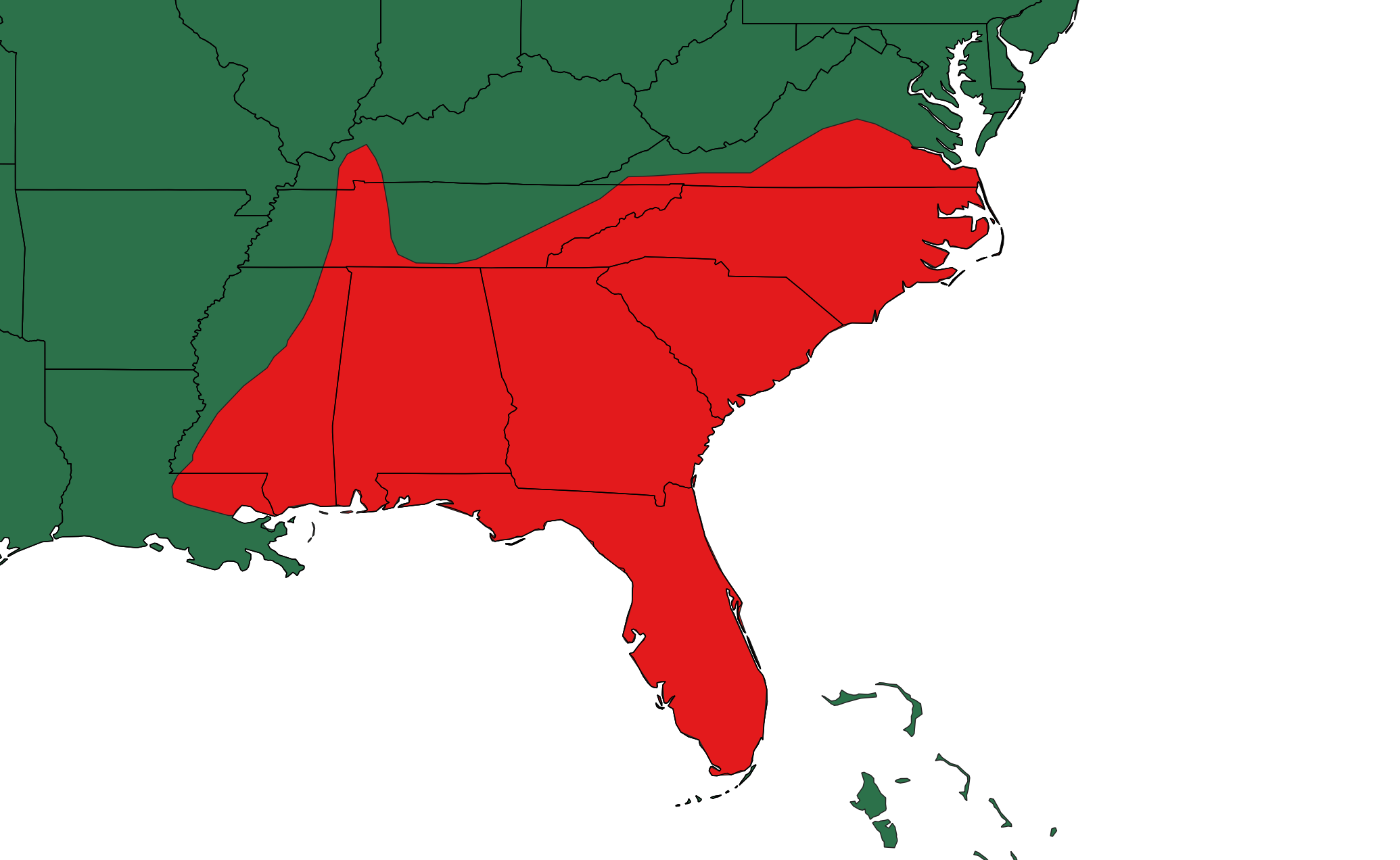

Synonyms
- Coluber elapsoides Holbrook, 1838; Osceola elapsoidea — Cope, 1900; Lampropeltis elapsoides — Stejneger & Barbour, 1917; Lampropeltis triangulum elapsoides — Conant & Collins, 1991; Lampropeltis elapsoides — Pyron & Burbrink, 2009

= Scarlet kingsnake =

Species of snake found in the eastern US

The scarlet kingsnake (Lampropeltis elapsoides) is a species of kingsnake found in the southeastern and eastern portions of the United States. Like all kingsnakes, they are nonvenomous. They are found in pine flatwoods, hydric hammocks, pine savannas, mesic pine-oak forests, prairies, cultivated fields, and a variety of suburban habitats; not unusually, people find scarlet kingsnakes in their swimming pools, especially during the spring.

Until recently, and for much of the 20th century, scarlet kingsnakes were considered a subspecies of the milk snake; however, Pyron and Bubrink demonstrated the phylogenetic distinction of this species and its closer relationship to the mountain kingsnakes of the southwestern United States.

These largely fossorial snakes are the smallest of all the species within the genus Lampropeltis, usually ranging from 40 to 50 cm (16 to 20 in) at maturity. The maximum recorded length is in Jonesboro, AR 76.2 cm (30.0 in). Hatchlings range in size from 8 to 18 cm (3.1 to 7.1 in).

== Taxonomy ==
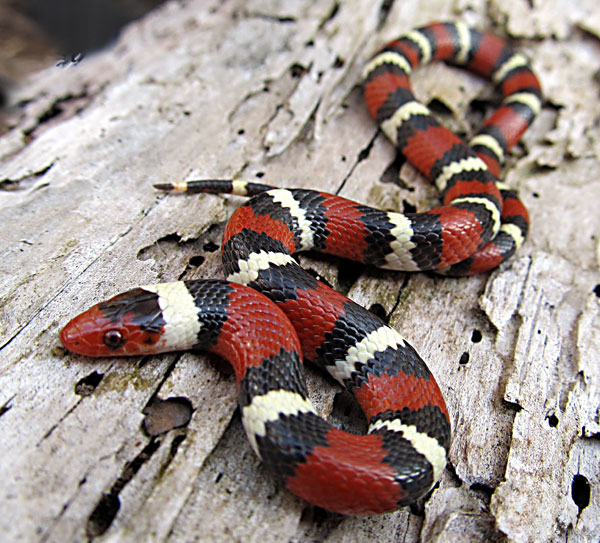
Juvenile, Florida locale

Juvenile scarlet kingsnake found swimming in a pool in Davenport, FL

The generic name, Lampropeltis, is derived from the Ancient Greek lamprós (λαμπρος) meaning "shiny" and peltas (πελτας) meaning "shield", after the sheen of their scales. Its specific name, elapsoides, is a Latinization of the Greek word éllops (ελλοπς) which refers to coral and was used to describe the 19th century genus, Elaps (the type genus of the family Elapidae), which included the eastern coral snake (Micrurus fulvius), a venomous species which the scarlet kingsnake resembles and with which the scarlet kingsnake is partly sympatric. The range of scarlet kingsnakes extends considerably further north and northeast than the eastern coral snake.

The scarlet kingsnake was once believed to have intergraded with the eastern milk snake, which produced a variation once named as a subspecies called the Coastal Plains milk snake (L. t. temporalis), but this is no longer recognized as a legitimate taxon.

== Description ==
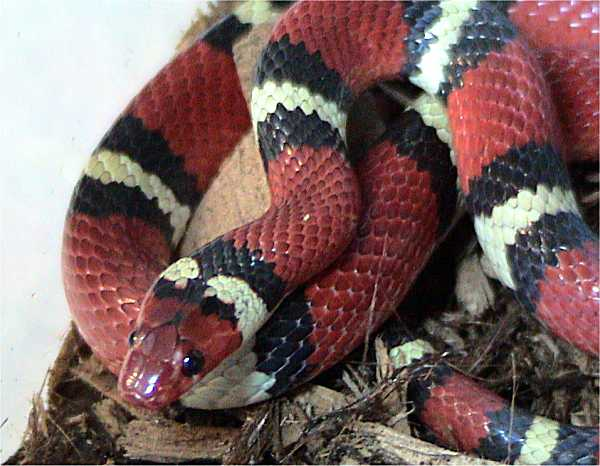

Scarlet kingsnakes have a tricolored pattern of black, red, white, and various shades of yellow bands that appear to mimic the venomous coral snake in a form of Batesian mimicry. This method relies on generalization by predators that do not recognize that the mimicry of a Coral snake that the Scarlet King Snake's pattern displays is imperfect. A method to help us differentiate between venomous and non-venomous tricolor snakes in North America is found in an enormous variety of popular phrases, which are usually some variation of "Red touches black, friend of jack, red touches yellow, kill a fellow", "red on yellow, kill a fellow; red on black, venom lack", or "if red touches yellow, you're a dead fellow; if red touches black, you're all right, Jack". For tri-colored snakes found east of the Mississippi River, all of these phrases can be replaced with the simple phrase, "Red face, I'm safe", in reference to the red snout of scarlet kingsnakes as opposed to the prominent black snout of the eastern coral snake (Micrurus fulvius).

Scarlet kingsnakes are born with white, black, and red banding. As they mature, they develop varying shades of yellow within geographic areas where this is expressed. In addition, the yellowing is not uniform, but rather this pigmentation proceeds from lighter to darker from the lowermost scales upward to the dorsum, or "back", presenting a multiple yellowish band. Early expression of yellowing appears as early as 3 months and continues through the first 3 years. As adults age, a gradual darkening of the yellowish banding occurs. The yellow pigmentation varies from lemon, to school-bus yellow, to tangerine, to apricot.

Scarlet kingsnakes are secretive, nocturnal, fossorial snakes, so are infrequently seen by people. They are excellent climbers. They can be found underneath the loose bark on rotting pines (which is a favorite place for them to hide during spring or during heavy rains), under the bark on dying or decaying pines and their stumps, and decaying wood, where they hunt for their favorite prey, small snakes and lizards, especially skinks.

Hatchling scarlet kingsnakes show a strong predisposition for ground skinks (Scincella lateralis), often to the exclusion of other prey items. One study showed that elongate squamates made up about 97% of these snakes diets, potentially due to their small mouths. Out of those elongate squamates, the aforementioned skinks made up 74%, while colubroid snakes made up only 15%. All prey items ingested in this study were consumed headfirst, and on average prey was 19% of predator mass. It has also been noted that the diet of Lampropeltis elapsoides is unusually narrow compared to adults of most other species.

== Reproduction ==
The scarlet kingsnake is polygynandrous, meaning both males and females will mate with multiple partners. They mate from late May to early June and females lay eggs in June and July. Females have multiple egg clutches that incubate for 40–65 days.

Lampropeltis elapsoides is an oviparous species of snake that lays eggs in clutches of 4-12, usually under rotting wood and between rocks and logs. These eggs are white and slender, with most adhering to one another. Eggs typically hatch within 2-2.5 months, though times may vary.

== Diet ==
Scarlet Kingsnakes are specialized predators with 82% being lizards and 89% skinks. This diet is the narrowest of all the Lampropeltis genus.

== In other media ==
=== Film ===
Scarlet kingsnakes were used to simulate coral snakes in the 2006 film Snakes on a Plane. A scarlet kingsnake also appears briefly as an unidentified venomous snake in an early scene of 2001 film The Mummy Returns.

=== Television ===
In Season 5 of Peep Show Super Hans rents a scarlet kingsnake as a prop for a house party. Despite Hans' mnemonic stating "Red next to black, jump the fuck back, red next to yellow, cuddly fellow", kingsnakes are not venomous.
