= List of reptiles of North Carolina =

This is a list of reptile species and subspecies found in North Carolina, based mainly on checklists from the North Carolina Museum of Natural Sciences. Common and scientific names are according to the Society for the Study of Amphibians and Reptiles publications.

- (I) - Introduced
- (V) - Venomous snake

== Alligator ==
Order: Crocodilia

Family: Alligatoridae
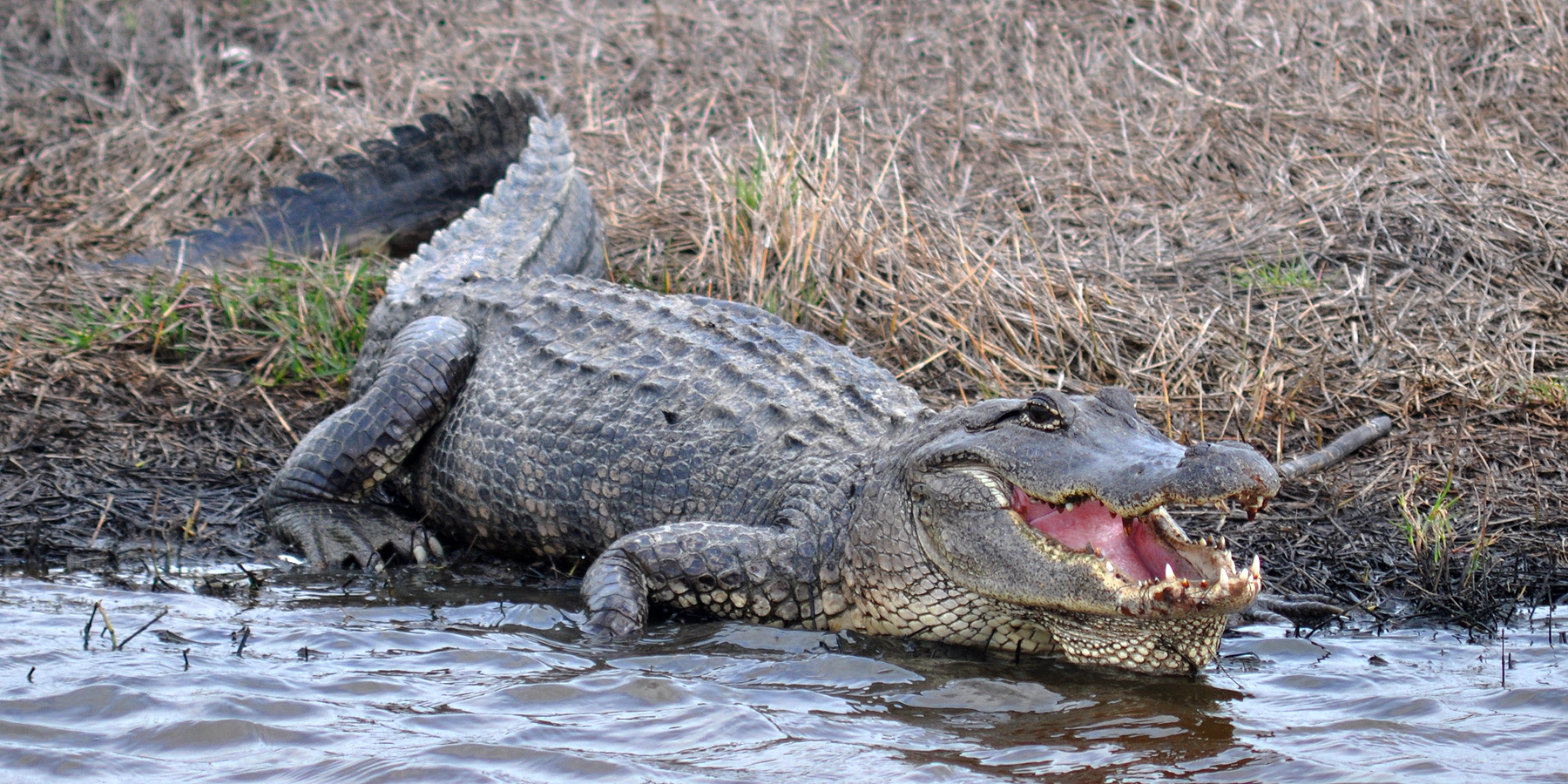
- American alligator Alligator mississippiensis

== Turtles ==
Order: Testudines

Suborder: Cryptodira

Family: Chelydridae
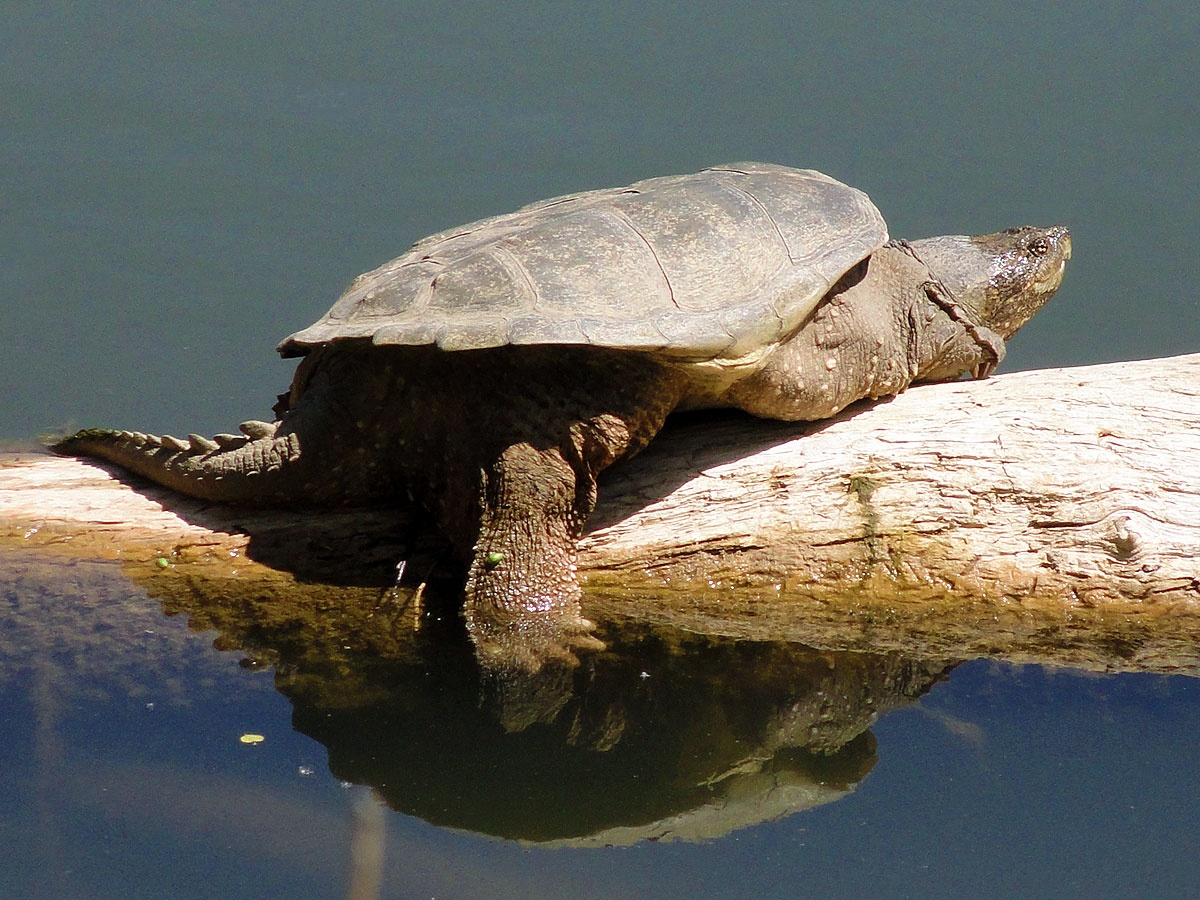
- Snapping turtle Chelydra serpentina
Family: Kinosternidae
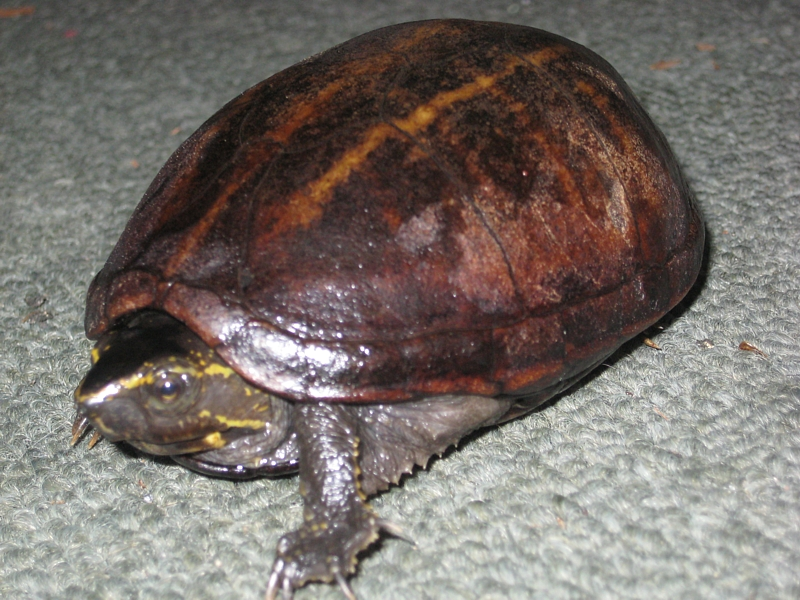
- Striped mud turtle Kinosternon baurii
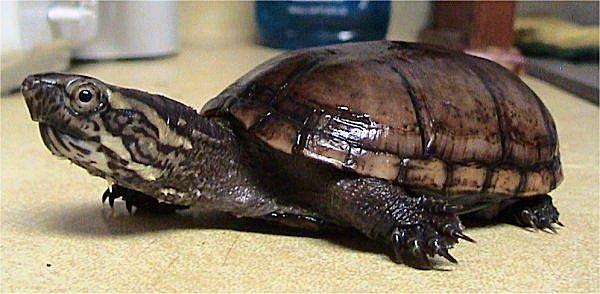
- Southeastern mud turtle Kinosternon subrubrum subrubrum
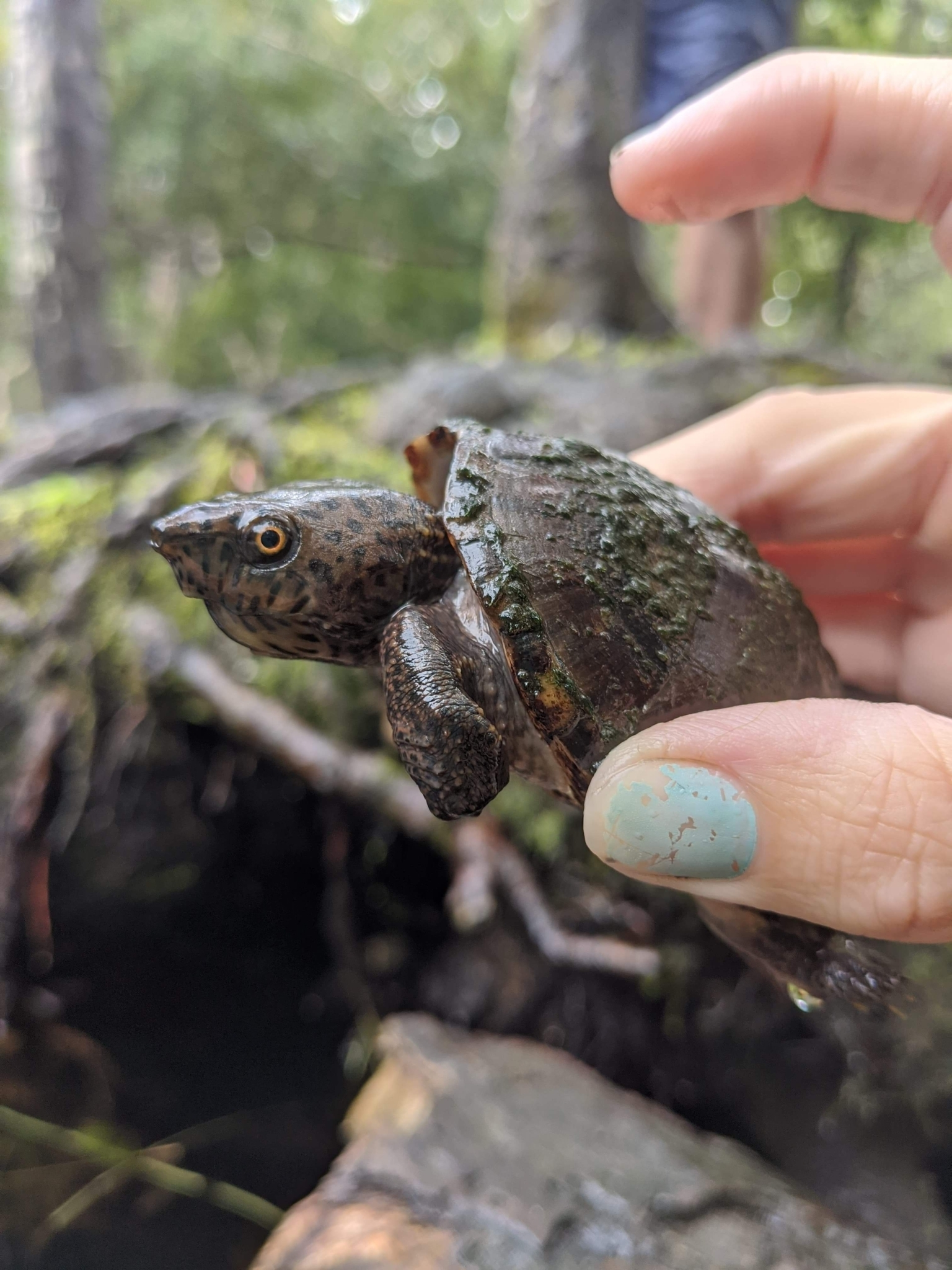
- Stripe-necked musk turtle Sternotherus minor peltifer
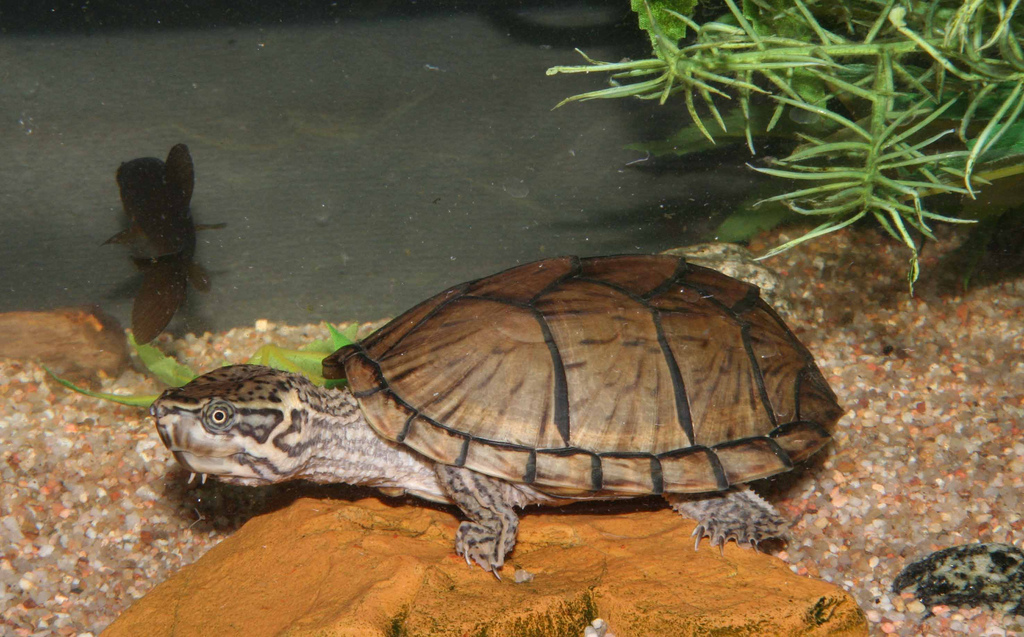
- Eastern musk turtle Sternotherus odoratus
Family: Emydidae
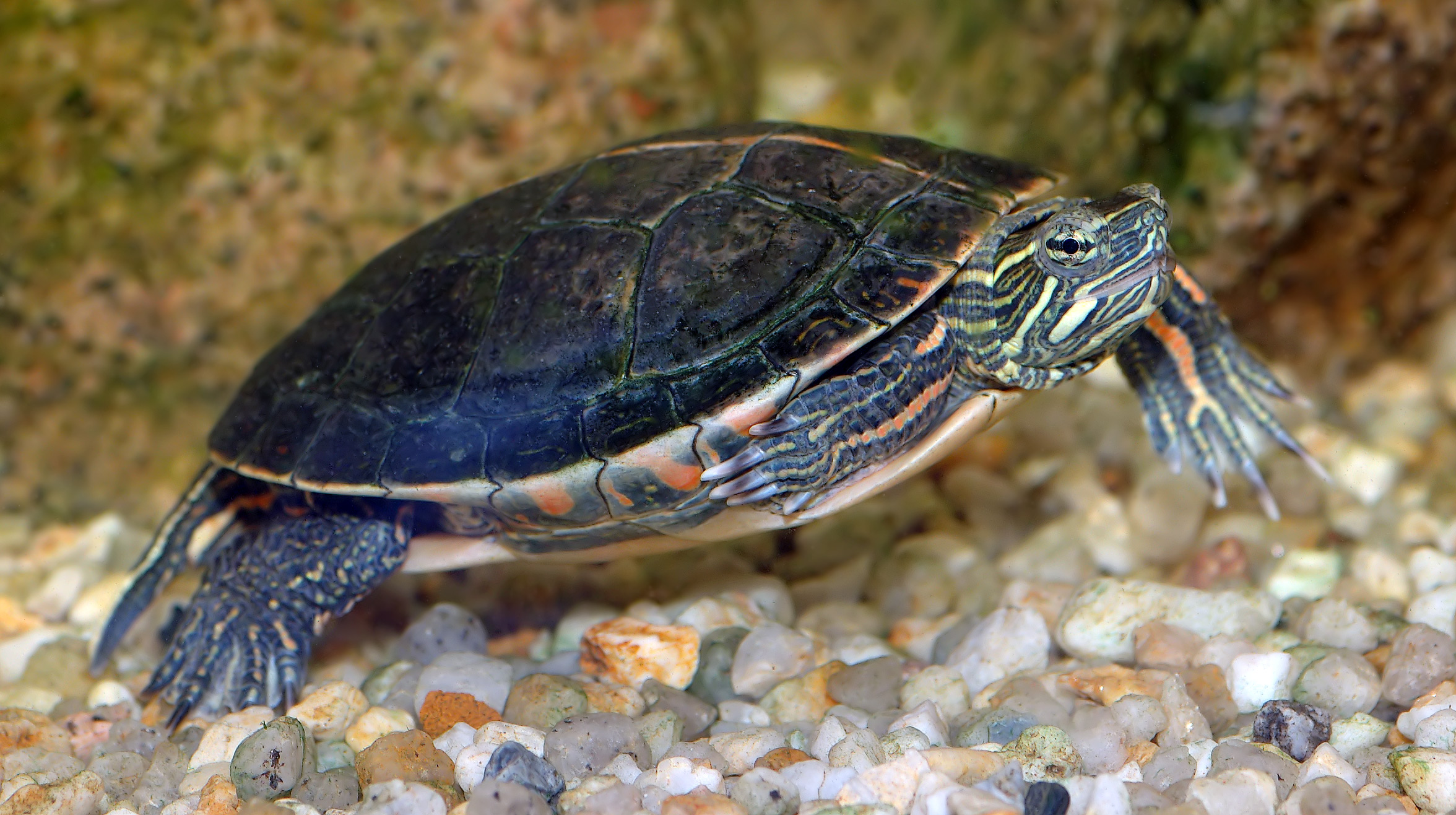
- Eastern painted turtle Chrysemys picta picta
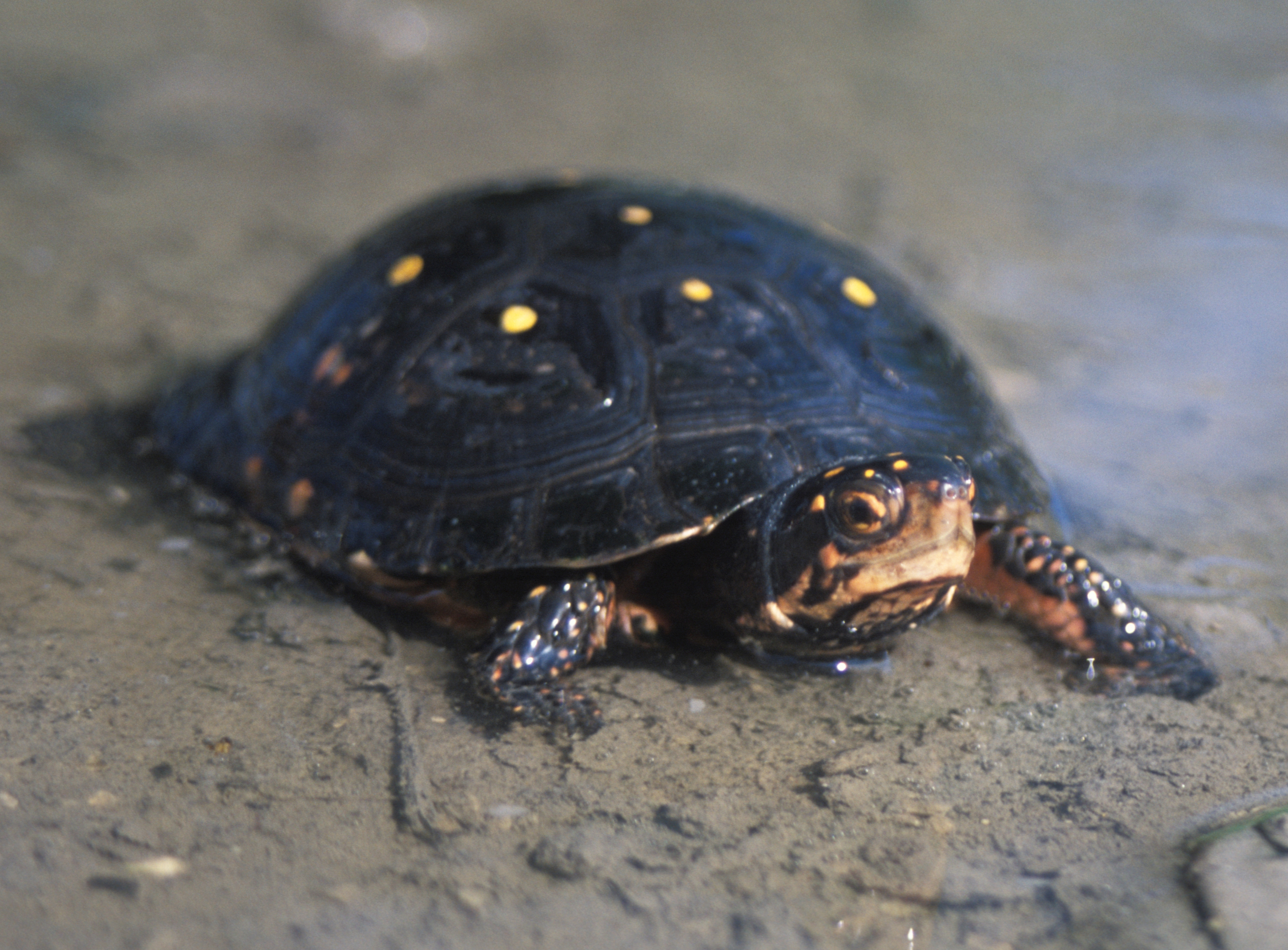
- Spotted turtle Clemmys guttata
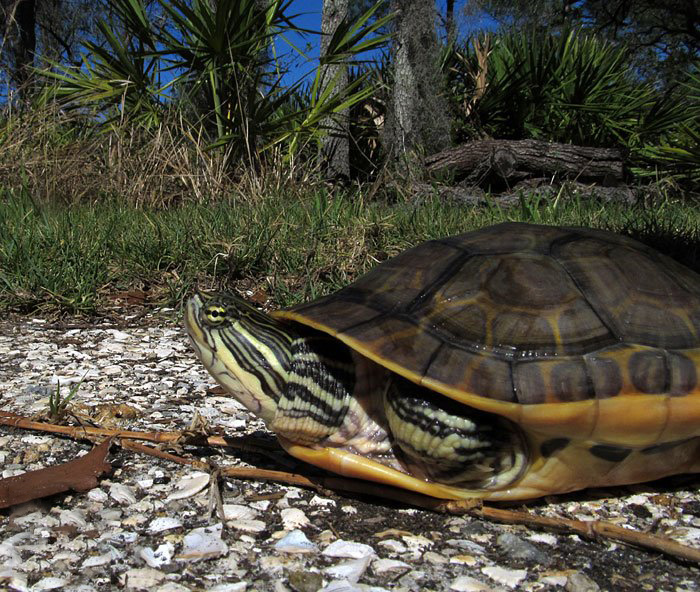
- Eastern chicken turtle Deirochelys reticularia reticularia.
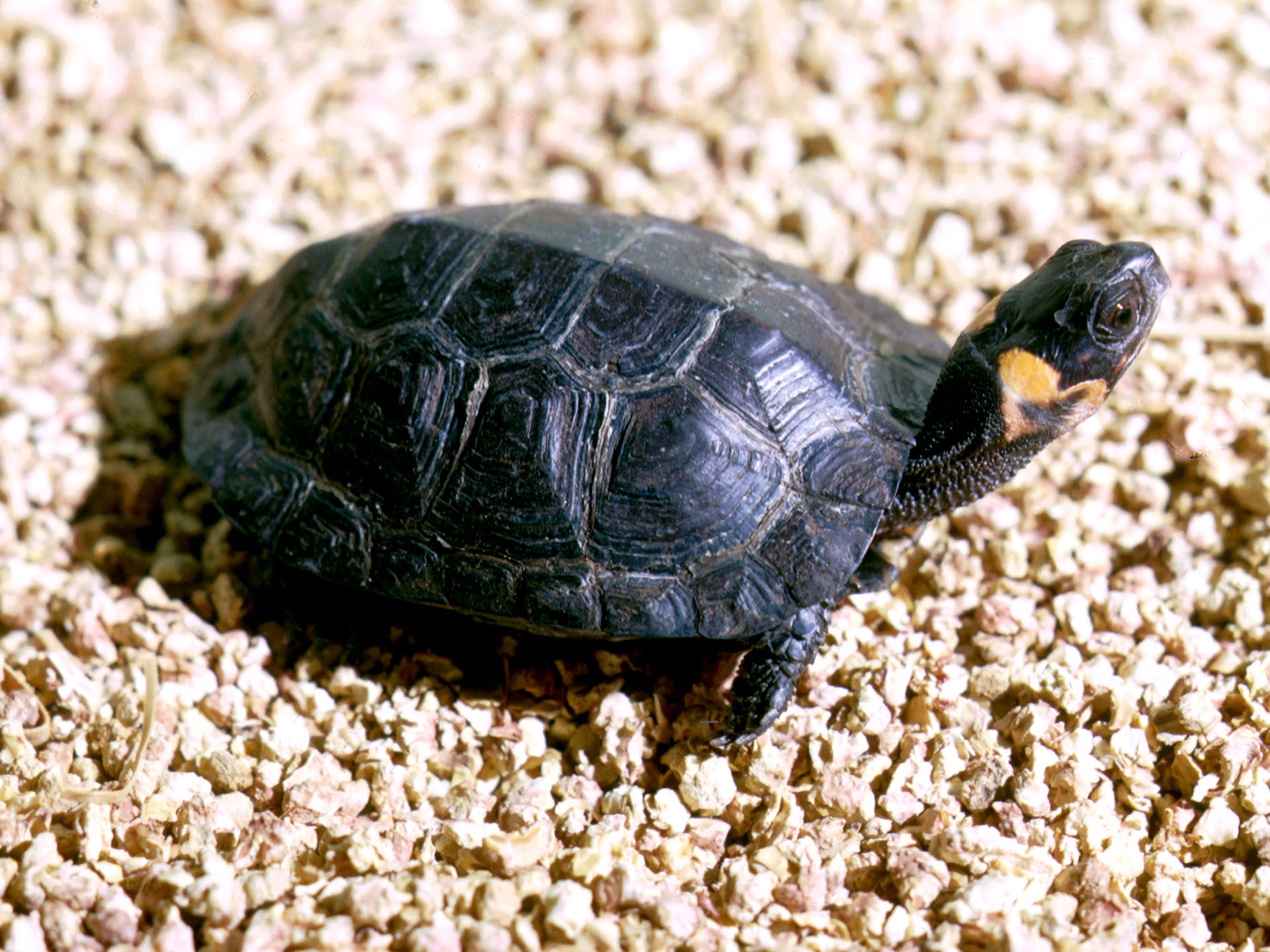
- Bog turtle Glyptemys muhlenbergii
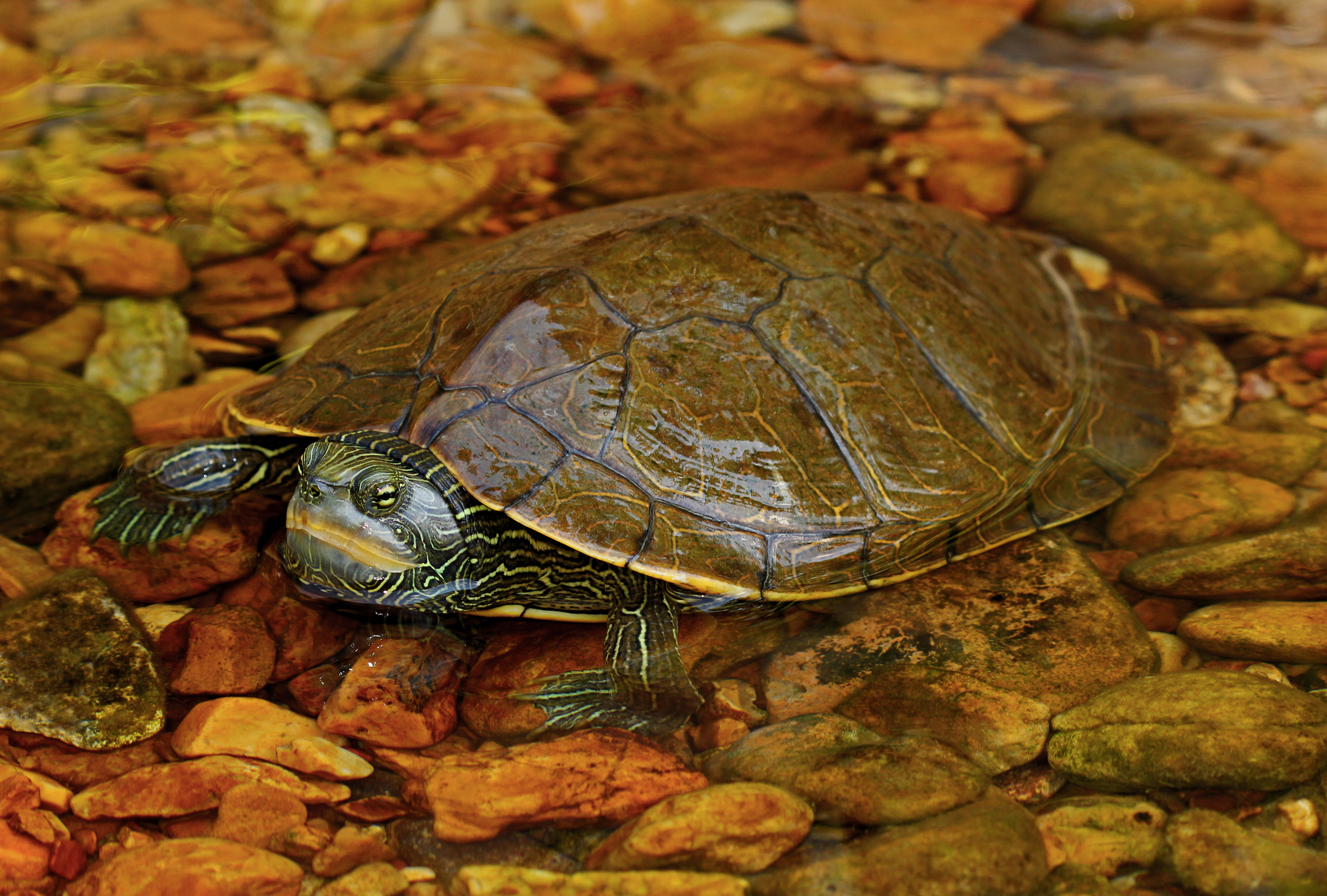
- Northern map turtle Graptemys geographica
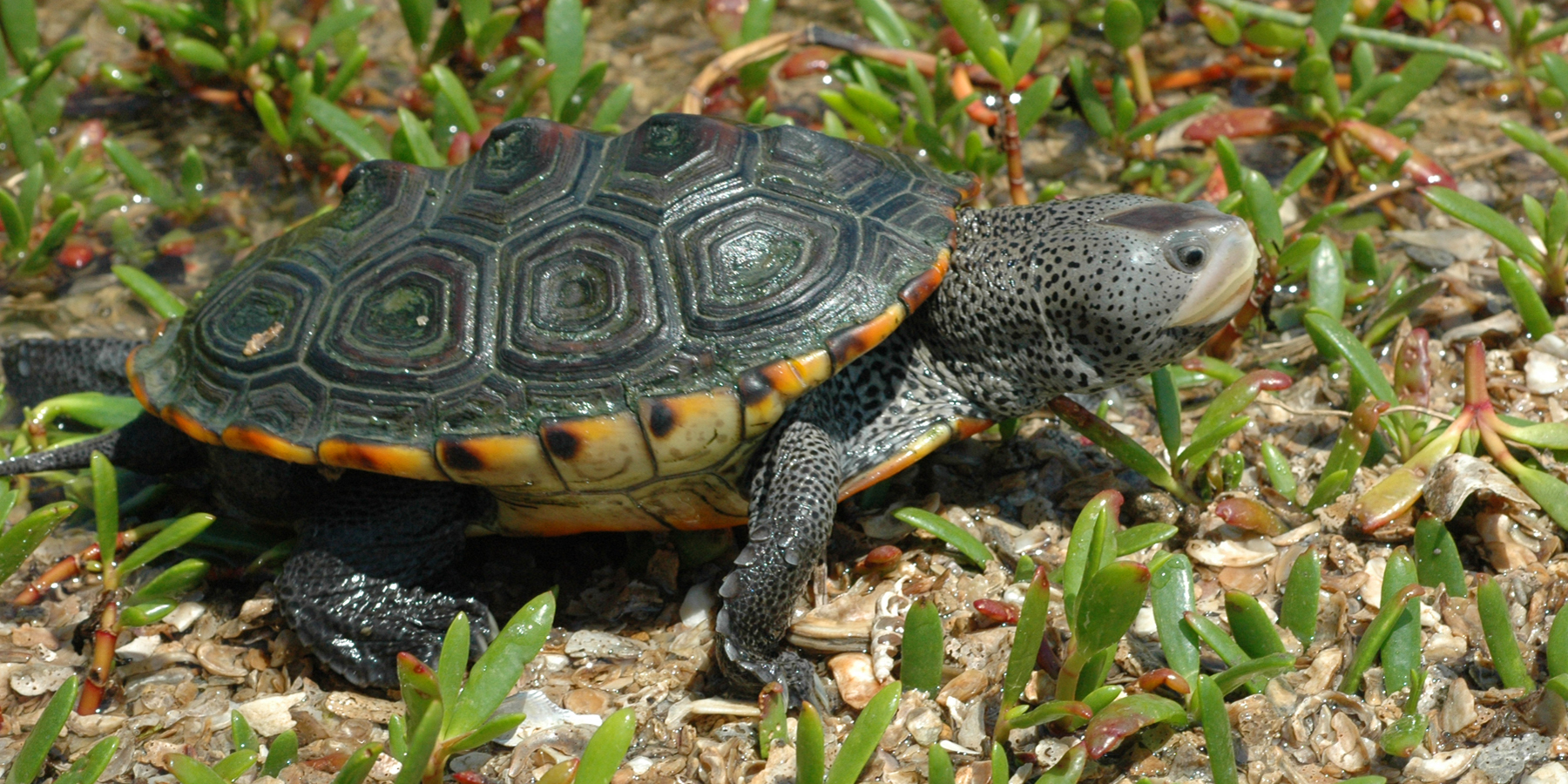
- Diamond-backed terrapin Malaclemys terrapin
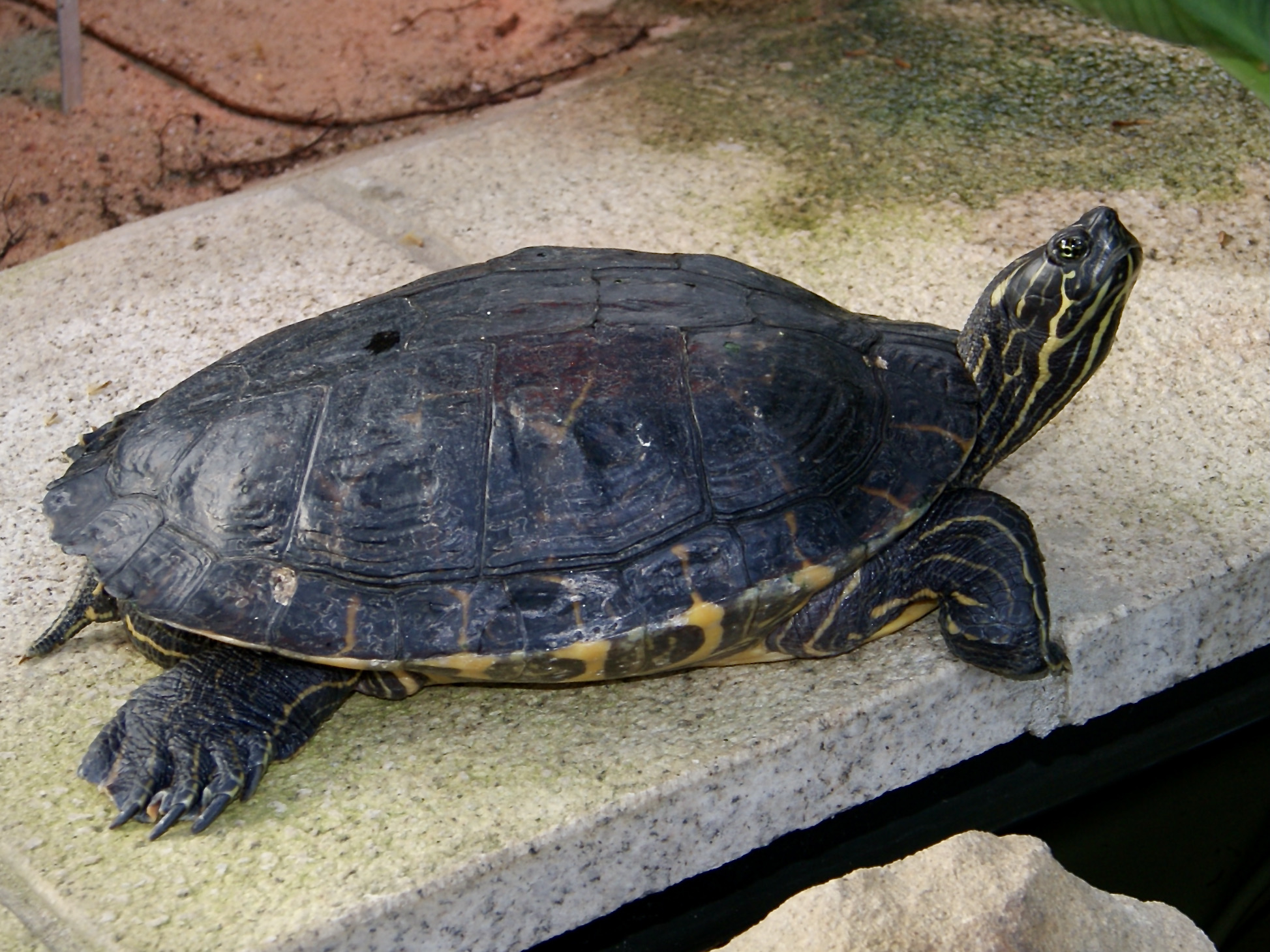
- Eastern river cooter Pseudemys concinna concinna
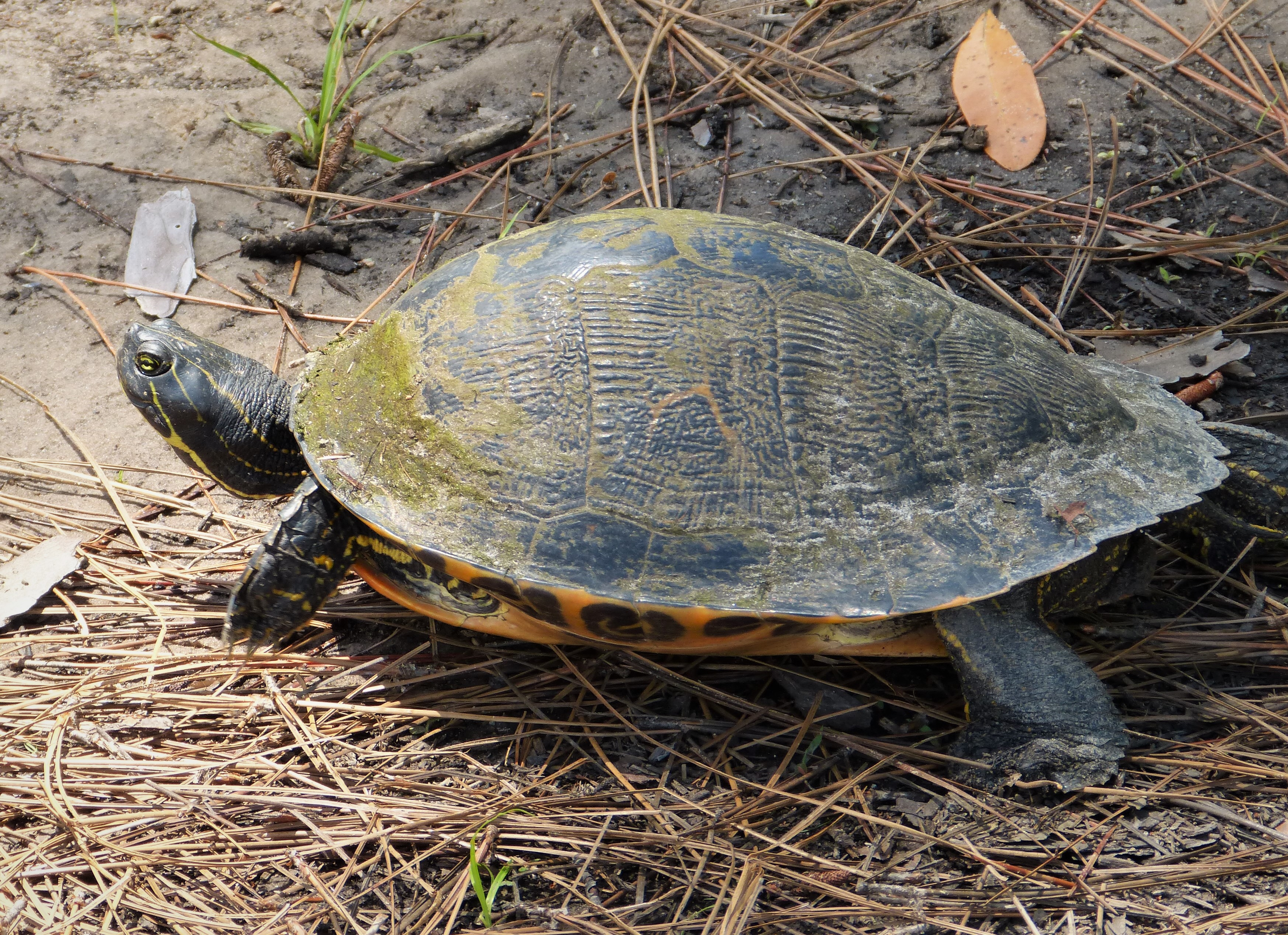
- Coastal plain cooter Pseudemys floridana
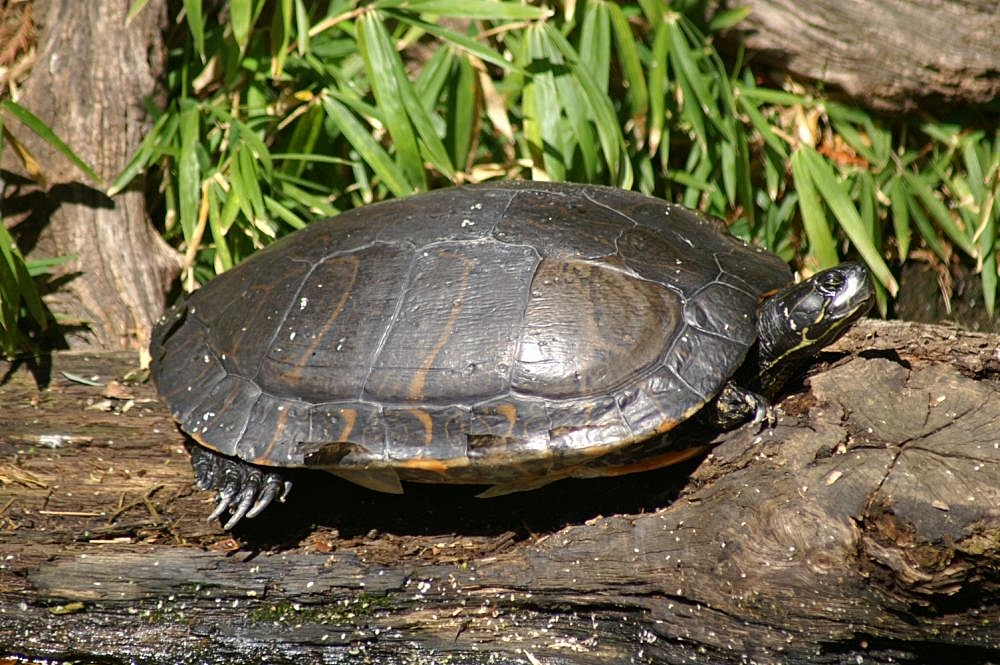
- Northern red-bellied cooter Pseudemys rubriventris
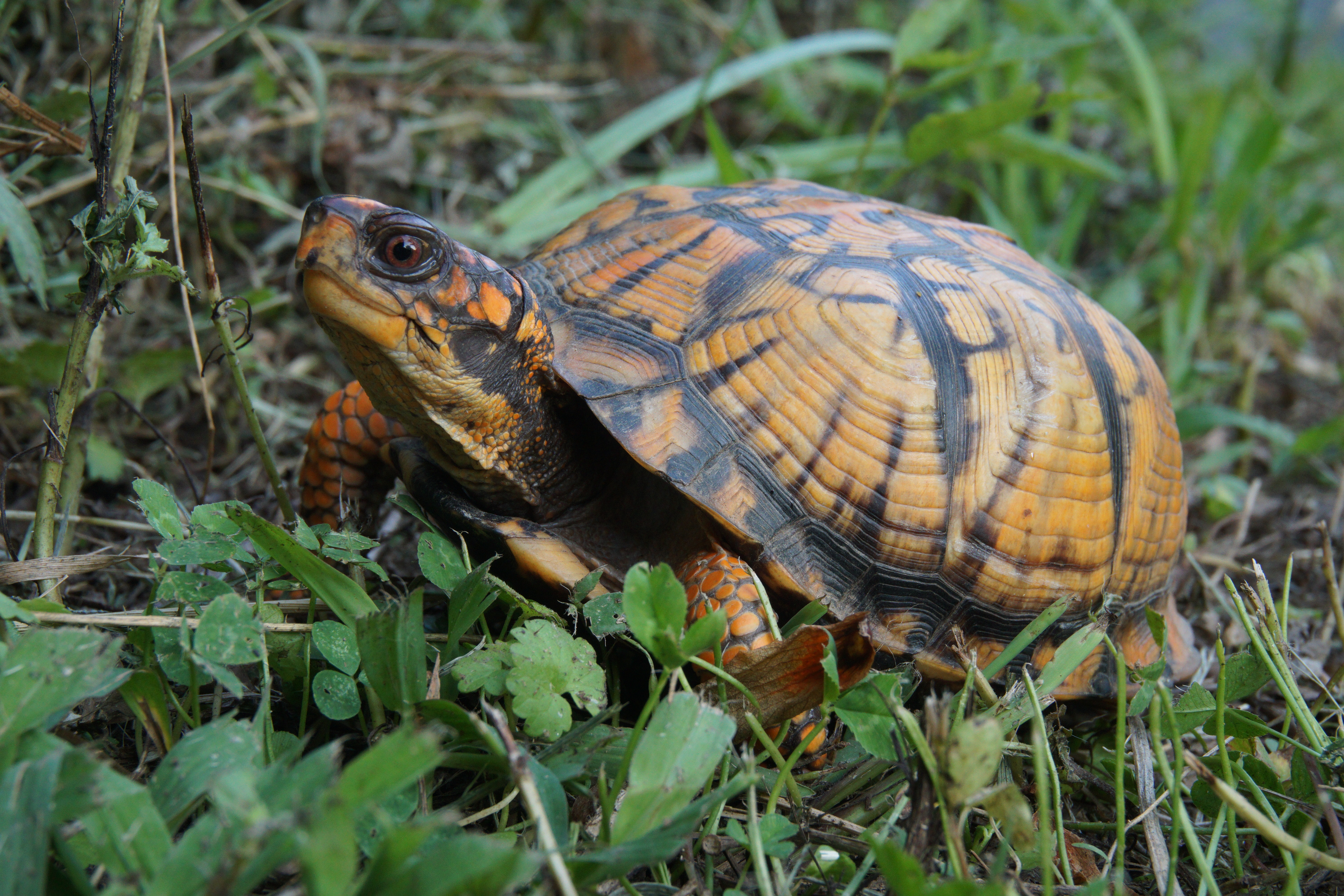
- Woodland box turtle Terrapene carolina carolina
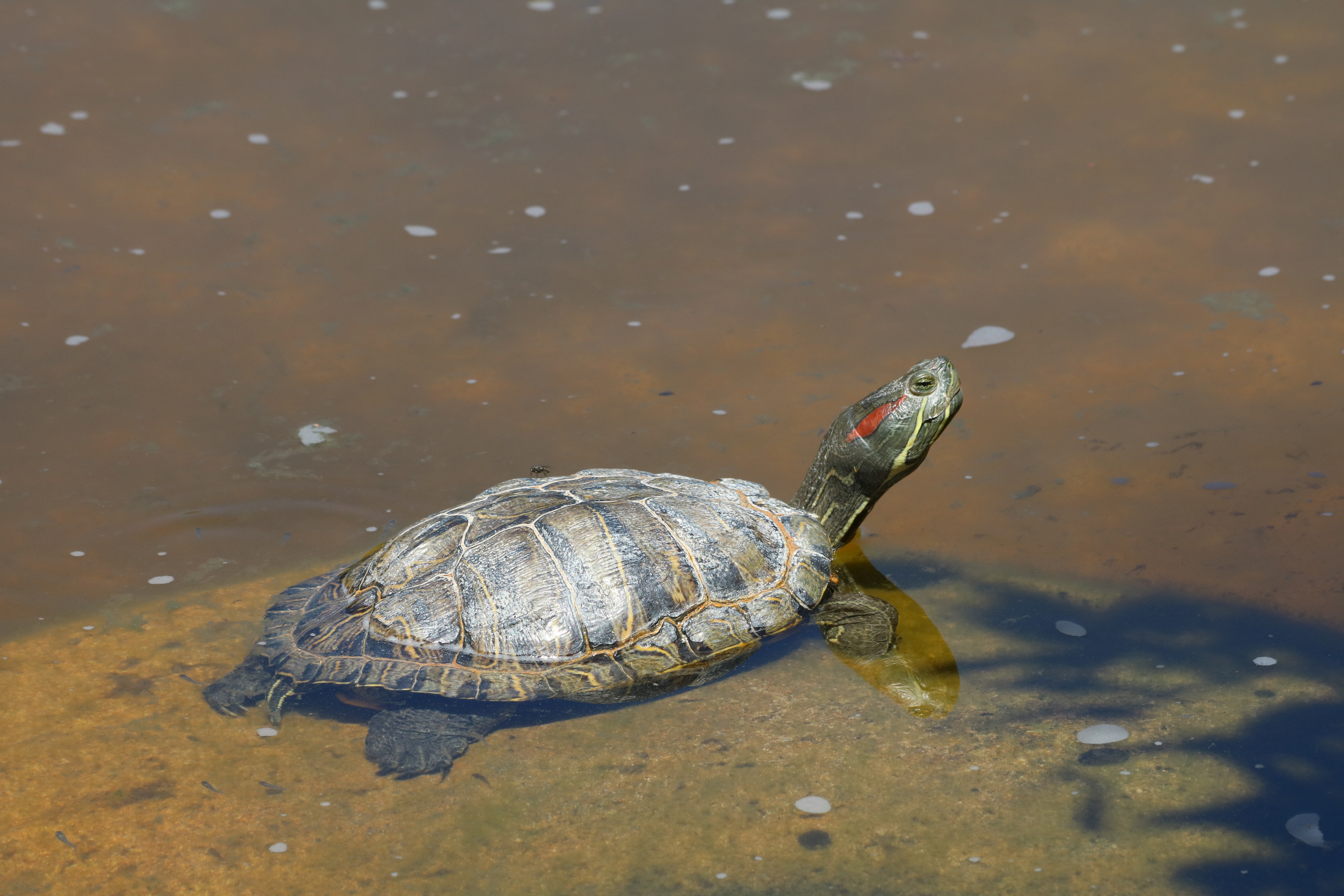
- Red-eared slider Trachemys scripta elegans (I)
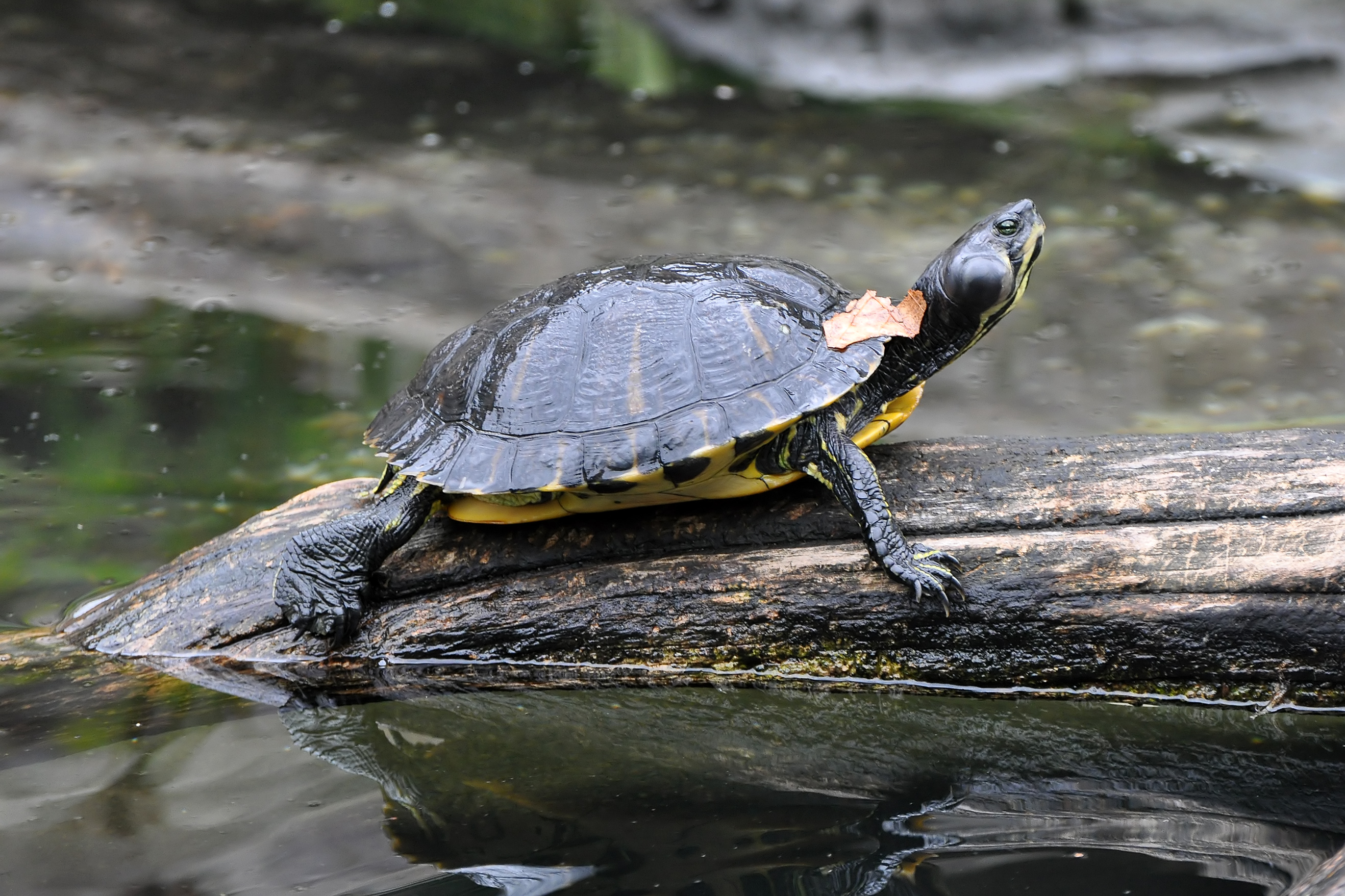
- Yellow-bellied slider Trachemys scripta scripta
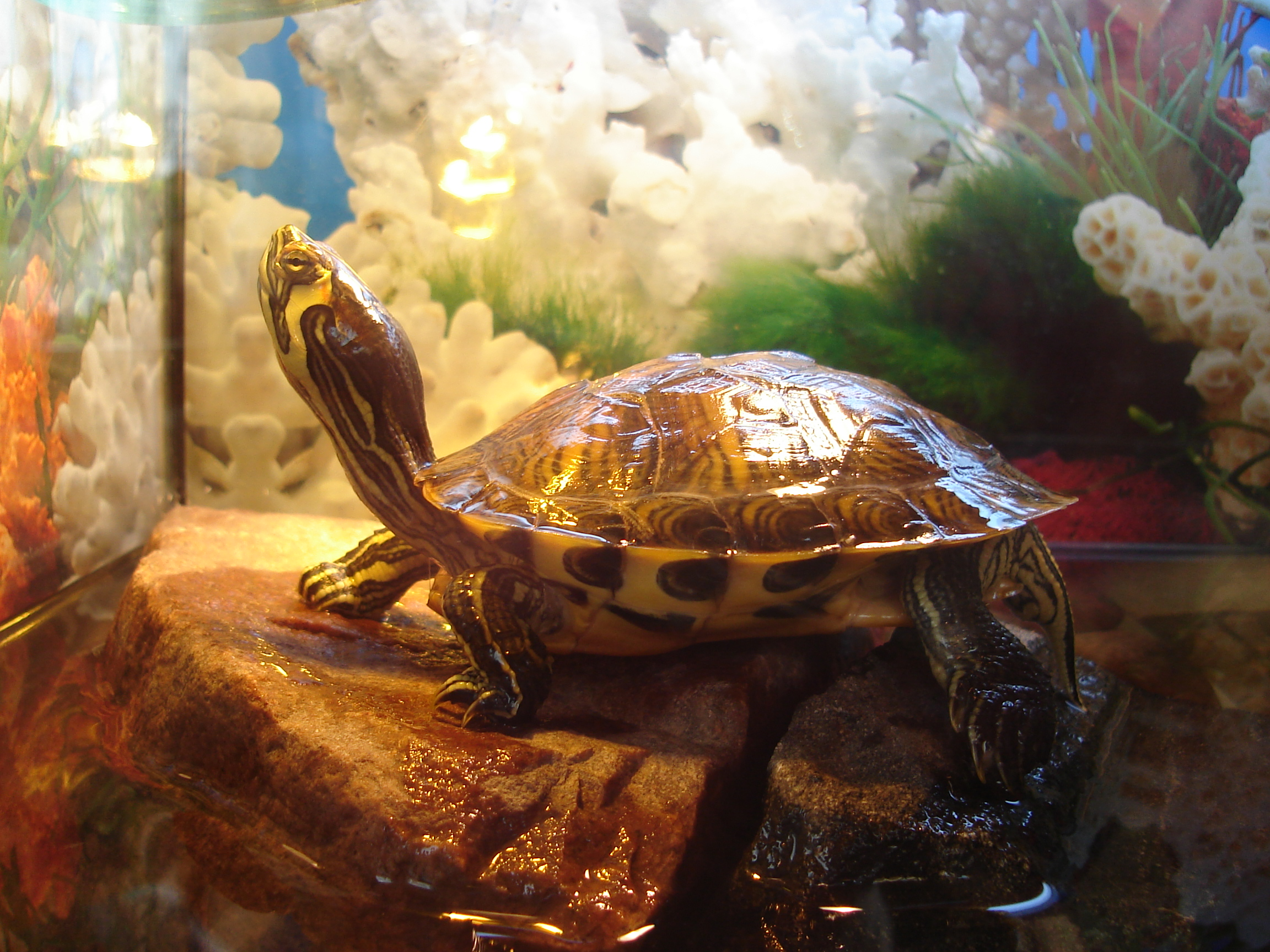
- Cumberland slider Trachemys scripta troostii
Family: Dermochelyidae
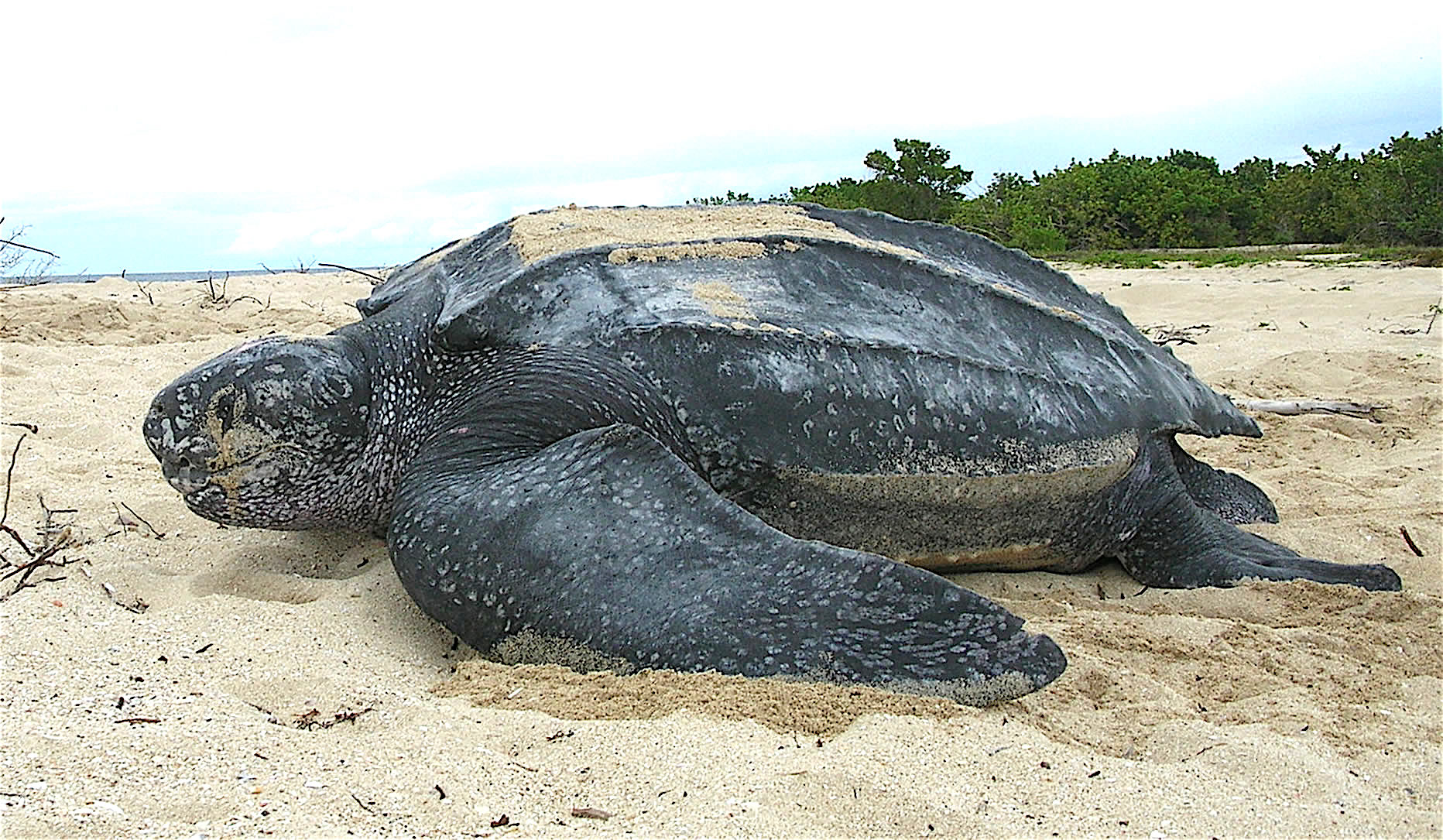
- Leatherback sea turtle Dermochelys coriacea
Family: Cheloniidae
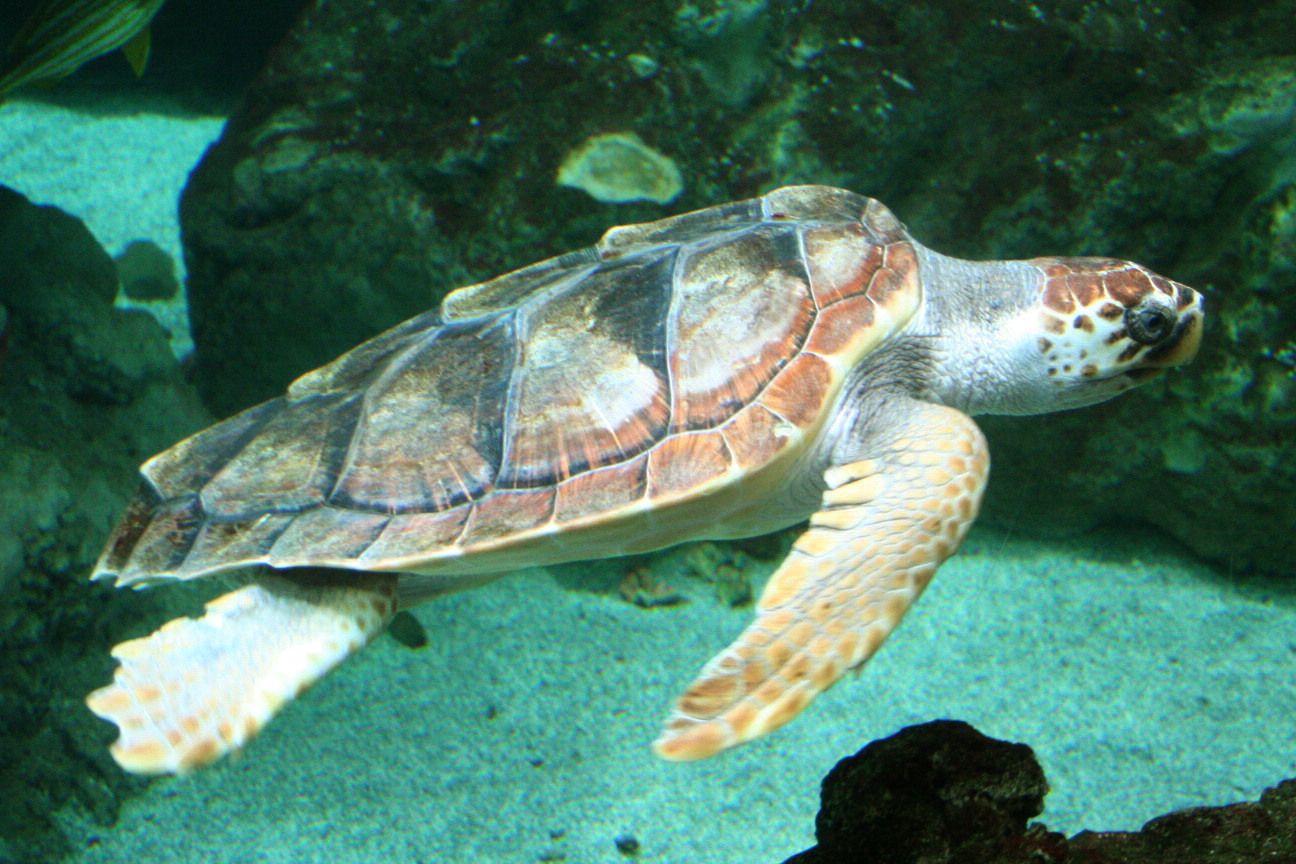
- Loggerhead sea turtle Caretta caretta
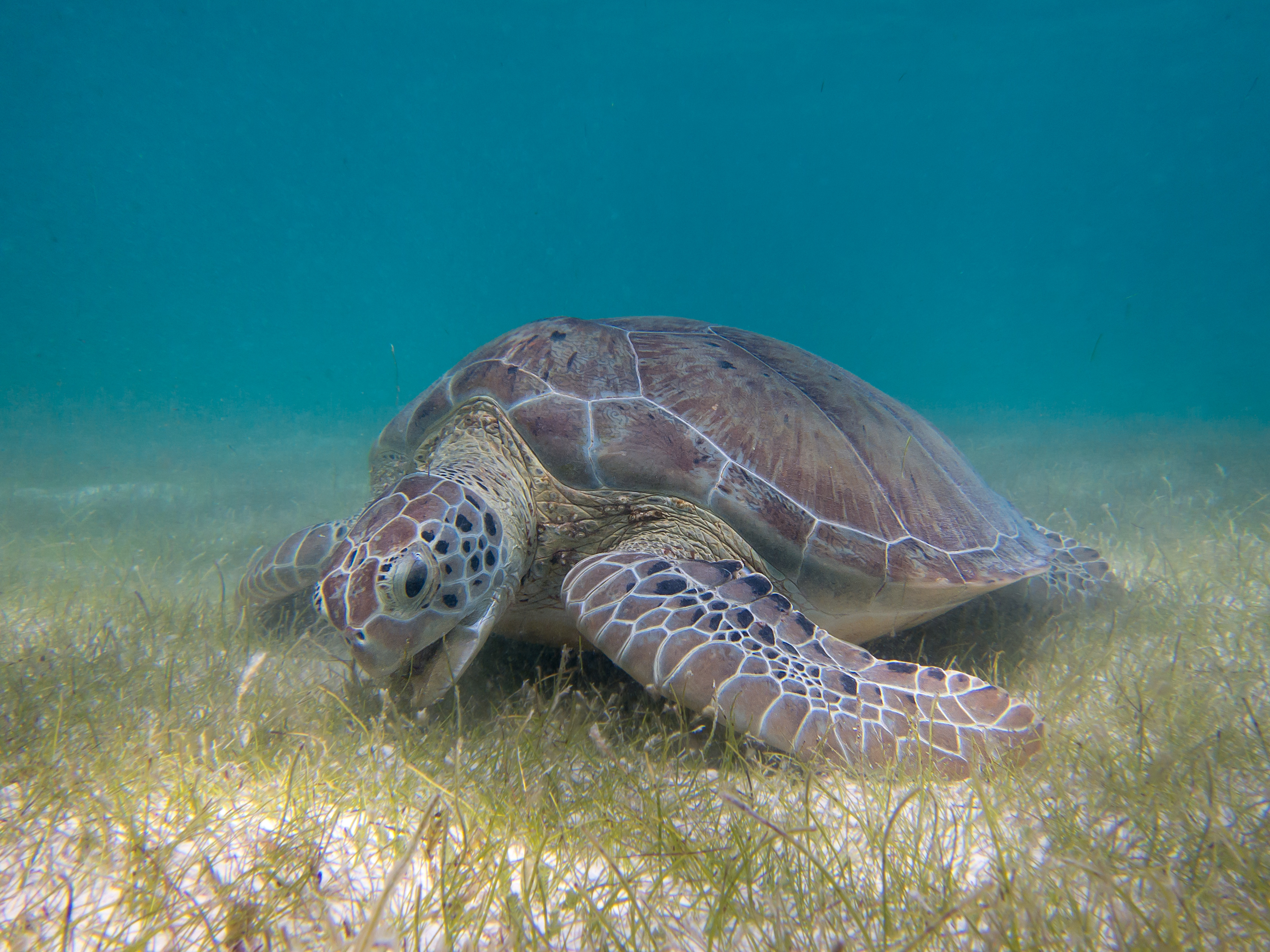
- Green sea turtle Chelonia mydas
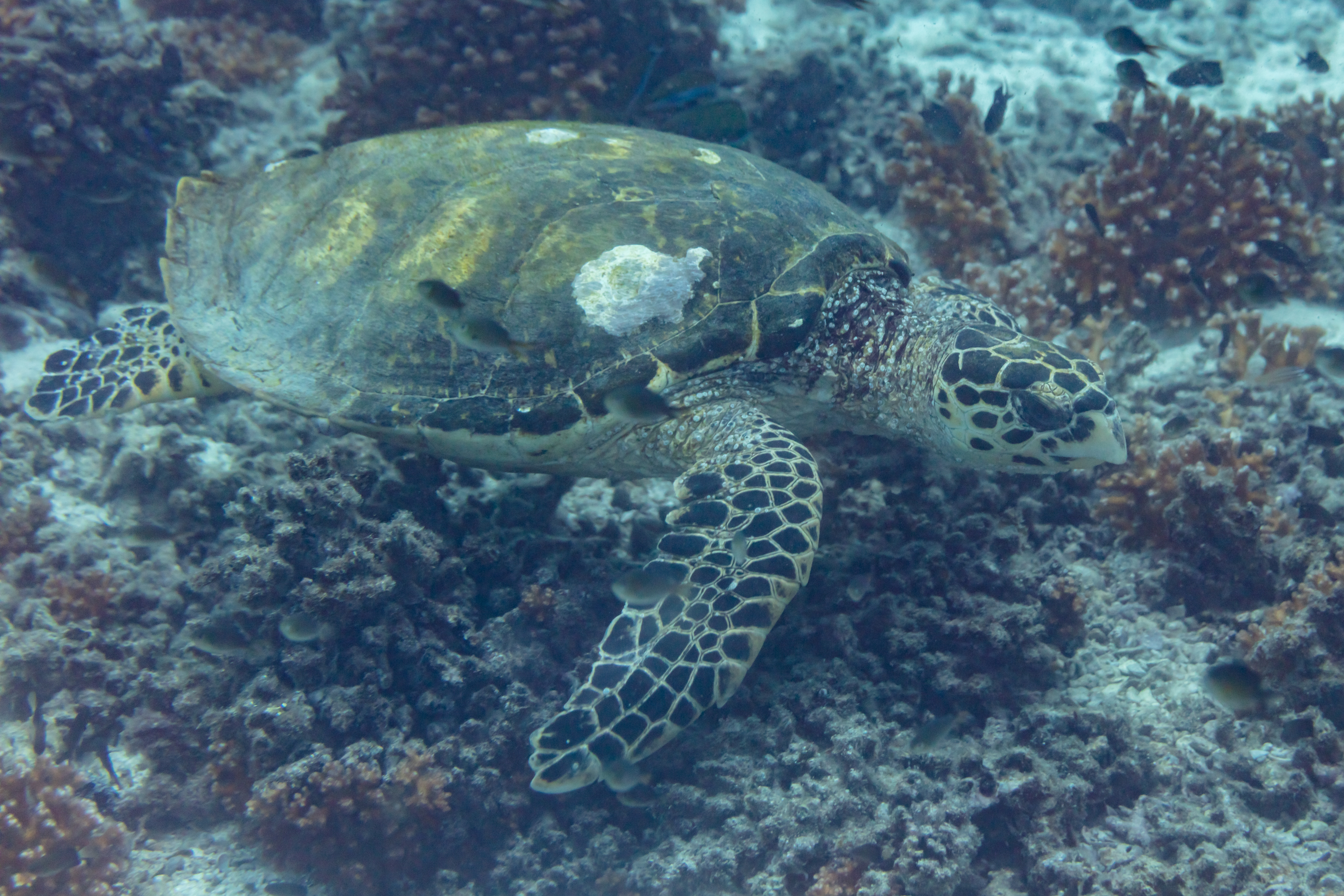
- Atlantic hawksbill sea turtle Eretmochelys imbricata imbricata
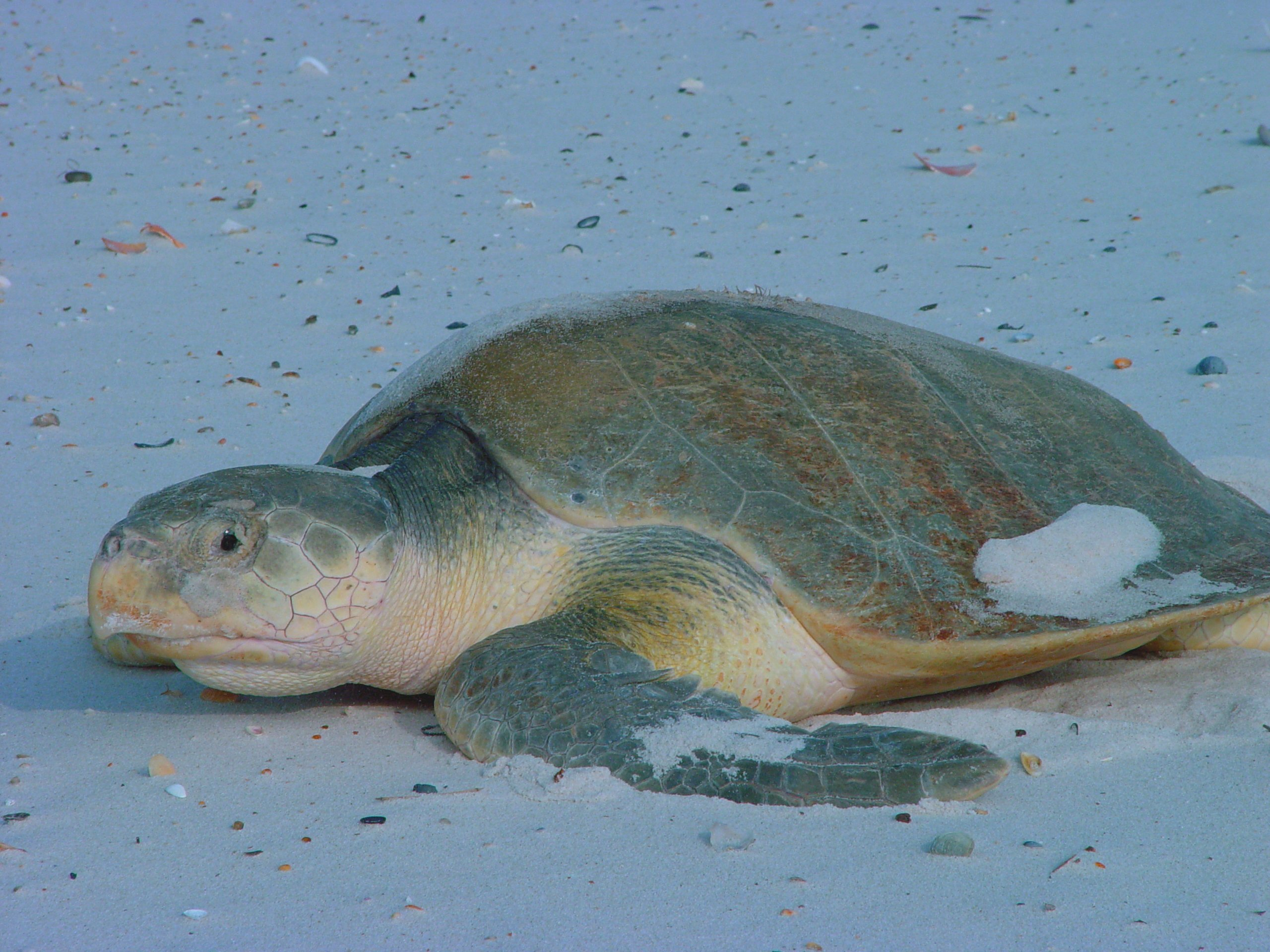
- Kemp's ridley sea turtle Lepidochelys kempii
Family: Trionychidae
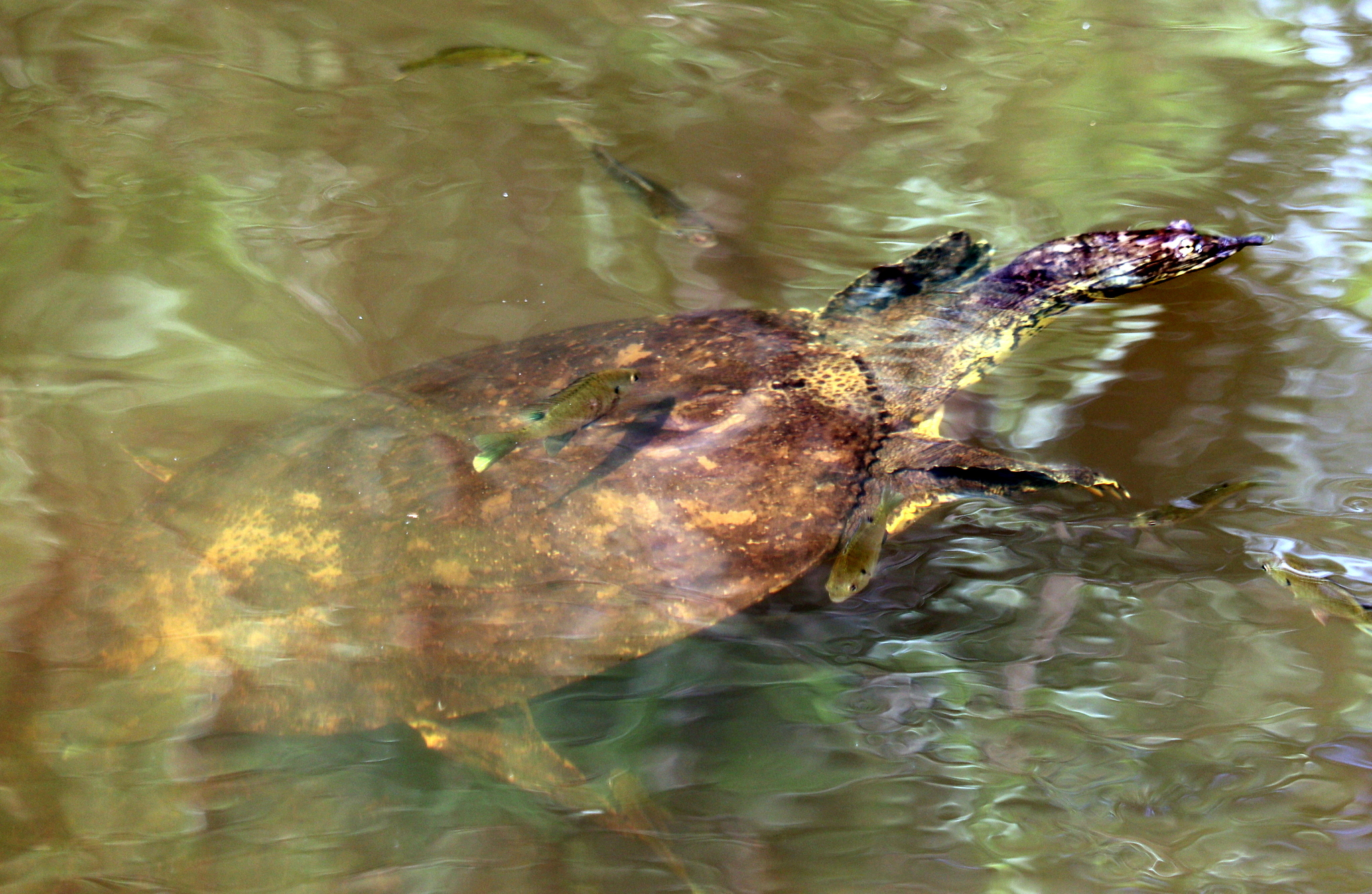
- Gulf Coast spiny softshell Apalone spinifera aspera
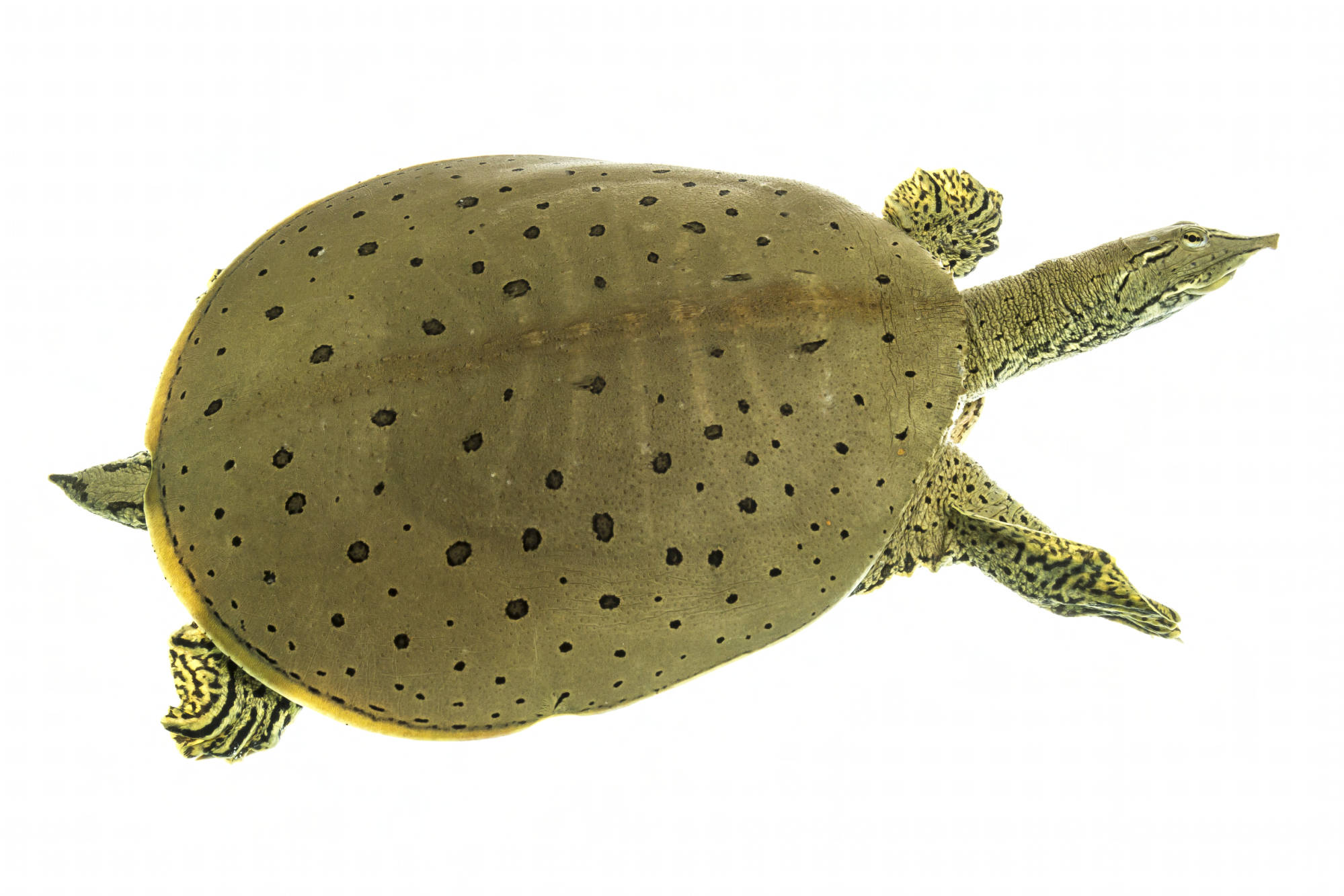
- Eastern spiny softshell Apalone spinifera spinifera

== Lizards ==
Order: Squamata

Suborder: Gekkota

Family: Gekkonidae
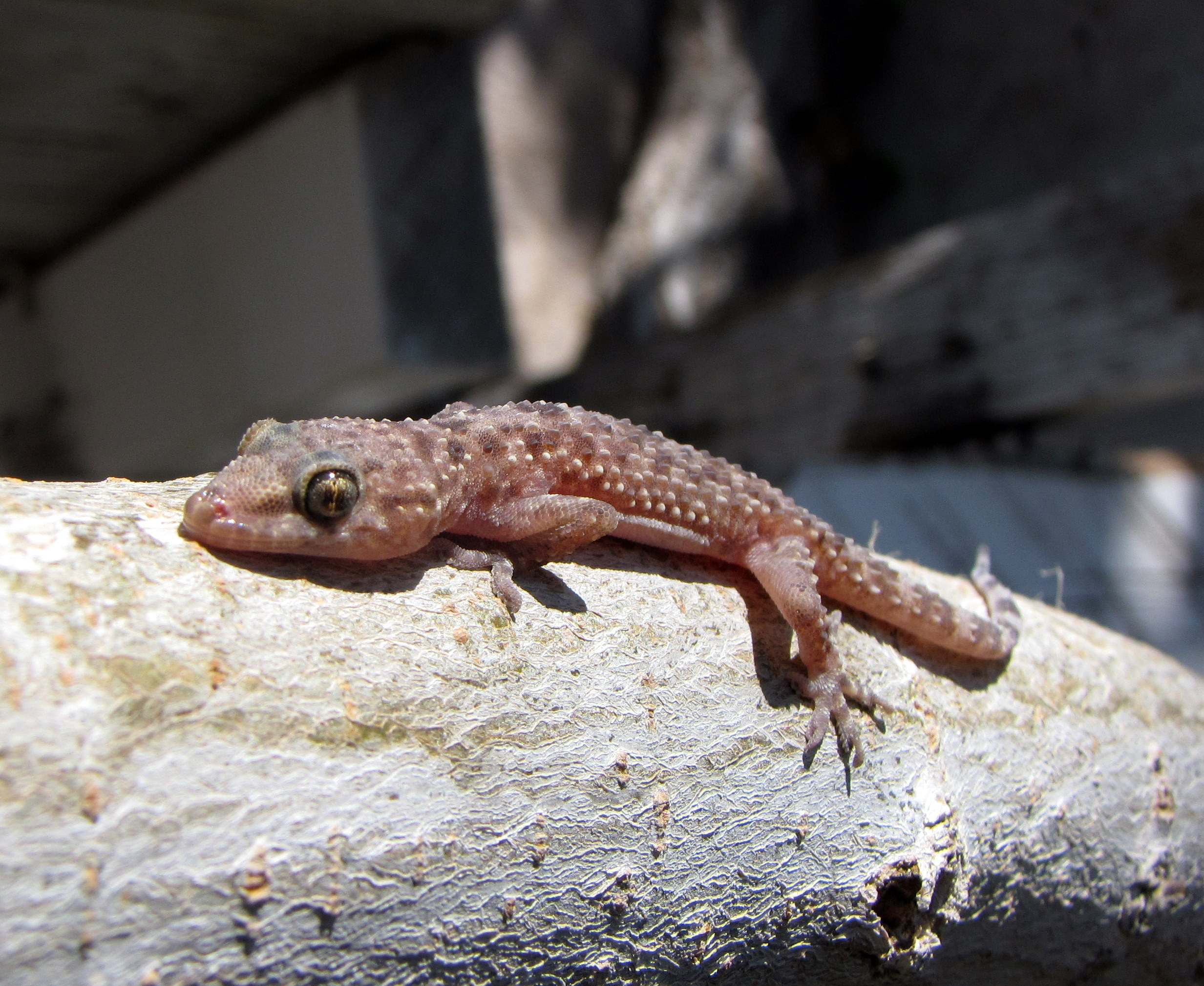
- Mediterranean gecko Hemidactylus turcicus (I)

Suborder: Iguania

Family: Iguanidae
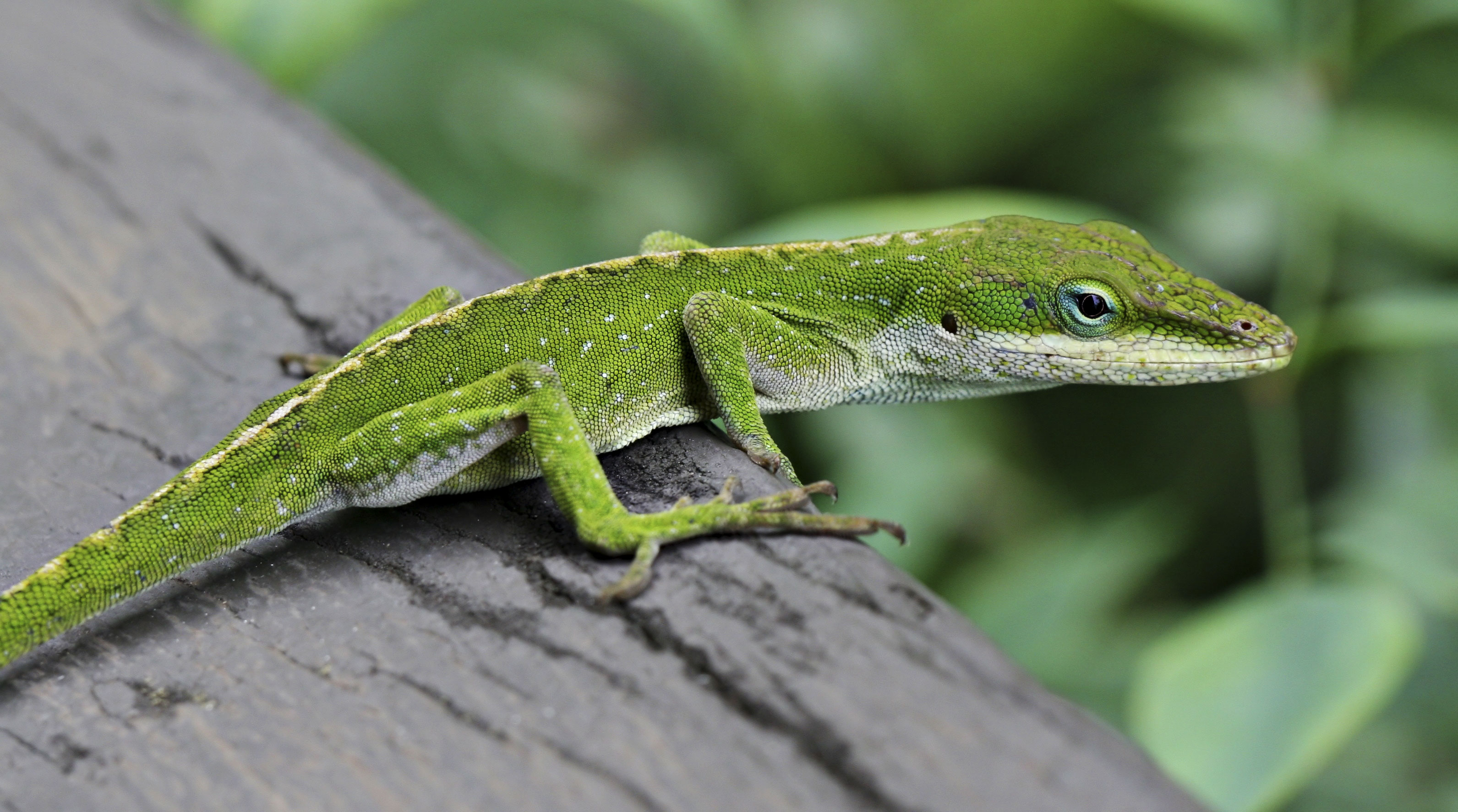
- Green anole Anolis carolinensis
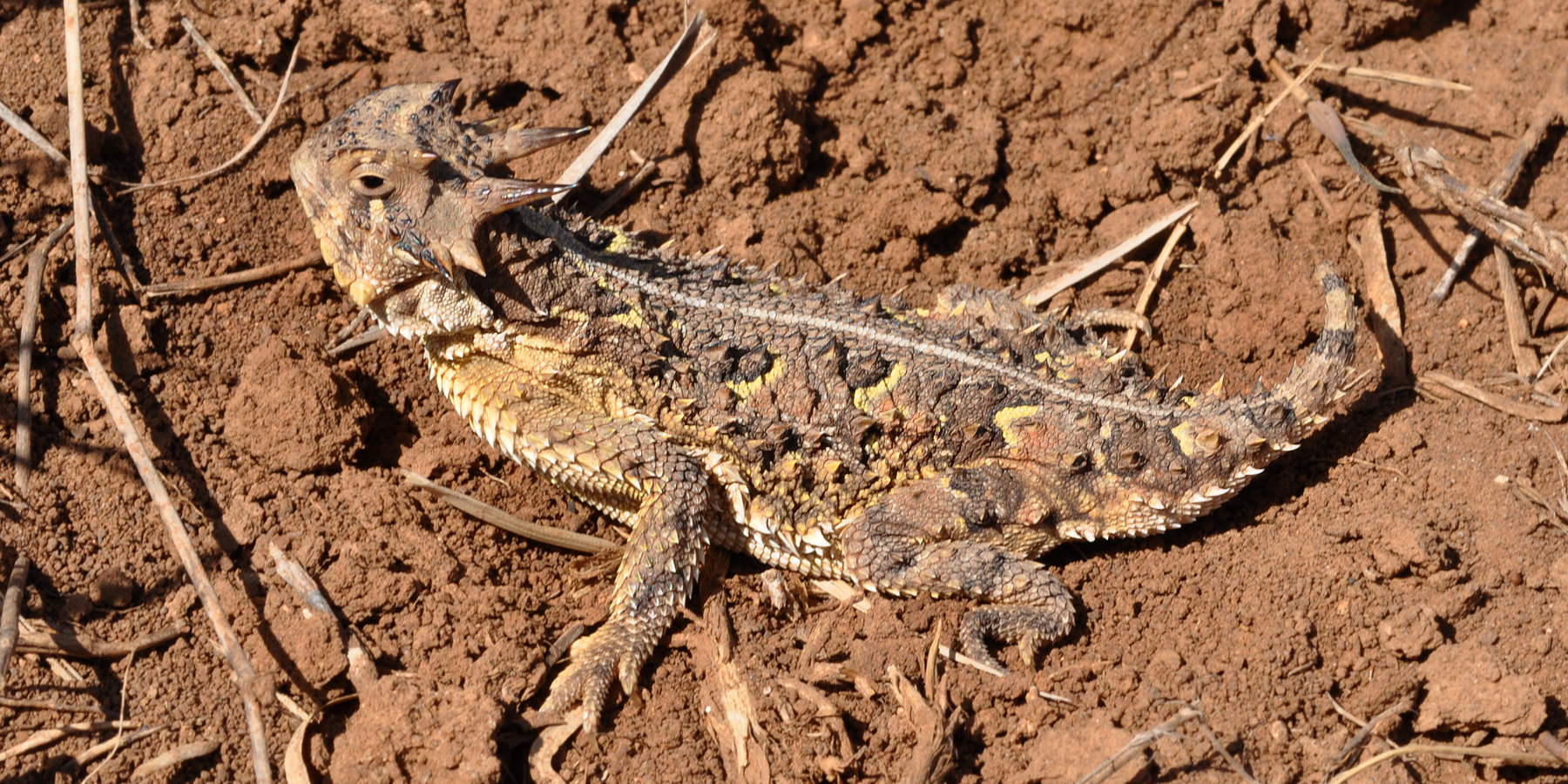
- Texas horned lizard Phrynosoma cornutum (I)
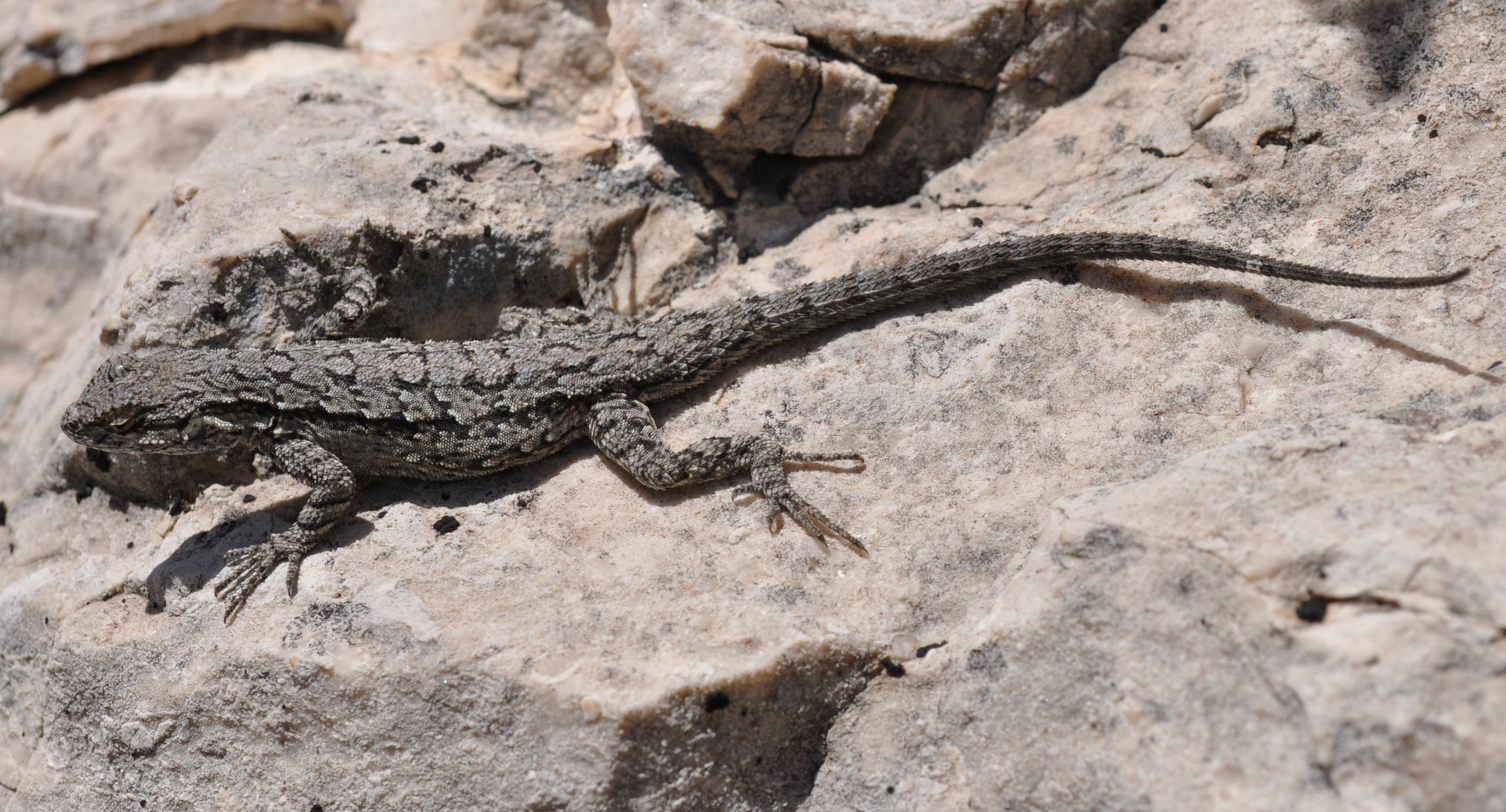
- Eastern fence lizard Sceloporus undulatus

Suborder: Autarchoglossa

Family: Teiidae
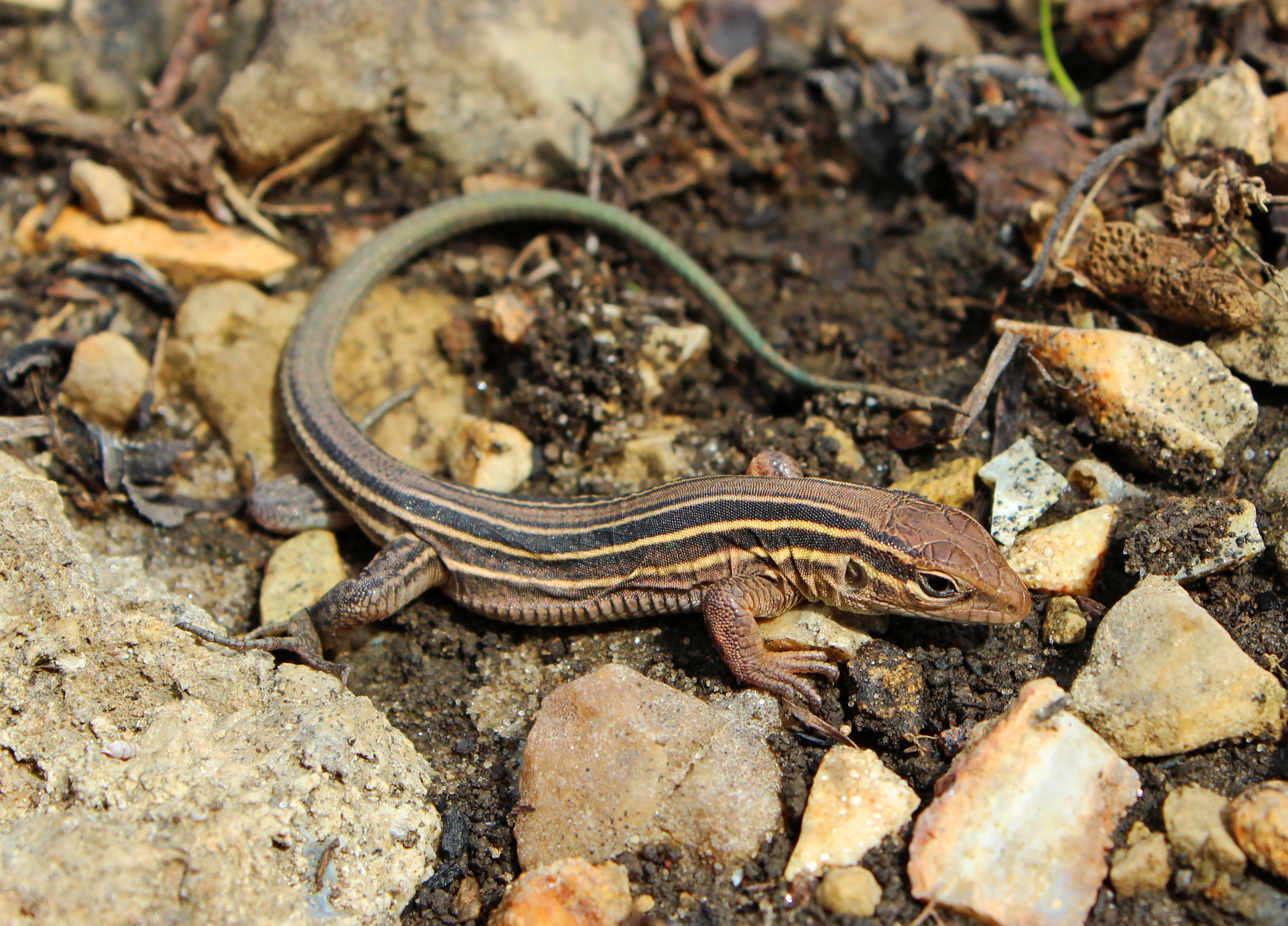
- Eastern six-lined racerunner Aspidoscelis sexlineata sexlineata
Family: Scincidae
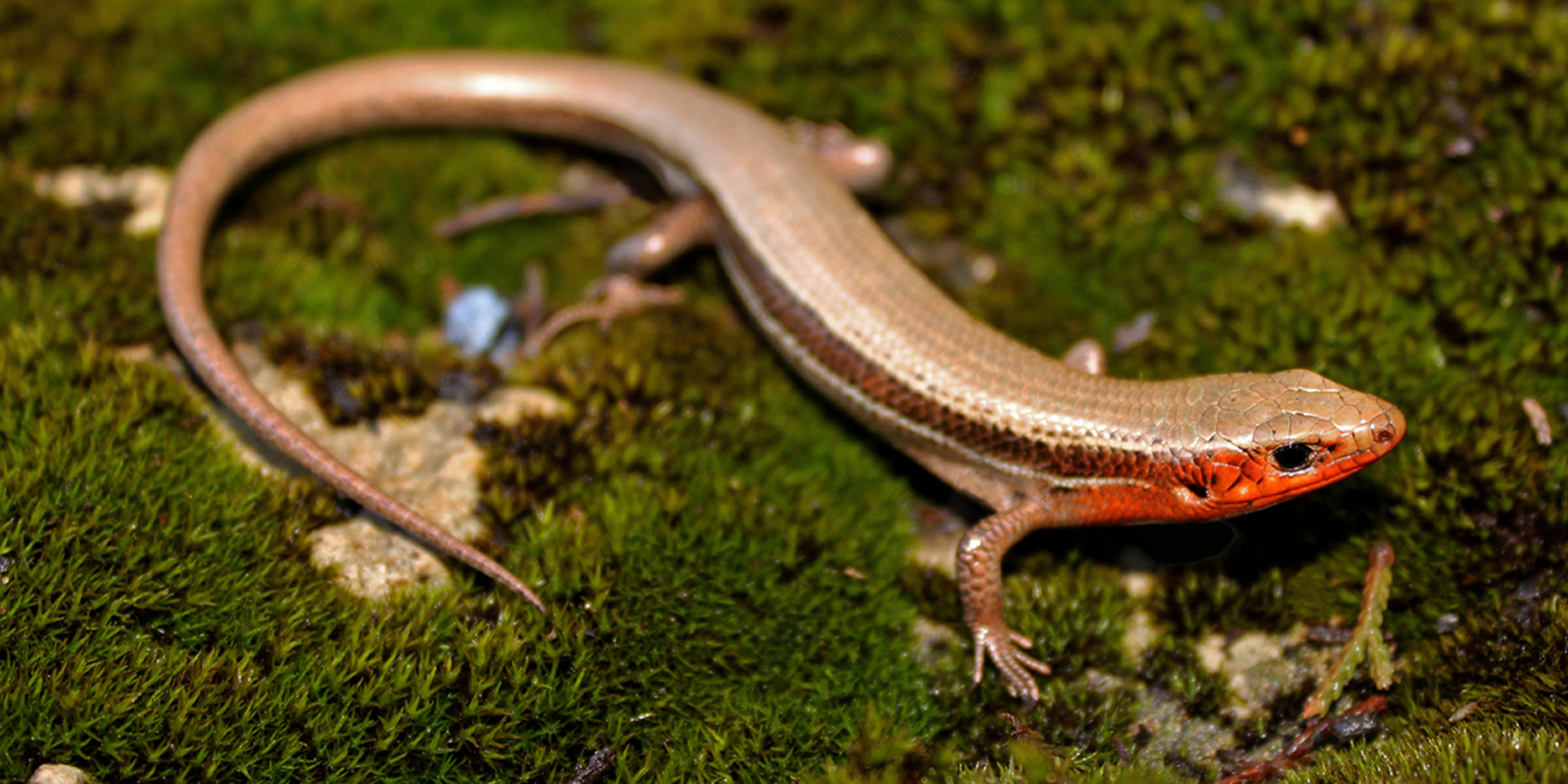
- Coal skink Plestiodon anthracinus
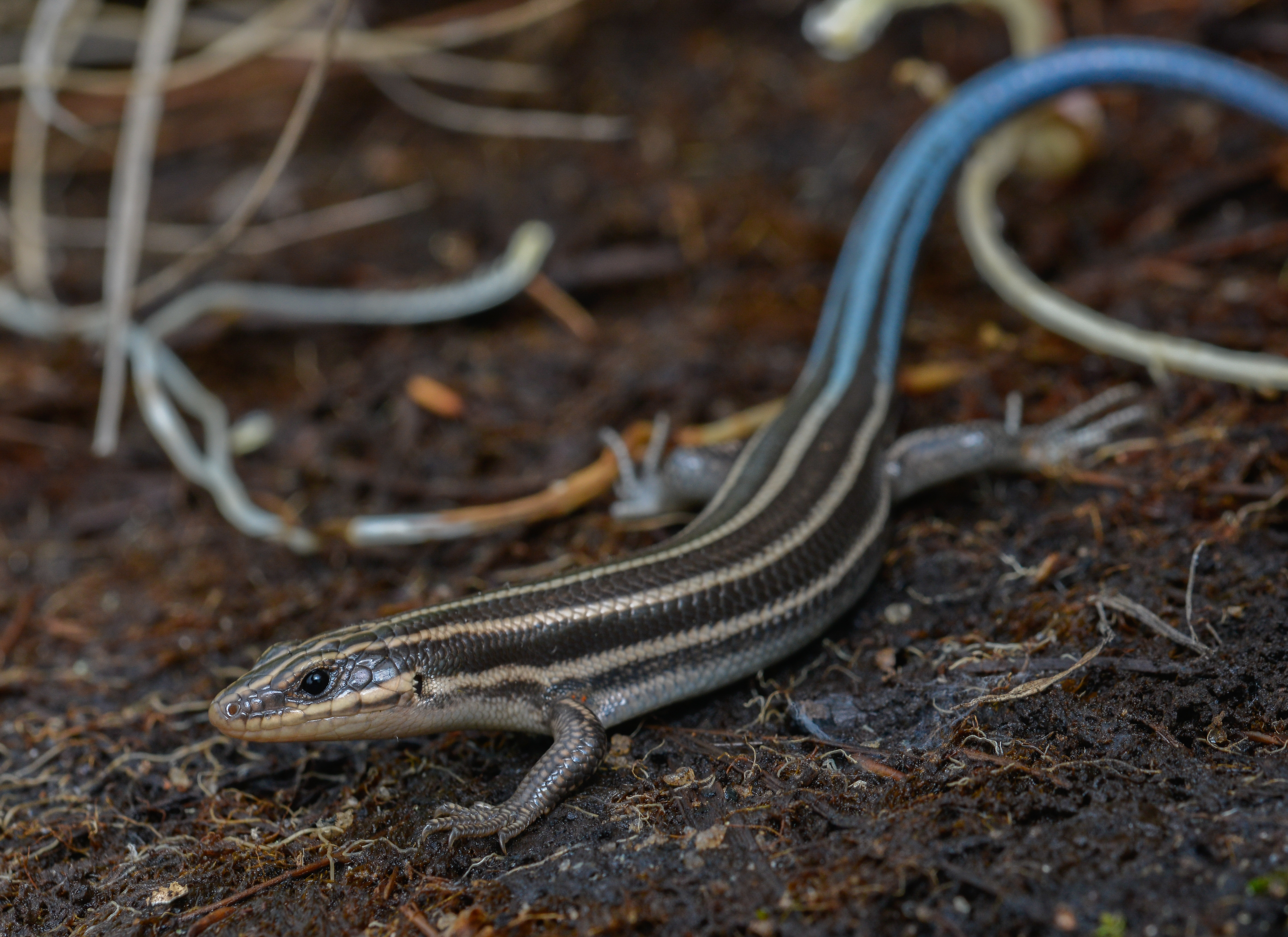
- Common five-lined skink Plestiodon fasciatus
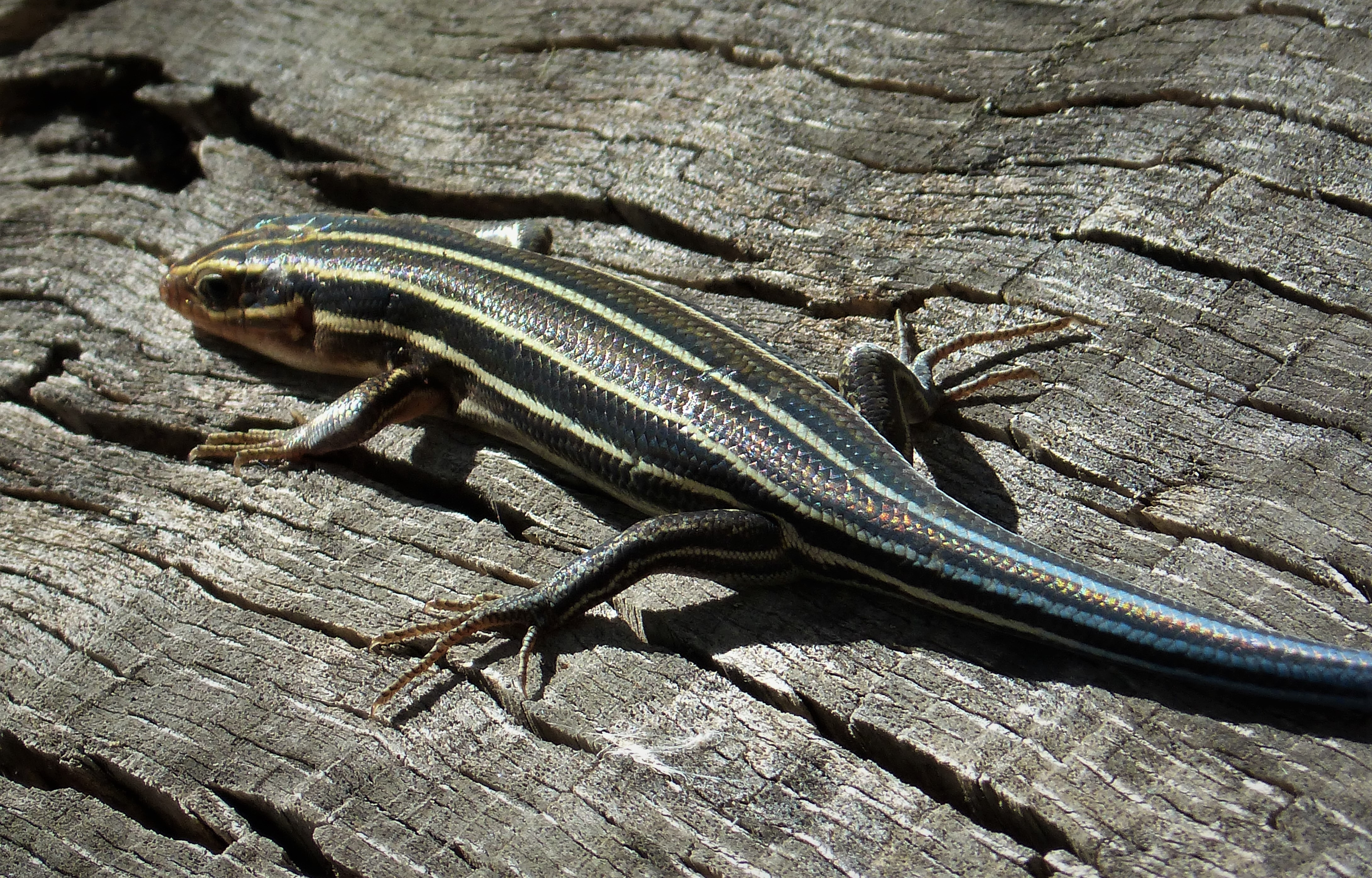
- Southeastern five-lined skink Plestiodon inexpectatus
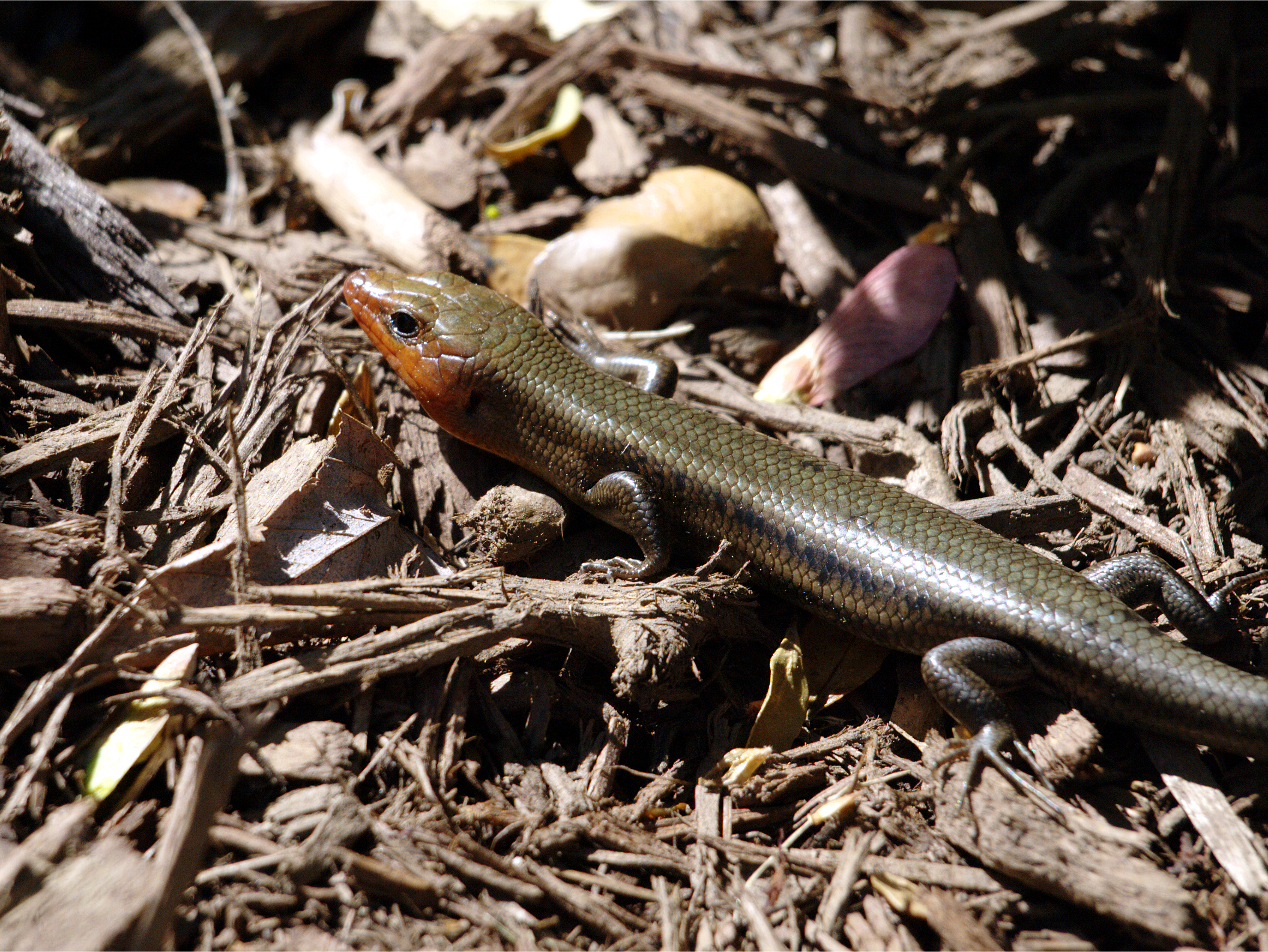
- Broad-headed skink Plestiodon laticeps
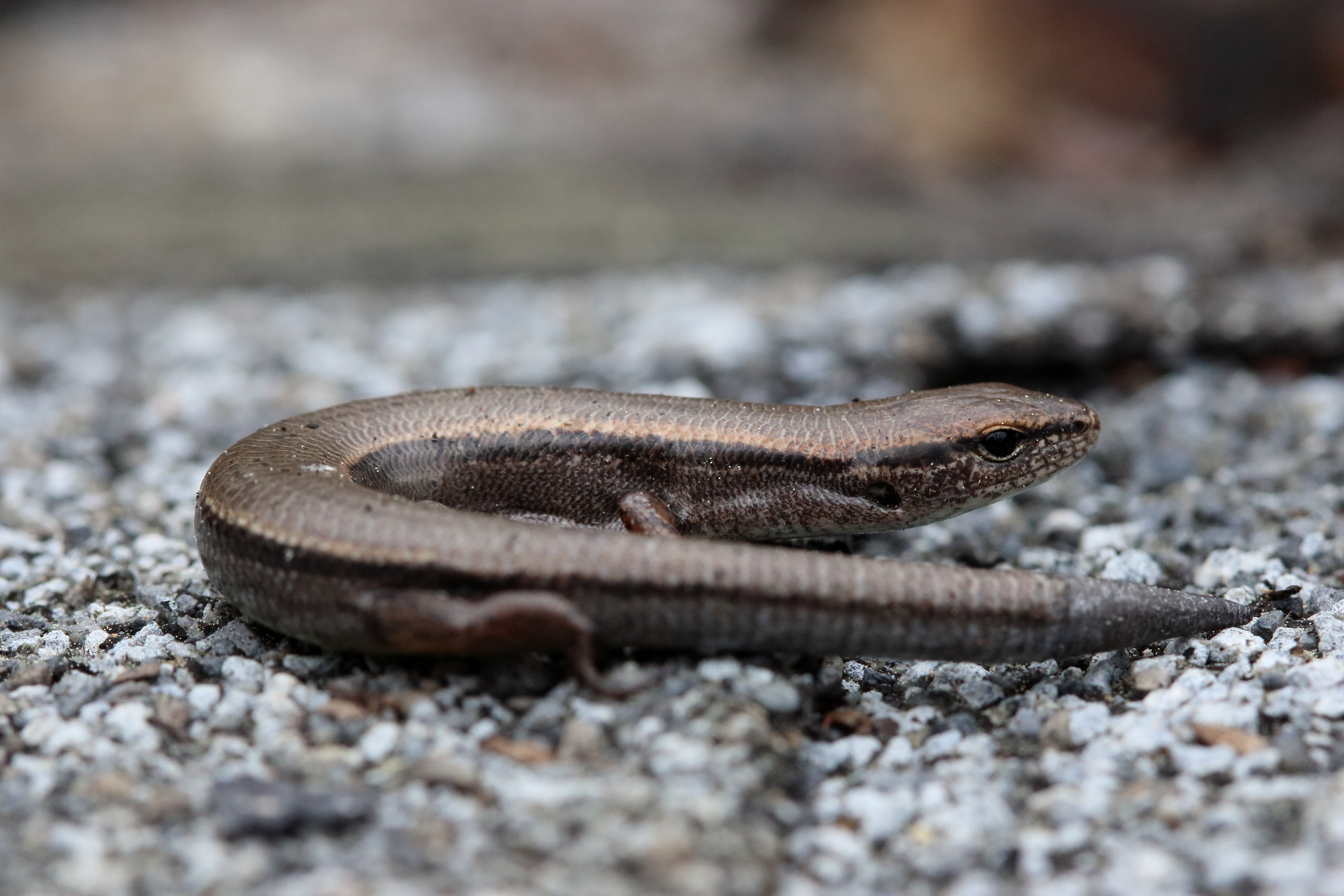
- Little brown skink Scincella lateralis
Family: Anguidae
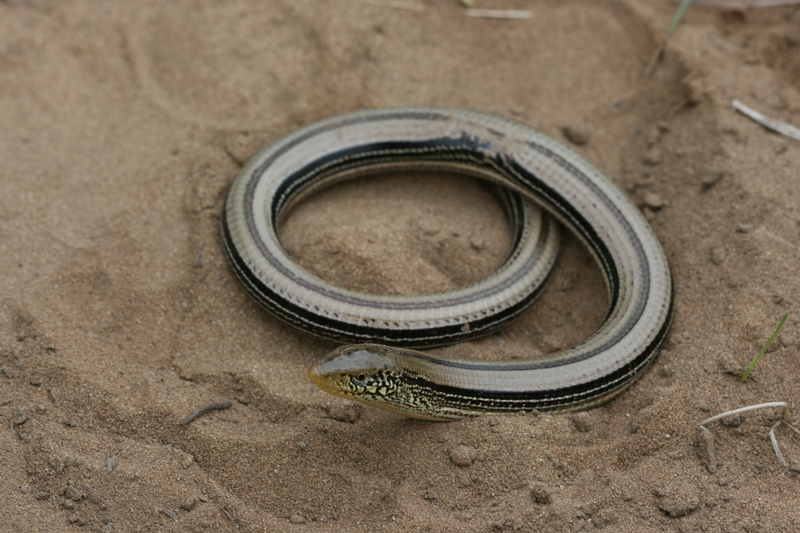
- Eastern slender glass lizard Ophisaurus attenuatus longicaudus
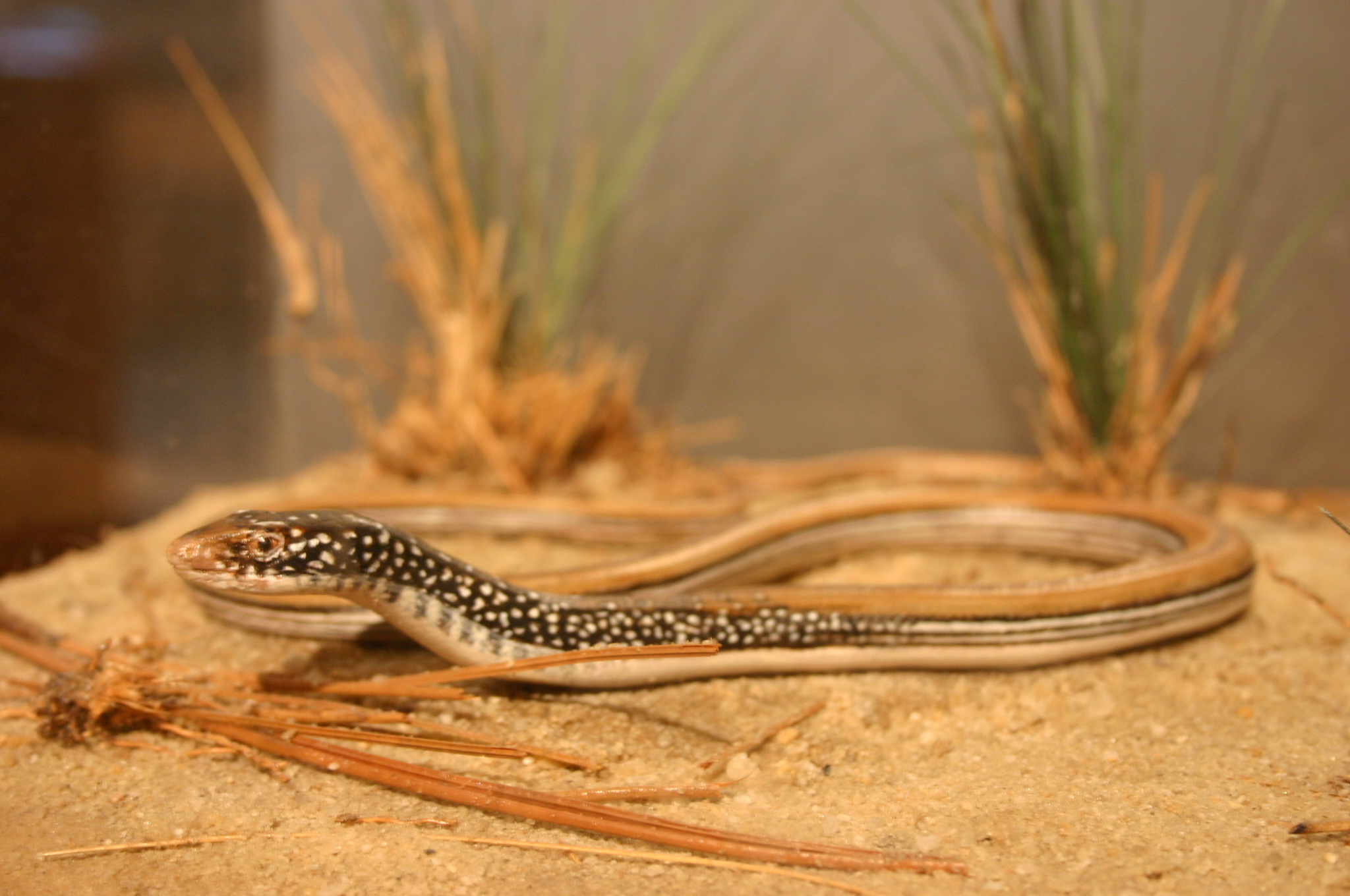
- Mimic glass lizard Ophisaurus mimicus
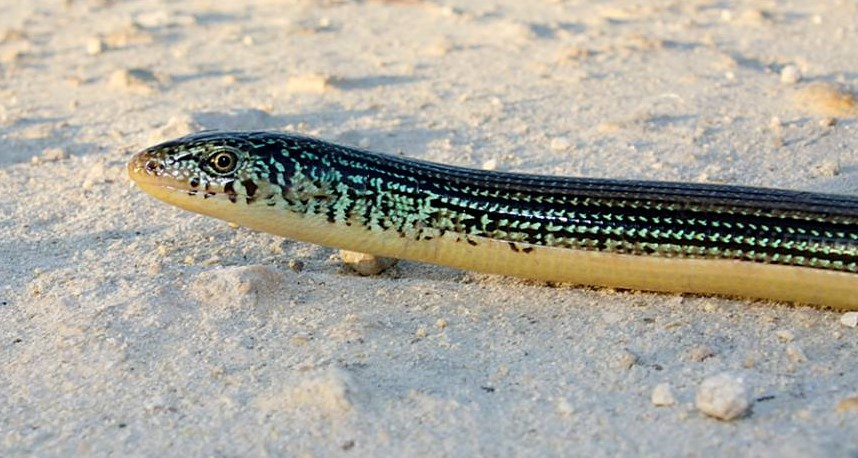
- Eastern glass lizard Ophisaurus ventralis

== Snakes ==
Order: Squamata

Suborder: Serpentes

Family: Colubridae
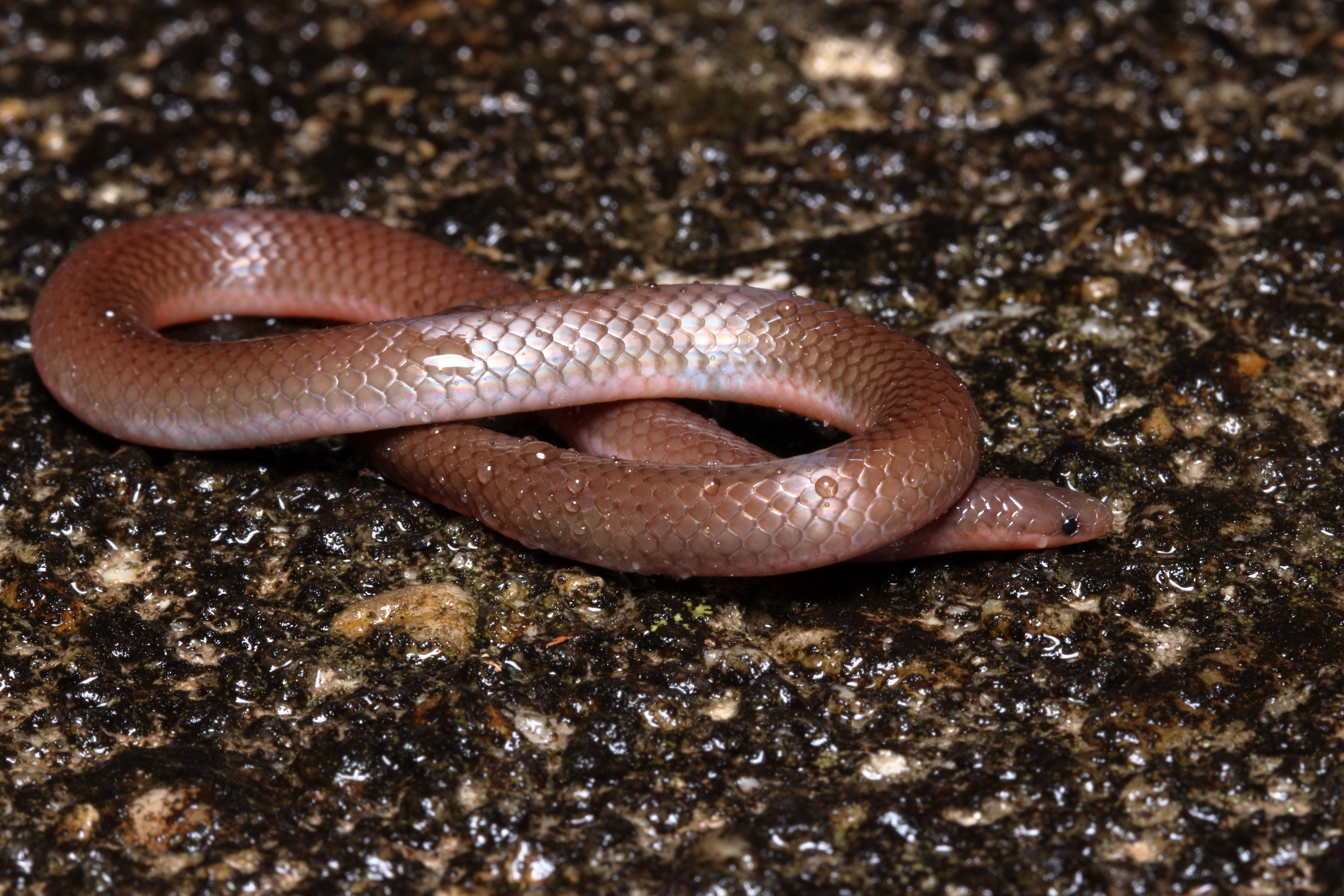
- Eastern wormsnake Carphophis amoenus amoenus
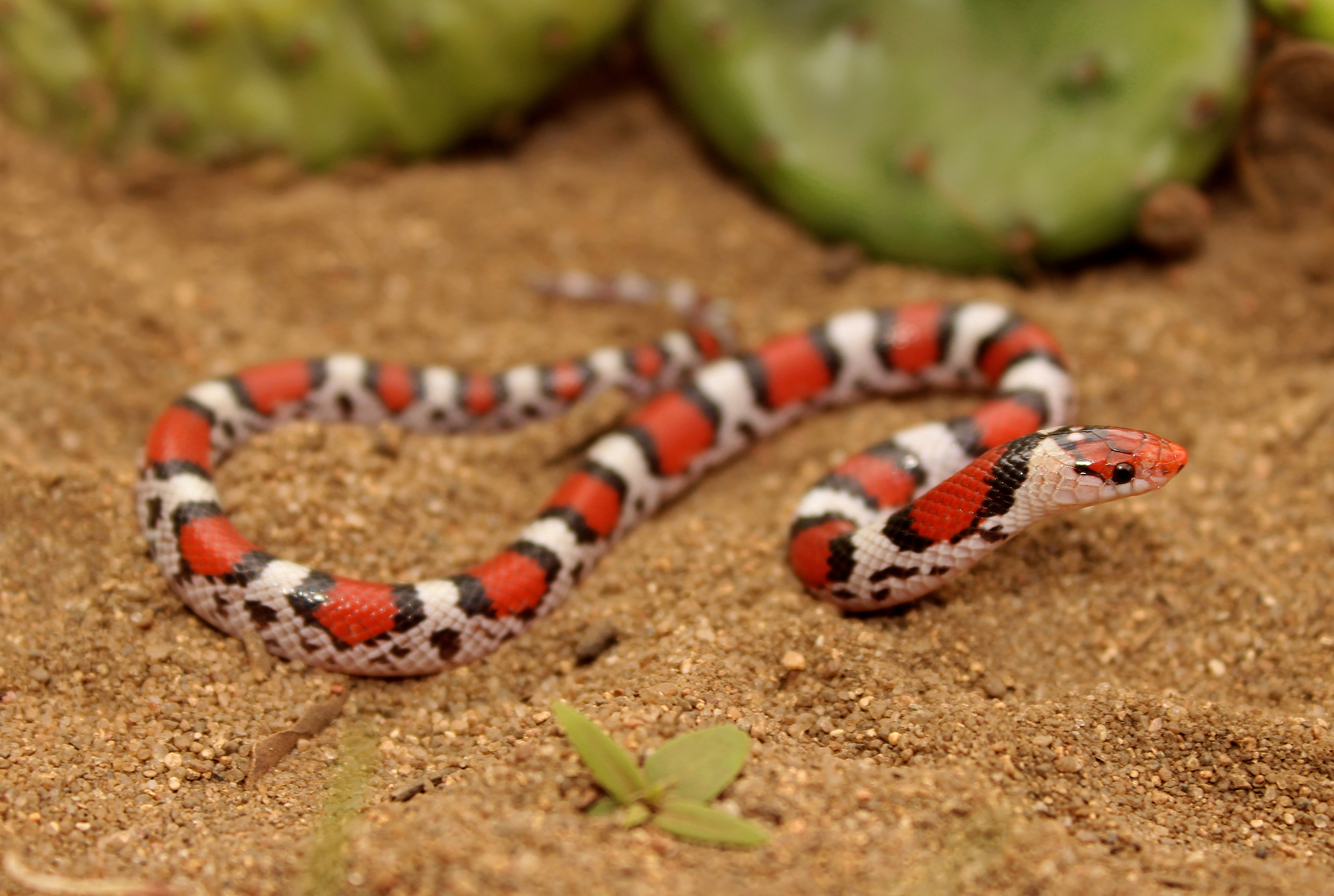
- Northern scarletsnake Cemophora coccinea copei
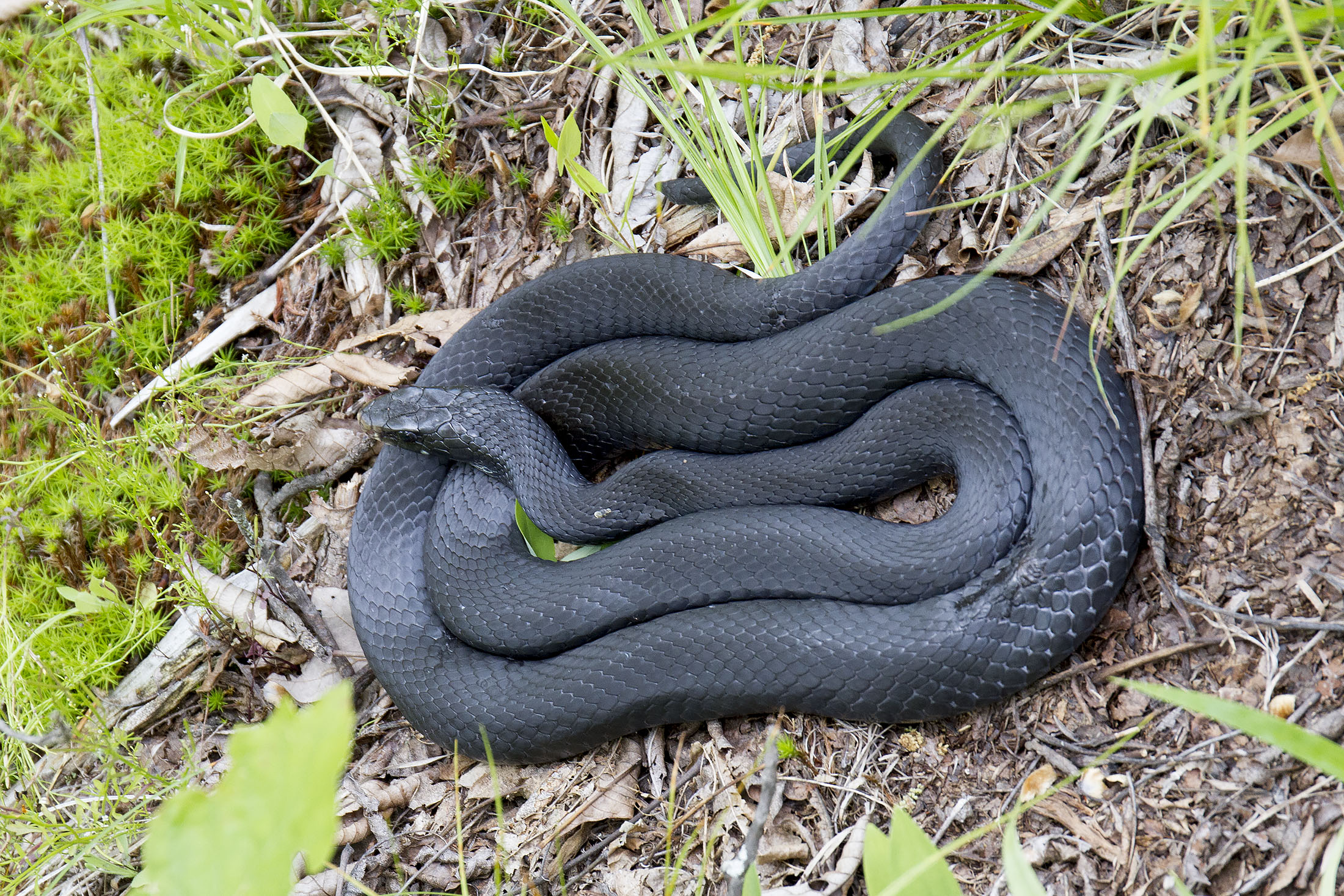
- Northern black racer Coluber constrictor constrictor
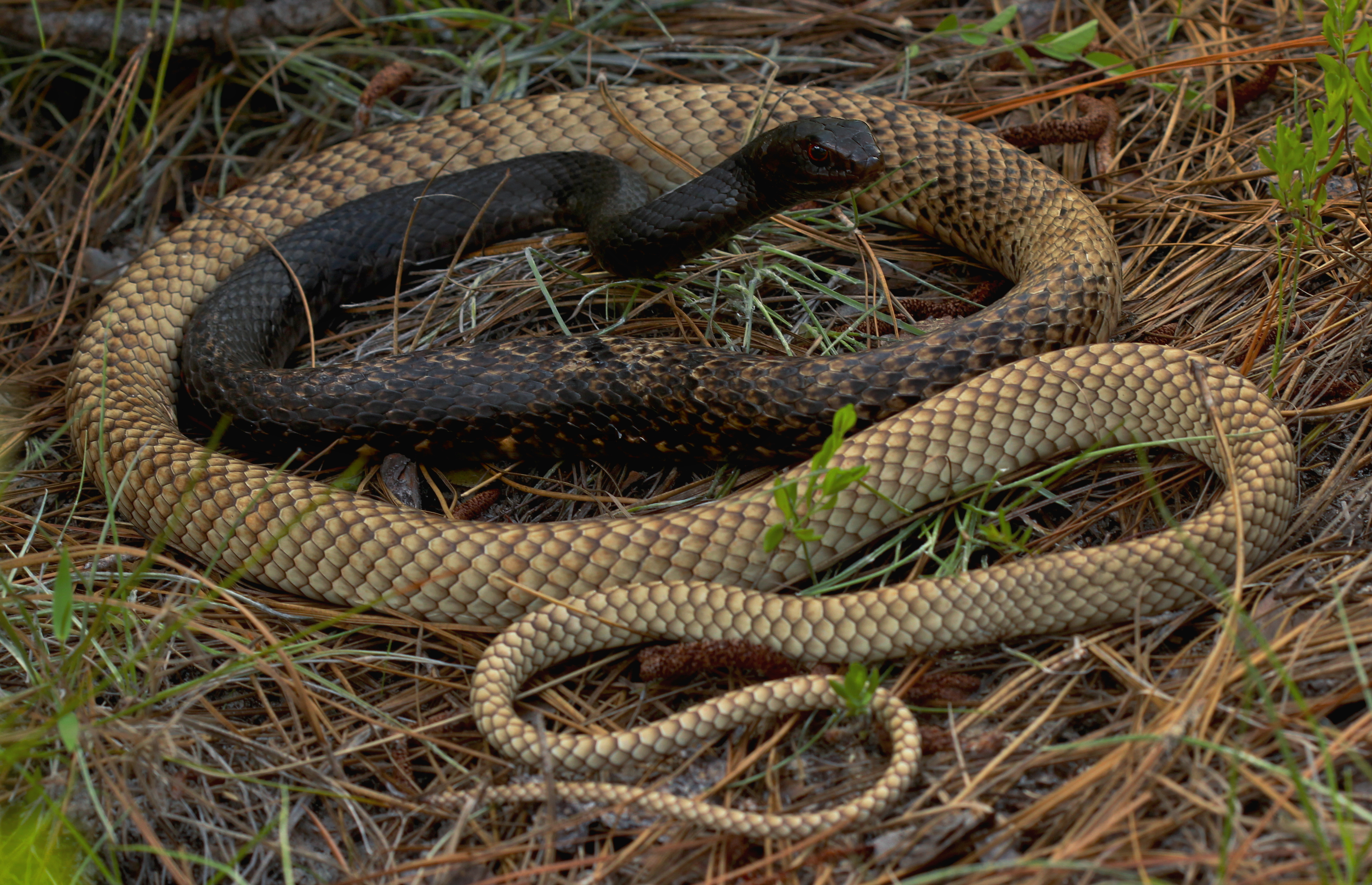
- Eastern coachwhip Coluber flagellum flagellum
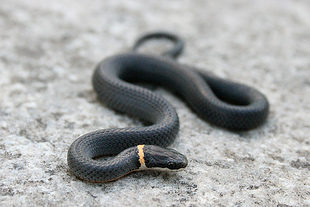
- Northern ring-necked snake Diadophis punctatus edwardsii
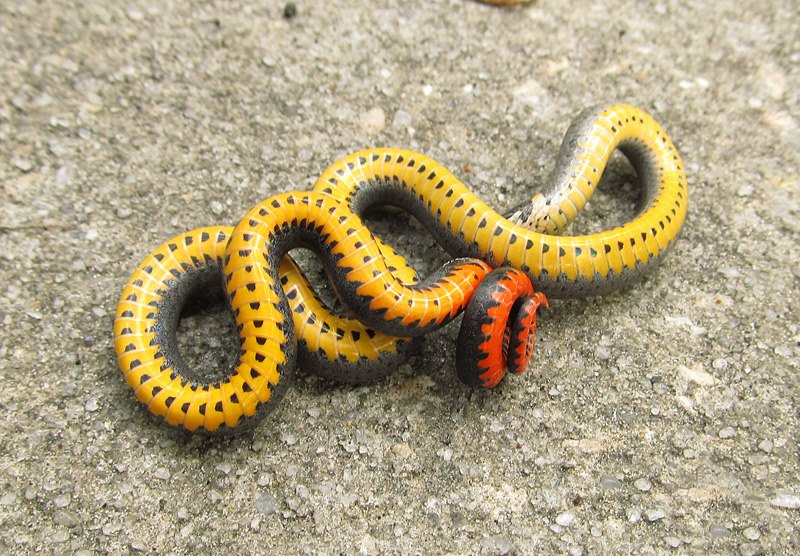
- Southern ring-necked snake Diadophis punctatus punctatus
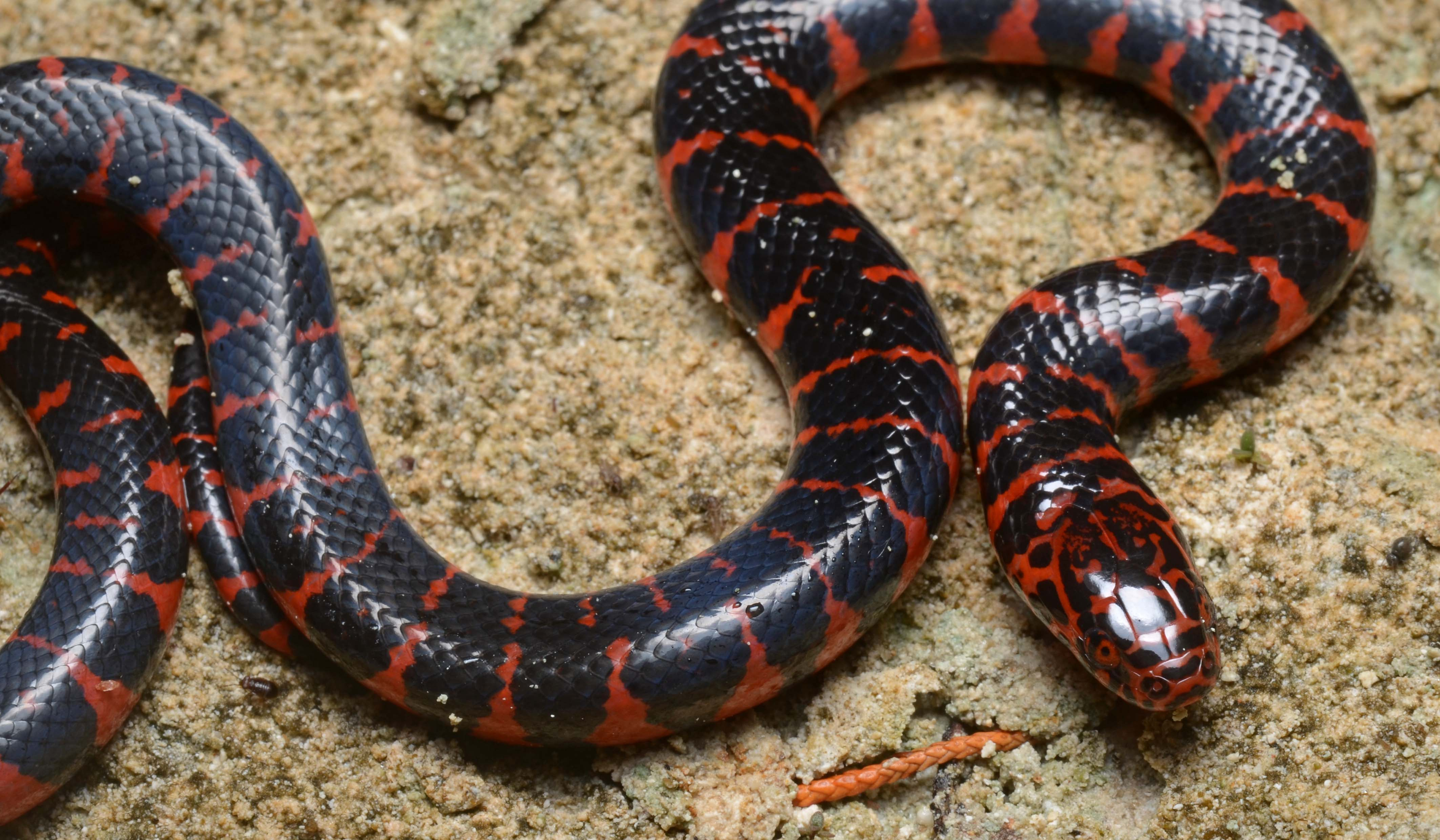
- Eastern mudsnake Farancia abacura abacura
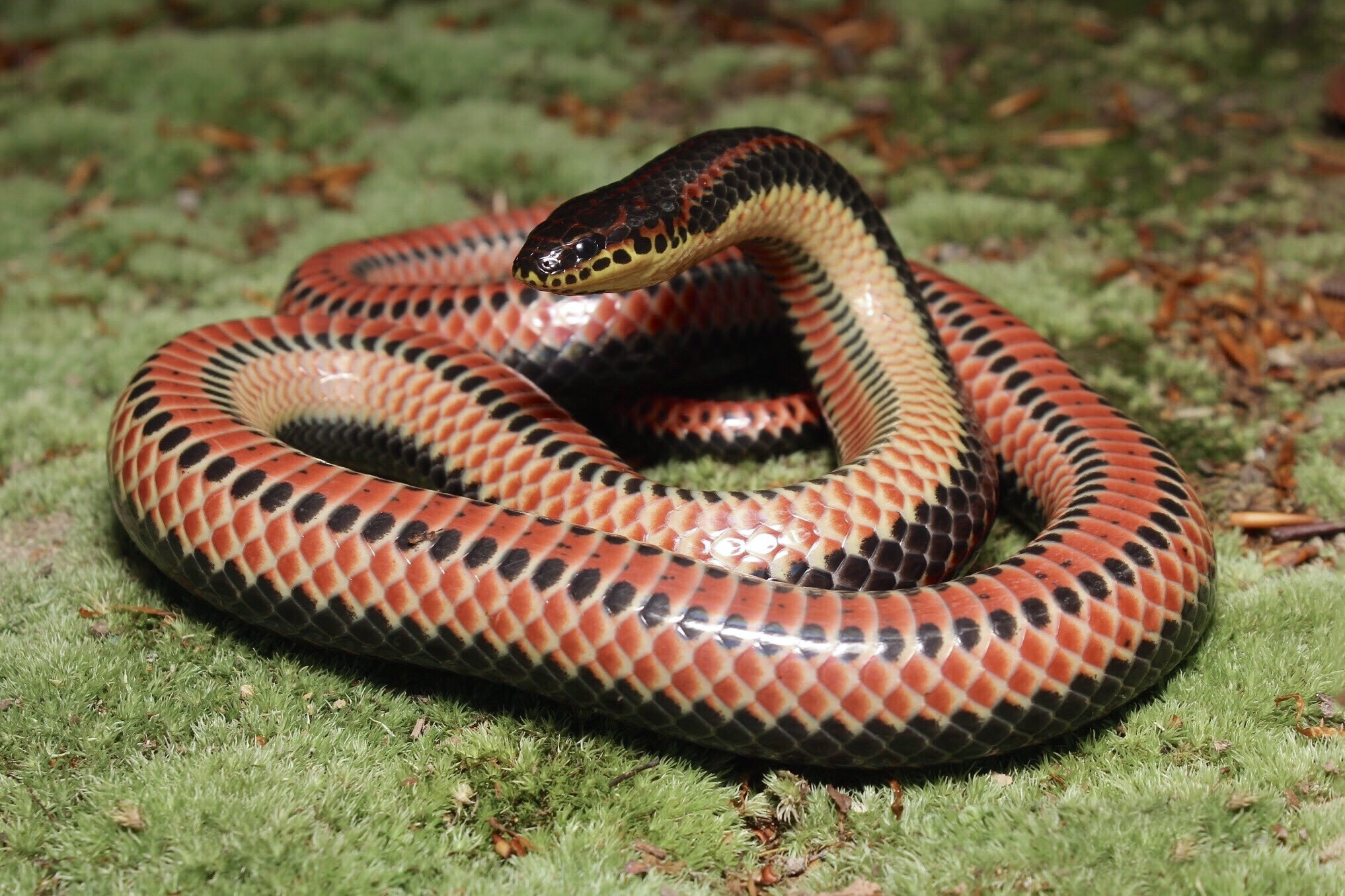
- Common rainbow snake Farancia erytrogramma erytrogramma
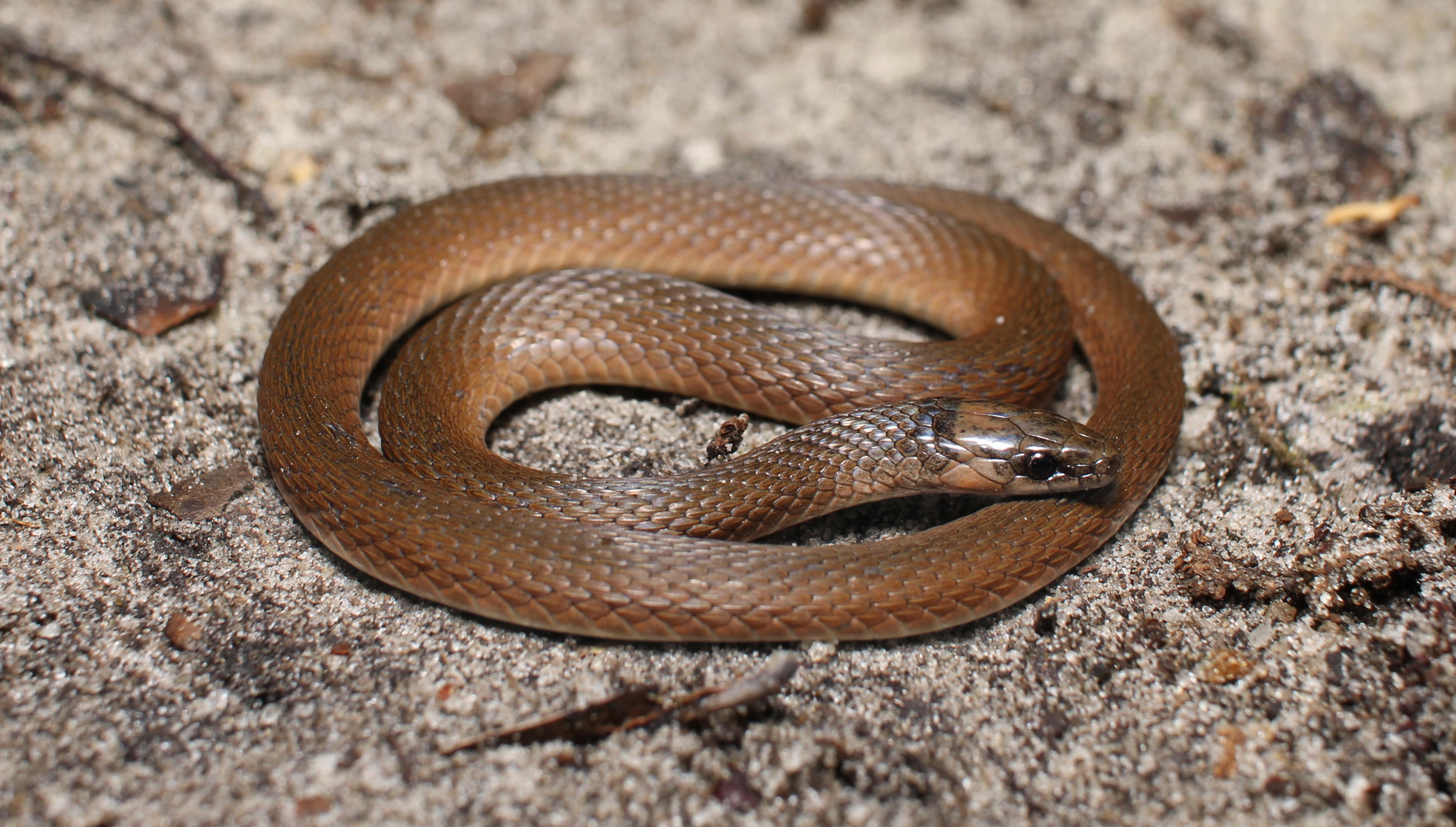
- Rough earthsnake Virginia striatula
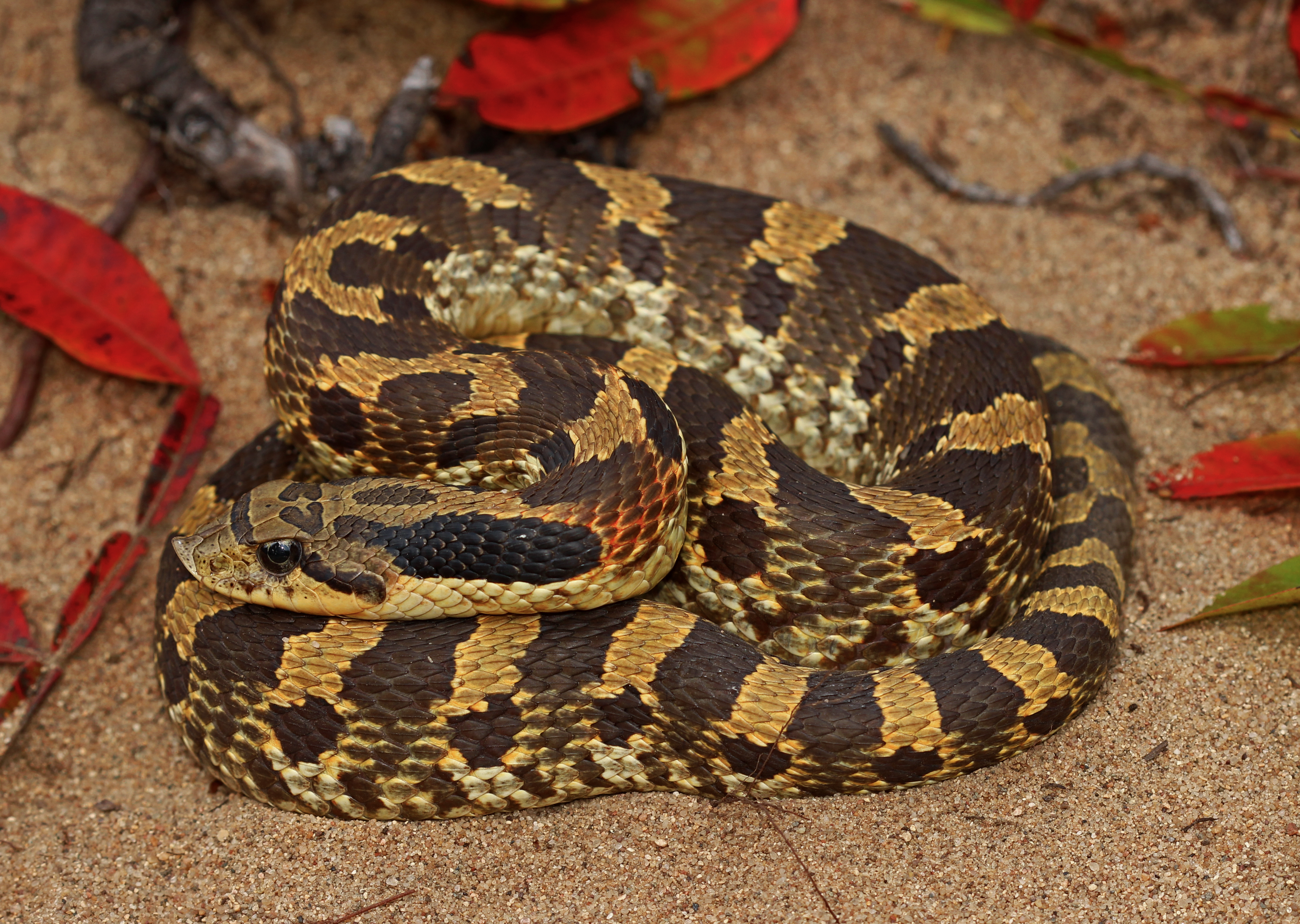
- Eastern hog-nosed snake Heterodon platirhinos
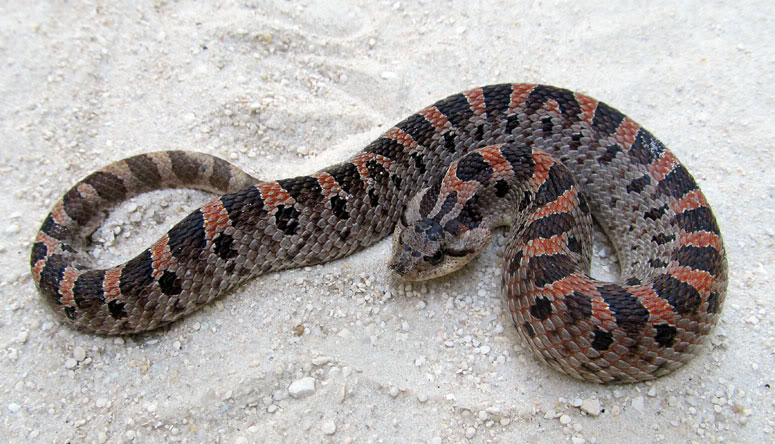
- Southern hog-nosed snake Heterodon simus
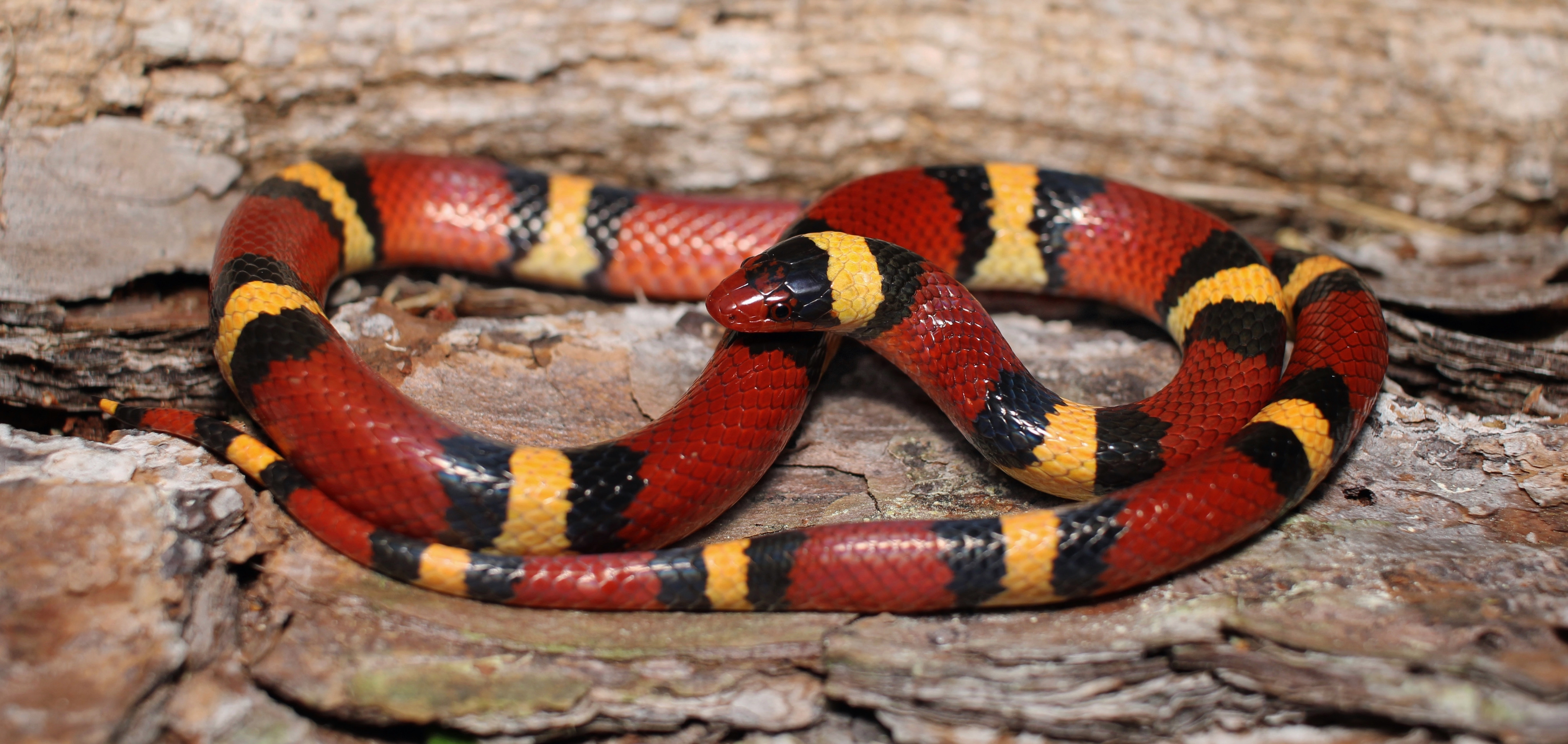
- Scarlet kingsnake Lampropeltis elapsoides
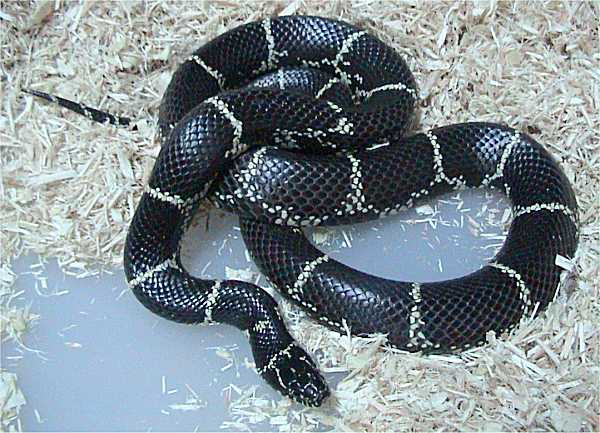
- Eastern kingsnake Lampropeltis getula
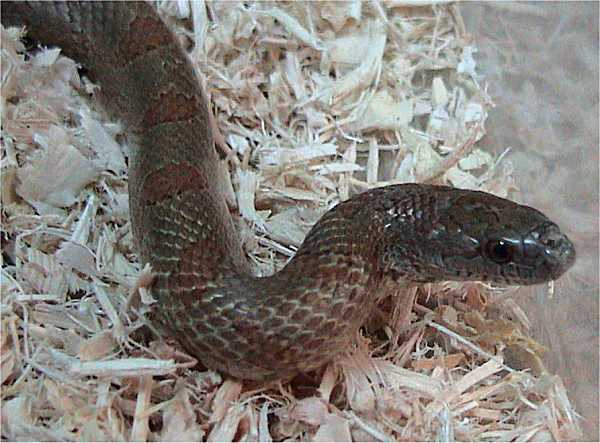
- Northern mole kingsnake Lampropeltis rhombomaculata
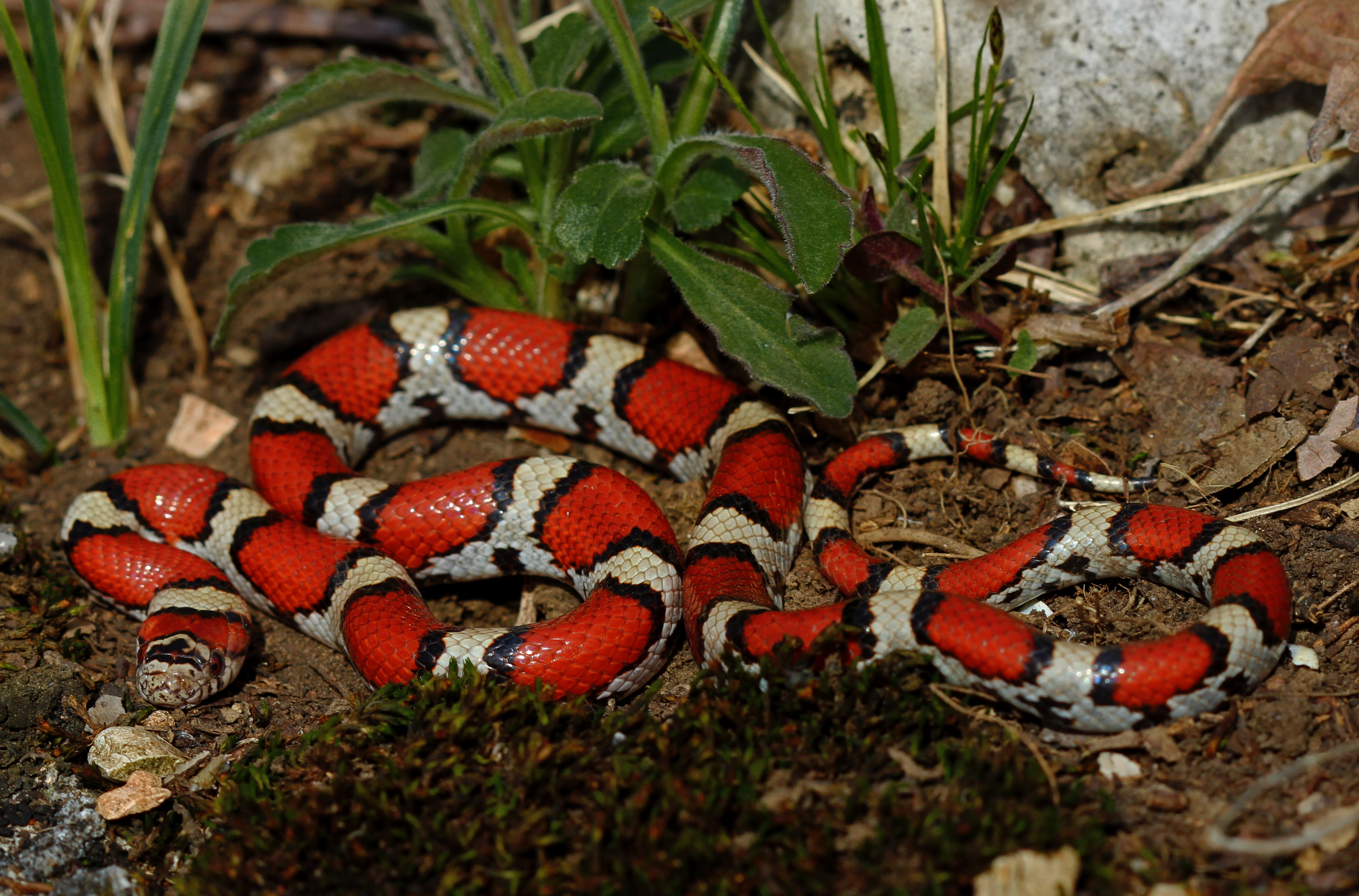
- Eastern milksnake Lampropeltis triangulum
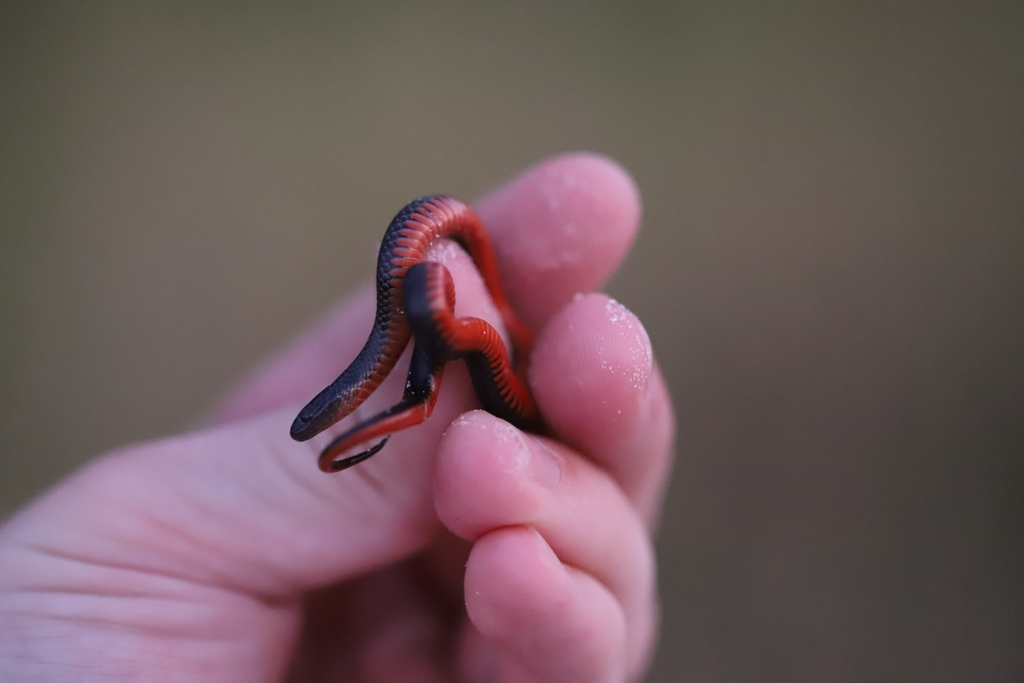
- Carolina swampsnake Liodytes pygaea paludis
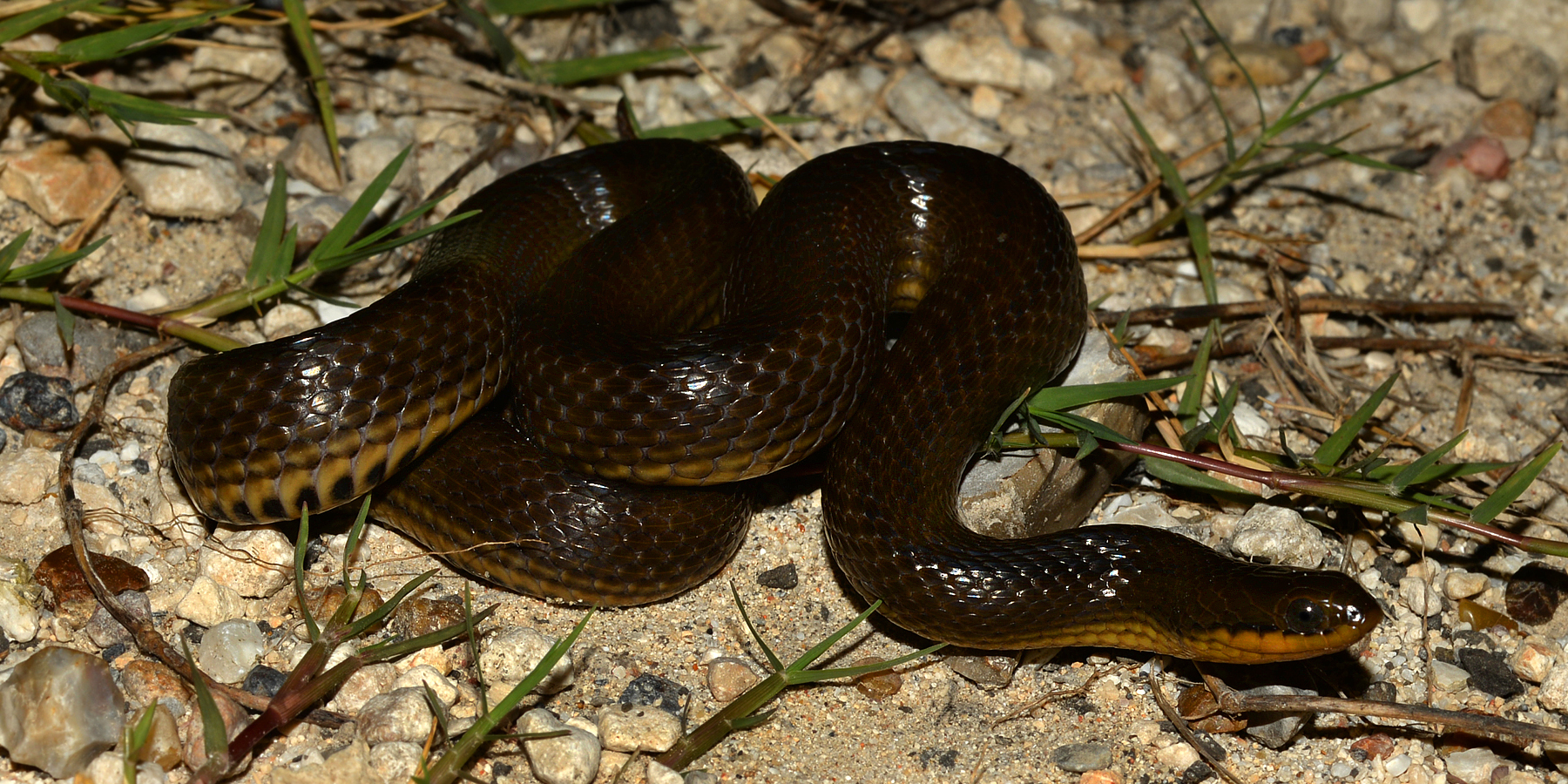
- Eastern glossy swampsnake Liodytes rigida rigida
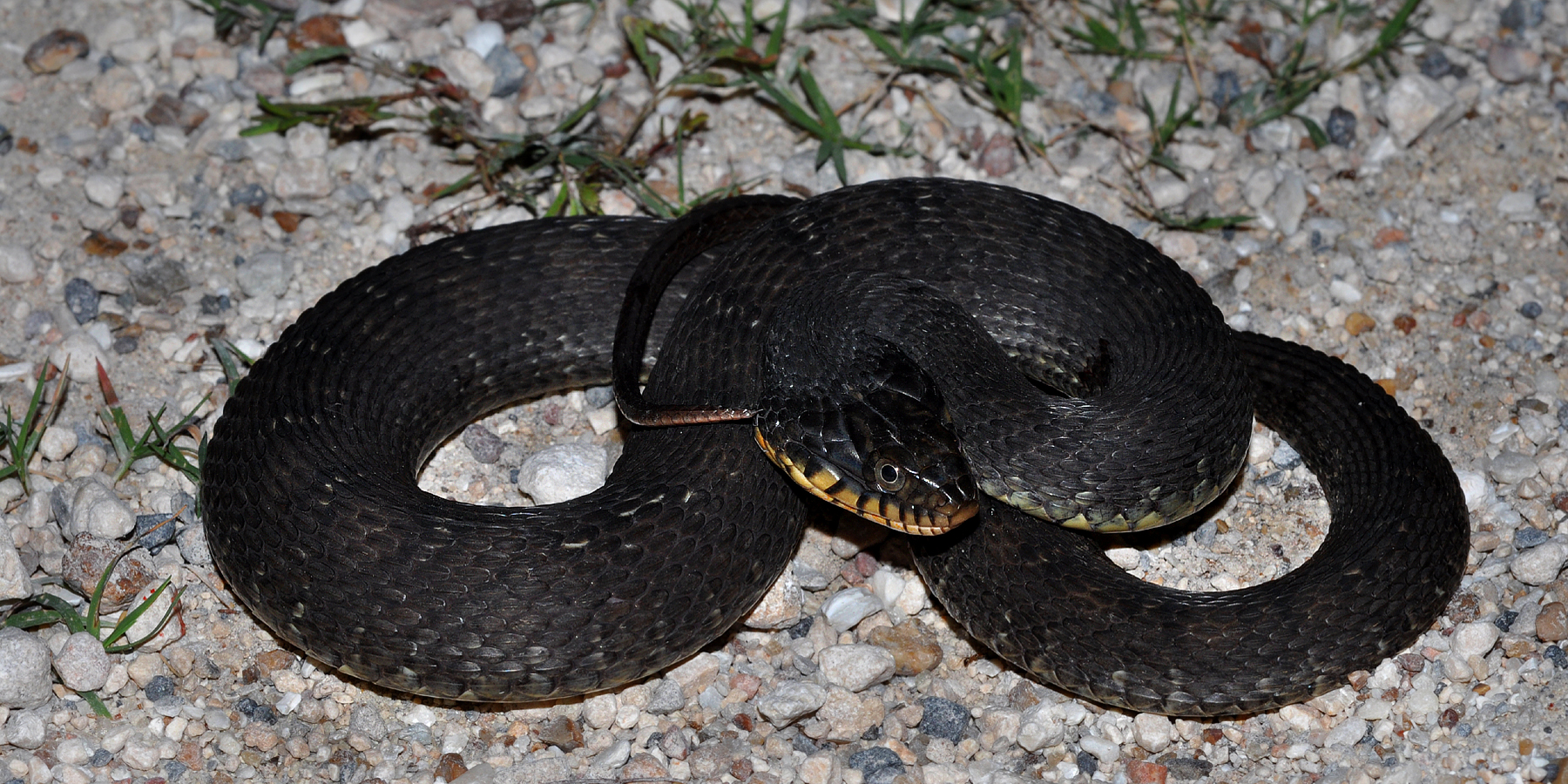
- Plain-bellied watersnake Nerodia erythrogaster
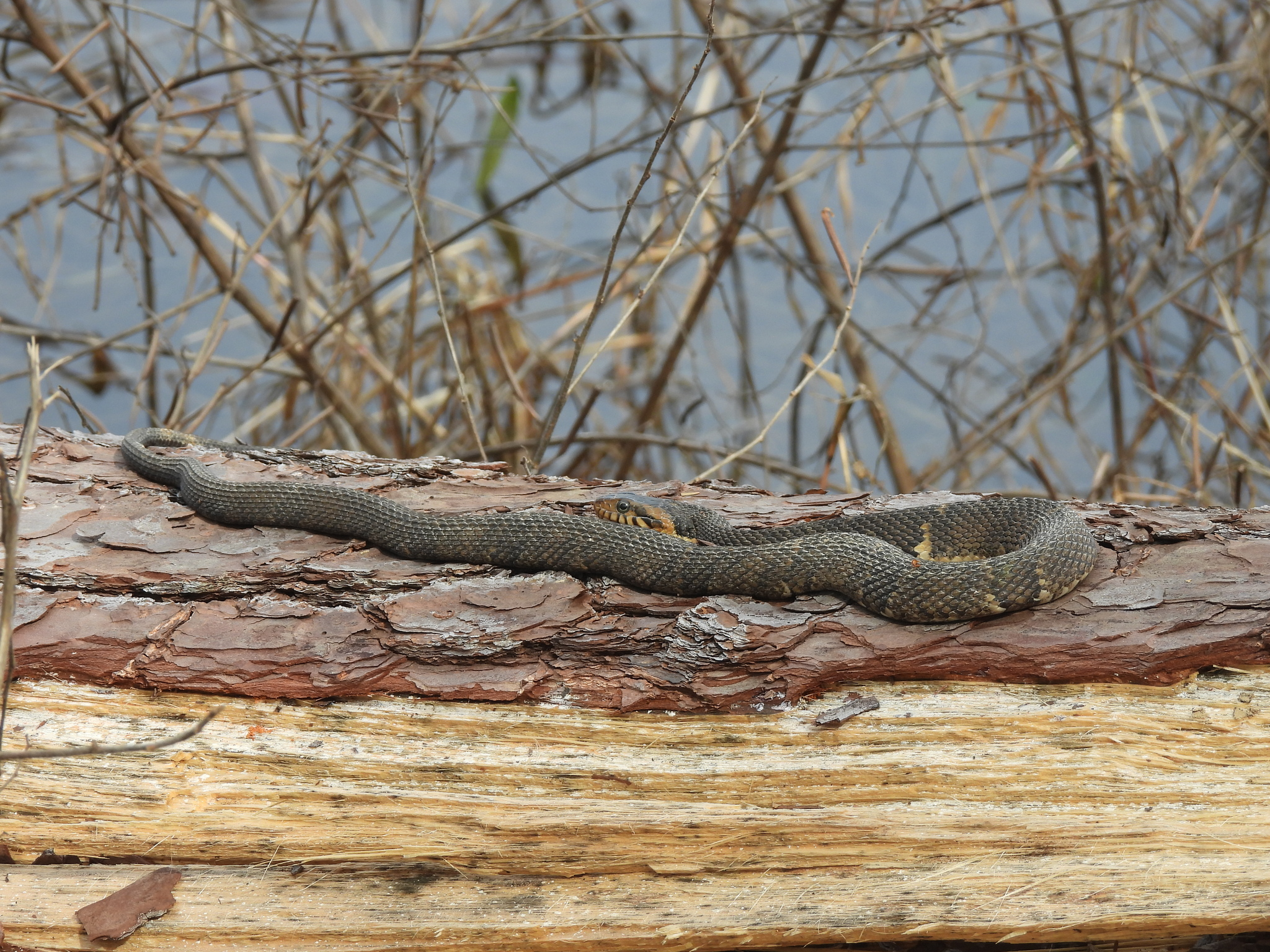
- Banded watersnake Nerodia fasciata fasciata
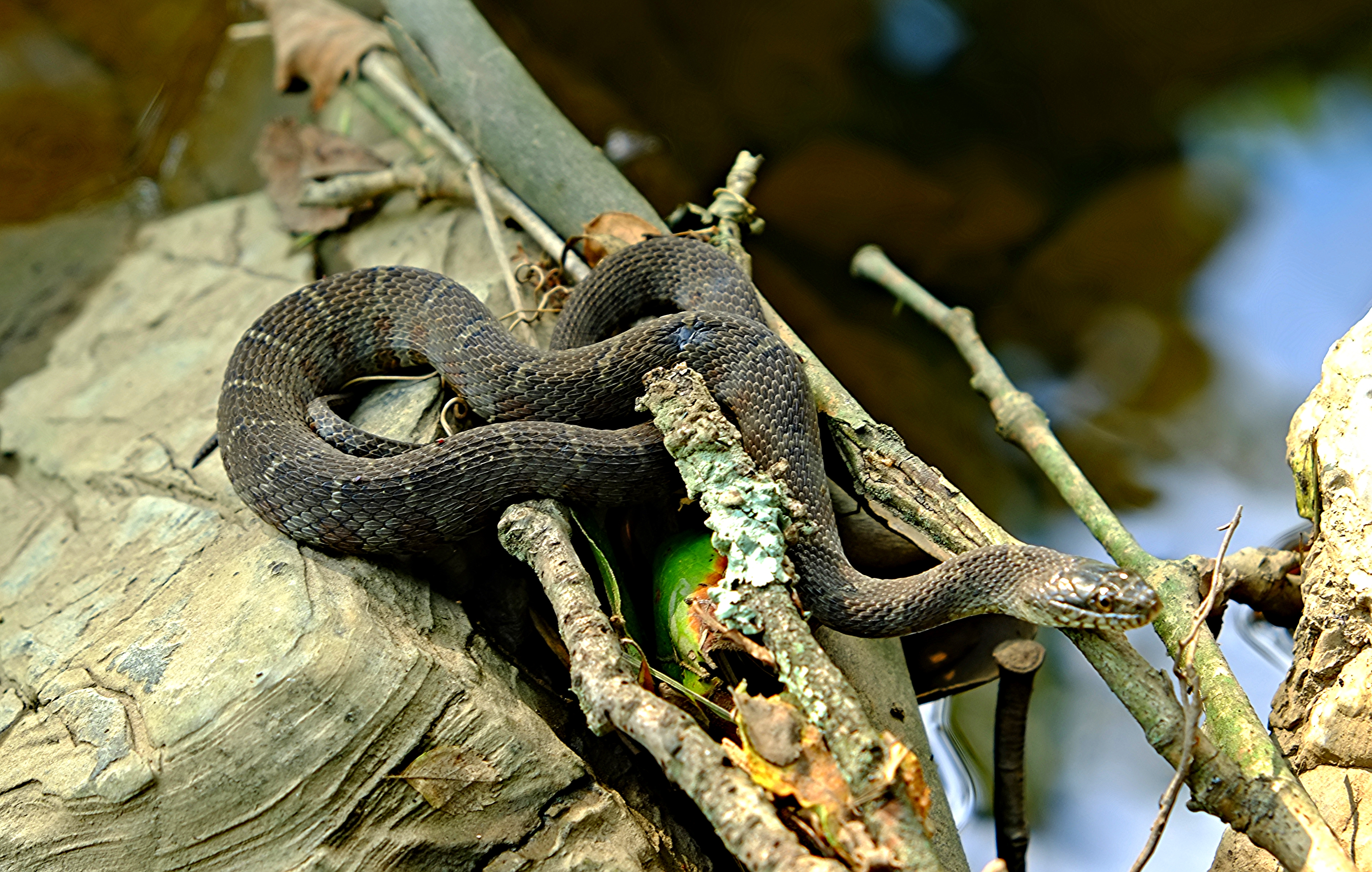
- Northern watersnake Nerodia sipedon sipedon
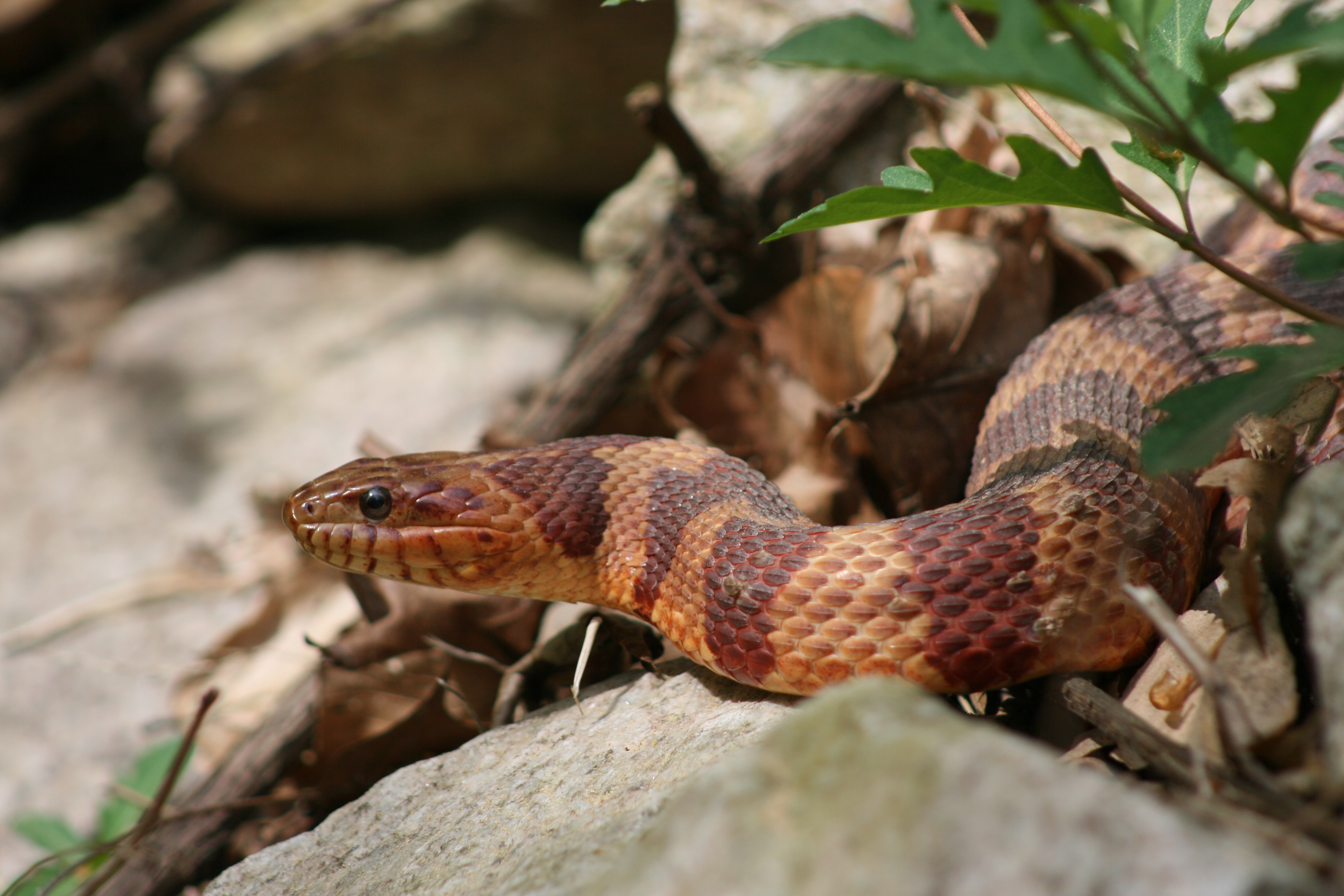
- Carolina watersnake Nerodia sipedon williamengelsi
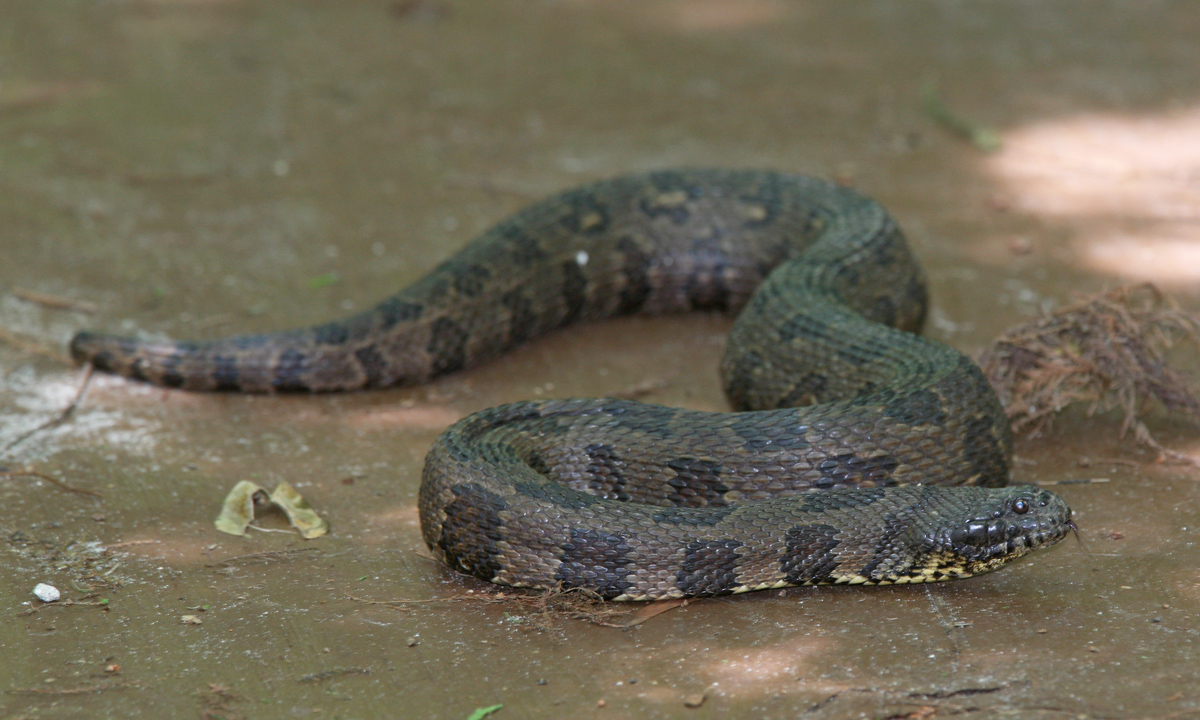
- Brown watersnake Nerodia taxispilota
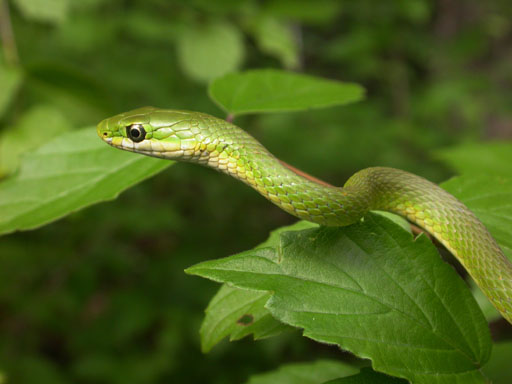
- Northern rough greensnake Opheodrys aestivus aestivus
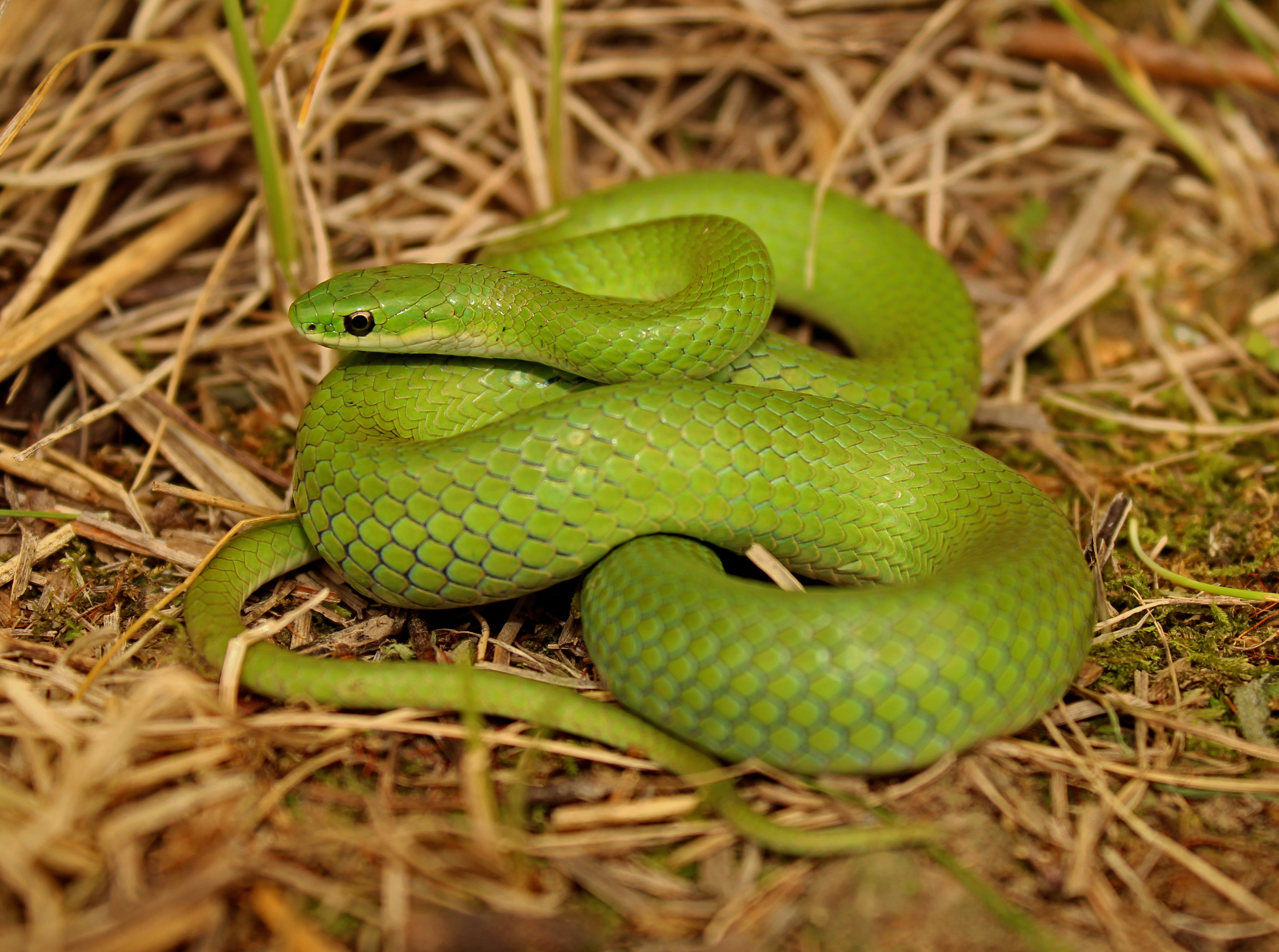
- Smooth greensnake Opheodrys vernalis
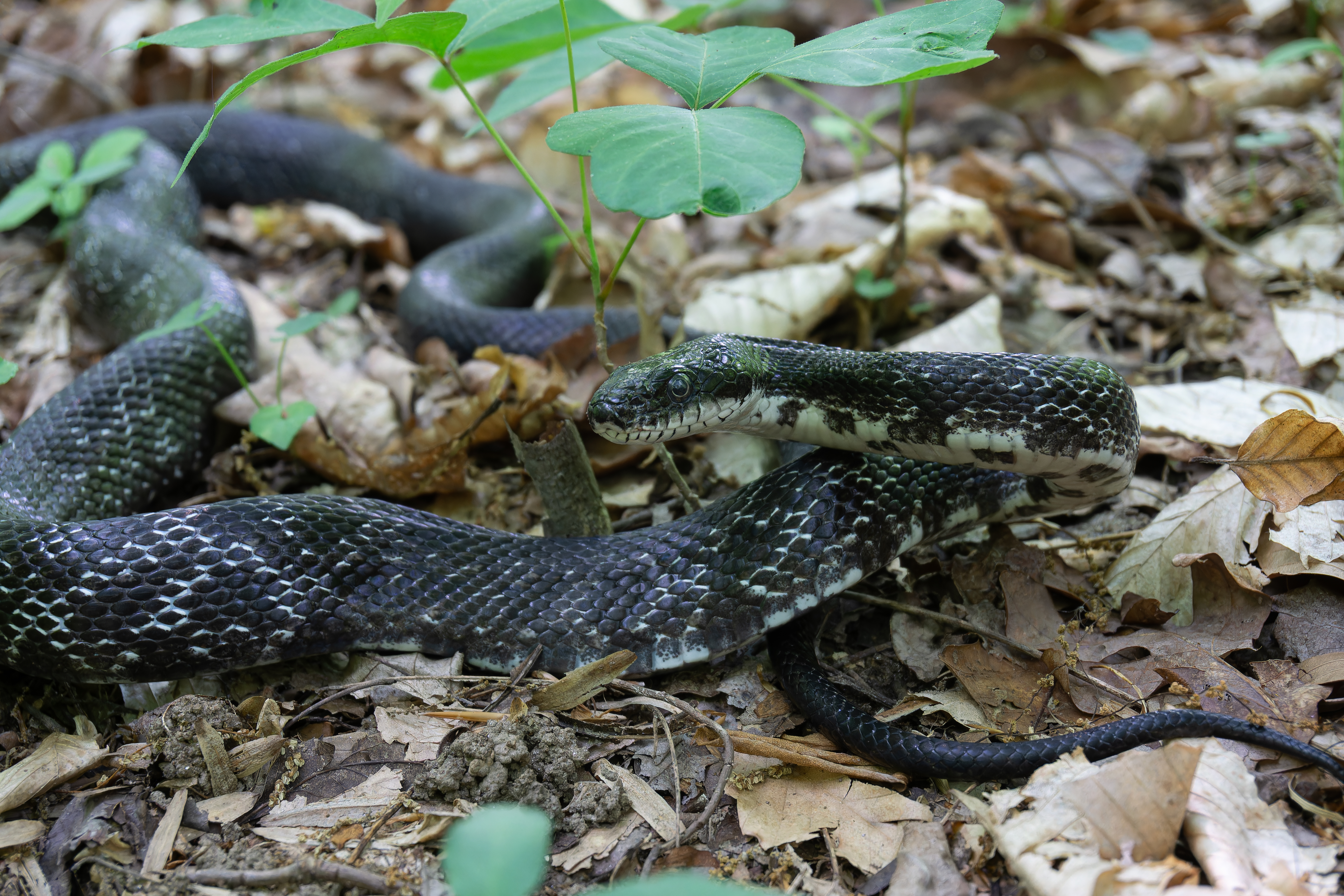
- Eastern ratsnake Pantherophis quadrivittatus
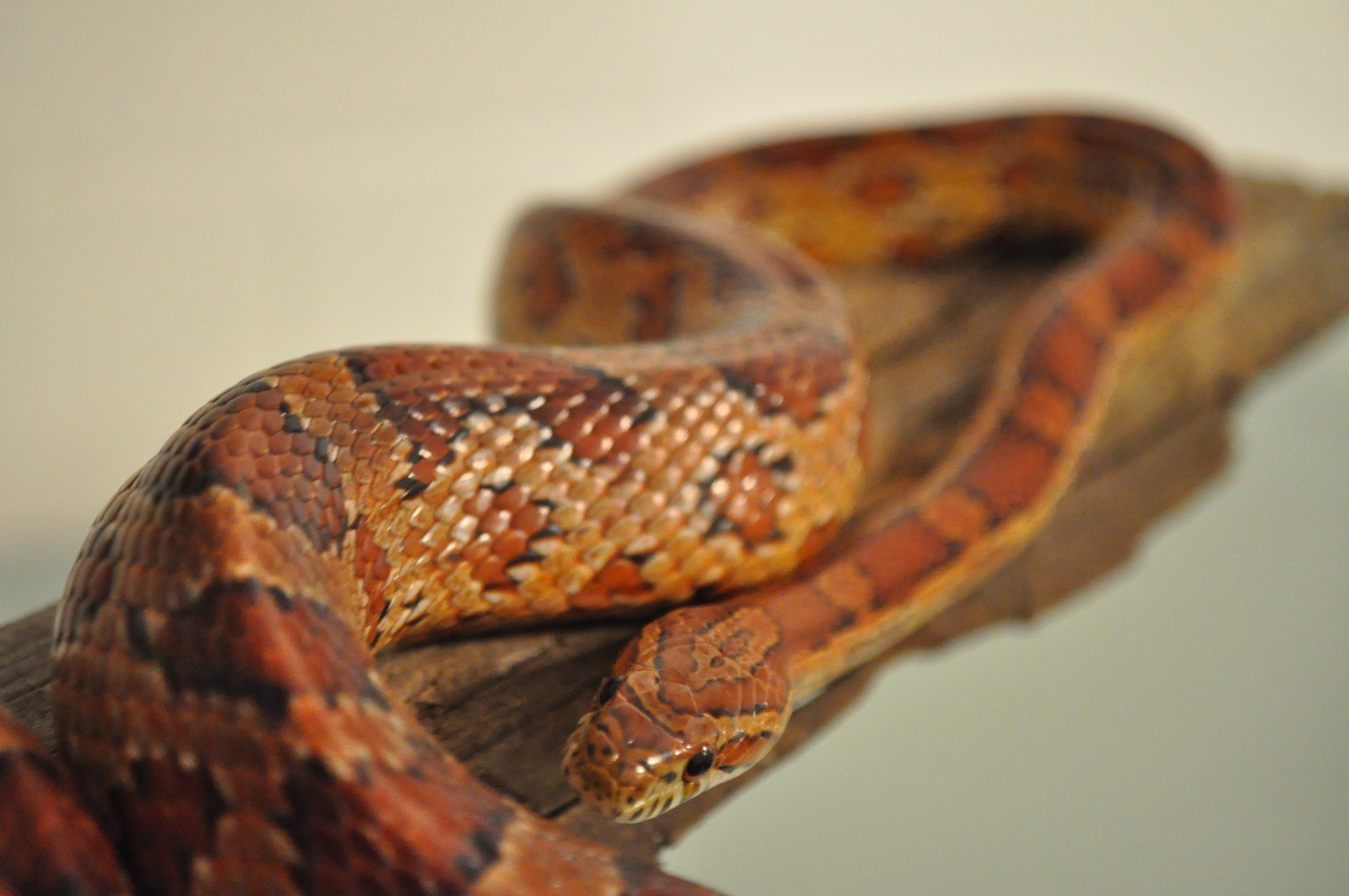
- Red cornsnake Pantherophis guttatus
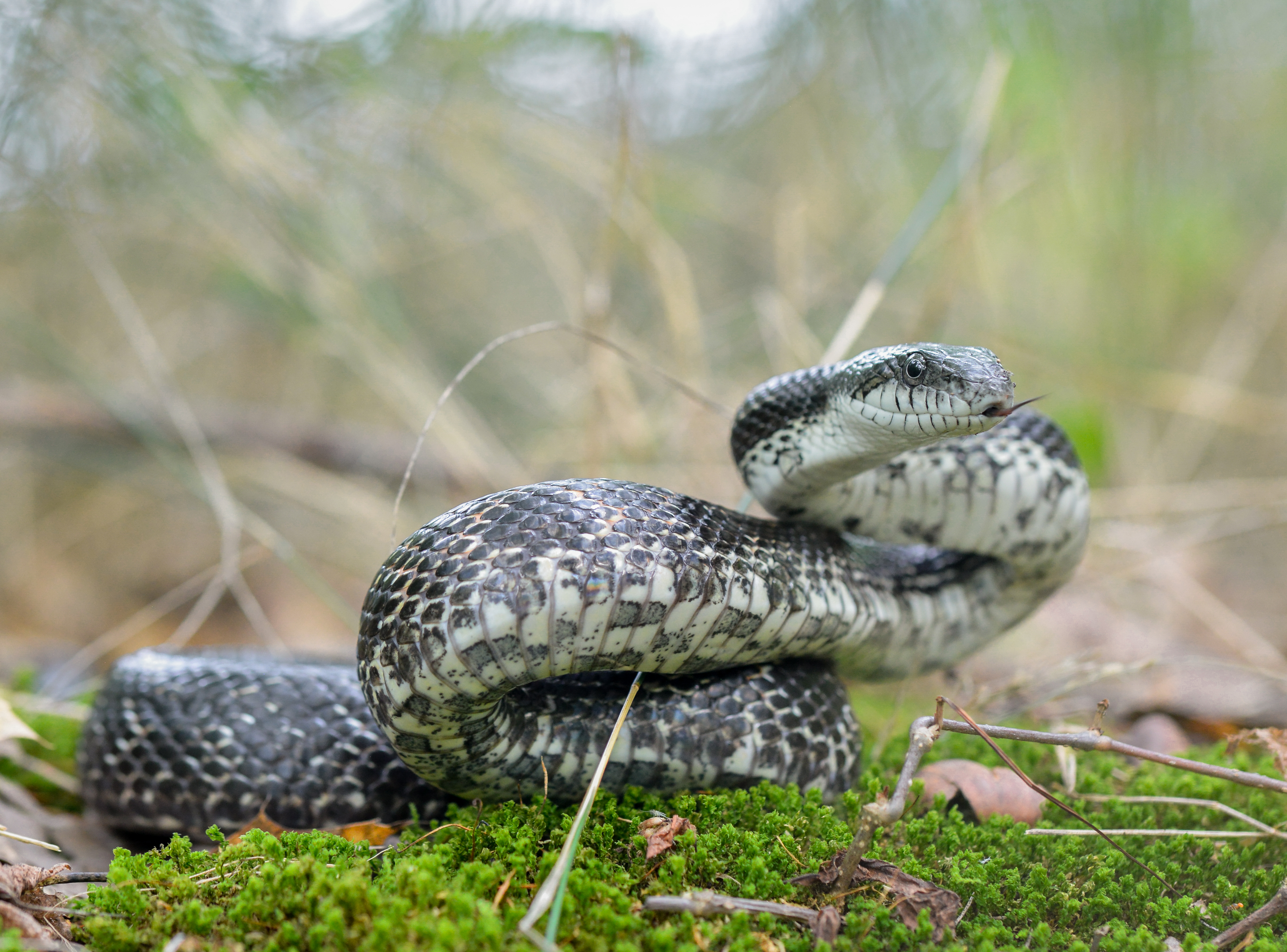
- Gray ratsnake Pantherophis alleghaniensis
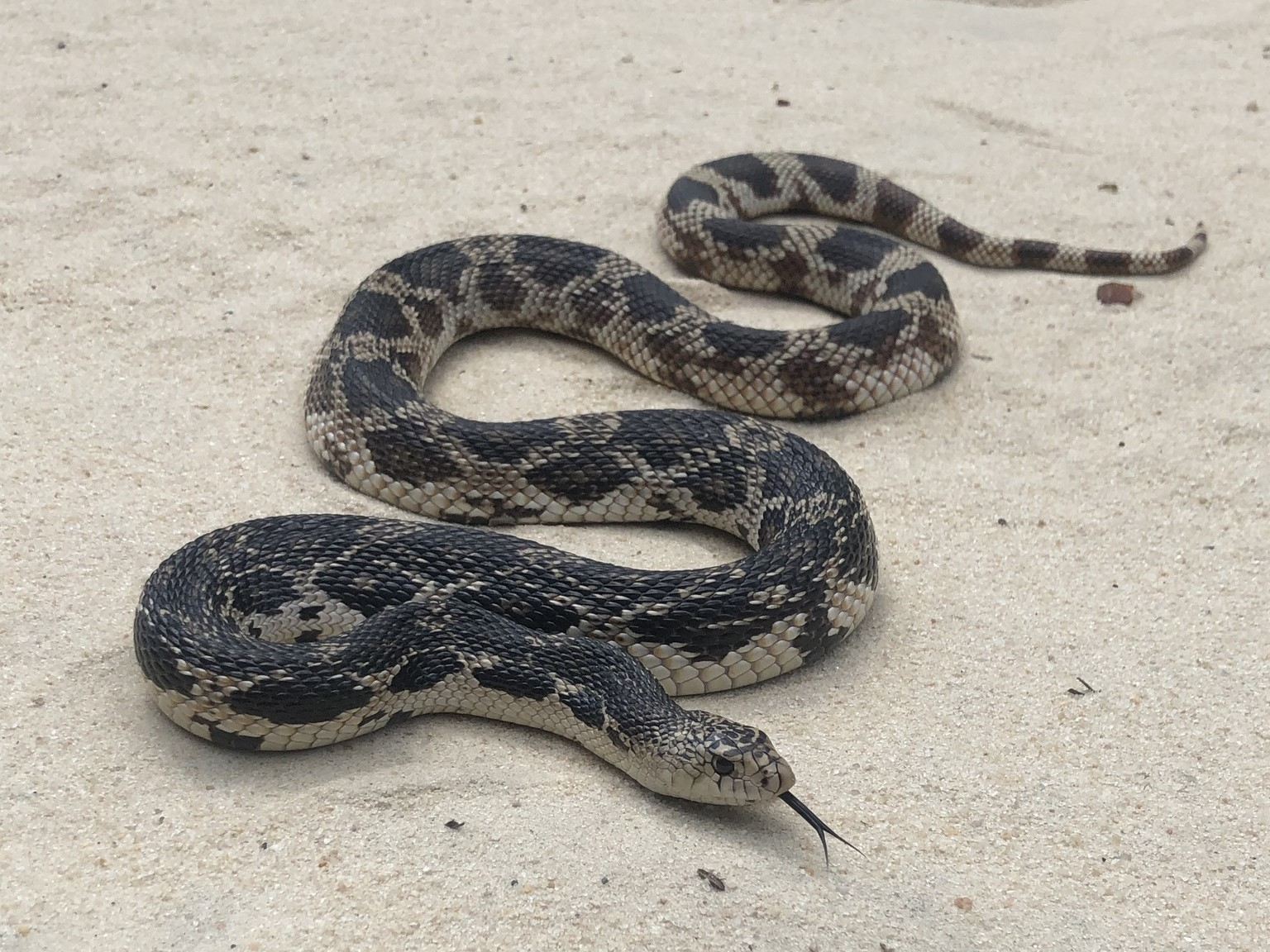
- Northern pinesnake Pituophis melanoleucus melanoleucus
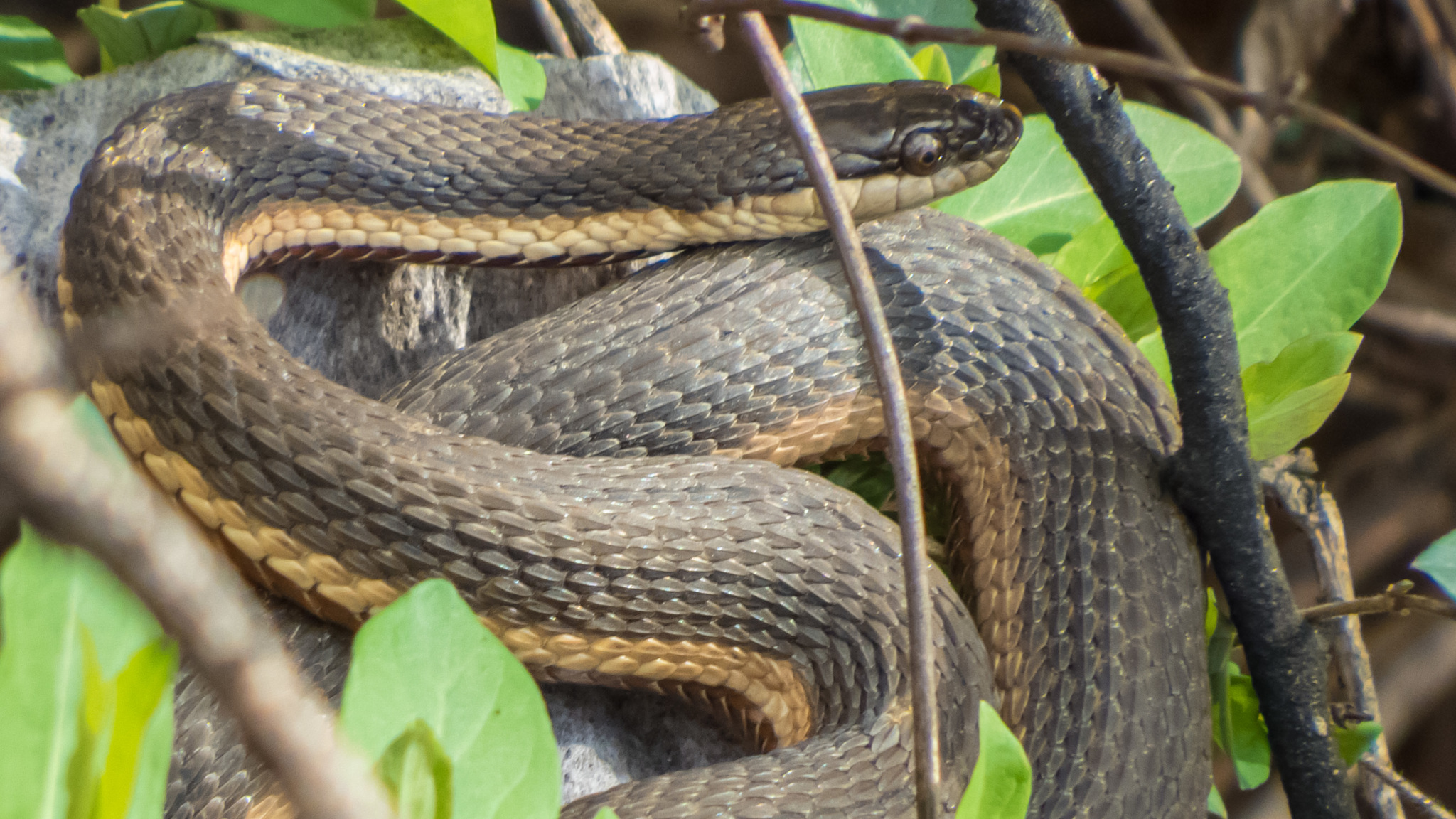
- Queensnake Regina septemvittata
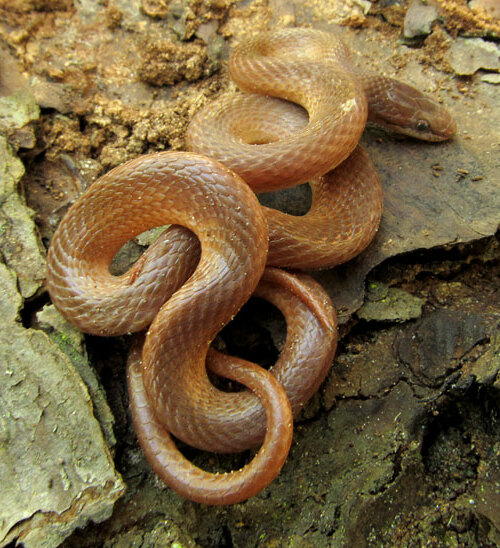
- Pine woods littersnake Rhadinaea flavilata
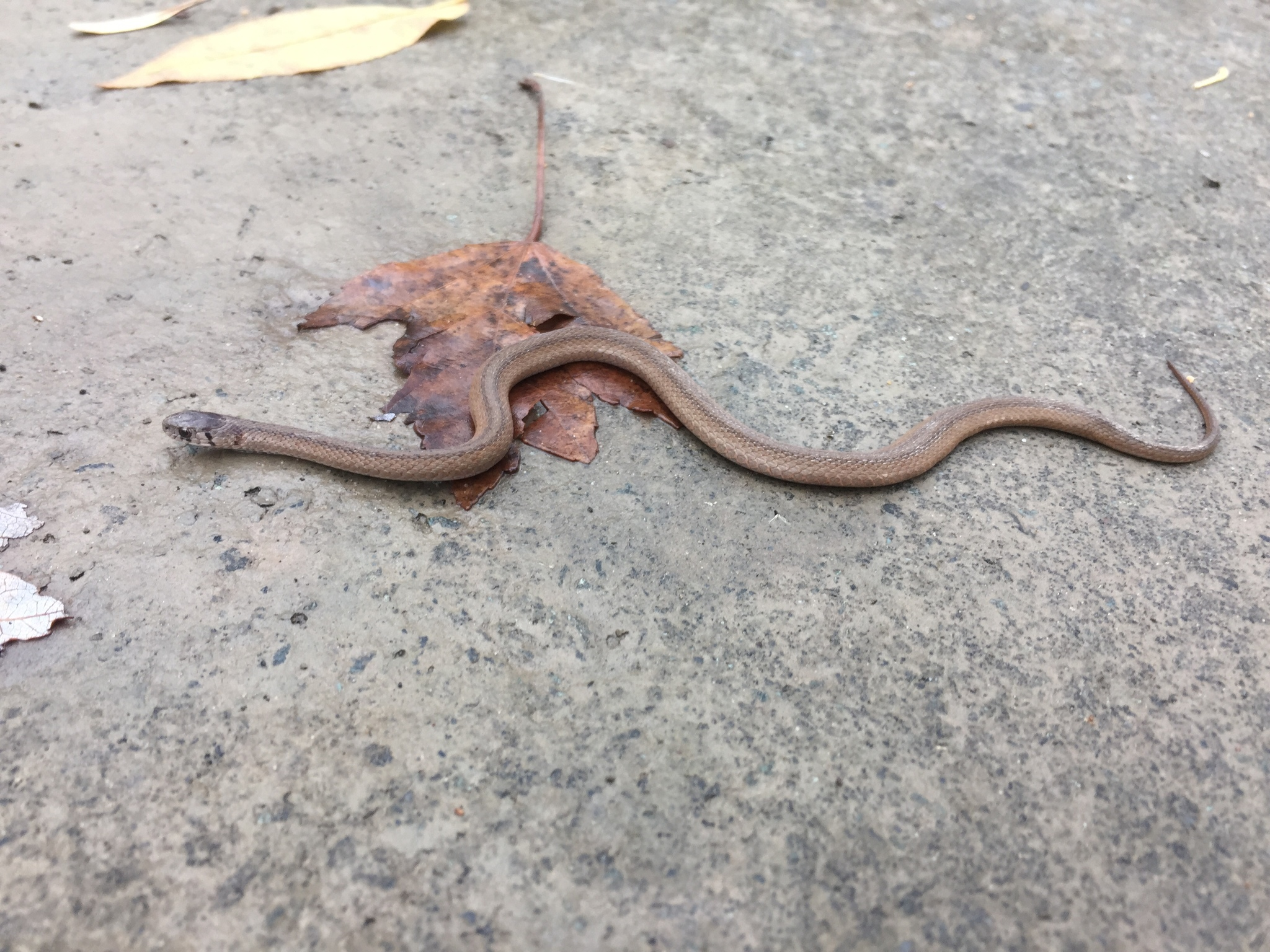
- Dekay's brownsnake Storeria dekayi
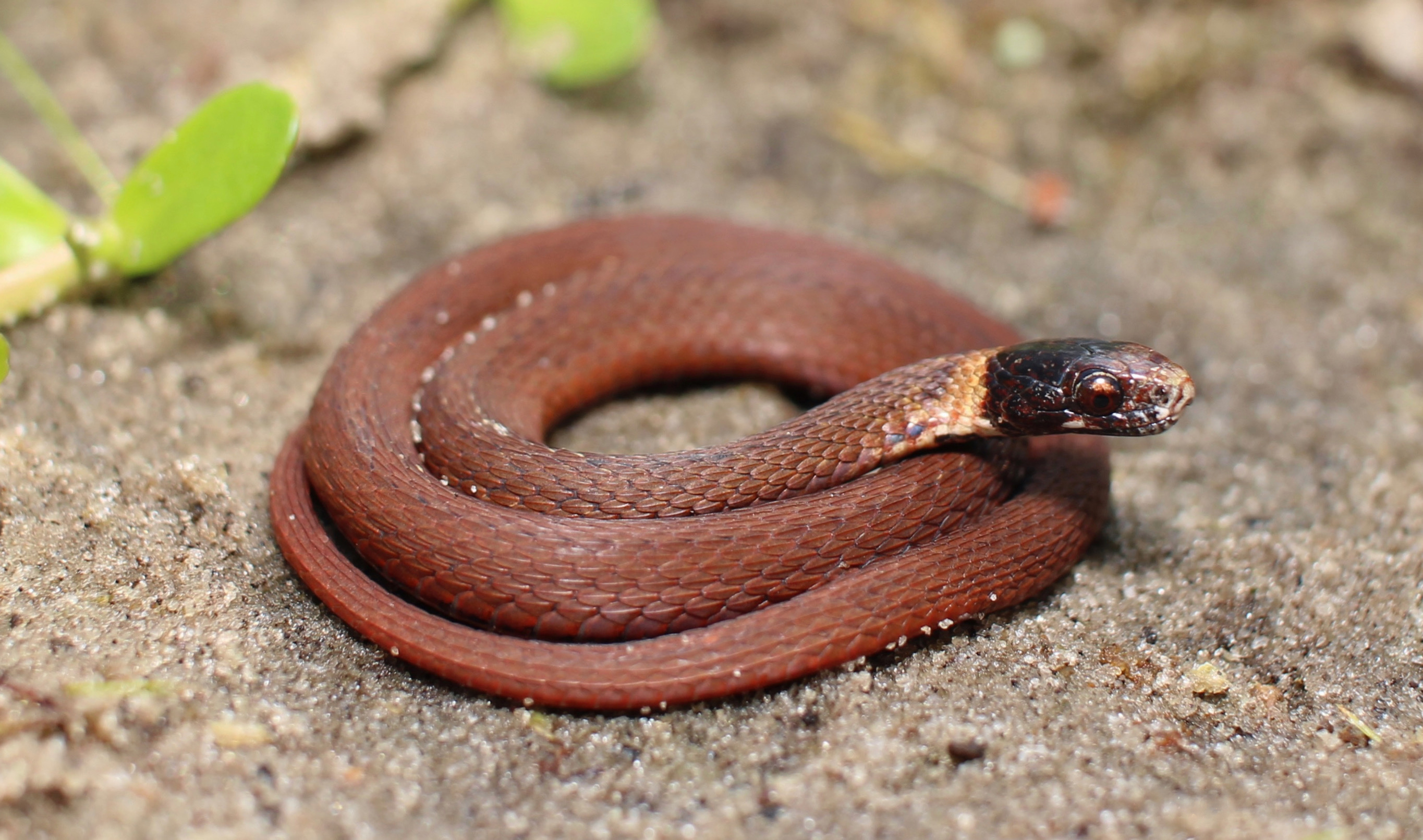
- Red-bellied snake Storeria occipitomaculata
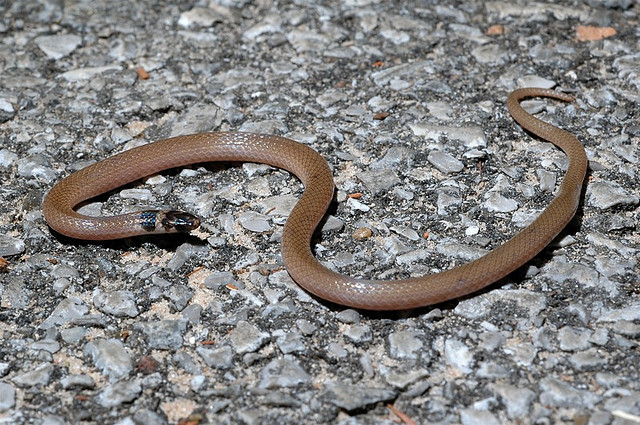
- Southeastern crowned snake Tantilla coronata
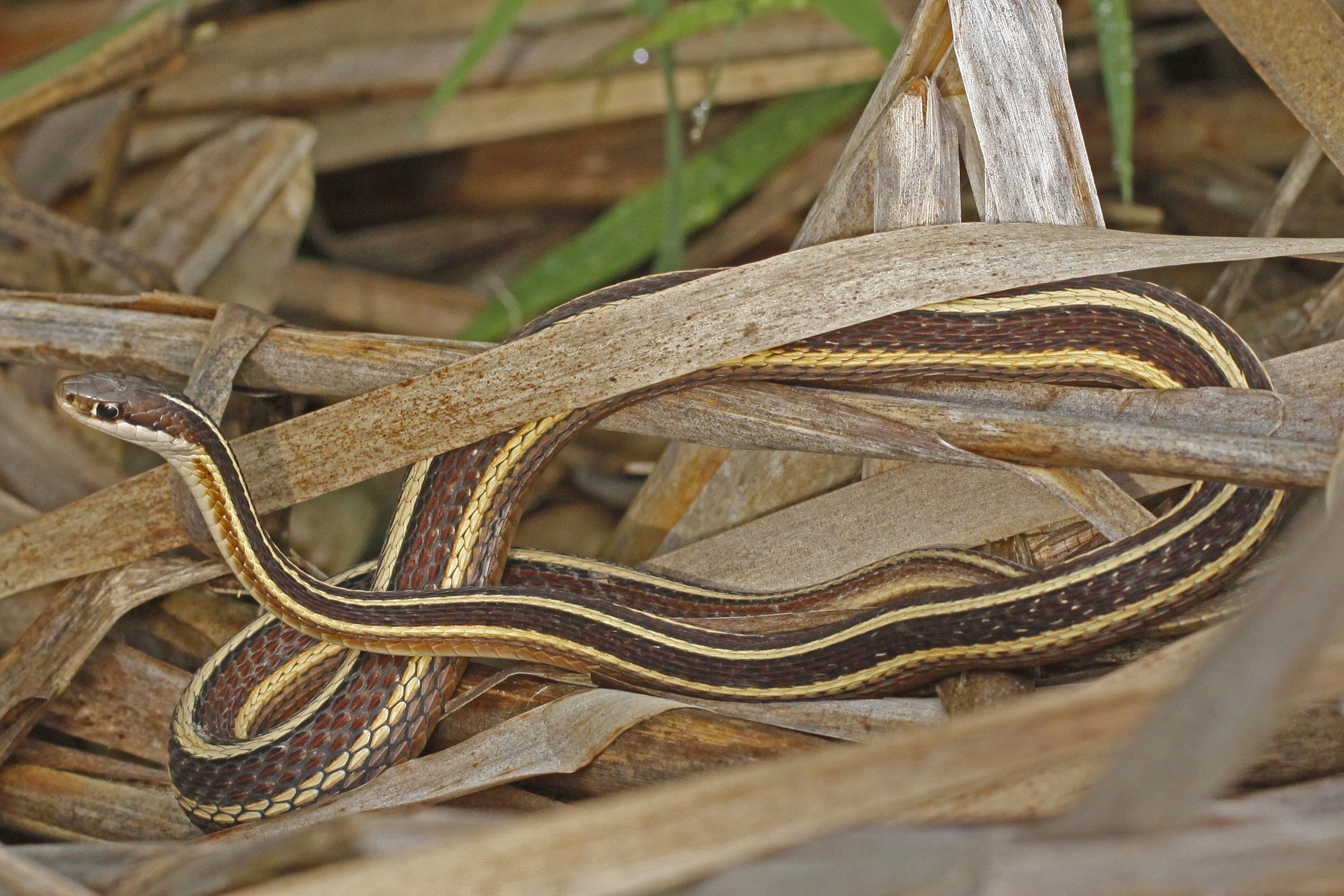
- Common ribbonsnake Thamnophis saurita saurita
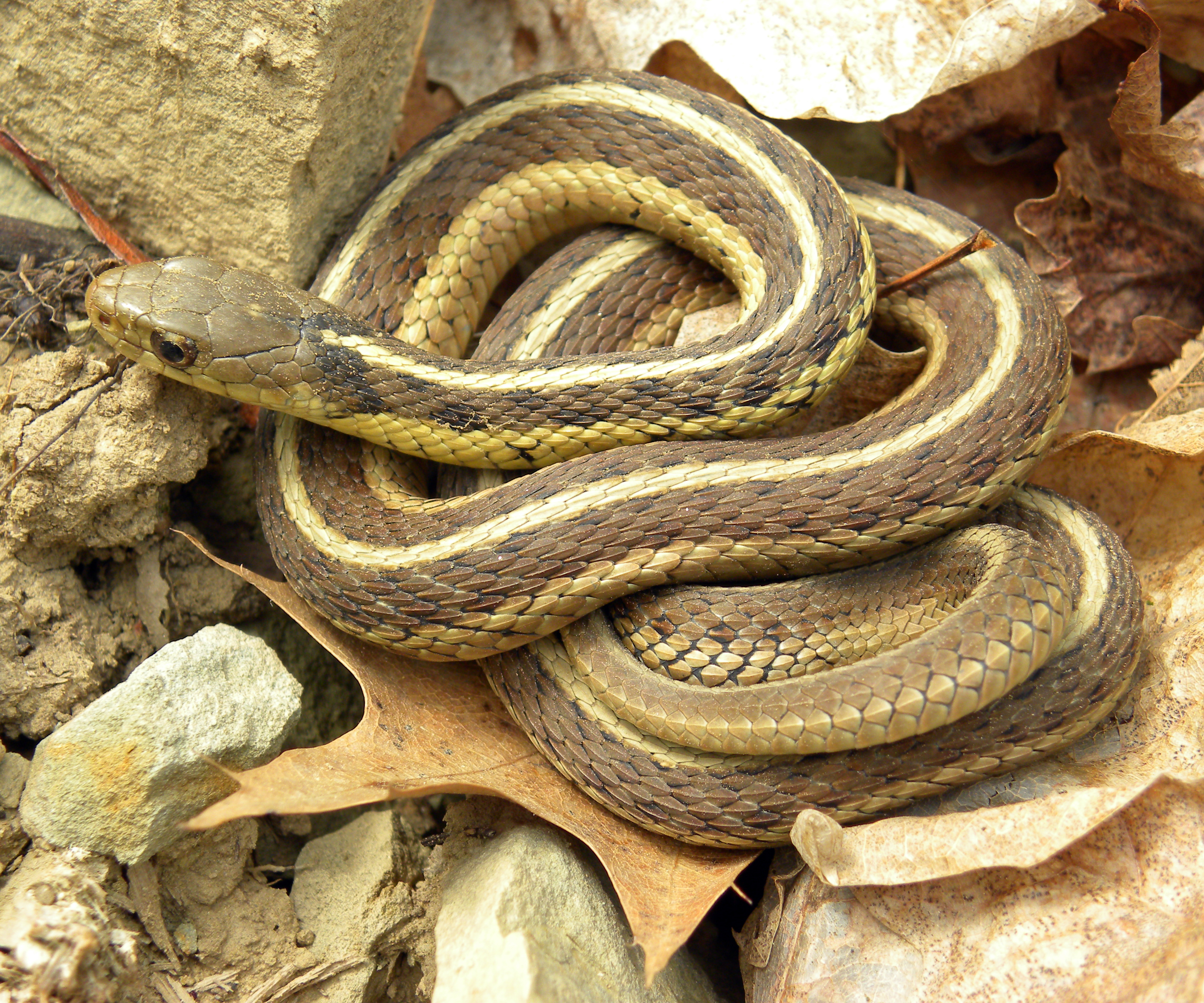
- Eastern gartersnake Thamnophis sirtalis sirtalis
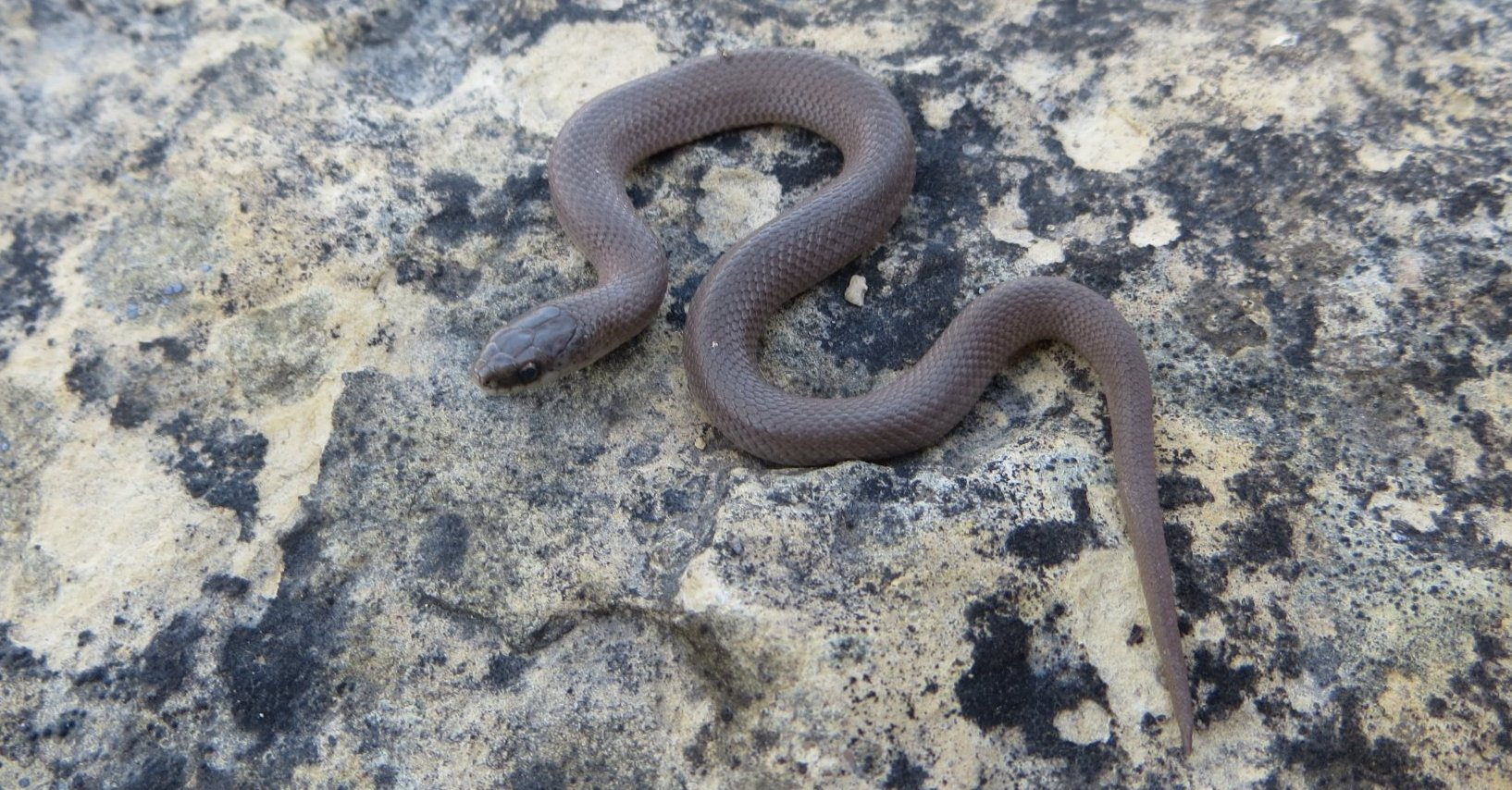
- Eastern smooth earthsnake Virginia valeriae valeriae
Family: Elapidae
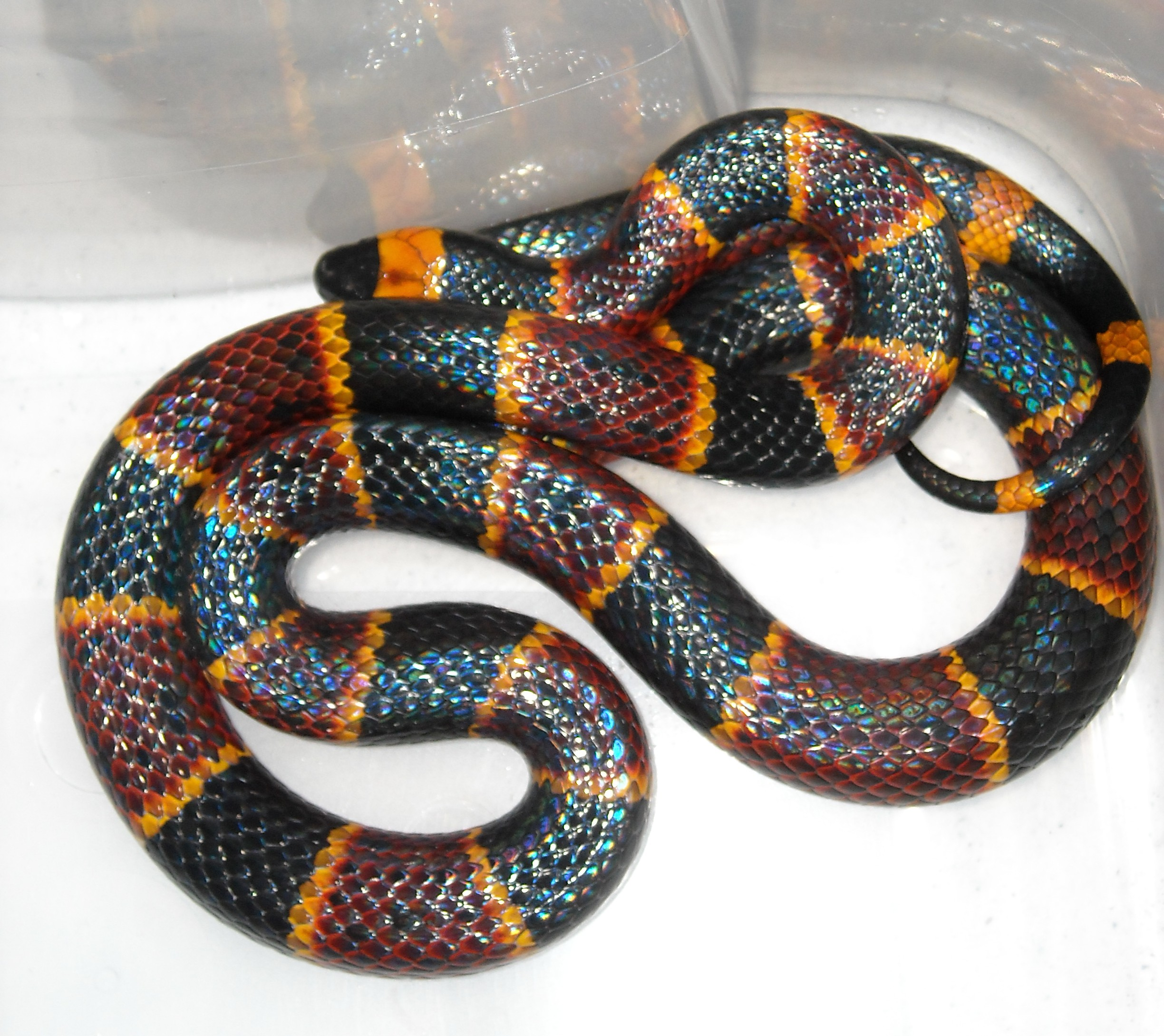
- Harlequin coralsnake Micrurus fulvius (V)
Family: Viperidae
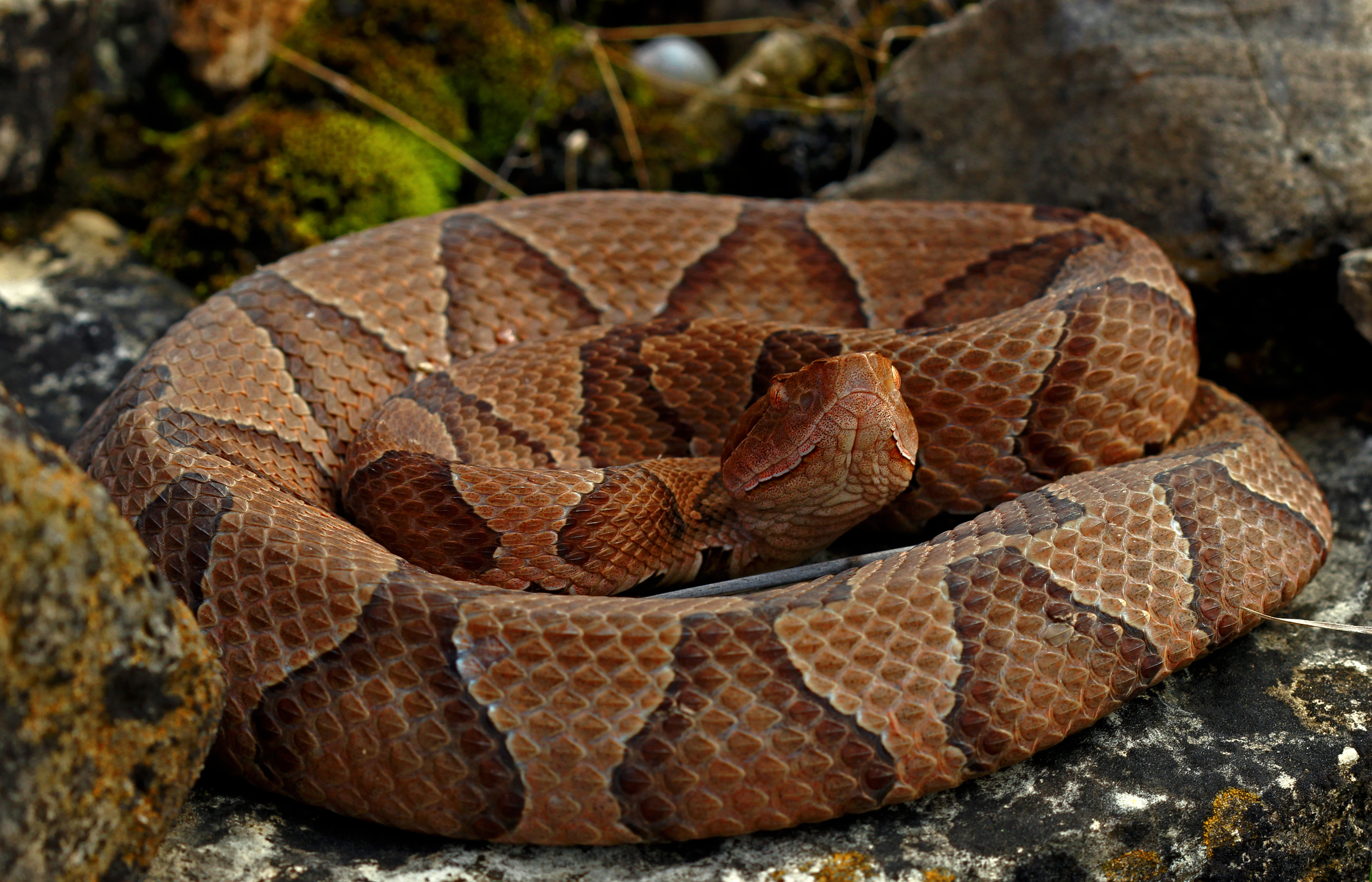
- Eastern copperhead Agkistrodon contortrix (V)
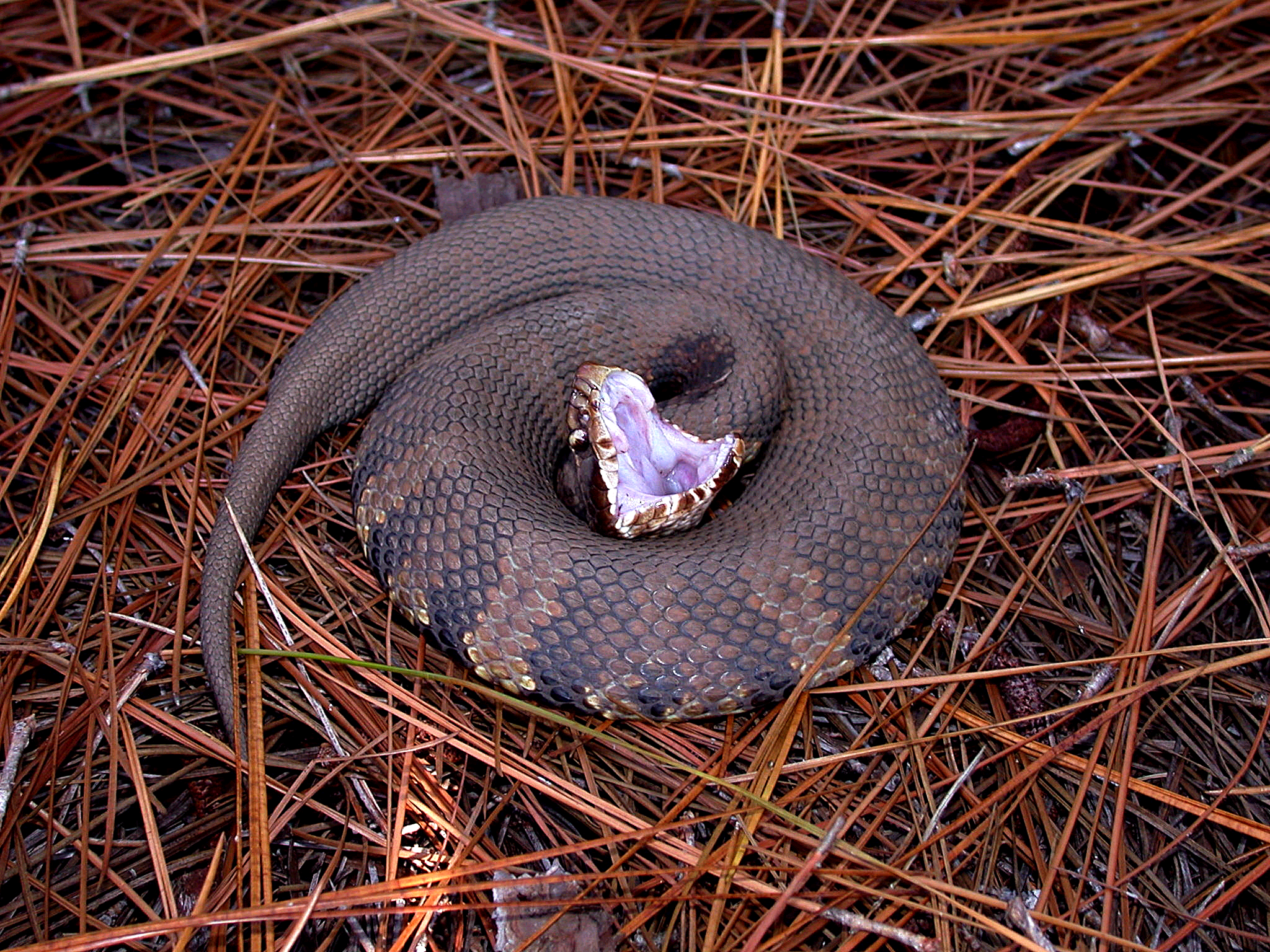
- Northern cottonmouth Agkistrodon piscivorus (V)
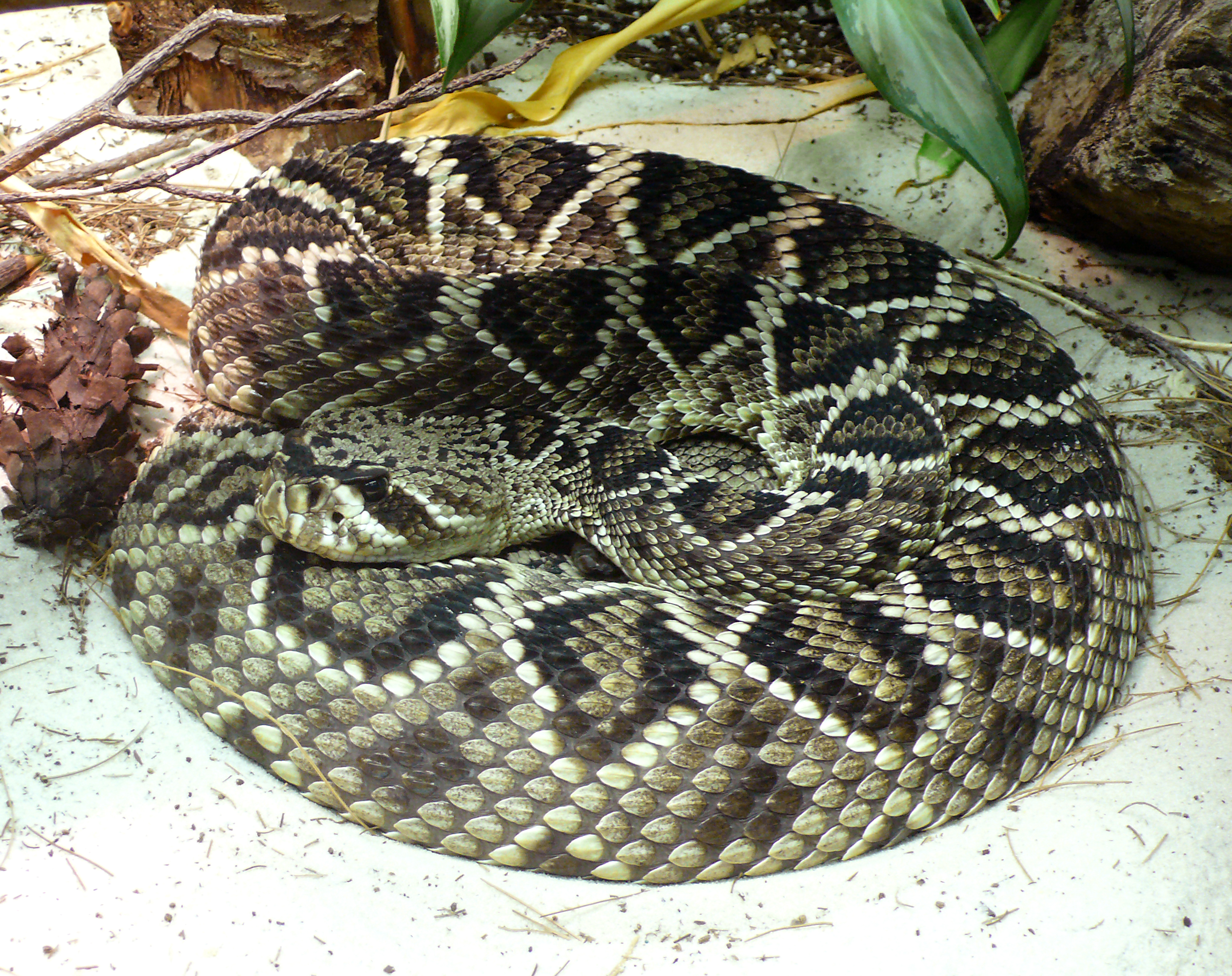
- Eastern diamond-backed rattlesnake Crotalus adamanteus (V)
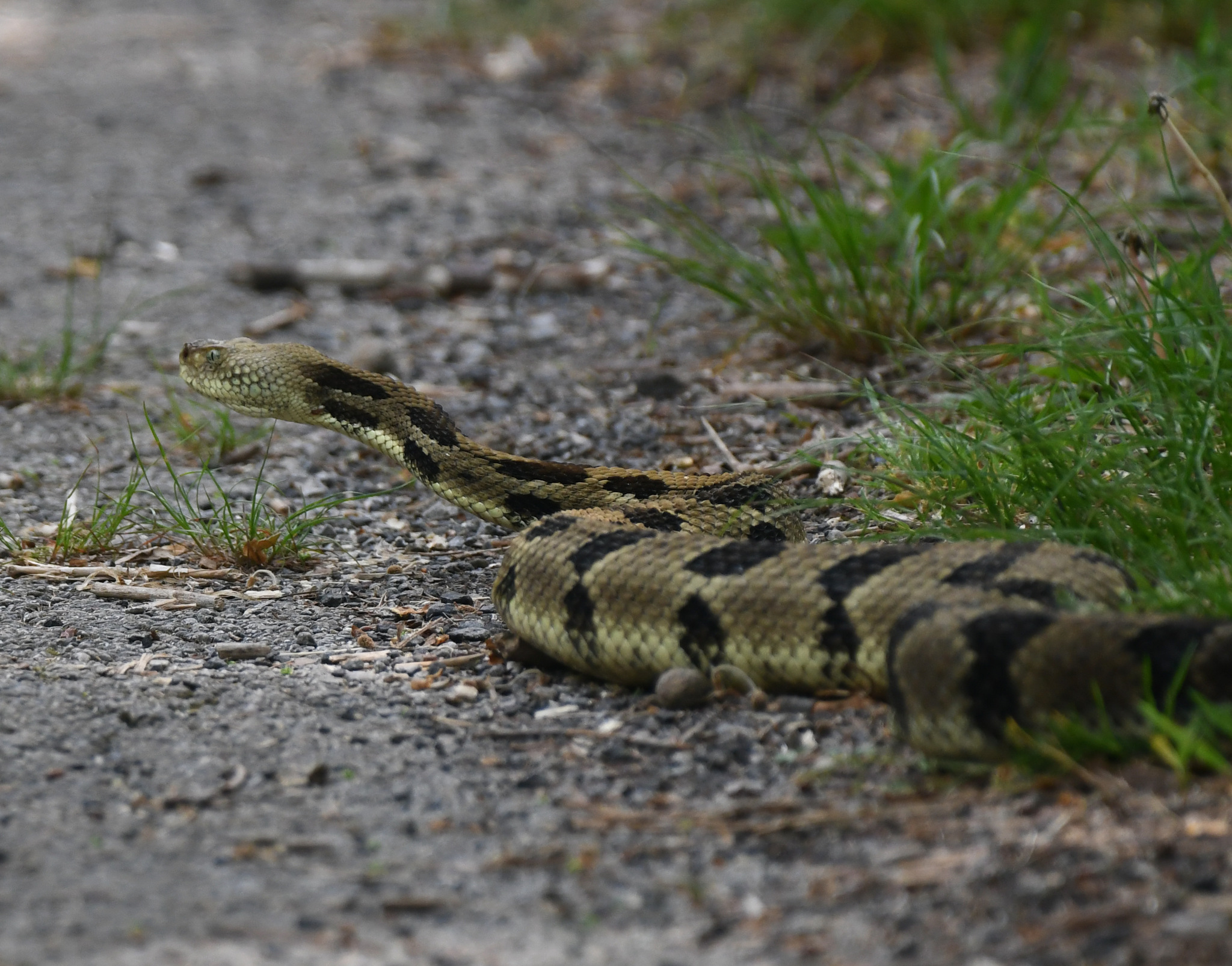
- Timber rattlesnake Crotalus horridus (V)
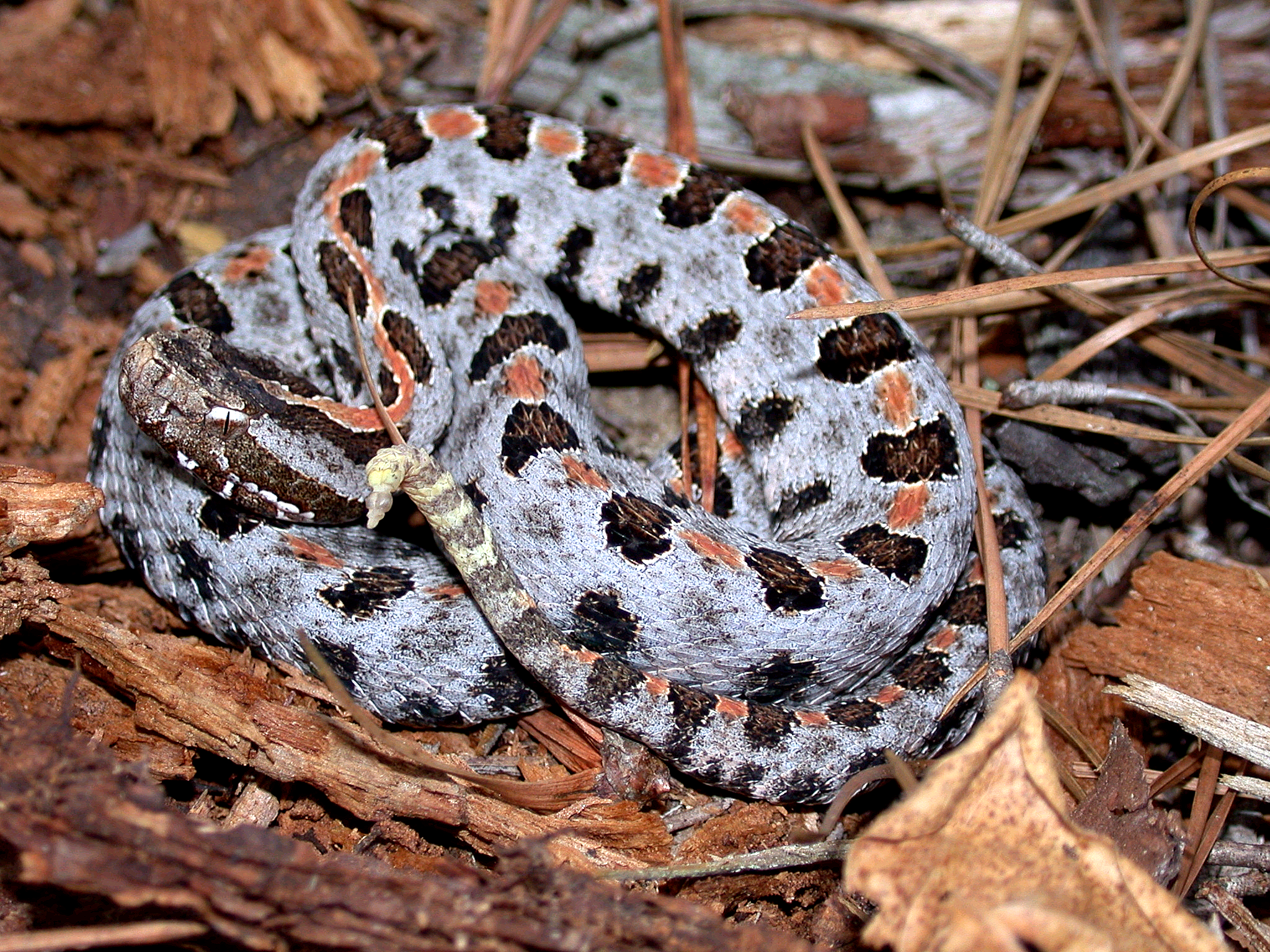
- Carolina pygmy rattlesnake Sistrurus miliarius miliarius (V)
