= Mapesu Private Game Reserve =

- Location within South Africa
- Location: Limpopo, South Africa
- Nearest city: Musina
- Coordinates: 22°15′S 29°12′E
- Area: 125 square kilometres (48 sq mi)
- Established: 2014
- Website: mapesu.com

Mapesu Private Game Reserve is a game reserve in Limpopo Province, South Africa. The reserve adjoins the Mapungubwe National Park and World Heritage Site, with which it shares a 12.5 km Northern border. The main entrance gate to the reserve is located approximately 7 km east of Mapungubwe's entrance gate. It was established in 2014 and covers an area of roughly 12,500 hectares. The reserve protects various bird, mammal and tree species and is slated to become part of the Greater Mapungubwe Transfrontier Conservation Area in phase 2 as part of the proposed Limpopo Valley Game Reserve.

== Flora and fauna ==
=== Vegetation ===
The numerous habitat types have resulted in high species diversity.

Mapesu Private Game Reserve falls within the Savanna bioregion and more specifically the Musina Mopane Bushveld vegetation type according to Mucina & Rutherford (2006). This vegetation type has also been classified as the Mopane Veld Type by Acocks (1953) and as Mopane Bushveld by Low & Rabelo (1996). Its distribution ranges between the Limpopo River and the Soutpansberg Mountain Range and from Baines Drif and Alldays in the west to Masisi and Tshipise in the east. This vegetation type is described by Mucina & Rutherford (2006) as undulating to very irregular plains with open woodland to moderately closed shrubland dominated by Colophospermum mopane on the clayey bottomlands and Combretum apiculatum on the hills. The areas with deep sandy soils are characterised by moderately open savanna, again dominated by Colophospermum mopane.

Vegetation types are further broken down into more specific plant or vegetation communities. Superficially the Mapesu vegetation seems to be homogenous, however the plant communities are in fact extremely multifarious as a result of the diverse geographical and soil character and the complex system of drainage lines that run through the property. After satellite images and aerial photographs of the area were examined, thorough investigation by road and foot revealed that Mapesu comprises 13 vegetation communities. These were classified on the basis of their dominant plant species, vegetation structure and obvious biophysical and geological features.

Apart from the dominant mopane vegetation other tree species also occur, these include the locally distributed vlei thorn, three hook thorn, num num, purple cluster leaf, fever trees, camel thorn, sweet thorn, shepherds tree, illala palm, apple leaf and lead wood amongst many others.

There are also some very large baobabs in the reserve, with one specimen having a circumference of 15 metres (49 ft).

=== Birds ===
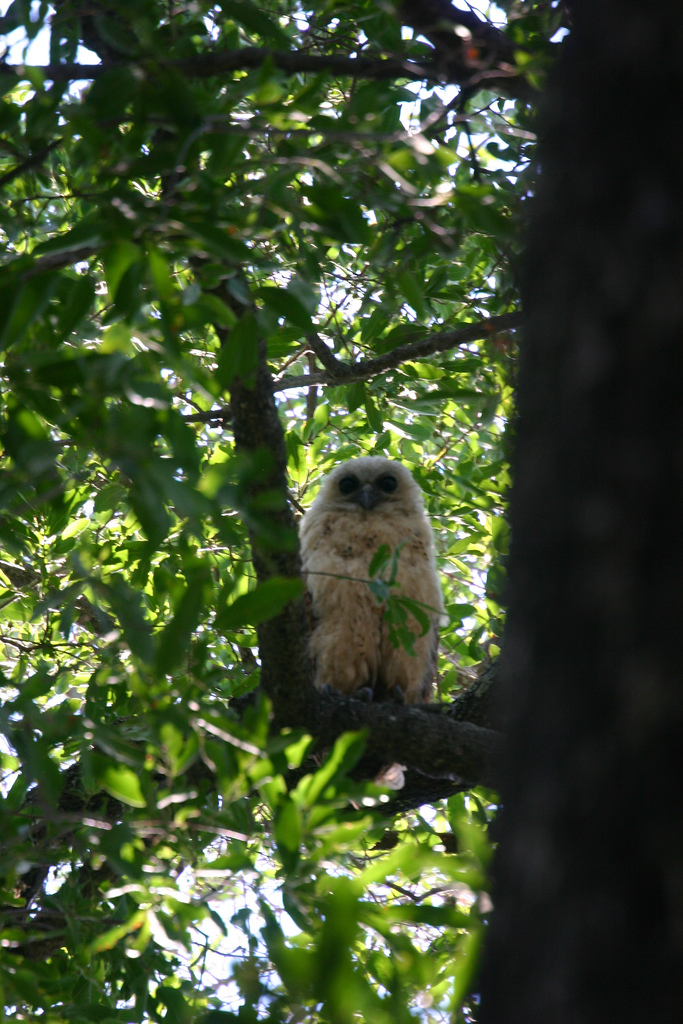
Pel's fishing owl

383 bird species have been recorded in Mapesu Private Game Reserve and over 433 species occur in the region.

There is a high density of African hawk-eagle in this undulating landscape and other raptors are also prominent.

Particularly enticing is an abundance of cuckoo species in summer with up to eleven species being found, including the Diederic cuckoo and Jacobin cuckoo.

Species typical of the arid western regions of the country (e.g. southern pied babbler, crimson-breasted shrike and black-faced waxbill) occur alongside species associated with the moister Lowveld habitat of the Kruger National Park.

The yellow-bellied greenbul, Meve's (long-tailed) starling, black-backed puffback and tropical boubou can be seen, and southern pied babbler and Natal spurfowl (francolin) are very vocal as are orange-breasted and grey-headed bush-shrikes and grey-backed camaroptera (bleating warbler).

Several species of owl including barn, African and white-faced scops, Verreaux's (giant) eagle, pearl-spotted and Pel's fishing owl occur in Mapesu Private Game Reserve.

As the Limpopo River serves as the southern boundary for many migrant species certain uncommon migrants to South Africa occur here. The influx of birds during the months of October till March is quite extraordinary.

A dam on the reserve plays host to many wetland birds including little bittern, knob-billed duck, black stork, woolly-necked stork, egyptian geese, white-faced whistling duck and Malachite kingfisher amongst others.

=== Mammals ===
The various ecotones on the reserve provide the prefect habitat for many mammal species including blue wildebeest, zebra, waterbuck, bushbuck, impala, eland, kudu, steenbok, duiker, klipspringer, oryx, giraffe, bush pig, warthog, vervet monkey, baboon, porcupine, civet, serval, caracal, honey badger, aardvark, spotted hyena, brown hyena and African leopard

Mapesu Private Game Reserve is a big 5 game reserve; elephant, cape buffalo, leopard, white rhino and lion can be spotted whilst on game drive with a qualified guide. The reserve introduced cheetah as part of the Endangered Wildlife Trust's cheetah metapopulation project in 2017 and aims to release African wild dog onto the reserve in 2019.

=== Reptiles ===
Several snake species currently occur on Mapesu Private Game Reserve including black mamba, puff adder, night adder, side-stripped sand snake, spotted bush snake, african python, Mozambique spitting cobra, snouted cobra, boomslang and horned adder.

Rock monitor lizard, water monitor lizard, giant plated lizard, rainbow skink, ground agama and speckled thick toed gecko have all been sighted in Mapesu Private Game Reserve.
