= Mapungubwe National Park =

National park in Limpopo, South Africa

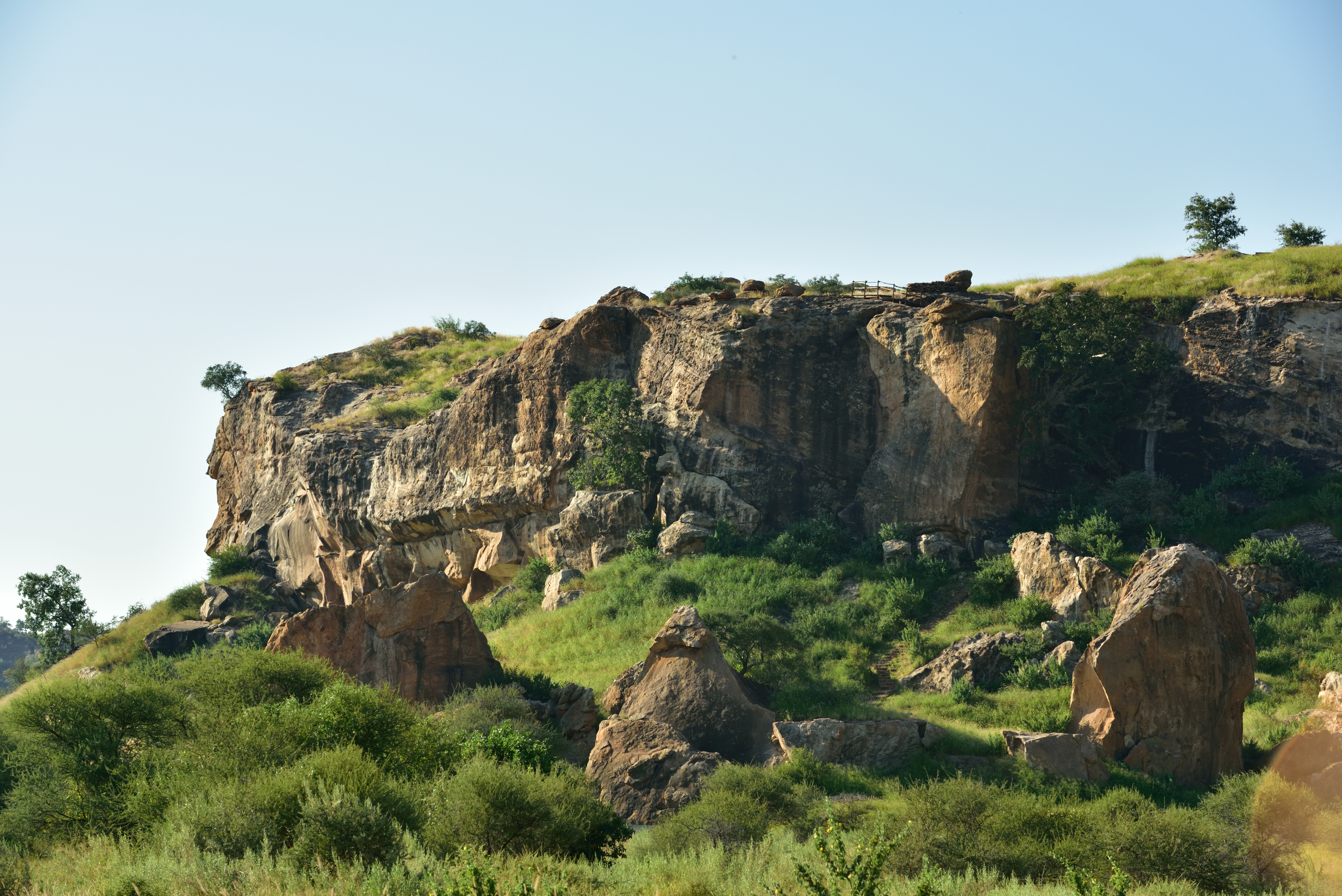
- Mapungubwe Hill
- Location of the park on the Limpopo border UNESCO Mapungubwe Cultural Landscape Mapungubwe National Park
- Location: Limpopo, South Africa
- Nearest city: Musina
- Coordinates: 22°15′S 29°12′E
- Area: 280 km^{2} (110 sq mi)
- Established: 1998 - Vhembe-Dongola National Park; 2004 - Mapungubwe National Park
- Governing body: South African National Parks
- World Heritage site: 2003
- Website: www.sanparks.org/parks/mapungubwe/
- Mapungubwe National Park (South Africa) Mapungubwe National Park (Limpopo)

Mapungubwe National Park is a national park in the Limpopo Province of South Africa. It forms part of the UNESCO Mapungubwe Cultural Landscape and the Greater Mapungubwe Transfrontier Conservation Area, abutting on the border with Botswana and Zimbabwe. It contains the historical site of Mapungubwe Hill, which was the site of a community dating back to the Iron Age and the capital of the Kingdom of Mapungubwe. Evidence has shown that it was a prosperous community. Archaeologists also uncovered the famous Golden Rhinoceros of Mapungubwe figurine from the site.

== History ==
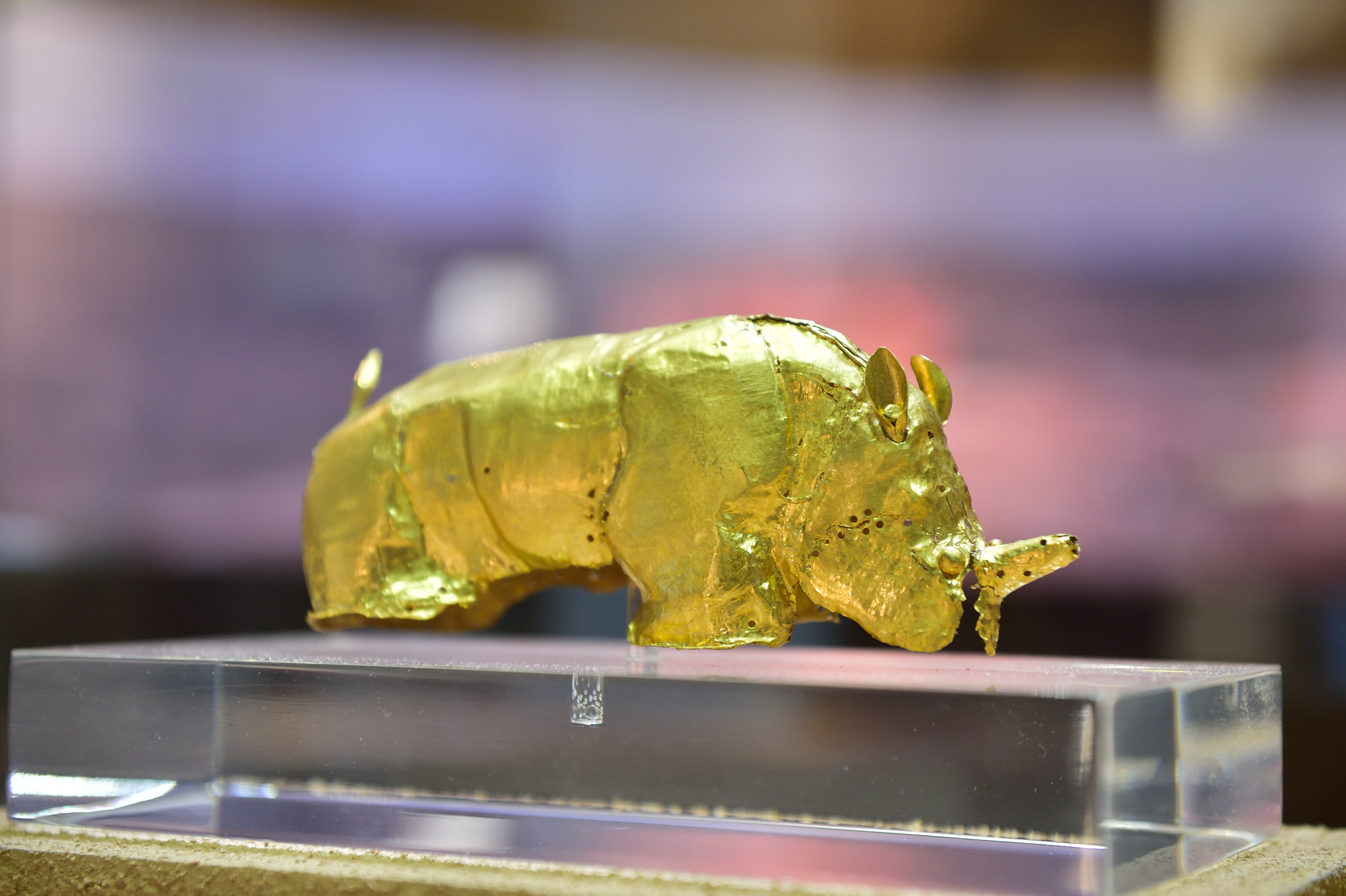
The Golden Rhinoceros of Mapungubwe found on Mapungubwe Hill

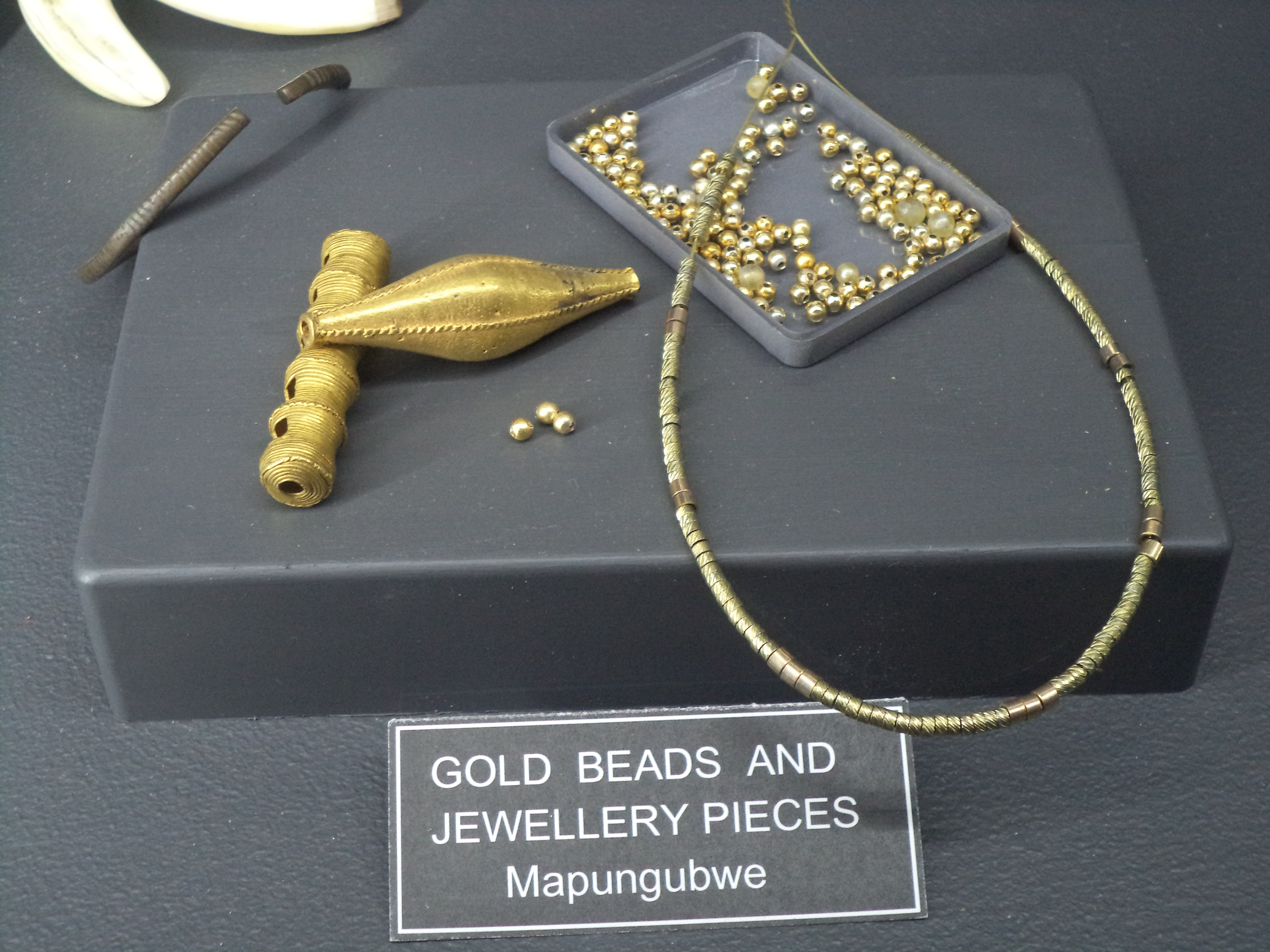
Mapungubwe gold beads and jewellery found in the park

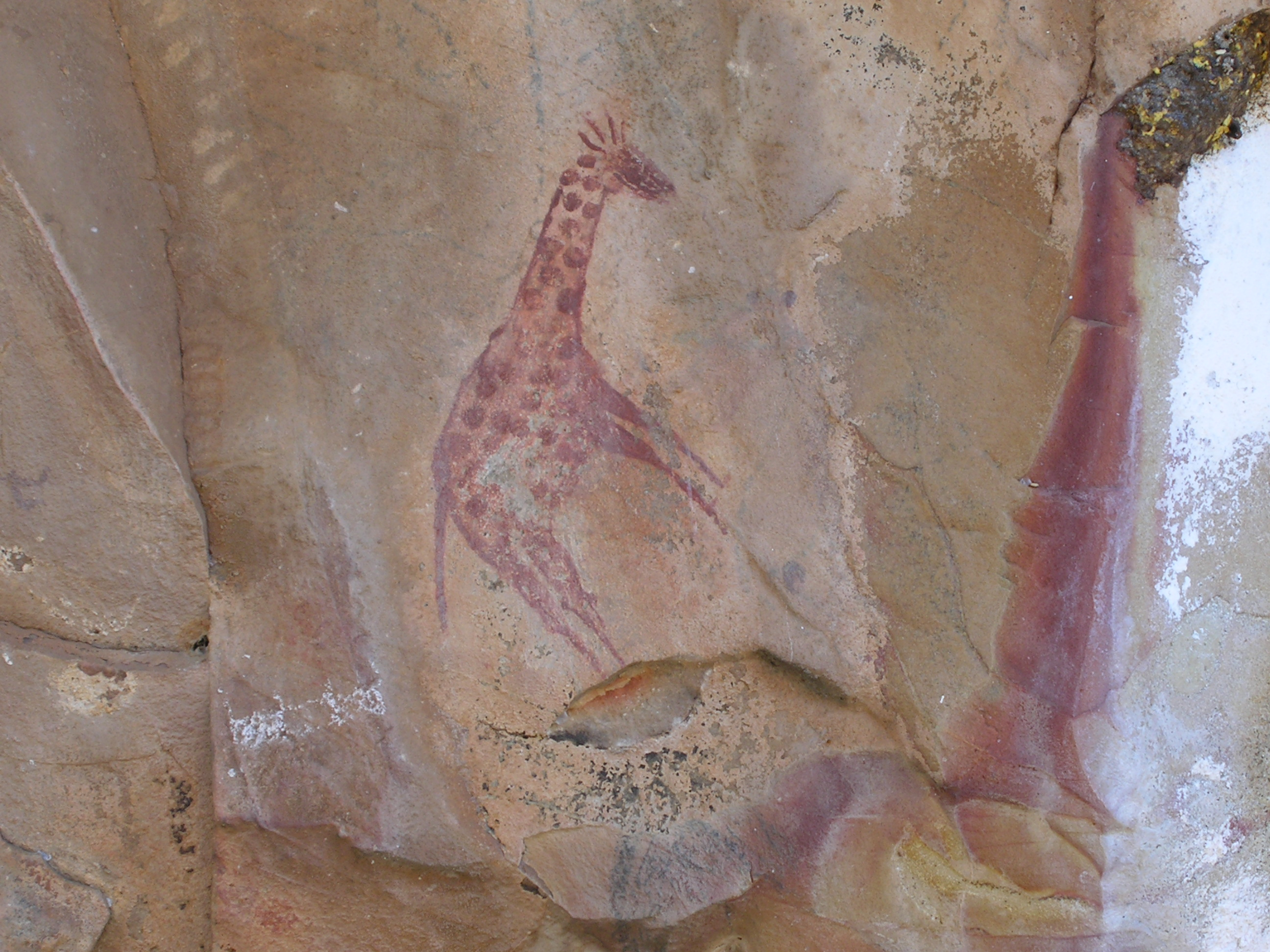
Rock art

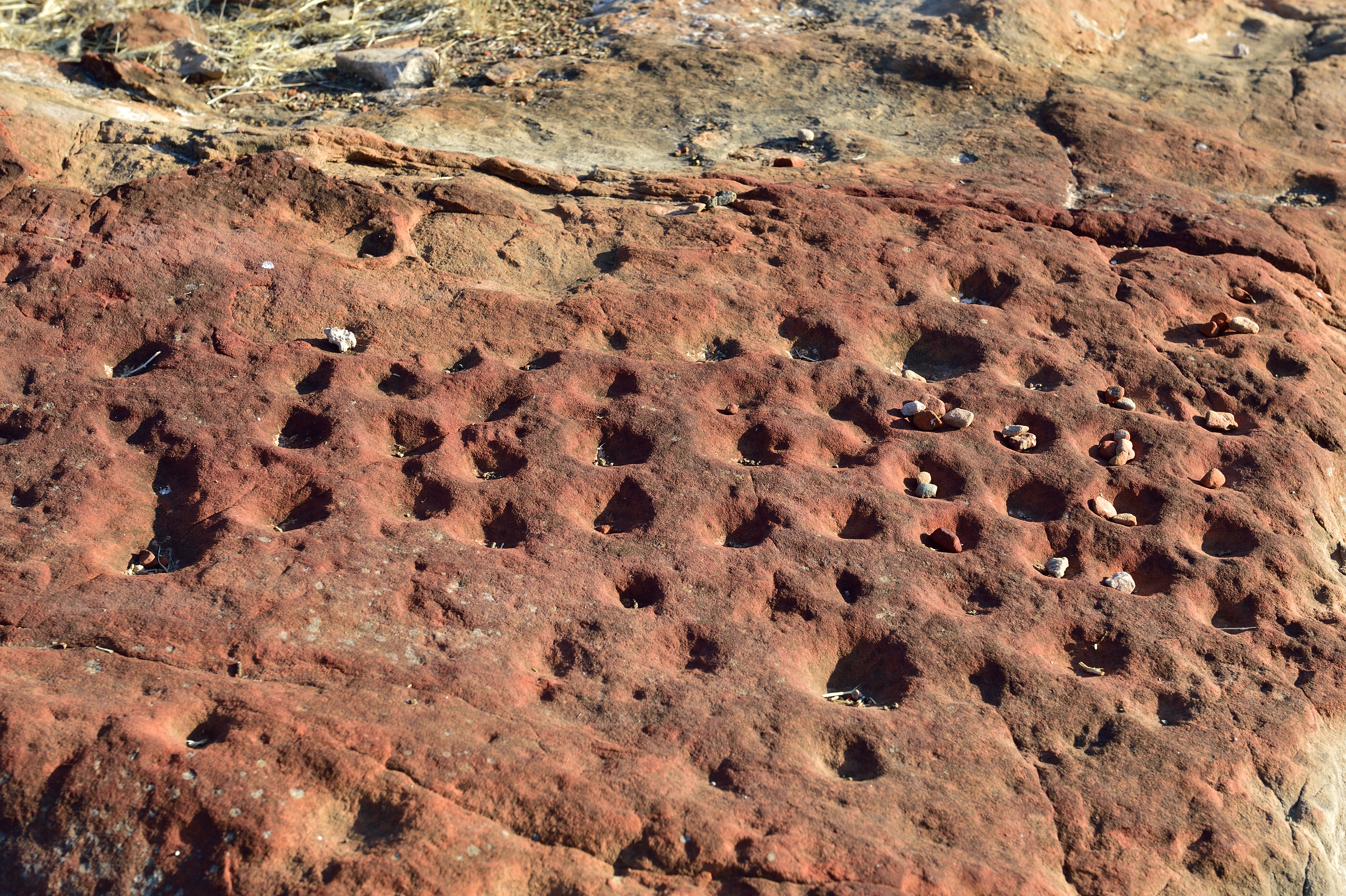
Stone game board on Mapungubwe Hill

The history of the Mapungubwe Cultural Landscape dates back 210 million years ago when one of the earliest plant-eating dinosaurs, Plateosauravus (Euskelosaurus), was known to have lived in the area.

The Mapungubwe area became a focus of agricultural research in the 1920s through the efforts of the botanist Illtyd Buller Pole-Evans. Pole-Evans was instrumental in the creation of the Botanical Survey Advisory Committee, which was tasked with coordinating botanical research throughout the Union of South Africa. One of the network of botanical and research stations set up by the Botanical Survey was situated in the Mapungubwe area. At the request of Jan Smuts, the government set aside a block of nine farms in this area as a preserve for wildlife and natural vegetation in 1918. A few years later this became known as the Dongola Botanical Reserve.

Pole-Evans set about expanding the Dongola Botanical Reserve. By the early 1940s, the reserve had grown to include 27 farms, including Greefswald, the property on which the Mapungubwe Hill is situated. Pole-Evans lobbied to have the reserve proclaimed as a national park, with the support of Prime Minister Smuts. In 1944, Minister of Lands Andrew Conroy proposed the formation of the Dongola Wild Life Sanctuary, which would include 124 farms, 86 of which were privately owned. This proposal was strongly opposed by the National Party, then the official opposition in parliament and the National Parks Board of Trustees. In one of the longest running debates in the history of the South African parliament, supporters argued that it was necessary to conserve the country's natural assets, that the land set aside for the proposed reserve was unsuitable for agricultural purposes and that the area had a rich archaeology which should be protected. Those opposed to the establishment of the reserve argued that it was unacceptable to alienate agricultural land for wildlife conservation, to expropriate private land or to evict people from land they had occupied for generations. The debate, which has become known as the "Battle of Dongola", resulted in the declaration of a much reduced area as the Dongola Wildlife Sanctuary, after members of the ruling United Party voted in favour of the proposal. The National Party won the elections in 1948, and the sanctuary was abolished in 1949. Expropriated farms were returned to their original farmers, farms owned by the state were allocated for resettlement and funds returned to donors.

In 1967, another proposal to protect the area was initiated and the Vhembe Nature Reserve, comprising three farms, including Greefswald, was established as a Transvaal provincial reserve.

In 1993, De Beers Consolidated Mines, which had established the Venetia Limpopo Nature Reserve on land that adjoins Greefswald, called for the area to be declared a national park. In 1995 the South African National Parks Board and the Limpopo provincial government signed an agreement committing themselves to the establishment of the new national park. The Vhembe-Dongola National Park was proclaimed on 9 April 1998.

The Vhembe-Dongola National Park was renamed Mapungubwe National Park and opened officially on Heritage Day, 24 September 2004. In the 21st century, Mapungubwe has been embraced as a site of significance by South Africans and the international community. The Mapungubwe National Park was declared in 1998. The Mapungubwe Cultural Landscape was declared as a National Heritage Site in 2001 and it was inscribed on the World Heritage List in 2003.

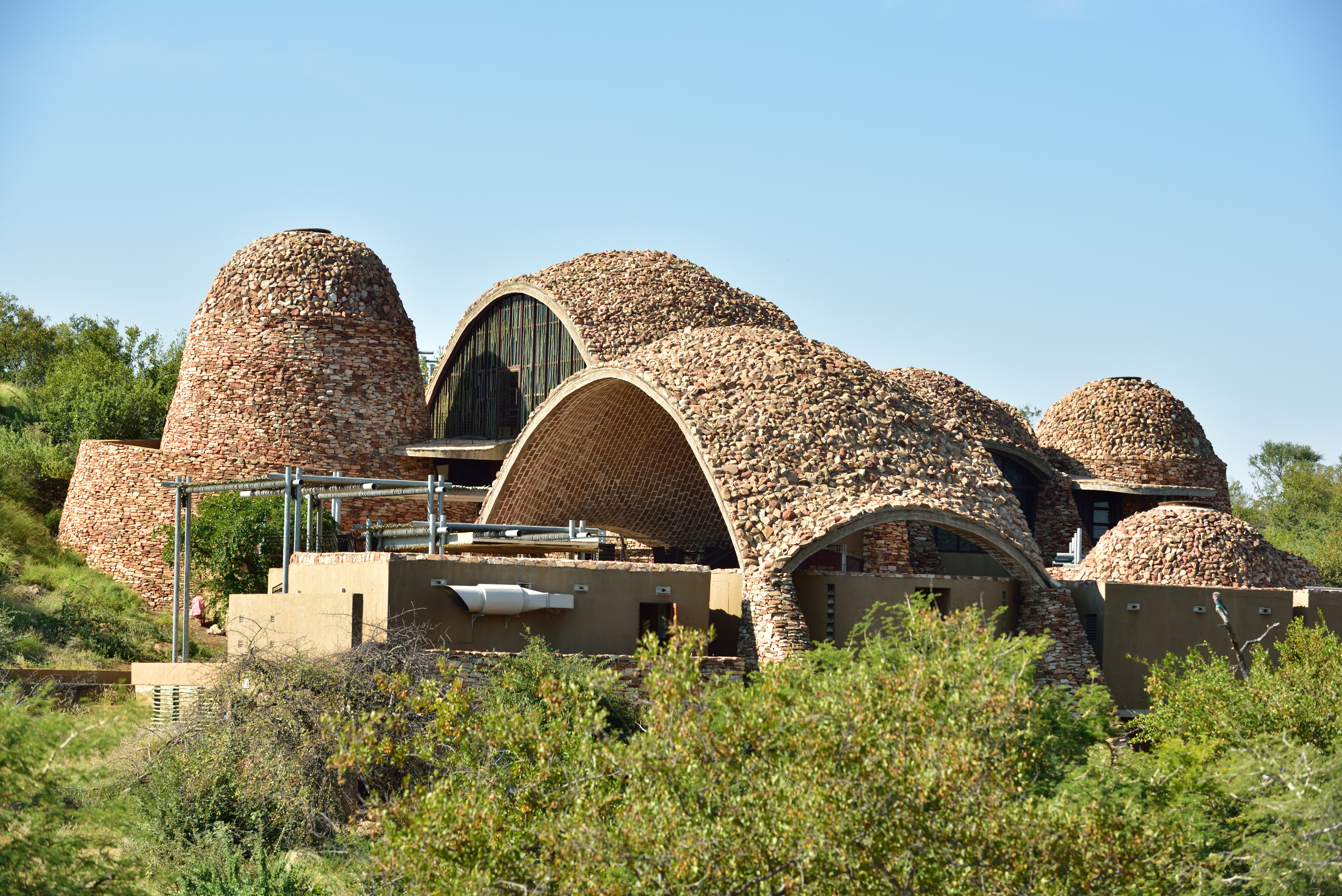
The Museum and Interpretive Centre houses artefacts from Mapungubwe. In 2009, the building won the World Architecture Festival's World Building of the Year

With the park's UNESCO World Heritage status, a building has been constructed that houses a museum section with many of the artefacts uncovered in the park on display. Information on the park's history and biology is also available at the Museum and Interpretive Centre. In 2009, the building won the World Architecture Festival's World Building of the Year.

== Flora and fauna ==
=== Vegetation ===
The numerous habitat types have resulted in high species diversity.

There are at least 24 Acacia species and 8 Commiphora species, amongst others. Other vegetation of the area is a typically short fairly dense growth of shrubby Mopane trees, generally associated with a number of other trees and shrubs and a somewhat sparse and tufted grassveld. The riparian fringe of the Limpopo is of prime importance from the point of view of conservation. It is a dense vegetation community with a closed canopy which occurs in the rich alluvial deposits along the river.

The most striking trees in this community fever trees, ana trees, leadwoods, fig trees and acacias. Extensive patches of this vegetation have been cleared for cultivation elsewhere along the length of the Limpopo River. The Limpopo floodplain has allowed some trees to grow to massive sizes. Nyala berry trees and ana trees can get particularly big.

There are also some very large baobabs in the park, with one specimen having a circumference of 31 metres (102 ft).

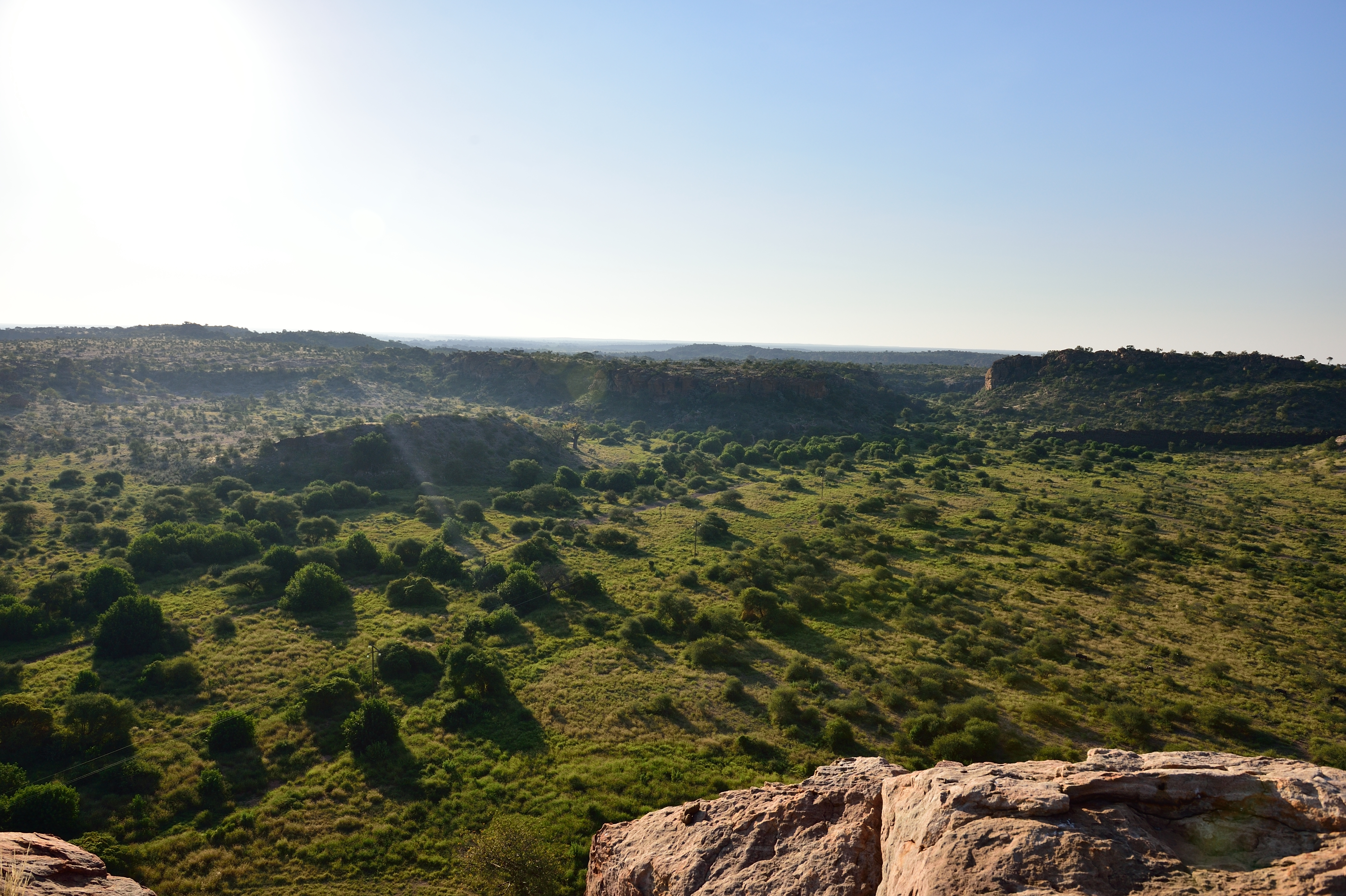
Landscape

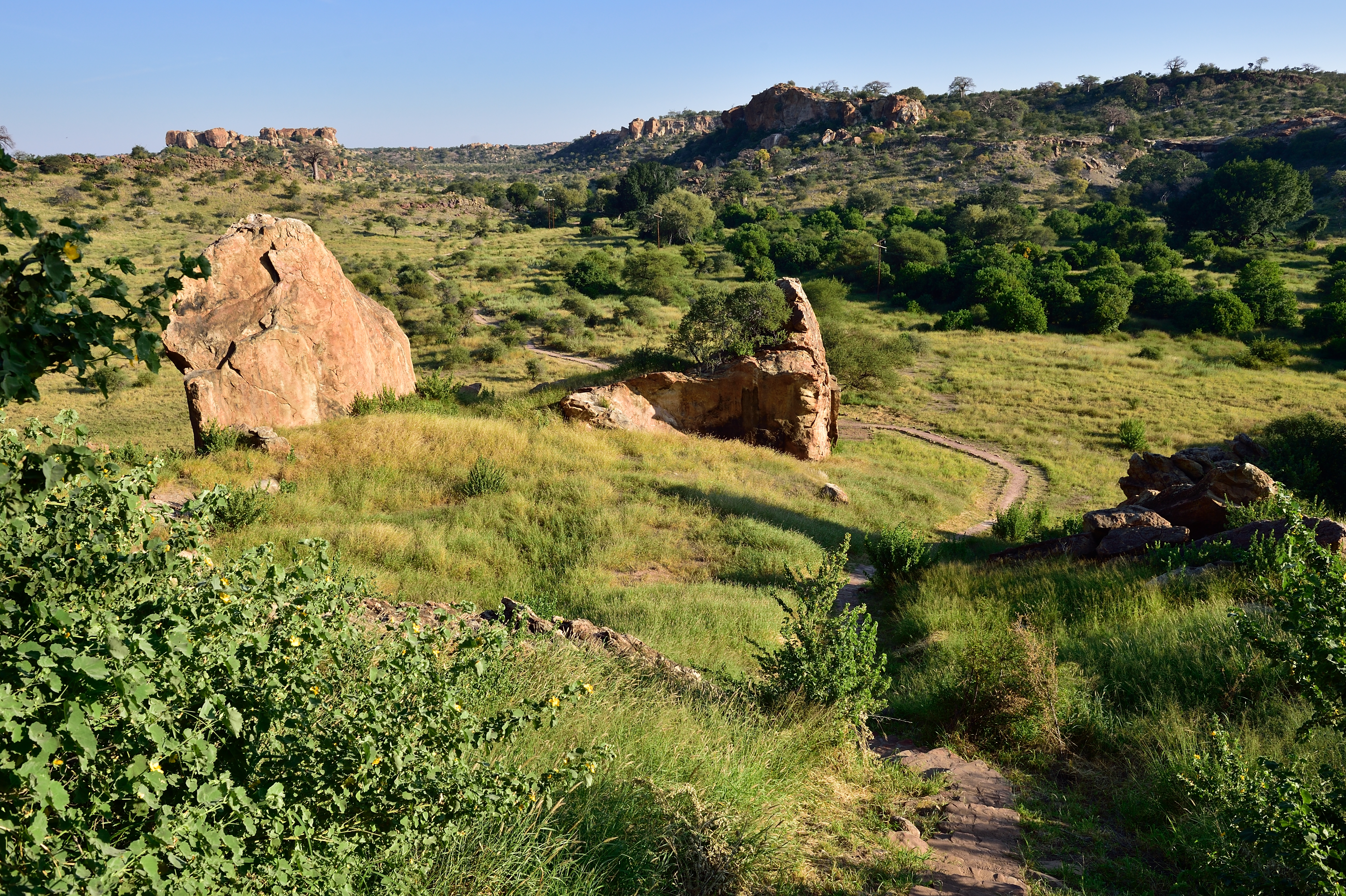
Walking trail

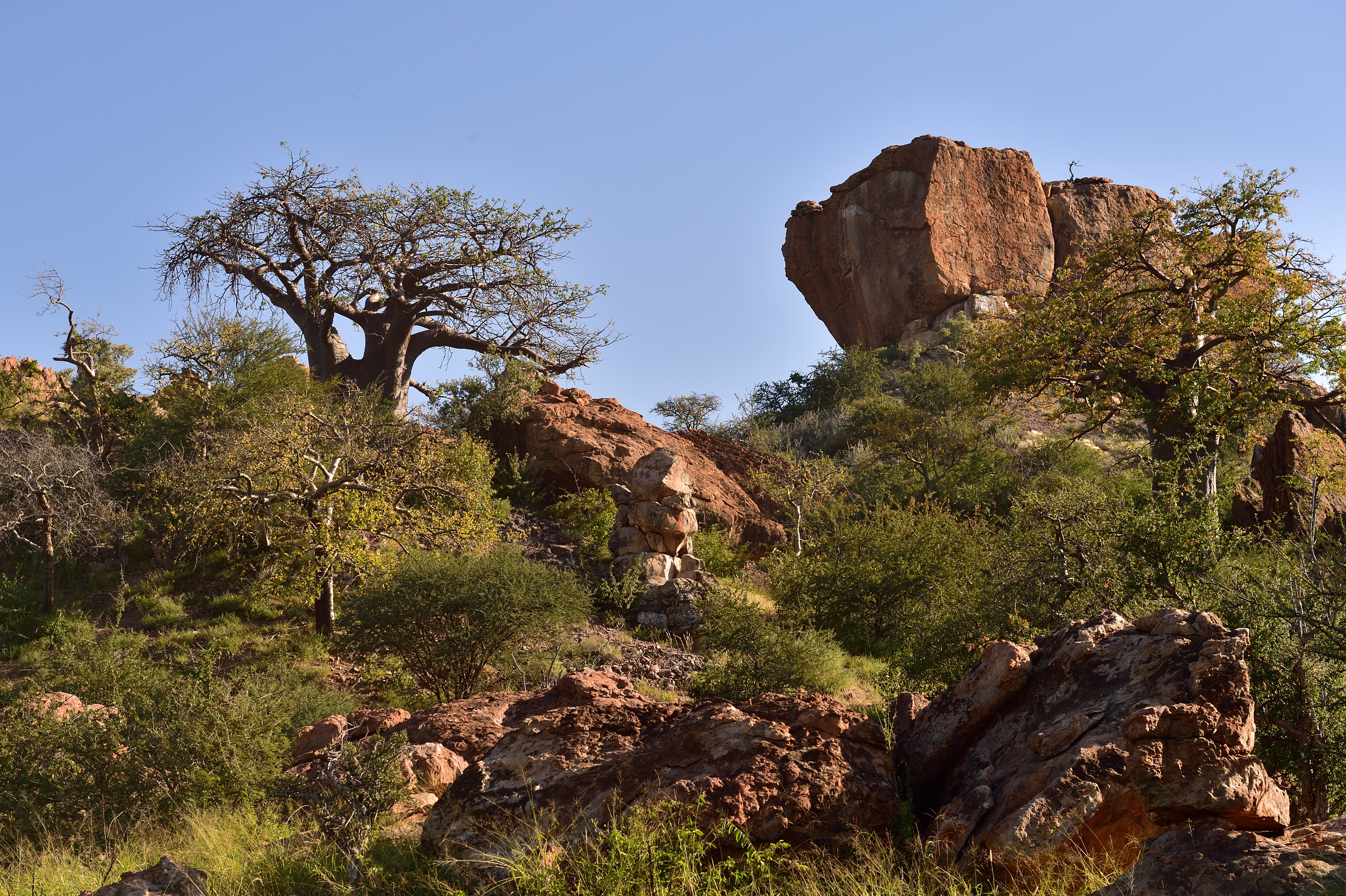
Baobab trees on Mapungubwe Hill

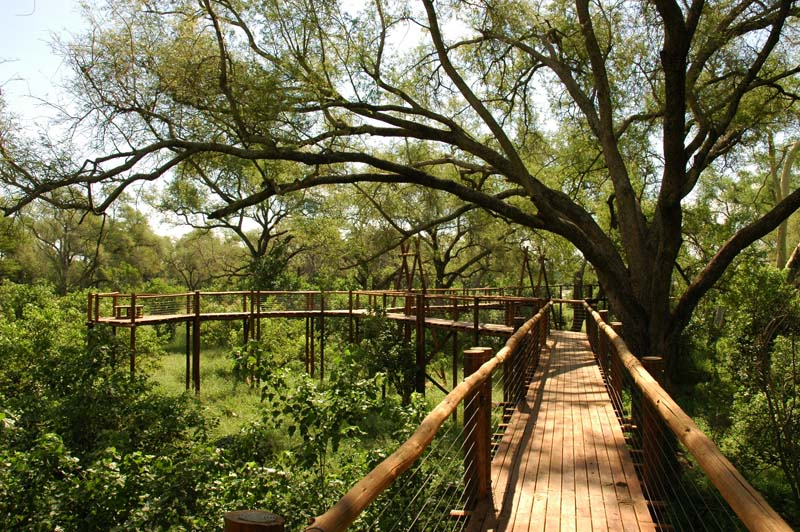
Treetop walk

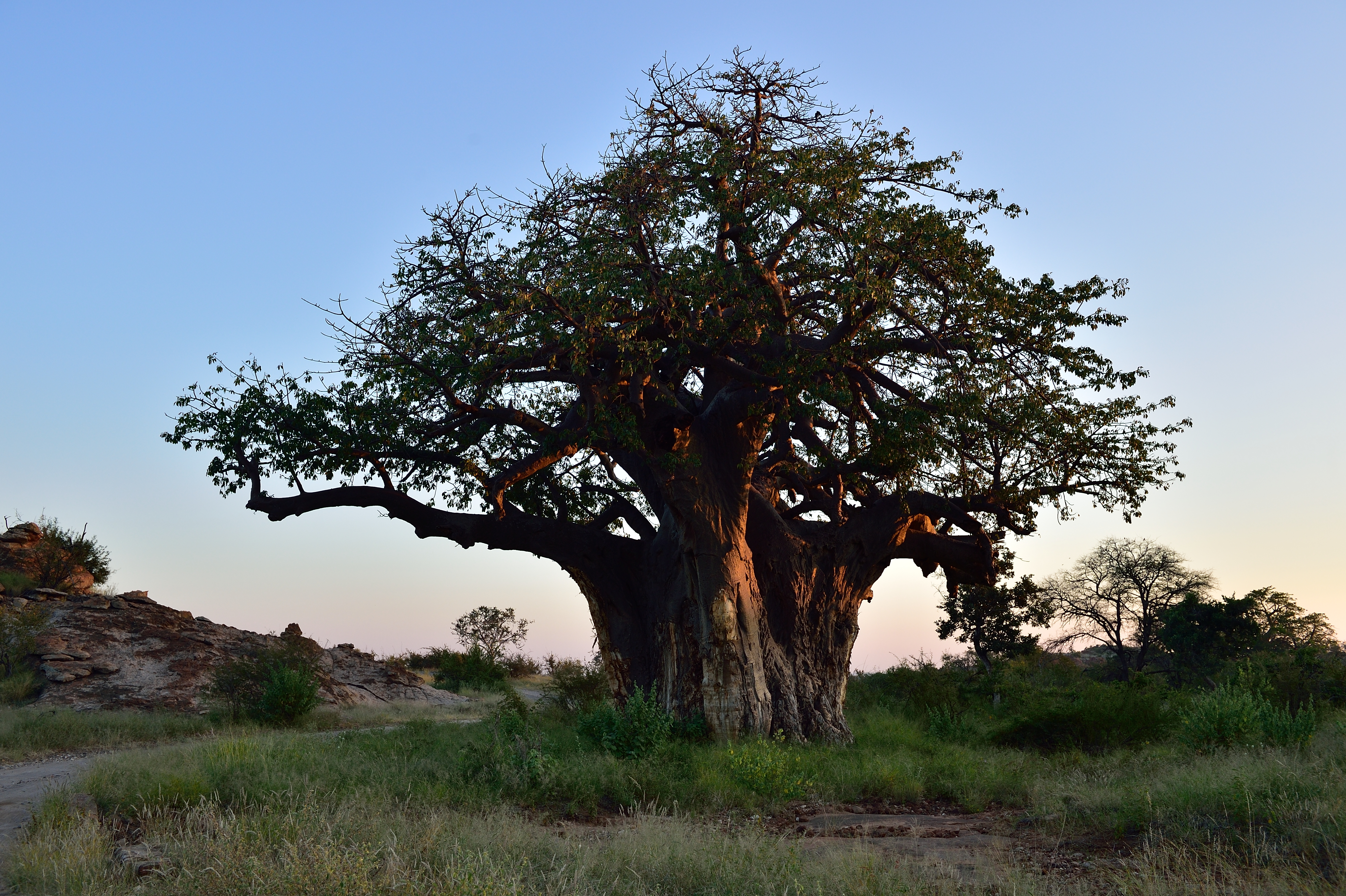
Baobab in the park

=== Birds ===
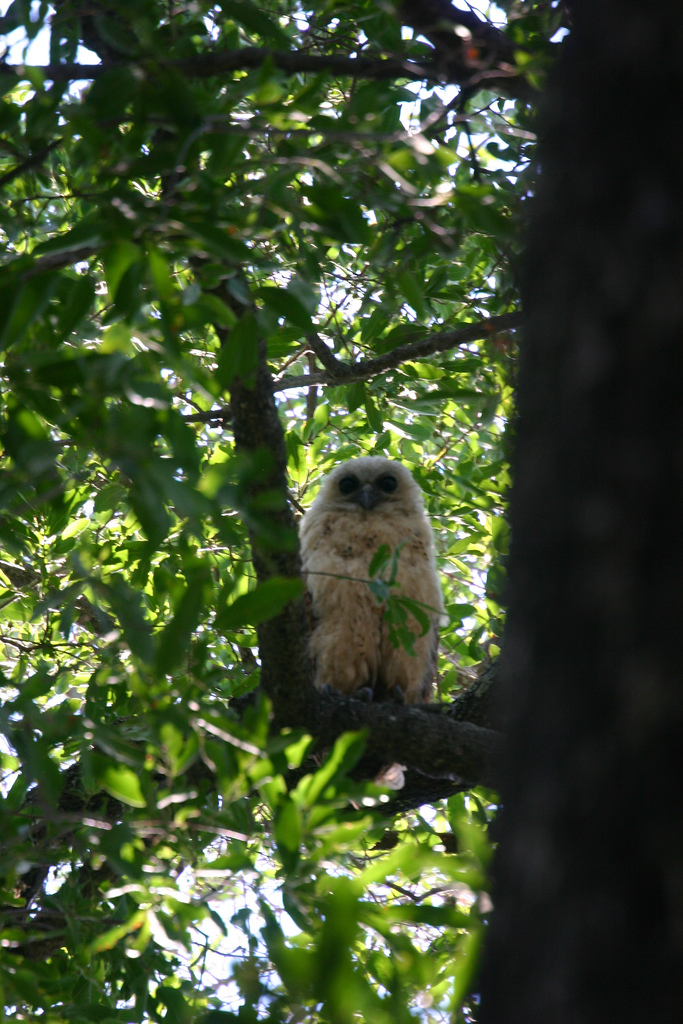
Pel's fishing owl

387 bird species have been recorded in Mapungubwe National Park, including Verreaux's eagle, southern pied babbler, crimson-breasted shrike and black-faced waxbill, Meyer's parrot, White-crested helmetshrike, Meves's starling and some flycatcher species, yellow-bellied greenbul, black-backed puffback, orange-breasted bushshrike and grey-headed bushshrike, grey-backed camaroptera and Natal spurfowl, western barn owl, African scops owl, Southern white-faced owl, Verreaux's eagle-owl, Pel's fishing owl, pearl-spotted owlet, Kori bustard, chestnut-backed sparrow-larks and wattled starling, Temminck's courser, collared palm thrush and ground hornbill, great white pelican, white-backed night heron, bat hawk, augur buzzard, African hobby, Dickinson's kestrel, green sandpiper, three-banded courser, blue-spotted wood dove, Brown-necked parrot, Senegal coucal, pennant-winged nightjar, blue-cheeked bee-eater, broad-billed roller, racket-tailed roller, African golden oriole and olive-tree warbler.

The Limpopo floodplain harbours grey crowned crane, up to seven stork species and several wader, heron, crake and duck species.

=== Mammals ===
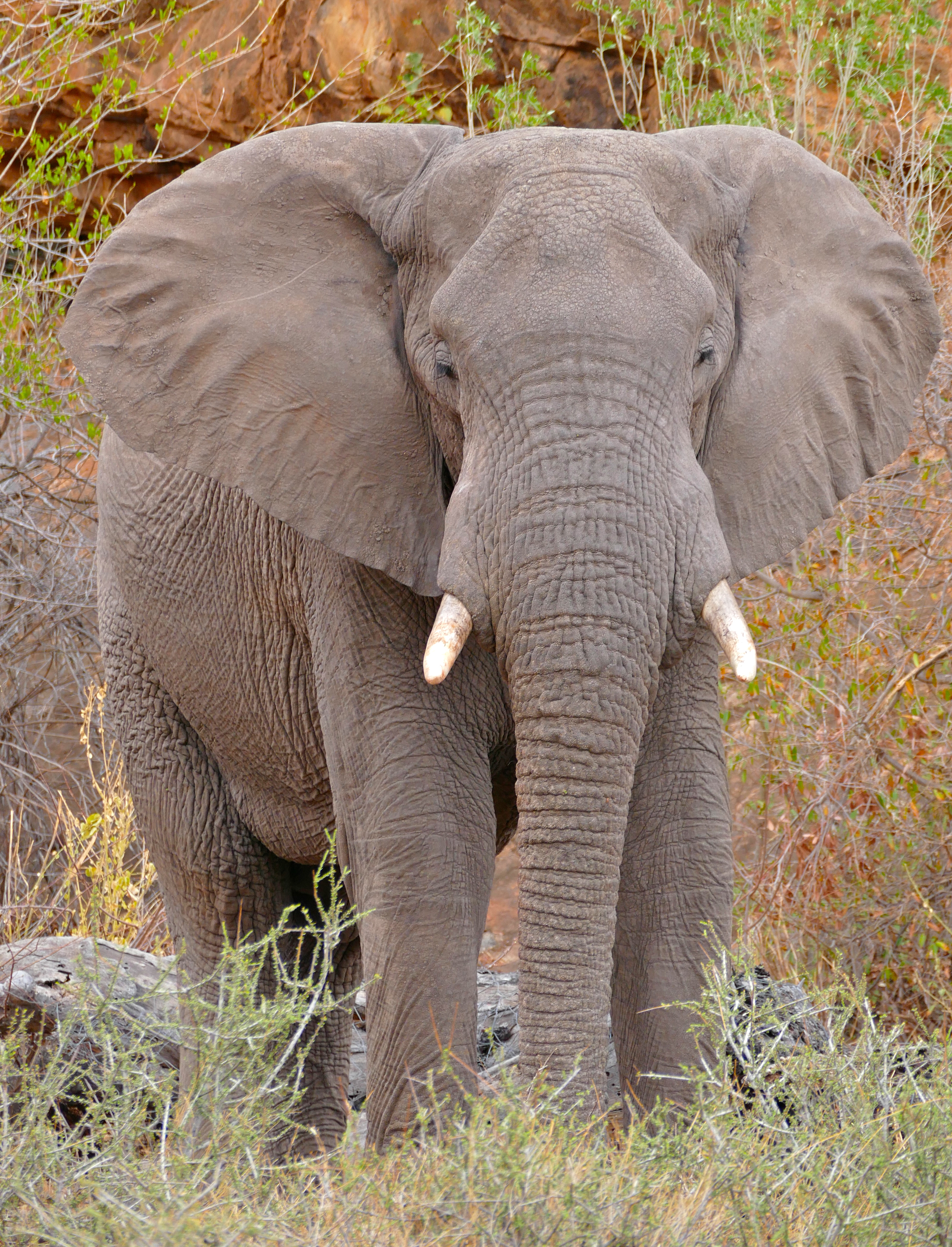
African Elephant bull

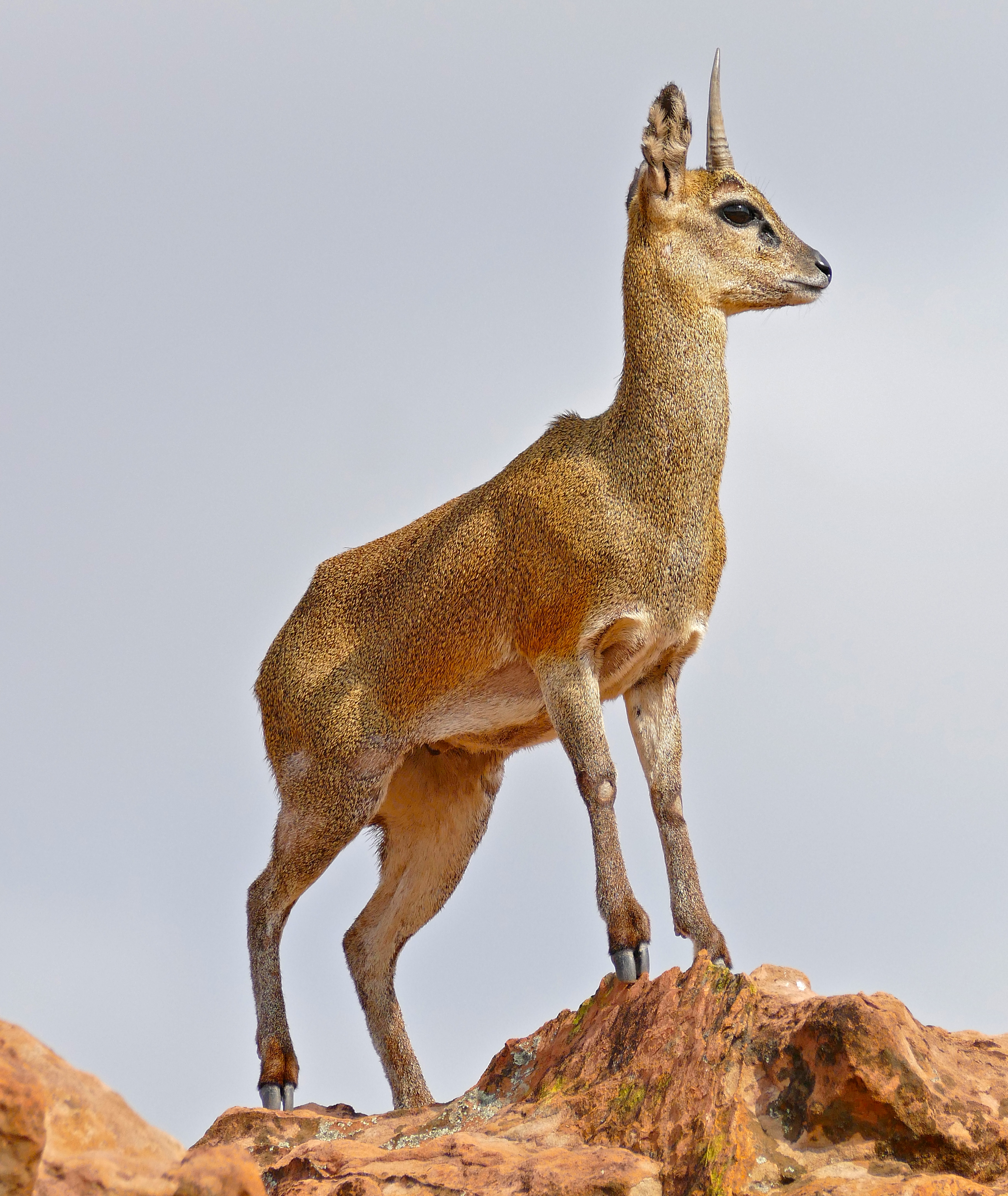
Male Klipspringer

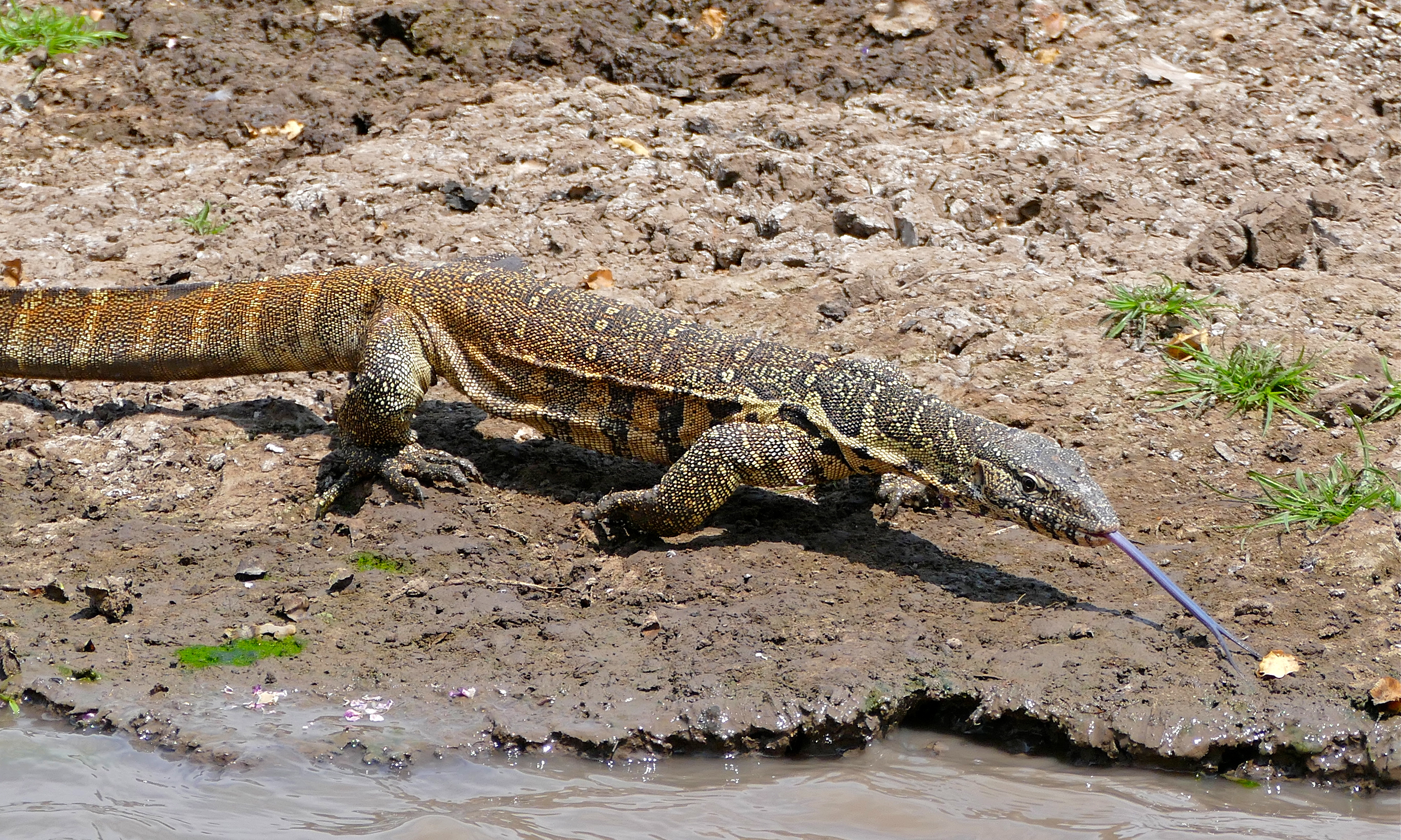
Nile monitor

Since 2005, Mapungubwe National Park is considered a Lion Conservation Unit together with South Luangwa National Park. Other species include African bush elephant, hippopotamus, southern white rhinoceros, African leopard, South African cheetah, African wild dog, spotted hyena, brown hyena, common eland, blue wildebeest, kudu, Burchell's zebra, bushbuck, waterbuck, impala, klipspringer, duiker, steenbok, red hartebeest, oryx, South African giraffe, common warthog, bush pig, aardvark and baboon, African civet, crested porcupine, caracal and vervet monkey. At least 17 bat species have been recorded, including tree roosting Wahlberg's epauletted fruit bat and the cave dwelling Egyptian fruit bat.

=== Reptiles ===
Monitor lizard, Nile monitor, giant plated lizard, Trachylepis margaritifera, ground agama and speckled thick toed gecko have all been seen in Mapungubwe National Park. There are estimated to be at least 32 snake species, although only 15 have thus far been confirmed. Some of these species include the southern African python, snouted cobra, black mamba, both horned and puff adders, and at least three species of whip or sand snakes. Nile crocodile occur in and along the Limpopo River.

== Threats ==
The status of the park as part of the Greater Mapungubwe Transfrontier Conservation Area is severely threatened by the planned exploitation of coal reserves in the immediate vicinity of the reserve. An open-cast coal mine and power plant are planned in the buffer zone of the national park, which threaten its natural and cultural value.. In addition, the large amount of water required for the mining activities will impact the ecology of a large part of the region.

== See also ==
- Kingdom of Mapungubwe
- Mapungubwe Collection
