= Greater Mapungubwe Transfrontier Conservation Area =

Transfrontier conservation area in South Africa, Botswana and Zimbabwe

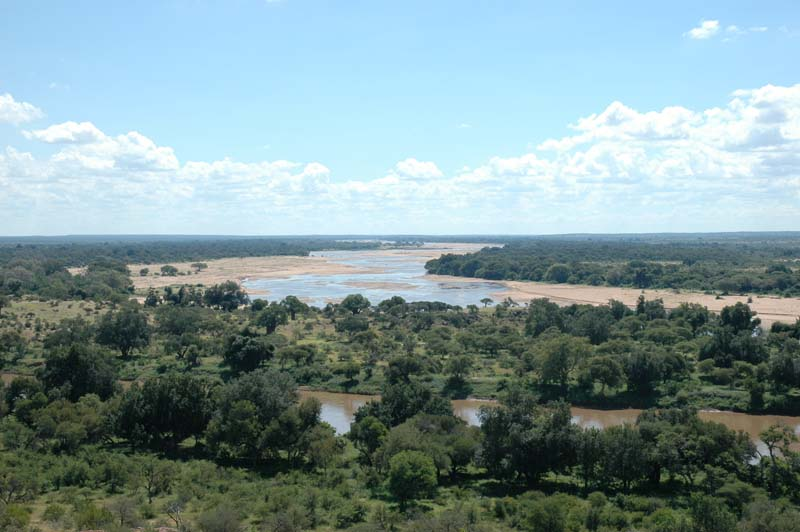
- Confluence of the Shashe and Limpopo Rivers
- Interactive map of Greater Mapungubwe Transfrontier Conservation Area
- Location: Southern Africa
- Coordinates: 22°08′S 29°12′E
- Area: 4,872 km^{2} (1,881 sq mi)

Greater Mapungubwe Transfrontier Conservation Area (GMTFCA) is a cultural Transfrontier Conservation Area (TFCA), formerly known as the Limpopo–Shashe Transfrontier Conservation Area.

== History ==
=== Establishment ===
With the assistance of the Peace Parks Foundation, De Beers, the National Parks Trust and WWF-SA, SANParks consolidated the core area of South Africa's contribution to the proposed TFCA. In July 2003 the Mapungubwe Cultural Landscape was proclaimed a UNESCO World Heritage Site. Mapungubwe National Park was officially opened on 24 September 2004. A memorandum of understanding on the TFCA's establishment was signed on 22 June 2006 and an international coordinator was appointed. On 19 June 2009, the Limpopo/Shashe TFCA was renamed to the Greater Mapungubwe Transfrontier Conservation Area.

In 2012 archaeological discoveries were made on the farm Klein Bolayi, east of Mapungubwe National Park, confirming that the Mapungubwe Cultural Landscape extends eastwards or downstream along the Limpopo Valley, and corroborating human habitation in the area for more than 1 500 years.

The Greater Mapungubwe trans frontier conservation area, which is presently being developed will cover an area of 4 872 km^{2} in extent with 28% (1 350 km^{2}) being situated in Botswana with a further 53% (2 561 km^{2}) situated in South Africa and the remaining 19% (960 km^{2}) situated in Zimbabwe. The area is of substantial importance for conservation reasons alone. With populations of species such as elephant, lion, leopard, cheetah, wild dog; as well as some 19 mammals, 26 plant species and a fair number of bird species listed in the red data book. The added range, protection and combined efforts offered through the establishment of the GMTFCA is strongly contributing to the protection of species found within the area. The dramatic landscapes and contrasts within the GMTFCA make it a very visually and naturally beautiful area of Southern Africa, and adding to this are the cultural heritage sites, that increase the GMTFCA’s potential for drawing large numbers of local and international tourist.

== South Africa ==
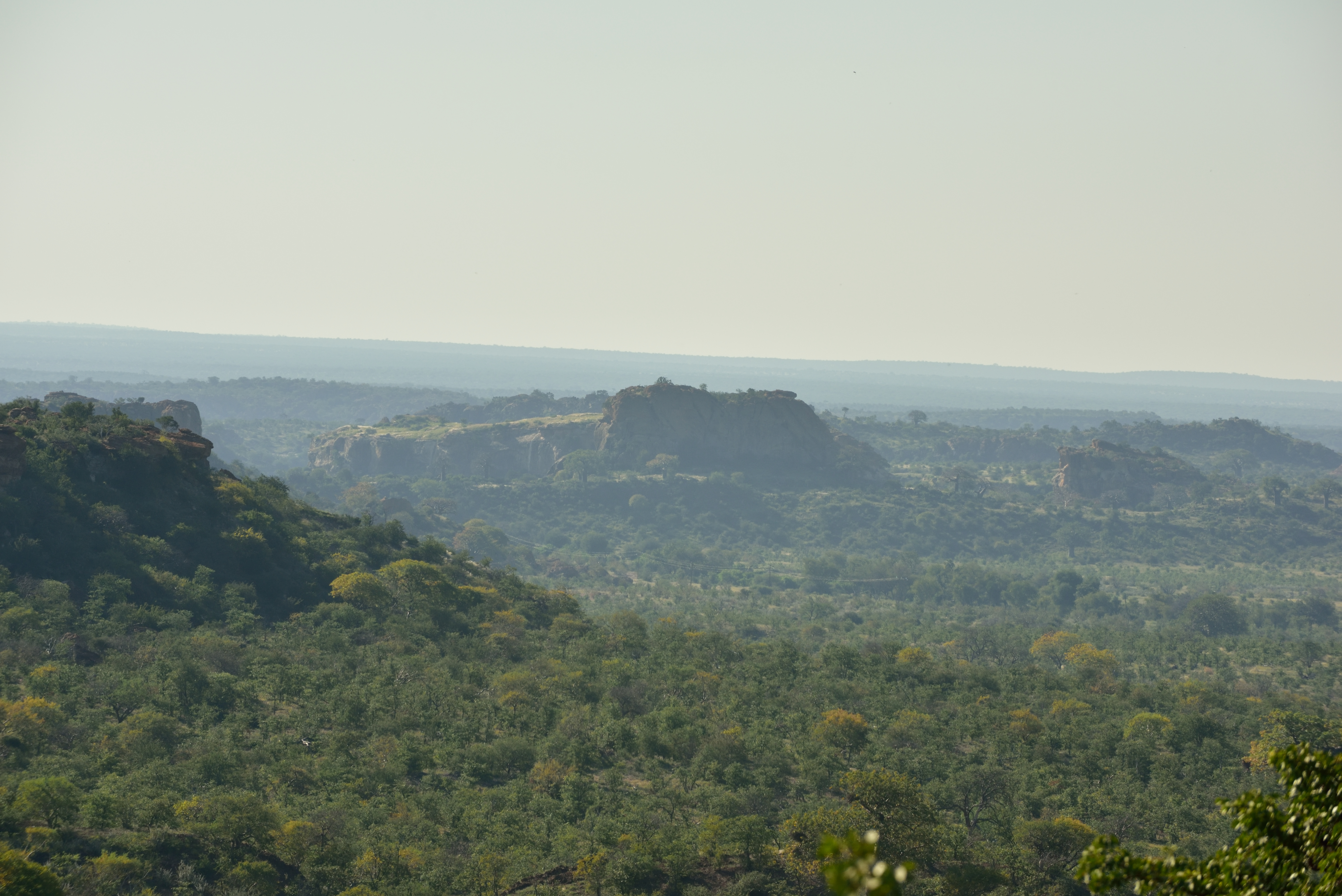
Undulating landscape of Mapungubwe National Park

South Africa's contribution to the transfrontier conservation area consist of the core area of the Mapungubwe National Park as well as the Venetia Limpopo Nature Reserve. Phase two of the project aims to include an additional number of properties including the proposed Limpopo Valley Conservancy, Mapesu Private Game Reserve, the proposed Mogalakwena Game Reserve, the Vhembe Game Reserve as well as a number of smaller private farms. The total proposed area is 256,100 hectares or 53% of the entire Greater Mapungubwe Transfrontier Conservation Area.

== Botswana ==
Botswana's contribution to the Greater Mapungubwe Transfrontier Conservation Area consists of the Northern Tuli Game Reserve, comprising 36 freehold properties covering an area of 71,173 ha. In phase two the area is expected to increase in size with the inclusion of the Central Tuli Farms and the proposed Shashe CCA. In addition the area roughly extending from the town of Mathathane North to Kobojango and onwards to the Shashe River will also form part of the GMTFCA. In total Botswana's contribution to the TFCA is expected to be 135,000 ha, roughly 28% of the total area of the Greater Mapungubwe Transfrontier Conservation Area.

== Zimbabwe ==
Sentinel Ranch, Nottingham Estate and the Tuli Circle Safari Area make up Zimbabwe's contribution to the GMTFCA. In phase two the Maramani, Machuchuta as well as Hwali Wildlife Management Areas may also be included, extending the size of Zimbabwe's contribution to the Greater Mapungubwe Transfrontier Conservation Area to 96,000 hectares or roughly 19% of the entire park's area.

== See also ==
- Mapungubwe National Park
- The Mapungubwe World Heritage Site
- Mapesu Private Game Reserve
