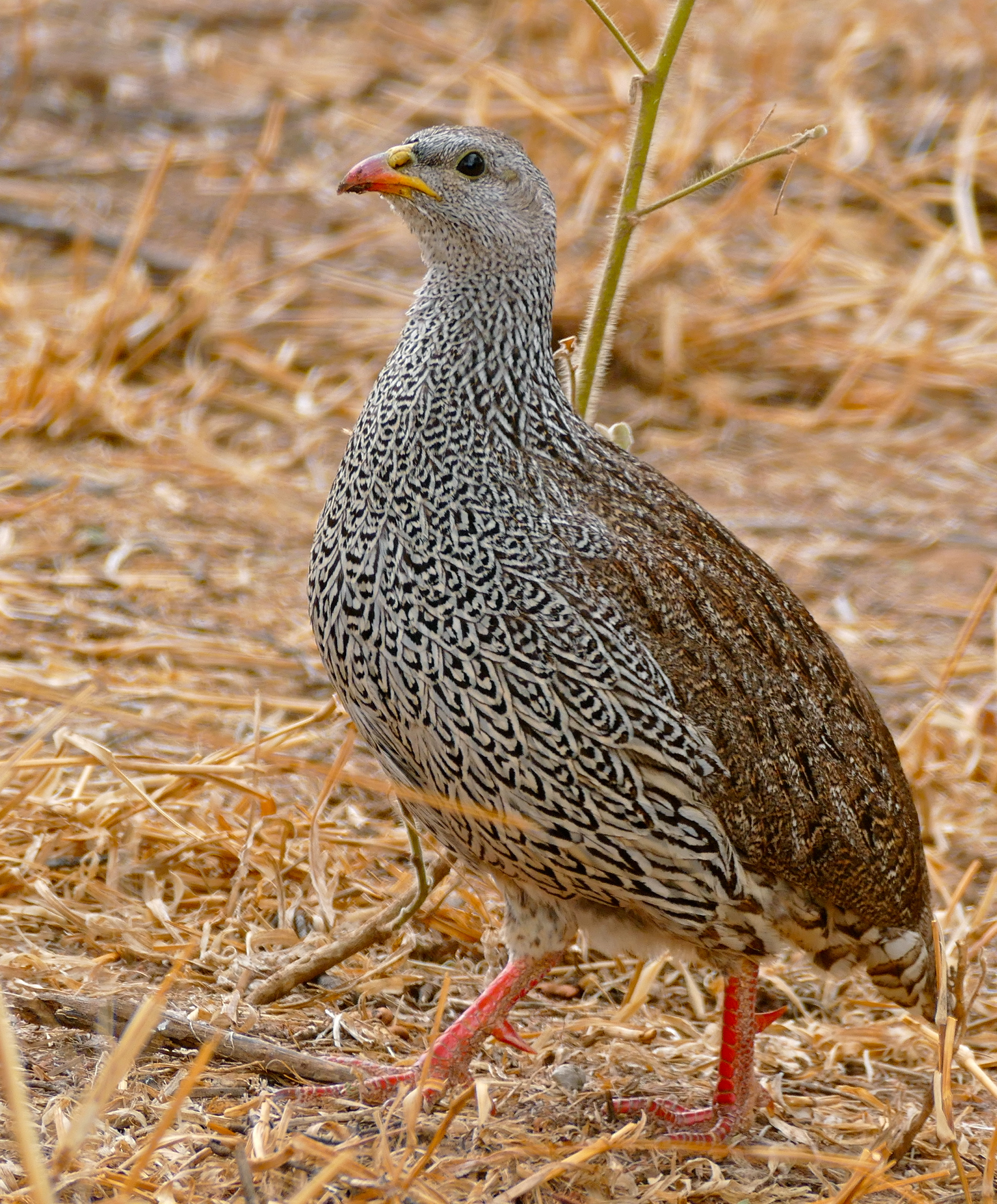
- At Mapungubwe National Park

Conservation status
- Least Concern (IUCN 3.1)

Scientific classification
- Kingdom: Animalia
- Phylum: Chordata
- Class: Aves
- Order: Galliformes
- Family: Phasianidae
- Genus: Pternistis
- Species: P. natalensis

Binomial name
- Pternistis natalensis (Smith, A, 1833)
- geographic distribution

Synonyms
- Francolinus Natalensis (protonym)

= Natal spurfowl =

Species of bird

The Natal spurfowl or Natal francolin (Pternistis natalensis) is a species of bird in the family Phasianidae. It is found in Botswana, Eswatini, Mozambique, South Africa, Zambia, and Zimbabwe.

== Taxonomy ==
The Natal spurfowl was described in 1833 by the Scottish zoologist Andrew Smith and given the binomial name Francolinus natalensis. Smith noted that the species inhabited brushwood thickets in the vicinity of Natal, in the east of South Africa. The species is now placed in the genus Pternistis that was introduced by the German naturalist Johann Georg Wagler in 1832. A phylogenetic study published in 2019 found that the Natal spurfowl is sister to Hildebrandt's spurfowl. The Natal spurfowl is considered as monotypic: the proposed subspecies neavei is not recognised.

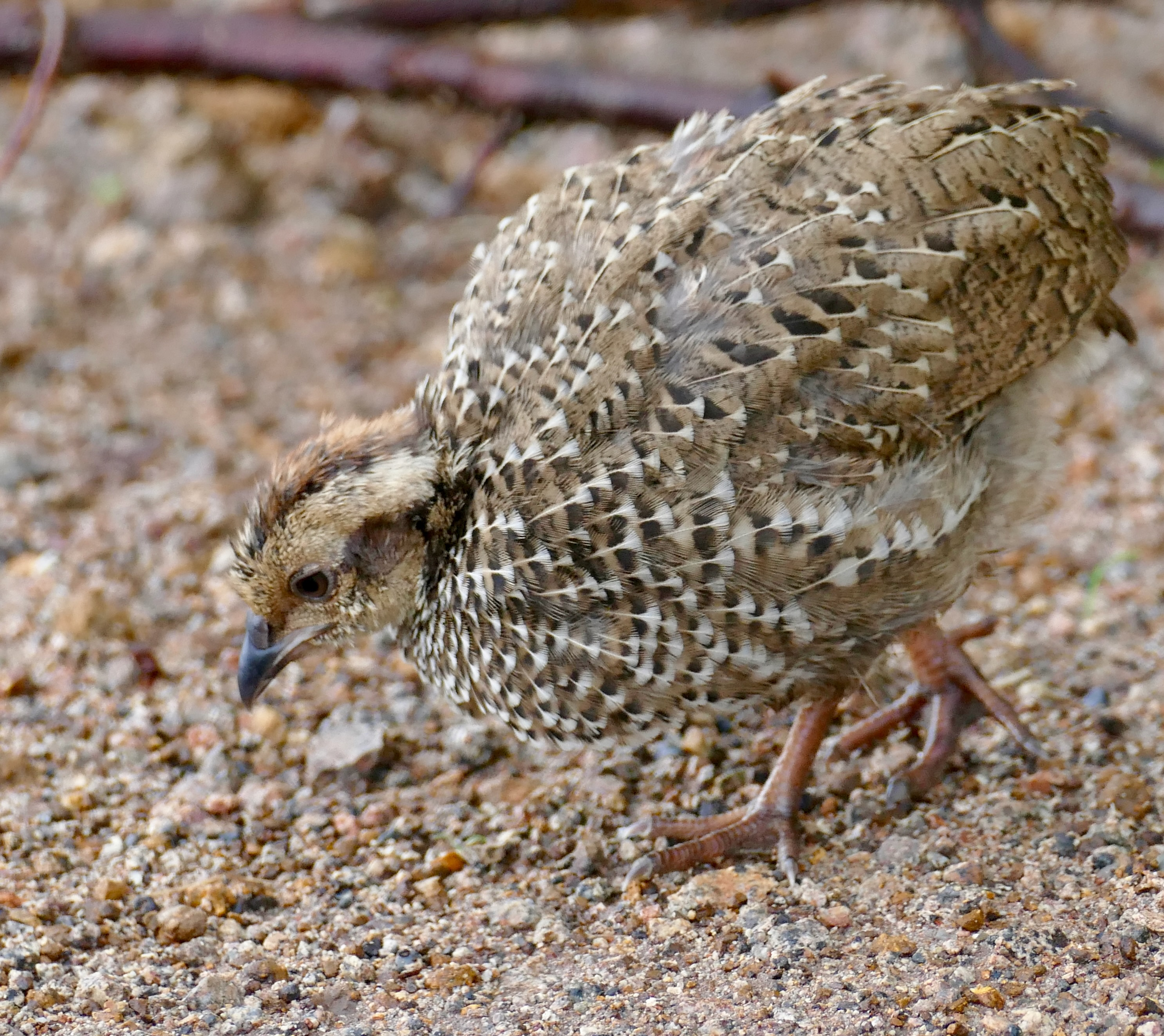
Juvenile bird at Pilanesberg

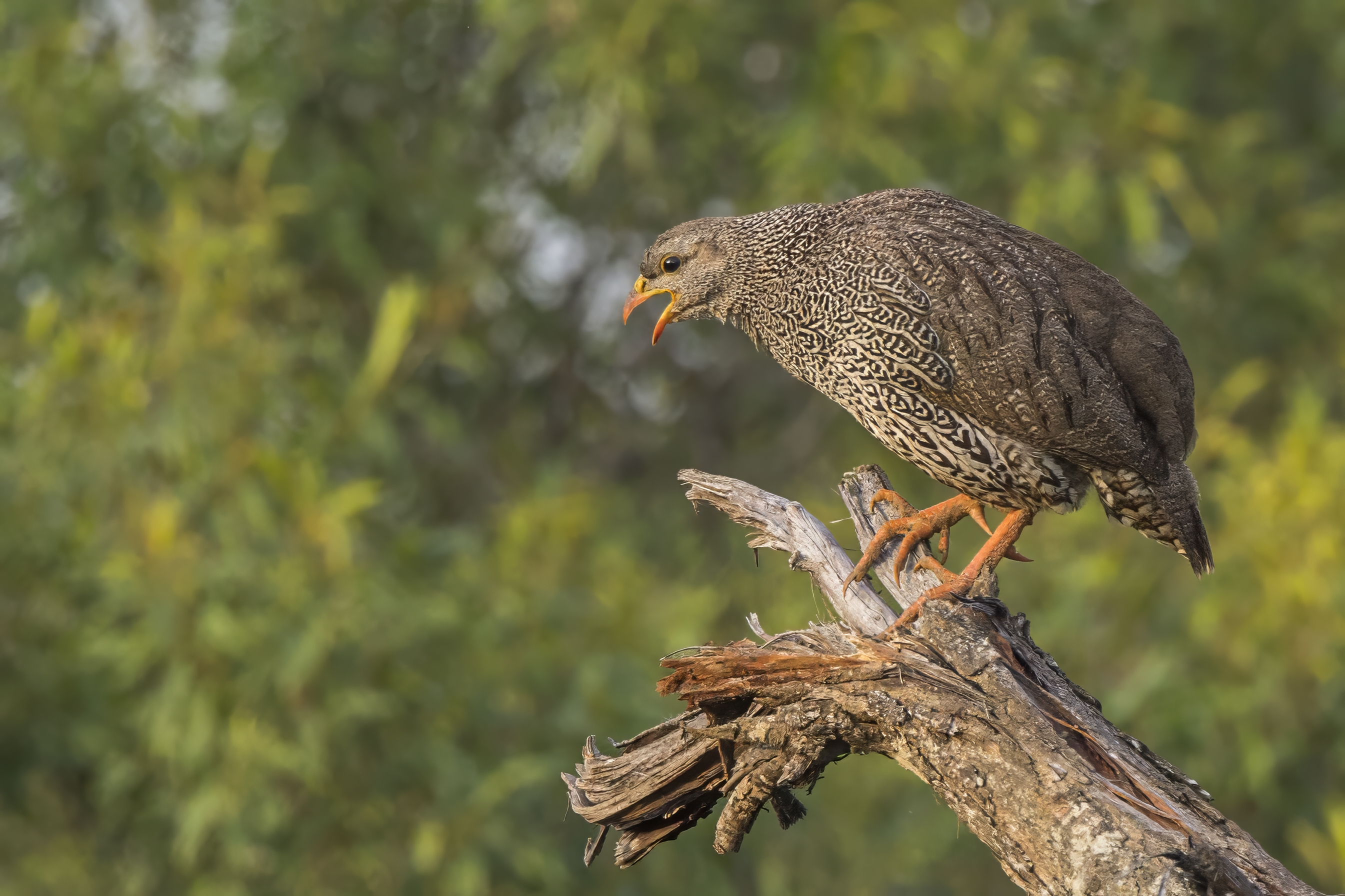
Adult bird settling on a perch, Kruger Park
