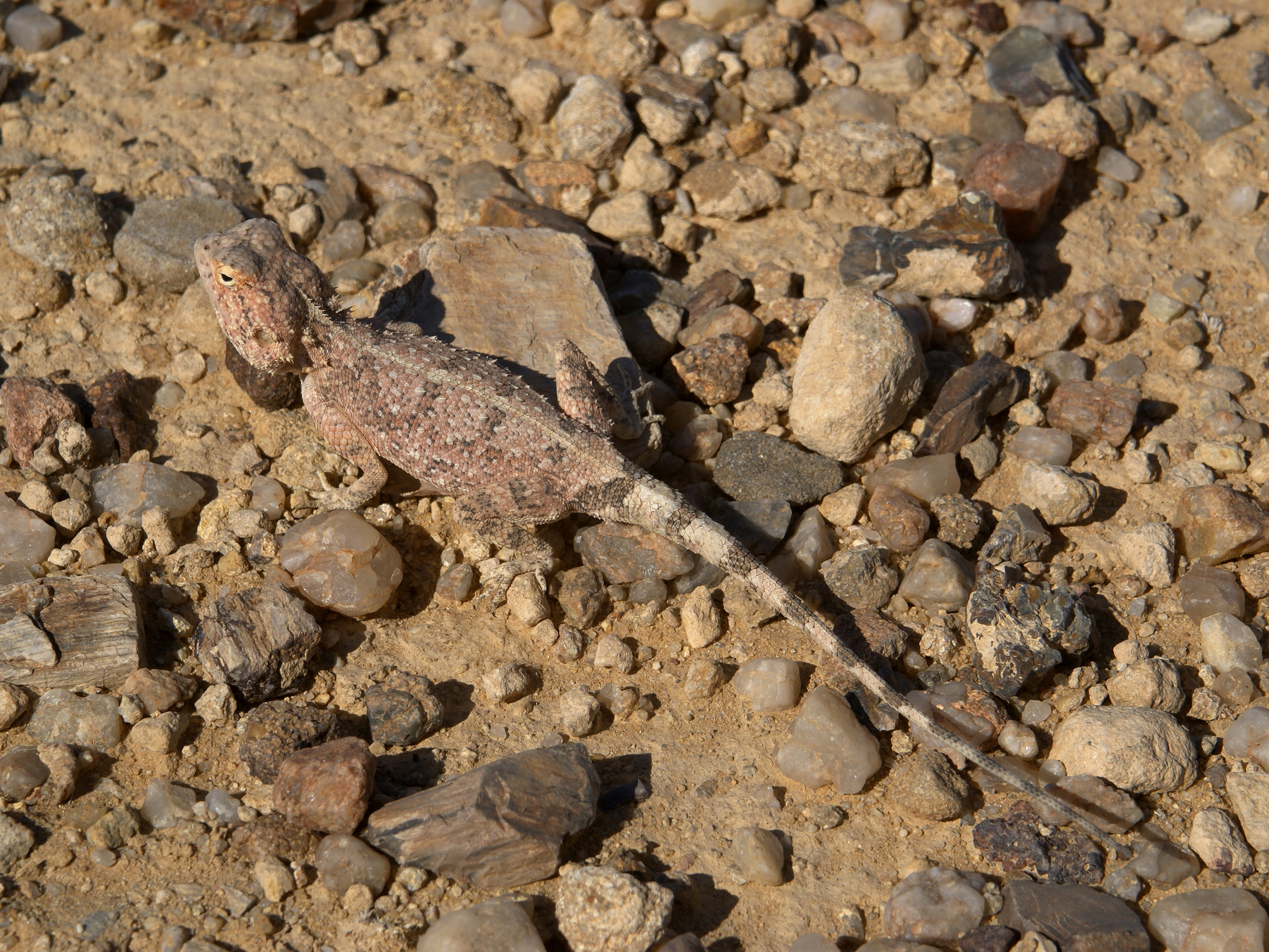
- in Damaraland, Namibia
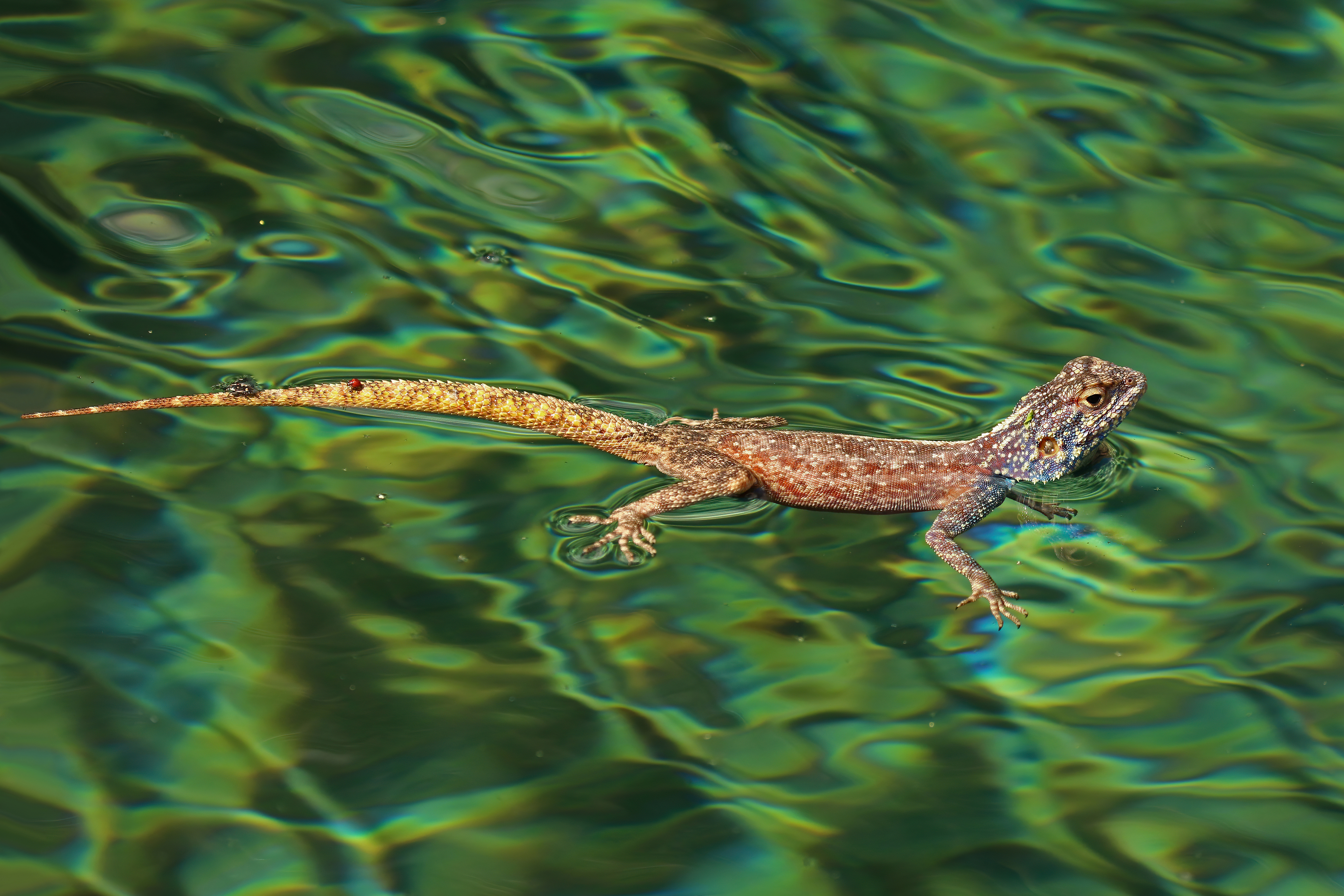
- in South Africa

Scientific classification
- Kingdom: Animalia
- Phylum: Chordata
- Class: Reptilia
- Order: Squamata
- Suborder: Iguania
- Family: Agamidae
- Genus: Agama
- Species: A. aculeata

Binomial name
- Agama aculeata Merrem, 1820

Subspecies
- A. a. aculeata Merrem, 1820; A. a. distanti (Boulenger, 1902)

Synonyms
- Saura spinalis Agama infralineata

= Agama aculeata =

Species of lizard

Agama aculeata, the ground agama, is a species of lizard from the family Agamidae, found in most of sub-Saharan Africa (Namibia, Botswana, Zimbabwe, South Africa, Mozambique, Southern Angola, Tanzania, Zambia, Eswatini).

== Description ==
Snout-to-vent length is 76–100 mm. With a triangular head and rounded snout, this agama is coloured olive to reddish-brown (sometimes grey or yellowish) with a light creamy-white to pink belly. There are four or five paired darker blotches on the back—many smaller blotches continue down the tail. Breeding males become blue on the sides of their heads.

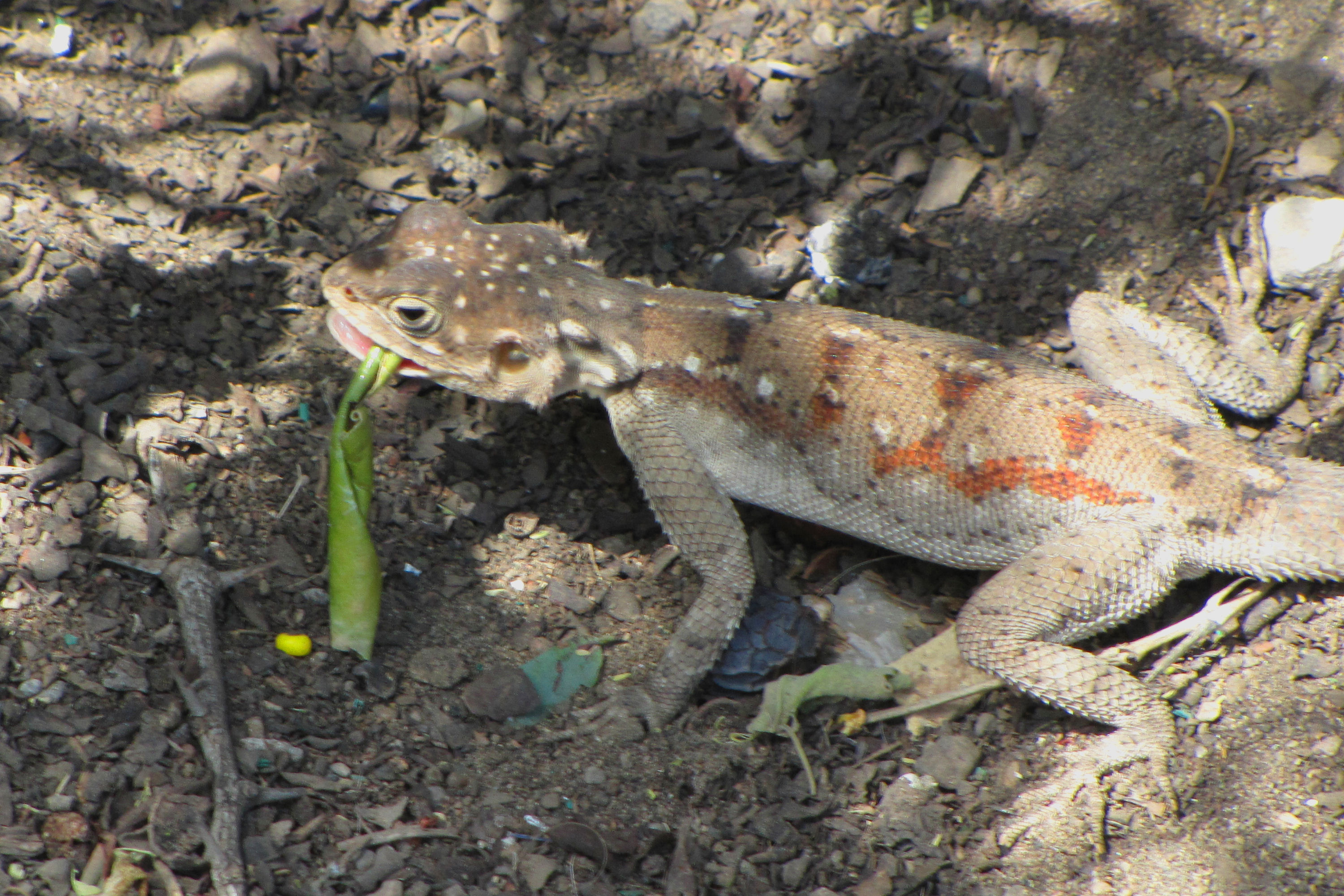
Female ground agama in Serengeti, Tanzania

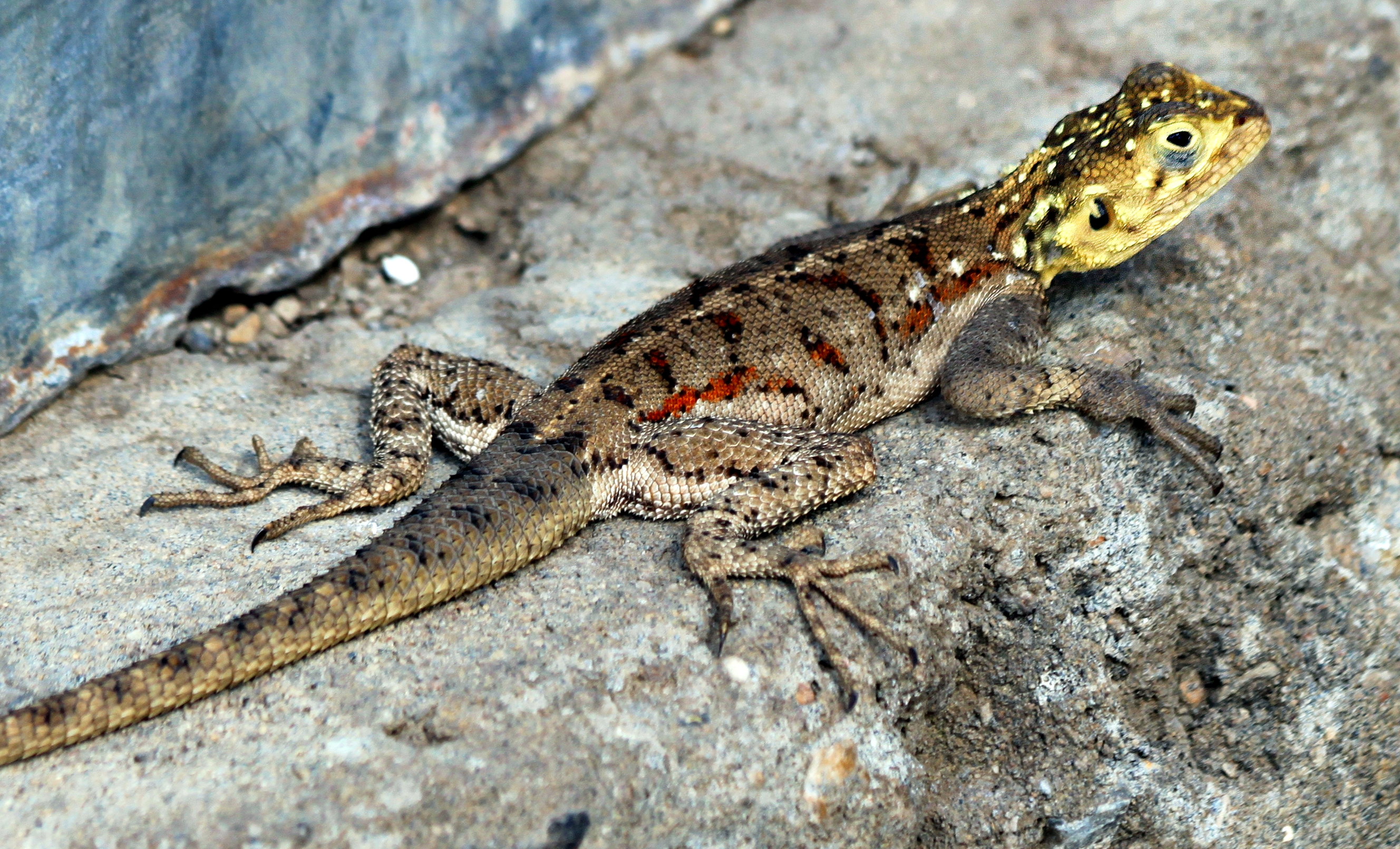
Ground agama in Tanzania

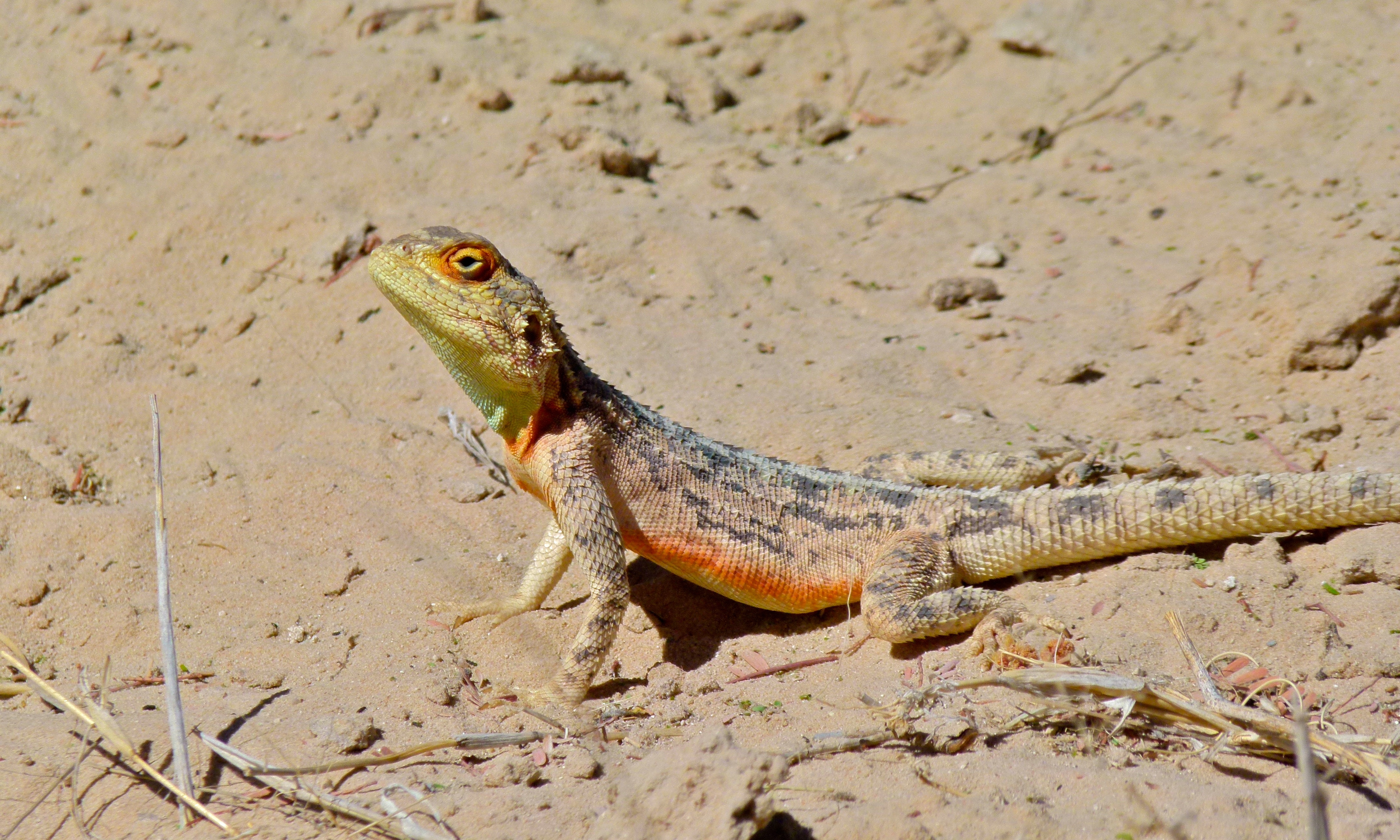

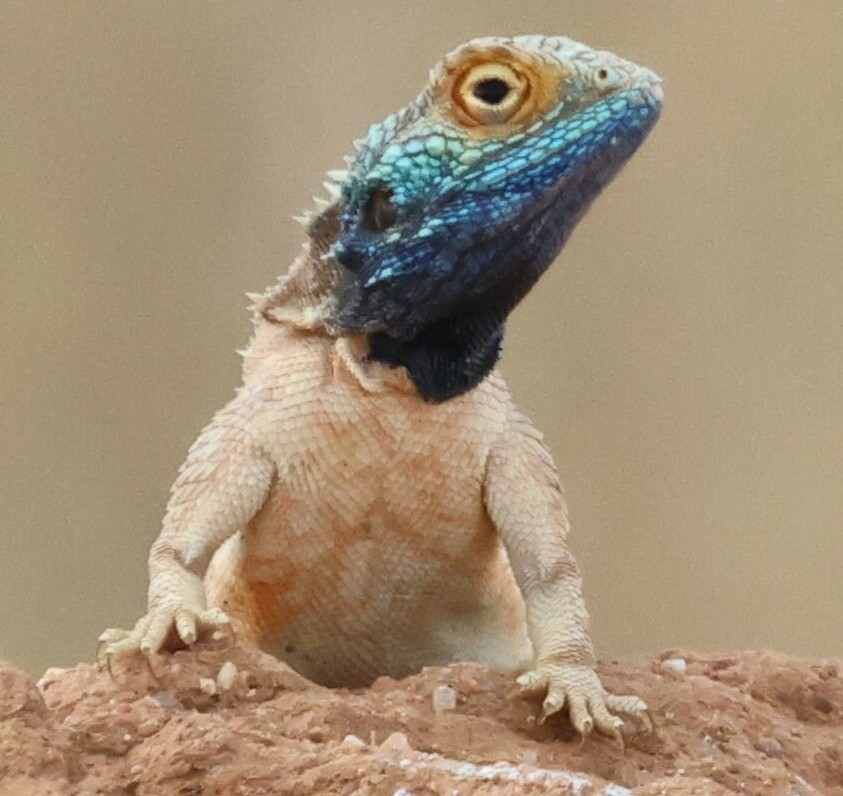

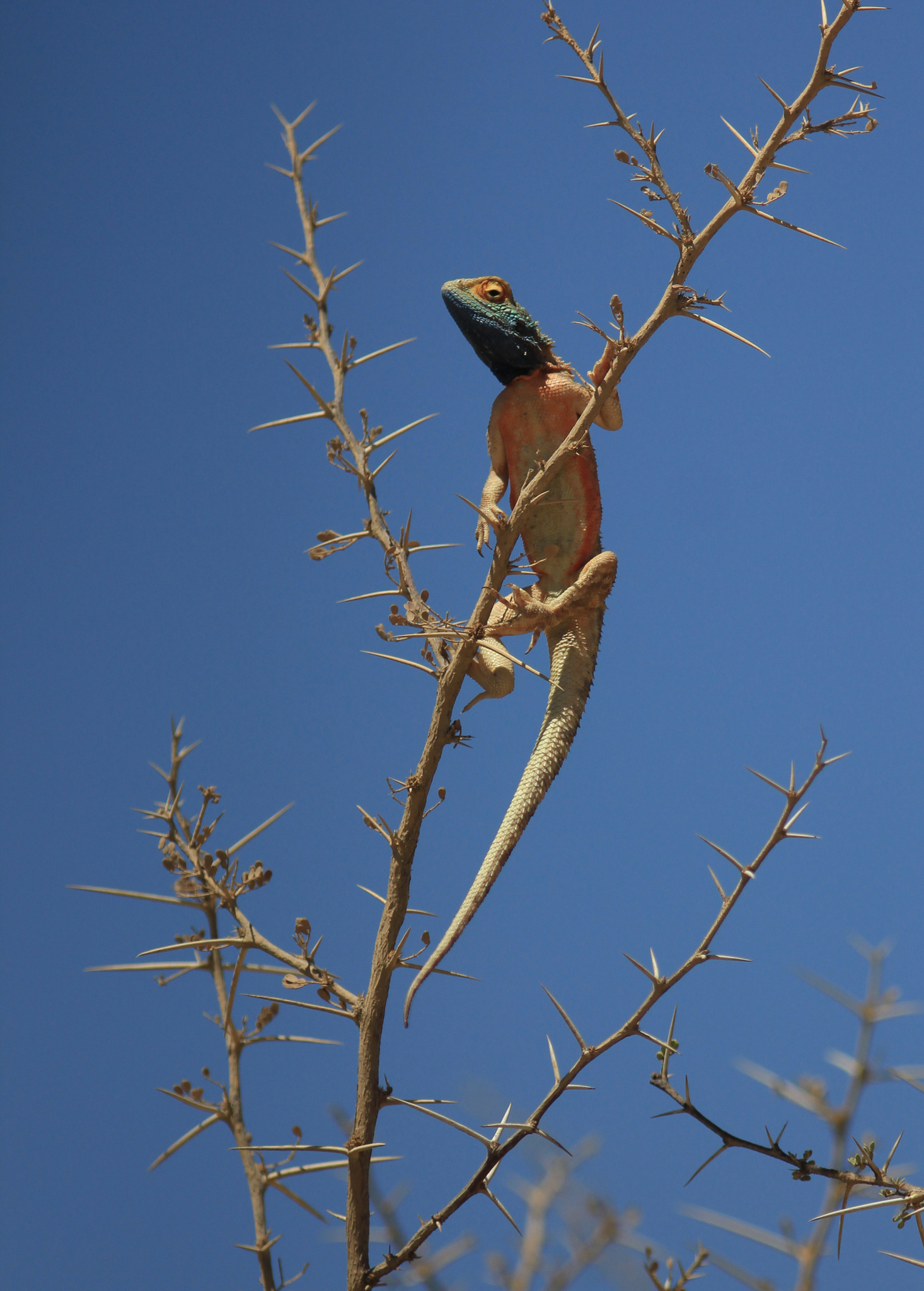
Climbing
