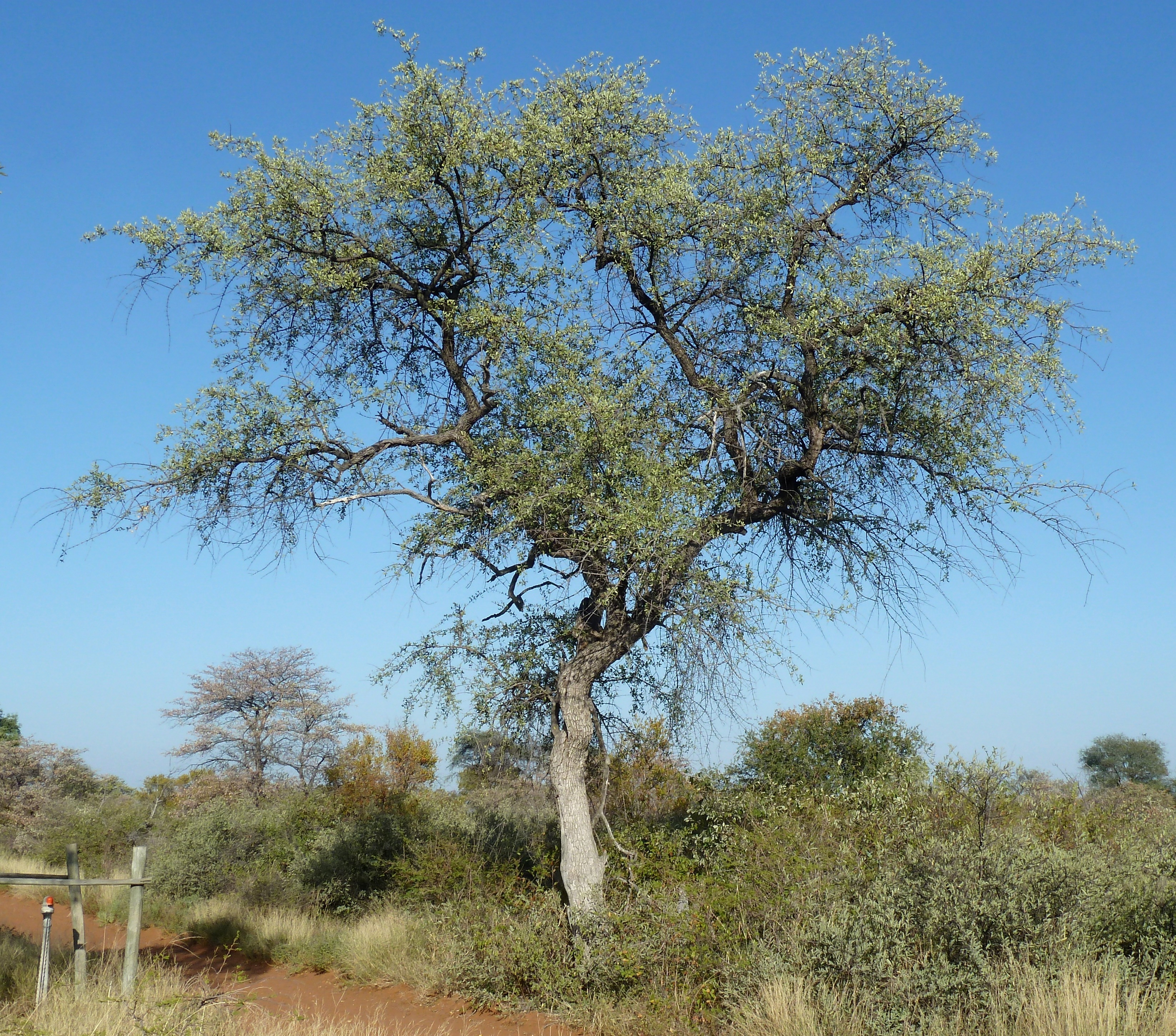

Conservation status
- Least Concern (IUCN 3.1)

Scientific classification
- Kingdom: Plantae
- Clade: Tracheophytes
- Clade: Angiosperms
- Clade: Eudicots
- Clade: Rosids
- Order: Myrtales
- Family: Combretaceae
- Genus: Combretum
- Species: C. imberbe

Binomial name
- Combretum imberbe Wawra

Synonyms
- Combretum primigenum Marloth ex Engl.

= Combretum imberbe =

Leadwood tree

Species of tree

Combretum imberbe (also known as leadwood or mhoba-hoba, Afrikaans: hardekool, Sotho: mohwelere-tšhipi, Tsonga: motswiri/mondzo, Zulu: impondondlovu) is a characteristic and often impressive bushwillow species of the southern Afrotropics. The medium to large tree has a sparse, semi-deciduous canopy of grey-green leaves. The twigs and leaves are hairless as the name imberbe suggests. Its heartwood is dark brown, close-grained, very hard and heavy, as suggested by its vernacular name "leadwood", and durable; it is much sought after in the woodcarving industry. The Hereros and Ovambos of Namibia attach special cultural and religious significance to the tree, as to them it is the great ancestor of all animals and people, which must be passed with respect.

== Range ==
It is native to the mesic savannas of Africa south of the equator, from KwaZulu-Natal province, South Africa, in the south to Tanzania in the north. It is a native tree in South Africa, eSwatini, Botswana, Namibia, Zimbabwe, Mozambique, Angola, Zambia and Tanzania. It is a protected tree in South Africa.

== Description ==
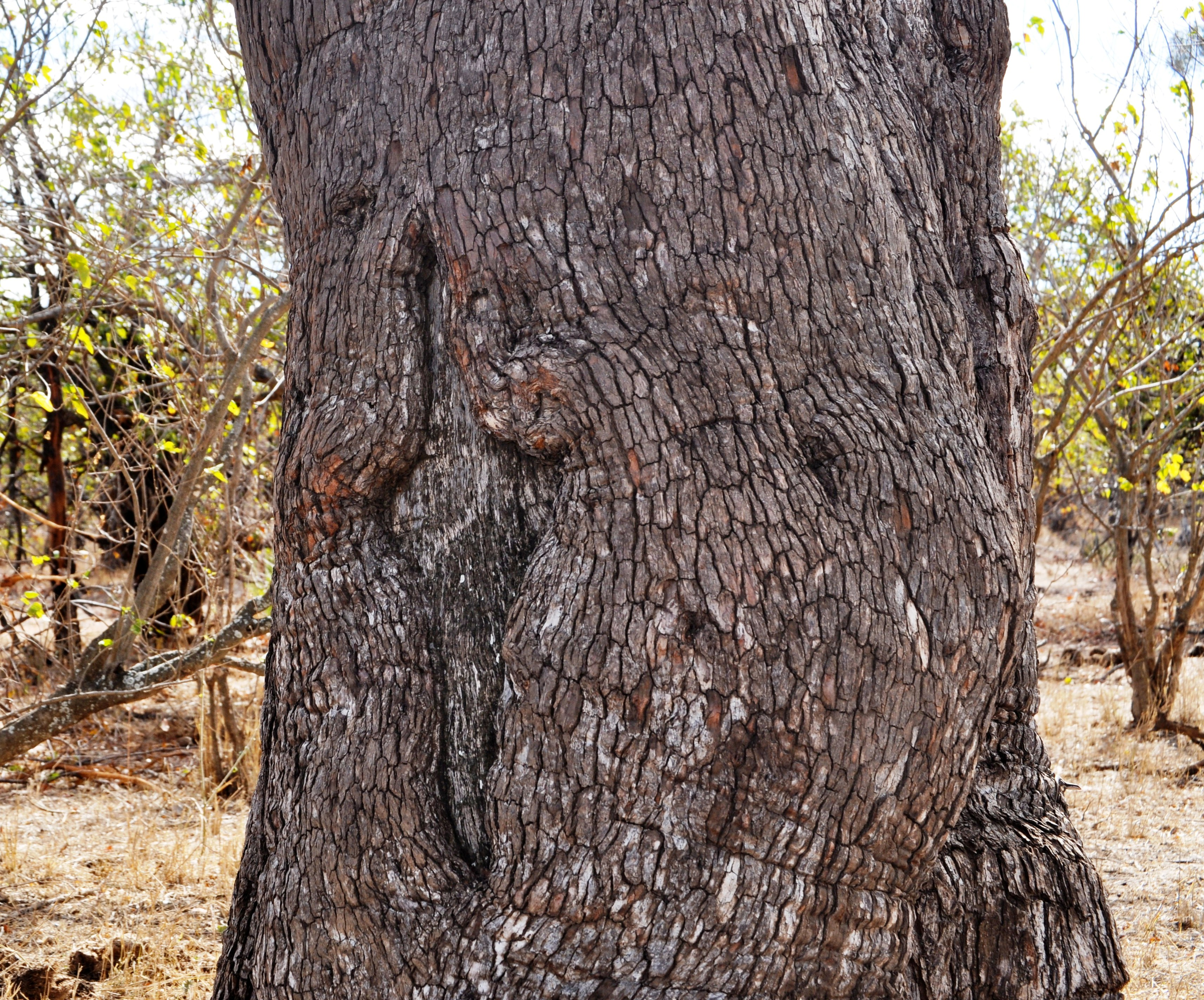
A cross carved by 1860s travellers, as it appears 150 years later

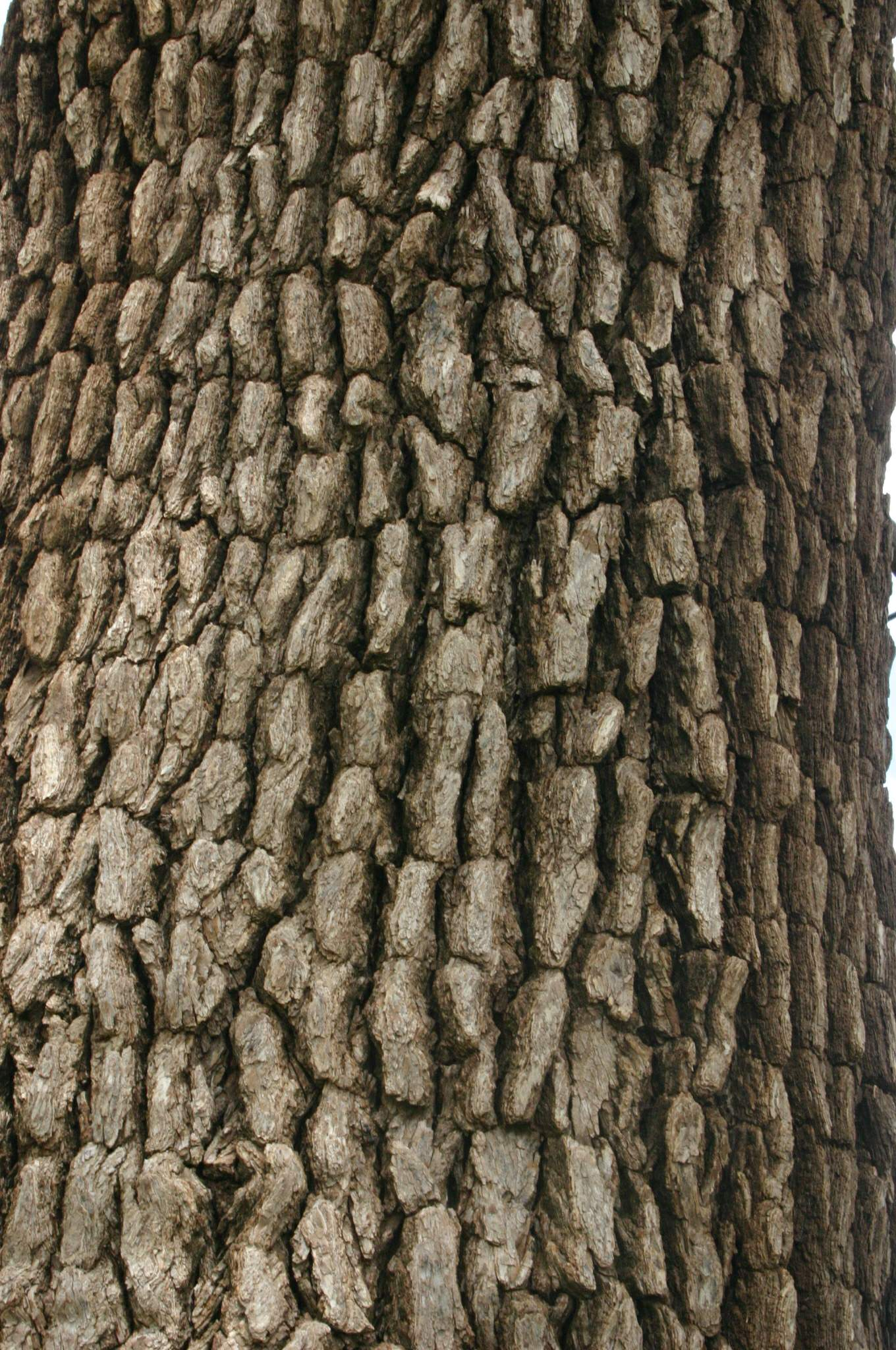
The distinctively coarse, granulated bark

The largest bushwillow species of southern Africa has a distinct habit and features. It has a spreading, rather sparse, roundish to slightly umbrella-shaped crown. The smallish, grey-green leaves and small, yellowish-green samaras are carried on spiny, attenuate branchlets.

It typically grows 7 metres (23 ft) to 15 metres (49 ft) tall, but may reach 20 metres (66 ft). In maturity the single, solid bole may be up 1.5 metres (4.9 ft) in diameter. The distinctive bark is pale to dark grey in colour, deeply fissured lengthwise. Irregular horizontal cracks infuse the bark a fairly regular, coarse-grained appearance.

Radiocarbon dating, done in South Africa, has established that a leadwood tree can live up to 1070 ± 40 years. A tree can remain standing for many years after it has died.

== Uses ==
- The wood is dense and very hard, difficult to plane, but drills, sands and turns well. It is termite resistant. It was once used for railway sleepers and is now prized for ornamental work and furniture.
- It burns very slowly with intense heat, and is often used for a fire which is intended to burn all night in order to keep wild animals at bay. It is sometimes used in a barbecue to provide a hot, long-lasting flame.
- The ashes are used as whitewash for painting walls of kraal huts.
- The ashes can also be used as toothpaste when mixed into a paste with water.

The ashes can also be added in a paste of tamarind, kneaded together to make a sweet smoothie. This is common among the Marembe people in Nyamapanda area.

== Gallery ==
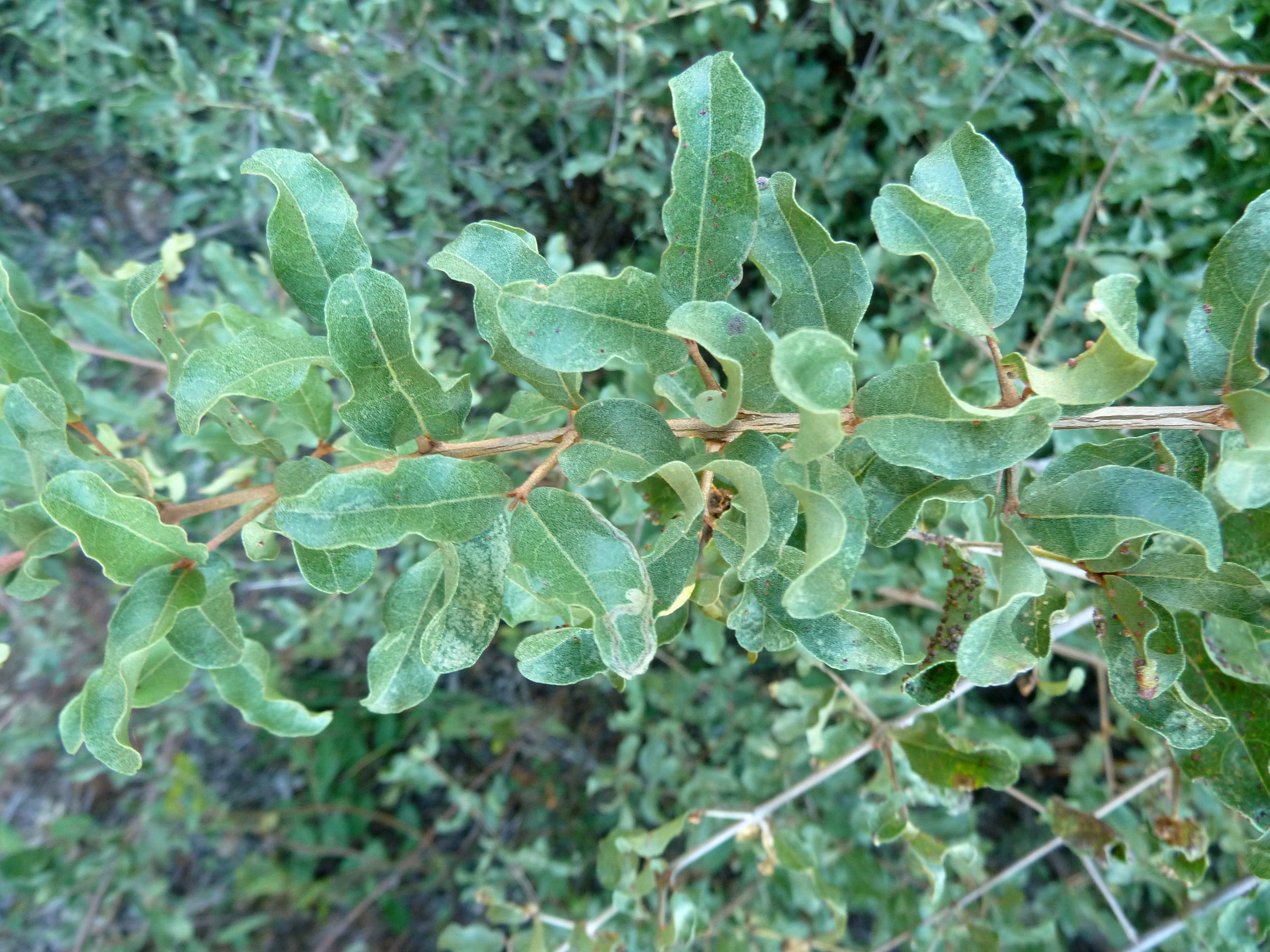
close-up of foliage

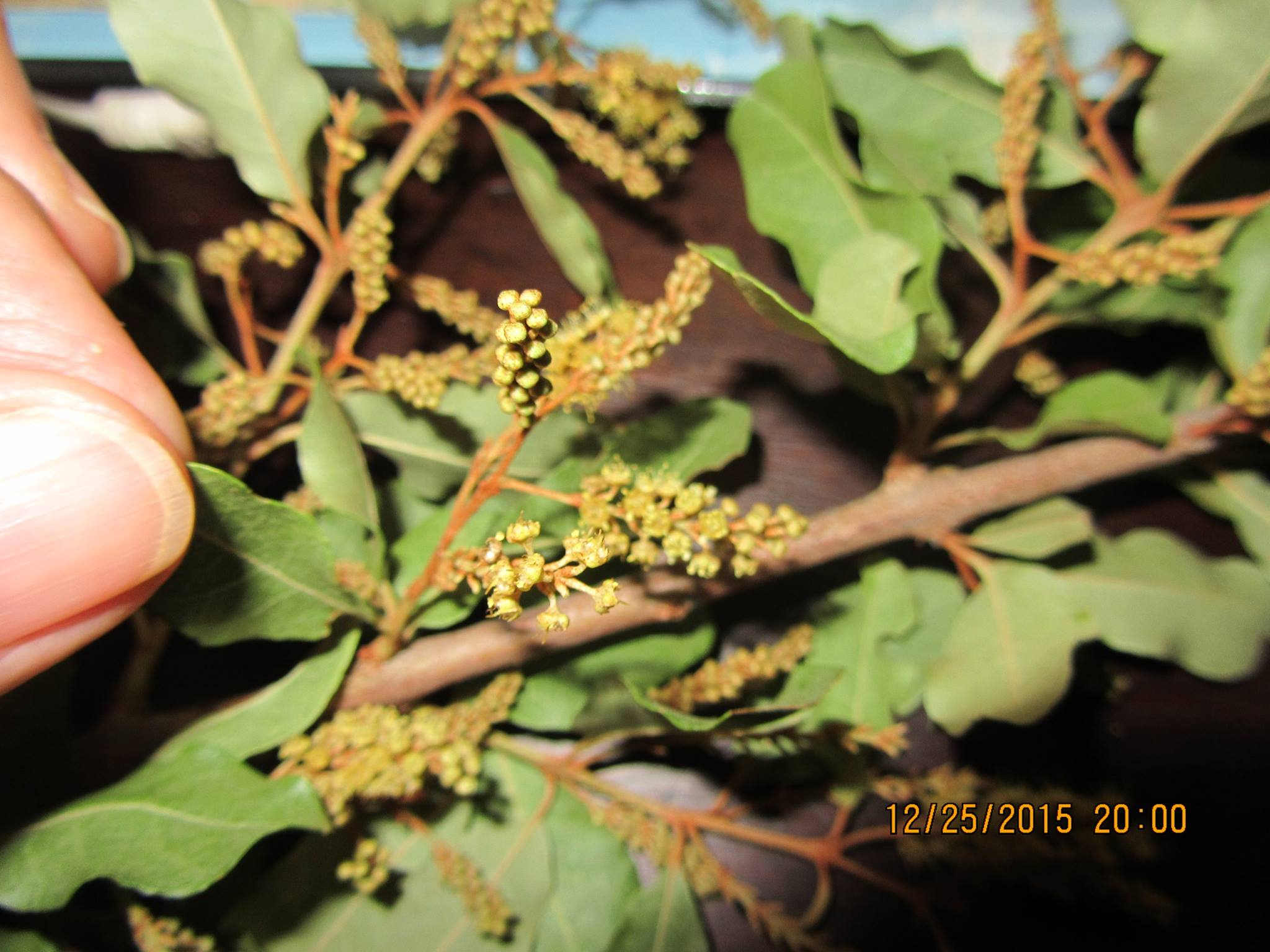
flower buds and flowers

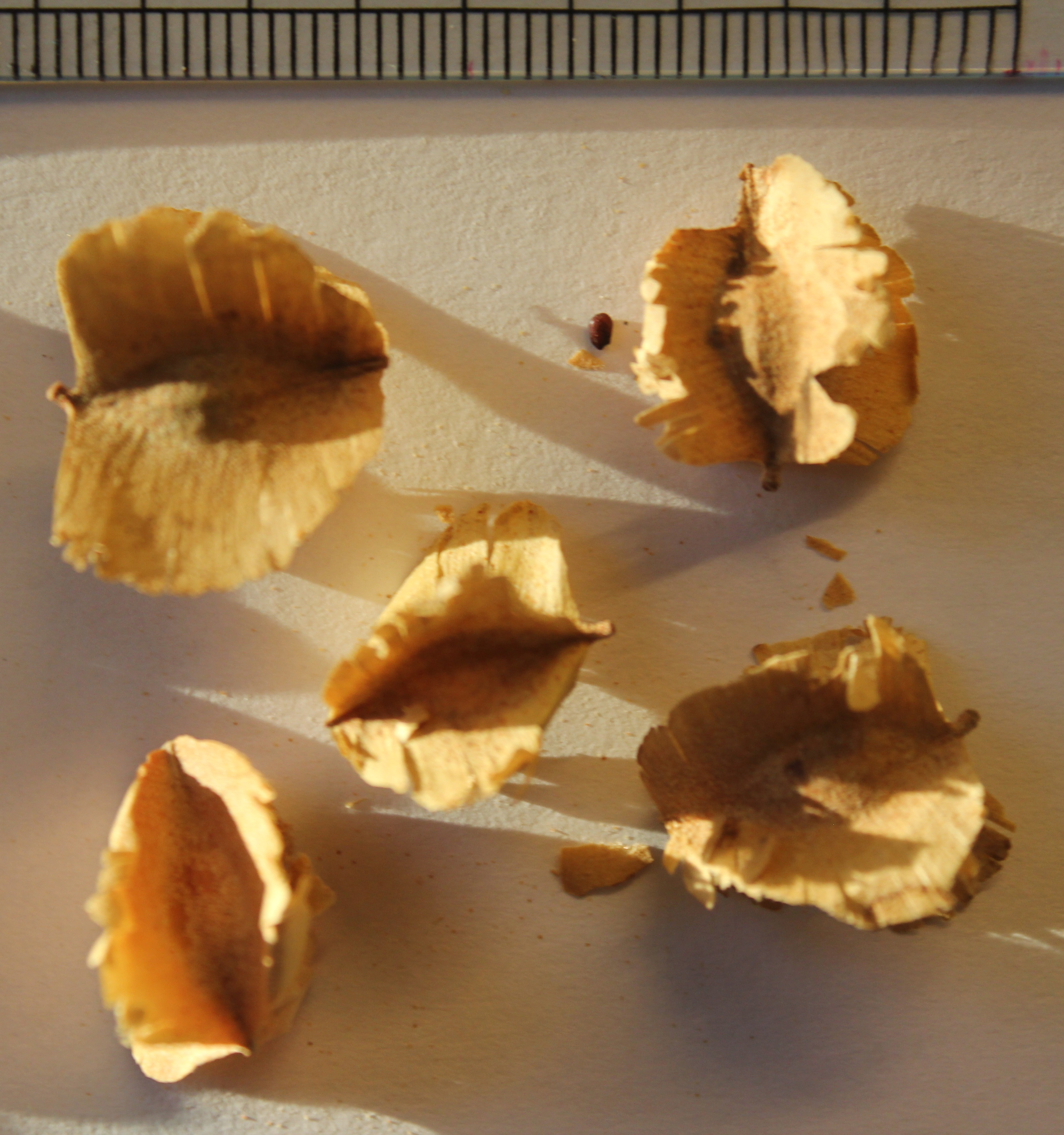
winged fruit
