= Five-lined skink =

The name five-lined skink can refer to different species of skinks:

- Plestiodon fasciatus, the five-lined skink or eastern red-headed skink of North America
- Trachylepis quinquetaeniata, the five-lined mabuya of Africa
