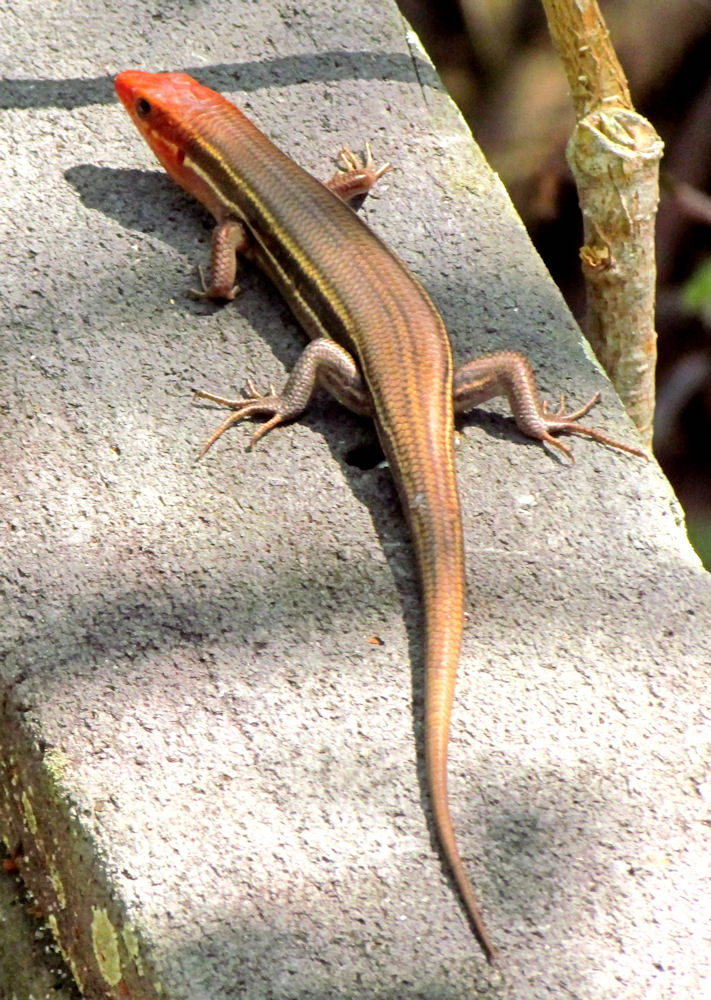
- Male

Conservation status
- Least Concern (IUCN 3.1)

- Secure (NatureServe)

Scientific classification
- Kingdom: Animalia
- Phylum: Chordata
- Class: Reptilia
- Order: Squamata
- Family: Scincidae
- Genus: Plestiodon
- Species: P. inexpectatus

Binomial name
- Plestiodon inexpectatus (Taylor, 1932)
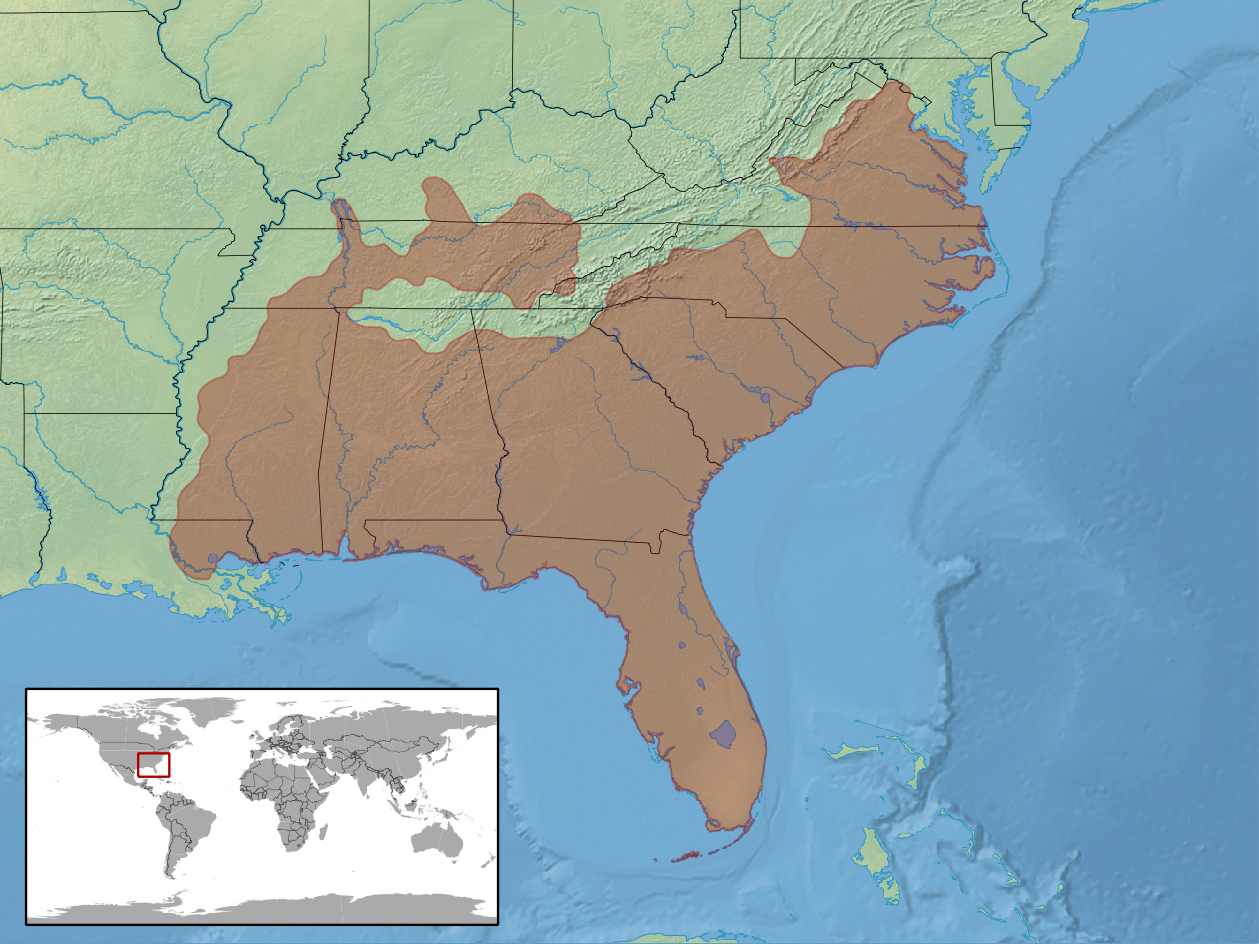

Synonyms
- Eumeces inexpectatus Taylor, 1932; Plestiodon inexpectatus — H.M. Smith, 2005

= Plestiodon inexpectatus =

Southeastern five-lined skink

Species of reptile

Plestiodon inexpectatus, the southeastern five-lined skink is a common skink in the southeastern United States.

== Etymology ==
The specific name, inexpectatus ("the unexpected"), is possibly a reference to the unexpected discovery of this species in 1932, almost 175 years after Linnaeus described Plestiodon fasciatus, commonly known as the American five-lined skink.

== Description ==
As their common name suggests, southeastern five-lined skinks have five characteristic narrow stripes along their bodies that become lighter with age. The middle stripe tends to be narrower than the others, and the dark areas between stripes are black in young skinks but become brown with age. A similar lizard, the common five-lined skink (Plestiodon fasciatus), is slightly smaller than the southeastern five-lined skink and has broader stripes. However, it is difficult to discriminate between these two species on the basis of physical appearance.

Young southeastern five-lined skinks have a bright blue or purplish tail, especially towards the tip. Also, stripes become a bright reddish orange towards the head. Juvenile coloration may persist into adulthood, giving the head of the animal an altogether orange-brown appearance.

== Habitat ==
Southeastern five-lined skinks are common inhabitants of wooded areas of the southeastern United States. They are commonly found on small islands off the southeastern coast even in the absence of fresh water and vegetation.

== Behavior ==
They are diurnal ground-dwelling animals.

== Diet ==
Like other skinks of the genus Plestiodon, they feed primarily on insects, preferring larger prey such as grasshoppers.

== In captivity ==
This skink species is easy to maintain in captivity. It has the same requirements as the common five-lined skink, although it can tolerate dryer conditions.

== Reproduction ==
Southeastern five-lined skinks are oviparous; the clutch size varies from 6 to 12, with the number of eggs diminishing with higher latitudes. The female broods the eggs and protects them from predators, including other skinks. The hatchlings appear about one month after the eggs have been laid near the beginning of summer.
