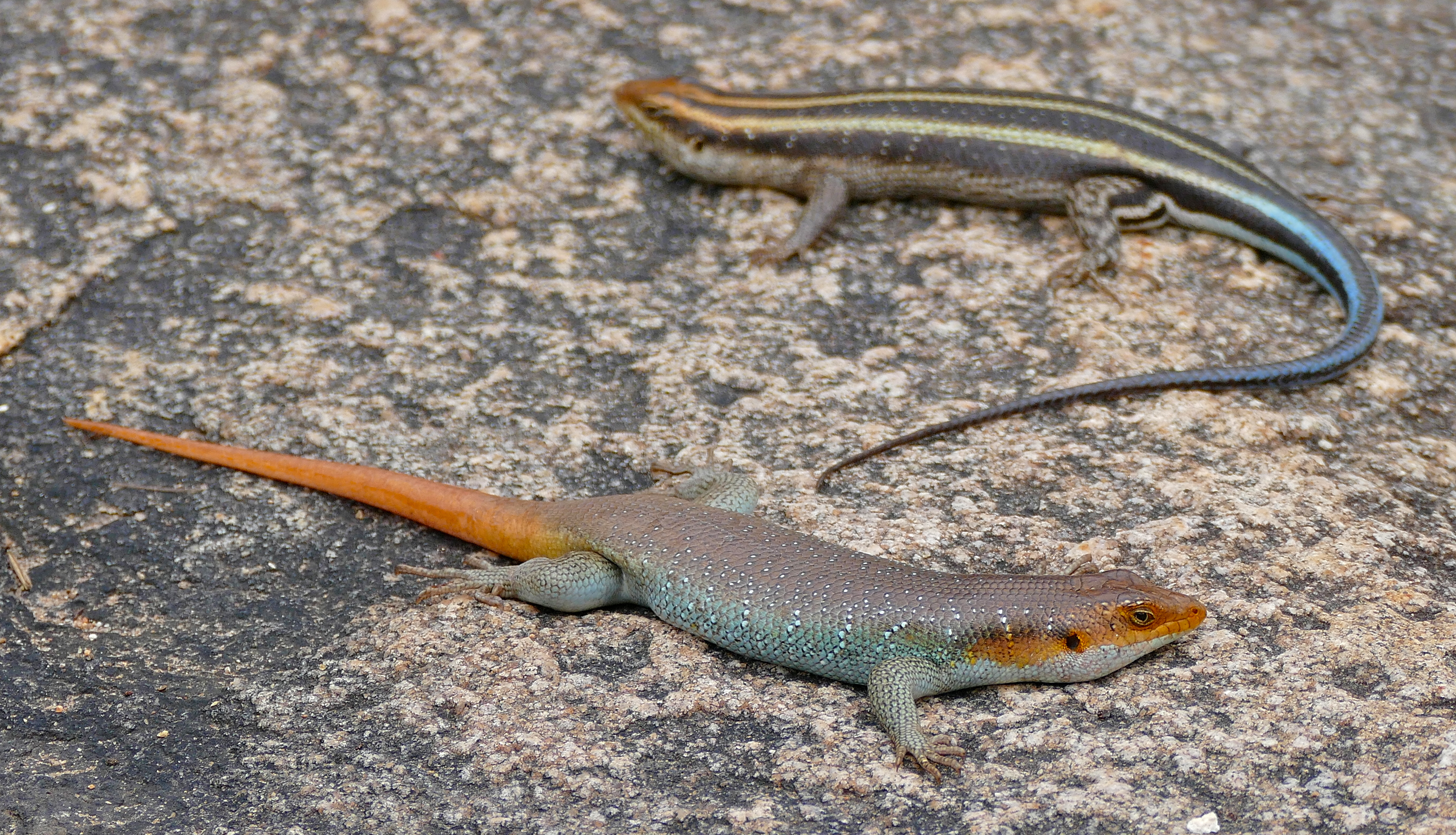
- Male
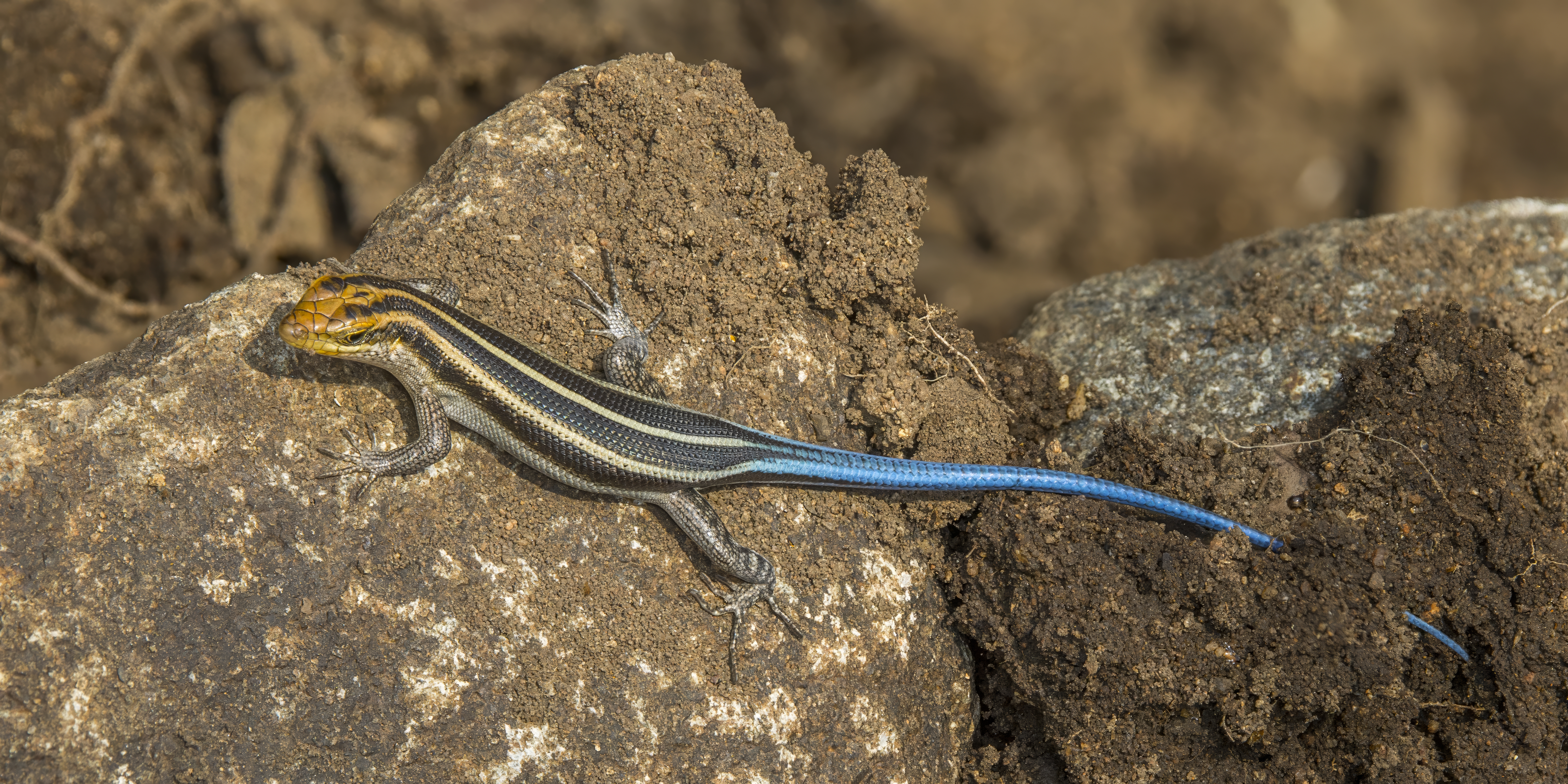
- Female; Both in South Africa

Conservation status
- Least Concern (IUCN 3.1)

Scientific classification
- Kingdom: Animalia
- Phylum: Chordata
- Class: Reptilia
- Order: Squamata
- Family: Scincidae
- Genus: Trachylepis
- Species: T. margaritifera

Binomial name
- Trachylepis margaritifera (Peters, 1854)

Synonyms
- Euprepes margaritifer Peters 1854; Mabuya obsti Werner 1913; Mabuya obsti Loveridge 1923; Mabuya quinquetaeniata obsti Loveridge 1936; Mabuya quinquetaeniata obsti Broadley 1962; Mabuya quinquetaeniata margaritifer Broadley 1962; Mabuya quinquetaeniata margaritifer Broadley & Howell 1991; Mabuya margaritifer Branch 1993; Mabuya quinquetaeniata margaritifer Bauer et al. 1995; Mabuya margaritifera Broadley & Bauer 1999; Euprepis margaritiferus Mausels et al. 2002; Trachylepis margaritifera Bauer 2003; Trachylepis margaritifer Branch et al. 2005; Mabuya margaritifer Cooper 2005

= Trachylepis margaritifera =

Species of lizard

Trachylepis margaritifera, the rainbow skink, is a species of Afro-Malagasy mabuya or skink in the subfamily Lygosominae.

== Taxonomy ==
Mabuya quinquetaeniata margaritifera, formerly a subspecies of Trachylepis quinquetaeniata (the five-lined mabuya, also known as the rainbow skink), was elevated to full species in 1998 (as Trachylepis margaritifera).

== Description ==
Trachylepis margaritifera is a medium-sized lizard reaching a length of about 20 centimetres (7.9 in). The coloration of this species is quite variable, depending on the gender and the age. The scales are glossy, with metallic reflections. The basic colour is usually olive-brown or dark brown, sometimes with pearly whitish spots and with three light yellow-orange longitudinal stripes running from the head to the electric blue tail. These stripes may fade and become indistinct in the adults.

The head shows a pointed snout and clearly visible ears holes. Just behind the ear opening, there are some black spots. Legs are dark brown, short and strong, with relatively long toes. The flanks are mainly yellowish and the underside of the body is whitish.

== Distribution ==
It is found in southern Africa, from KwaZulu-Natal in South Africa to southern Malawi; isolated populations occur in central to southeastern Tanzania and southern Kenya. It is found in rocky and mountainous regions of these countries.
