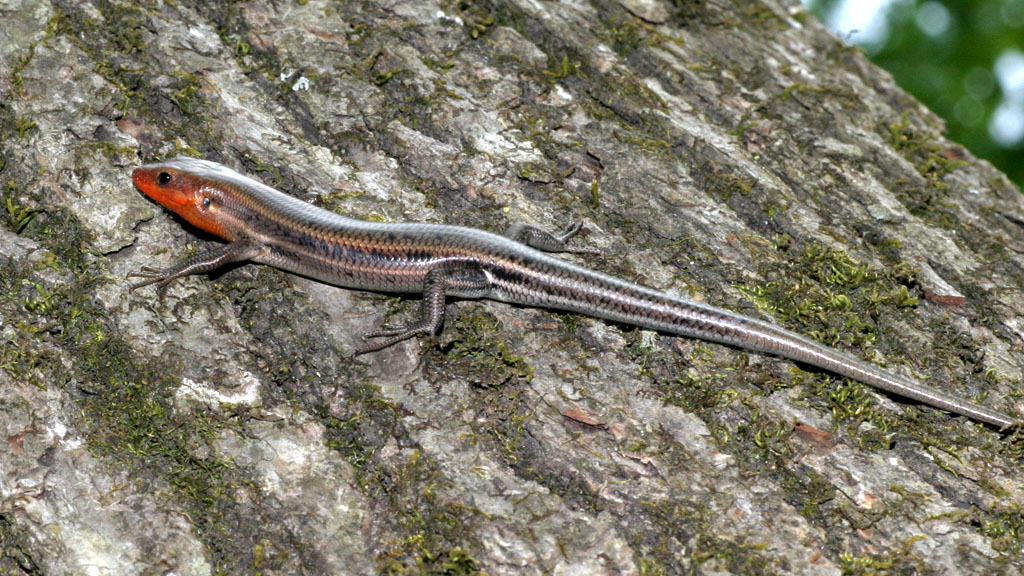
- Adult male
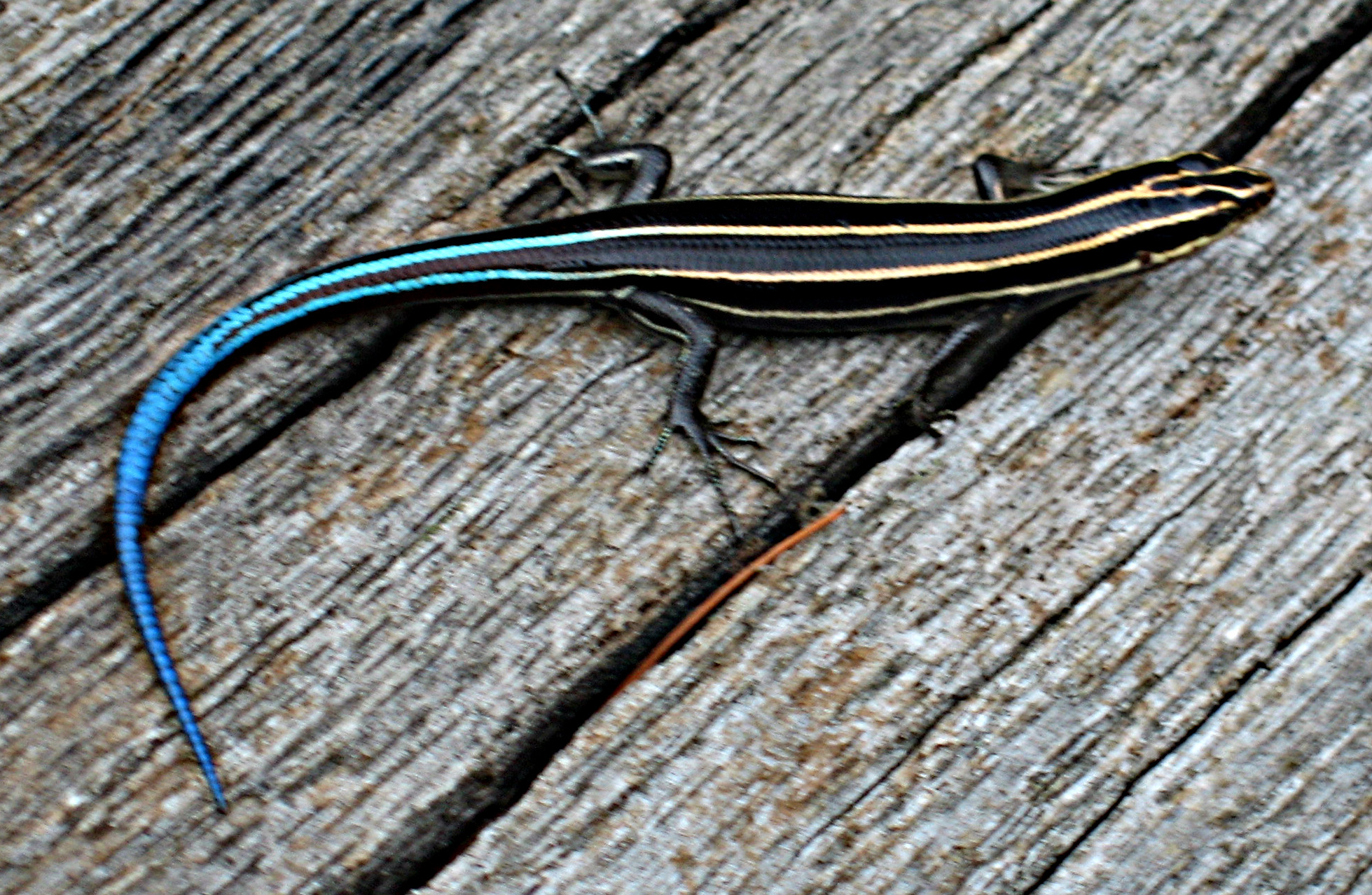
- Juvenile

Conservation status
- Least Concern (IUCN 3.1)

Scientific classification
- Kingdom: Animalia
- Phylum: Chordata
- Class: Reptilia
- Order: Squamata
- Family: Scincidae
- Genus: Plestiodon
- Species: P. fasciatus

Binomial name
- Plestiodon fasciatus (Linnaeus, 1758)
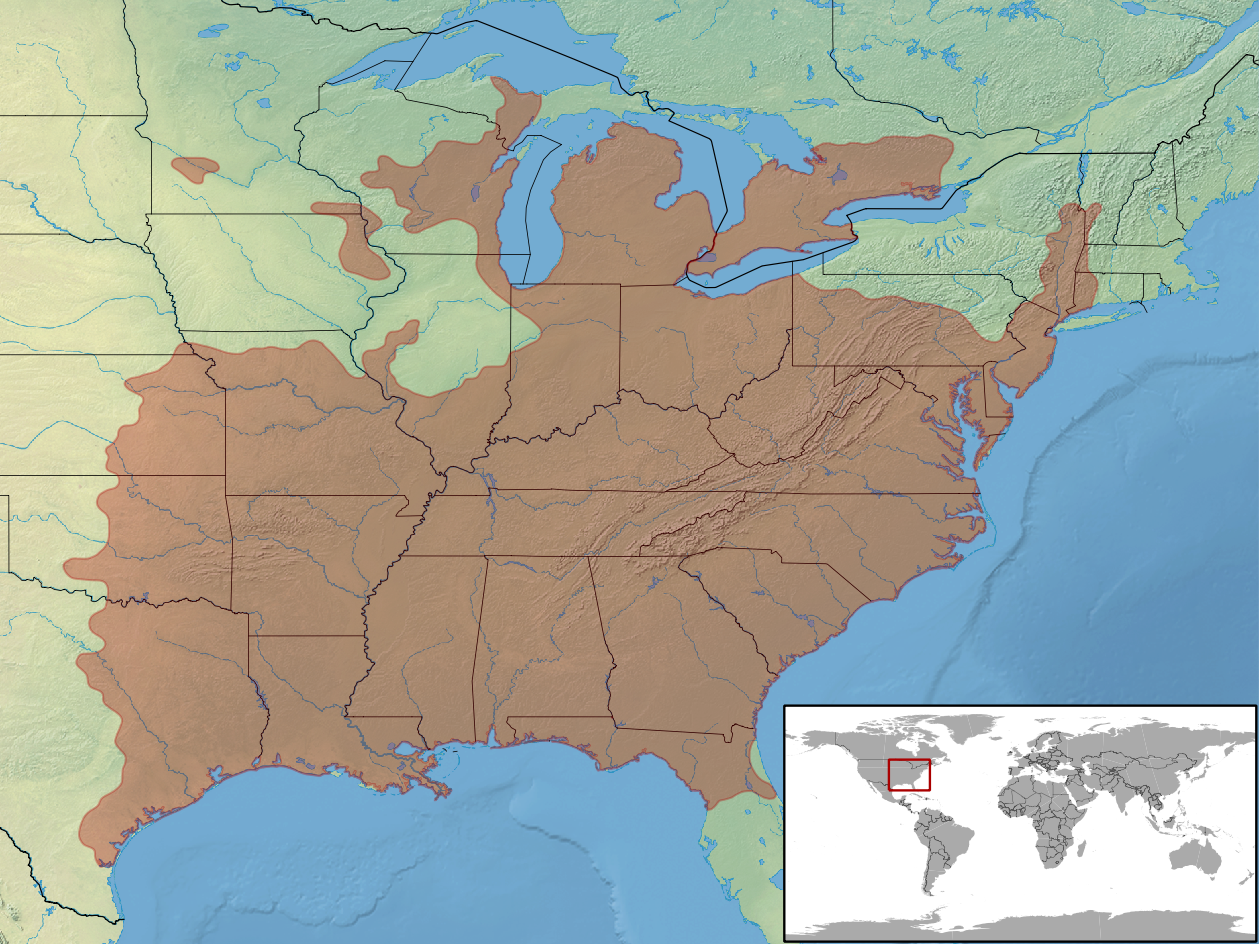

Synonyms
- Lacerta fasciata Linnaeus, 1758; ? Lacerta quinquelineata Linnaeus, 1766; Plestiodon fasciatus — Baird, 1849; Eumeces quinquelineatus — Boulenger, 1887; Eumeces fasciatus — Heilprin, 1888; Plestiodon fasciatus — Stejneger & Barbour, 1917; Eumeces fasciatus — Taylor, 1936; Plestiodon fasciatus — Schmitz et al., 2004

= Plestiodon fasciatus =

Species of reptile

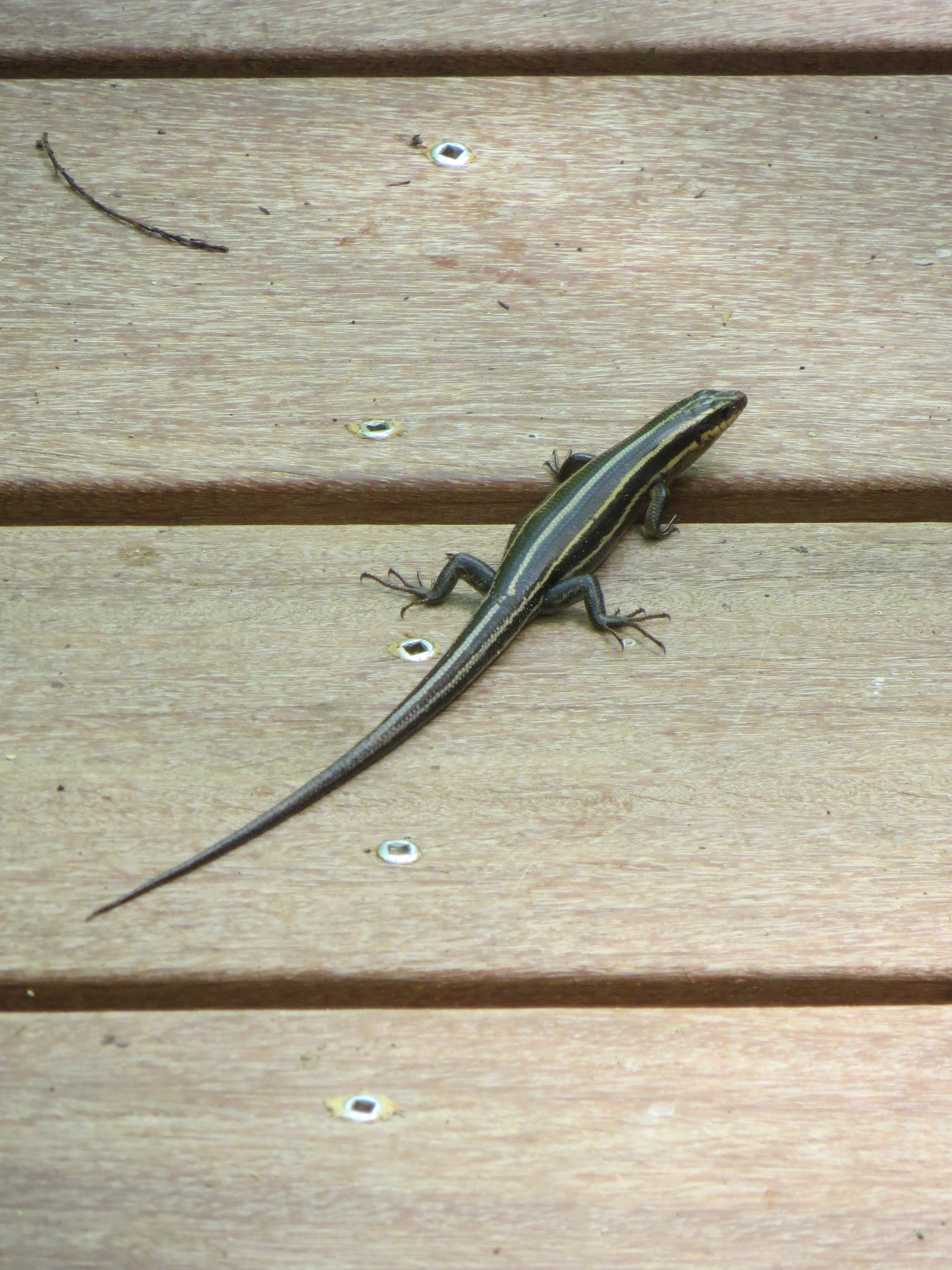
Plestiodon fasciatus on boardwalk at Francis Beidler Forest

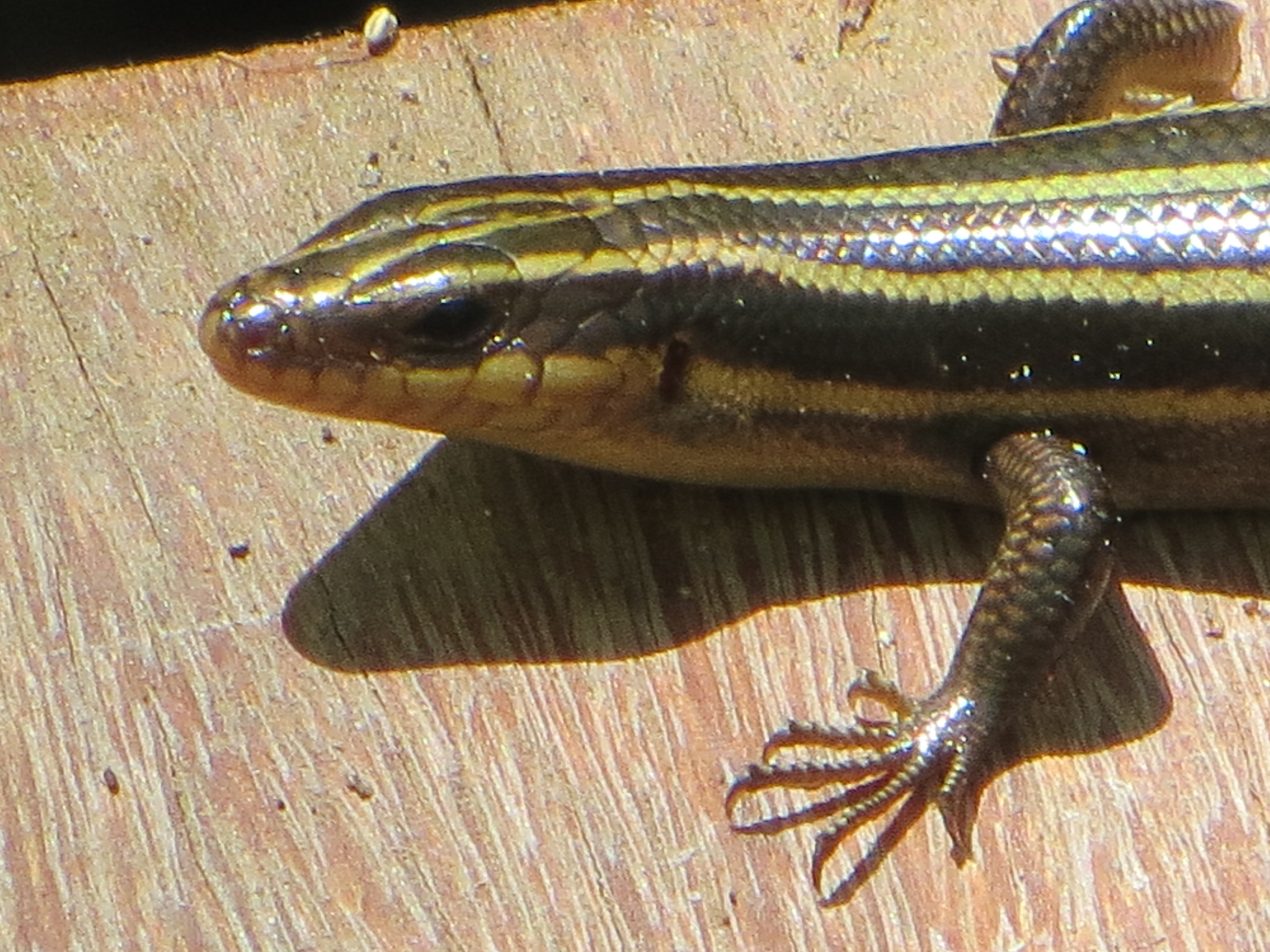
Detail of head

The (American) five-lined skink (Plestiodon fasciatus) is a species of lizard in the family Scincidae. The species is endemic to North America. It is one of the most common lizards in the Eastern United States and one of the five native species of lizards in Canada.

== Common names ==
Other common names for P. fasciatus include blue-tailed skink (for juveniles) and red-headed skink (for adults). It is technically appropriate to call it the American five-lined skink to distinguish it from the African skink Trachylepis quinquetaeniata (otherwise known as five-lined mabuya) or the eastern red-headed skink to distinguish it from its western relative Plestiodon skiltonianus (otherwise known as the western skink). The blue-tailed skink proper is Cryptoblepharus egeriae from Christmas Island, but in North America the juveniles of any Eumeces or Plestiodon species may be called this.

== Description ==
The American five-lined skink is small to medium-sized, growing to about 12.5 to 21.5 centimetres (4.9 to 8.5 in) total length (including tail). Young American five-lined skinks are dark brown to black with five distinctive white to yellowish stripes running along the body and a bright blue tail. The blue color fades to light blue with age, and the stripes also may slowly disappear. Females however, are more likely to retain the blue tail color as they age. The dark brown color fades, too, and older individuals are often uniformly brownish. The southeastern five-lined skink, P. inexpectatus, of the Southeastern United States is very similar to this species and there is some overlap in range. The two species can be distinguished by their scales. The broad-headed skink, P. laticeps, is similar, and may be difficult to distinguish from P. fasciatus. The former species usually lacks the two enlarged postlabial scales characteristic of P. fasciatus. Adult male broad-headed skinks, with their large size and swollen red head, are readily distinguished from P. fasciatus. Research suggests that they are sexually dimorphic in terms of size. The males are often larger than the females, but this depends on the area they live. Their claws are short and curved downward; they make a right angle at the axis of each toe.

== Geographic range ==
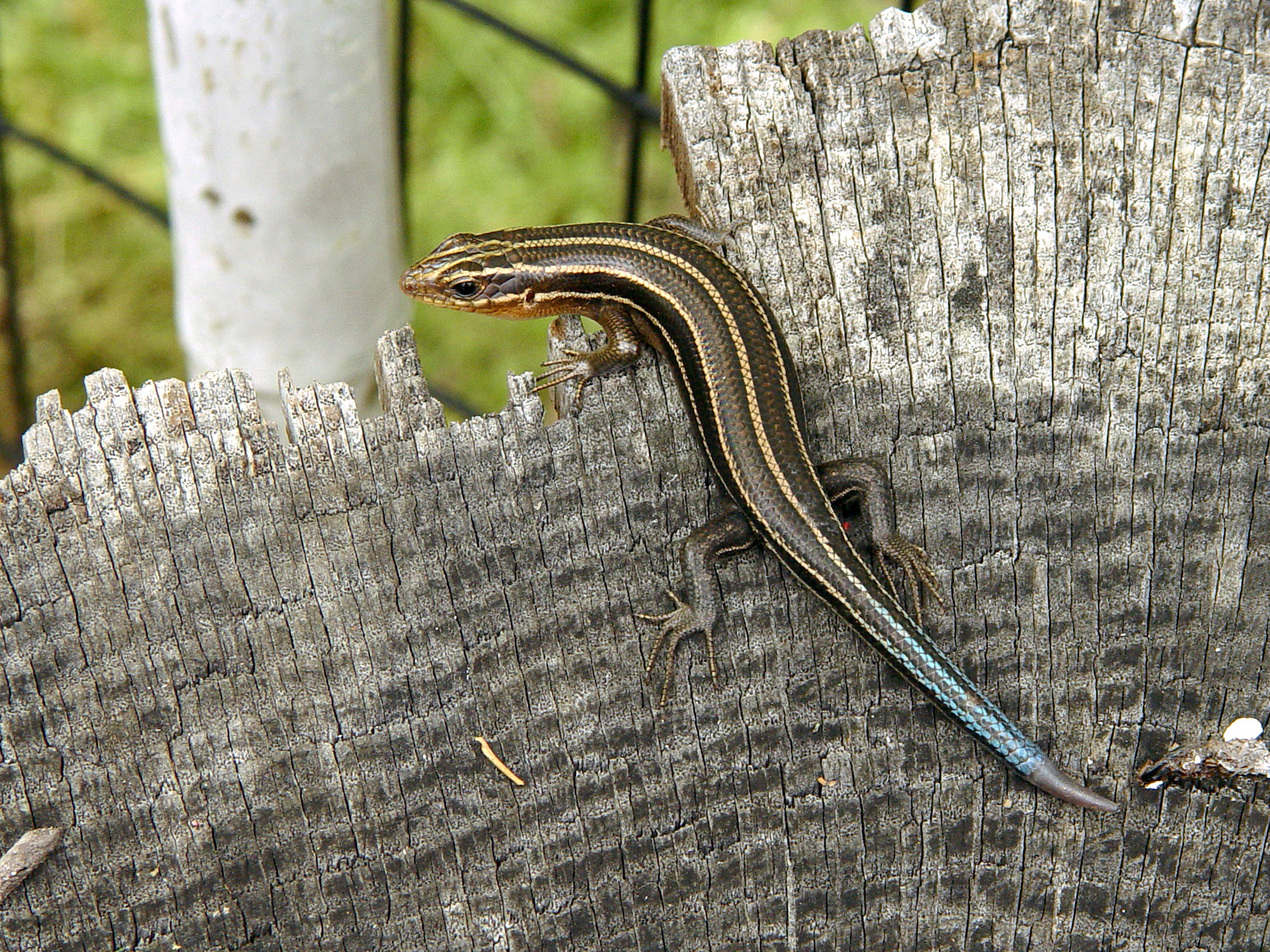
Subadult with partly regrown tail pictured in parkland in Memphis, Tennessee

The range of the American five-lined skink extends in the north to southern Ontario, Michigan and eastern New York. The western border is in Minnesota, Missouri and eastern Kansas, Nebraska, Oklahoma, Florida, Mississippi, Louisiana, Tennessee and Texas. P. fasciatus tends to be most abundant on the coastal plain in the southeastern United States and along the Gulf Coast. It has now been seen in increasing numbers in the northern Chesapeake Bay Region of Maryland particularly along the shores of the Elk River, and northern Virginia. It has also been seen in northern South America, such as Colombia.

== Habitat ==
The American five-lined skink is a ground-dwelling animal. It prefers moist, hardwood areas with a permanent water source such as rivers or streams, as well as sites to bask in the sun. It can also be found in broken, rocky areas at the northern edge of its habitat. Within the northern edge of its habitat, it was found that they prefer areas with longer than average rock cover in areas with few trees. Also within its northern range, P. fasciatus abundance is negatively impacted by canopy closure, herbaceous cover, and shrub density. While little is known about any hibernation patterns, P. fasciatus is rarely seen throughout winter and the surrounding months. It is assumed by scientists that they are sheltered and dormant under rocks, logs, or leaves provided by the hardwood areas it inhabits. They are resistant to minor disturbances, but can be affected by the removal of woody debris in their northern habitats.

== Reproduction ==
Fertilization in the American five-lined skink is internal, with eggs laid by the female between the middle of May and July, at least one month after mating. Males will mate with multiple females. The mating season begins in May. The female Plestiodon will lay its eggs in June, and four to six weeks after the incubation, the young hatch. Thus the birthing process consists of laying eggs and external incubation. Fertilization occurs shortly after copulation, unlike many other lizard species Plestiodon fasciatus females are unable to store sperm between successive clutches. One study found that most clutches had multiple sires, but within those clutches, there was unequal sharing of paternity. Polyandry is an integral part to the mating system of Common Five-Lined Skinks.

Females lay fifteen to eighteen eggs in a small cavity cleared beneath a rotting log, stump, board, loose bark, a rock, or an abandoned rodent burrow. Females prefer secluded nest sites in large, moderately decayed logs. Soil moisture is also an important factor in nest selection. Females often place nests in regions where soil moisture is higher than in adjacent areas. Vertical position of the nest also varies with moisture, with nests located deeper in a soil cavity at dry sites. Even when nesting sites are not limited, a significant amount of aggregation occurs.

The parchment-like eggs of the American five-lined skink, similar to many other reptiles, are thin and easily punctured. Freshly laid eggs range from spherical to oval in shape averaging 1.3 cm (0.51 in) in length. Absorption of water from the soil leads to increased egg size. Egg coloration also changes over time, from white to mottled tan, after contact with the nest burrow. The incubation period ranges from 24 to 55 days, and varies due to fluctuations in temperature. Females typically brood their eggs during this time, exhibiting defensive behavior against smaller predators. Parental care ends a day or two after hatching when hatchlings leave the nest. Young American five-lined skinks, with a potential life span of up to six years, attain sexual maturity and begin reproducing within two to three years of hatching.

== Behavior ==
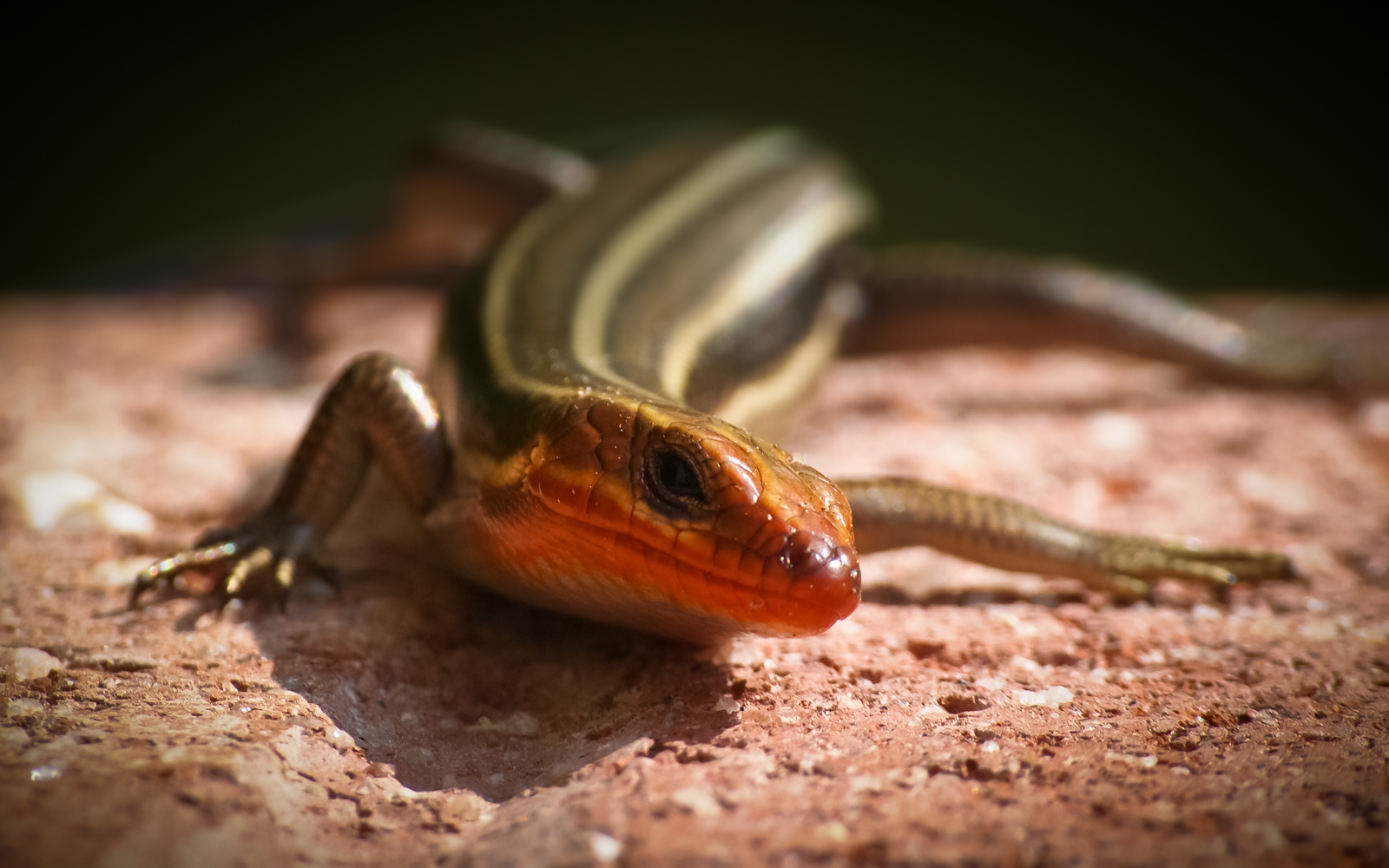
Closeup of face

Adult male American five-lined skinks exhibit complex courtship and aggressive behavior. Although males tolerate juveniles and females in their territories, they actively defend these areas against other males. It has been proposed that one of the functions of their blue tails is intraspecific communication with the purpose of preventing attacks by more aggressive males because the blue tail signifies that they are juveniles or females. Juvenile five-lined skinks show aggressive behavior to other juveniles but only when they are within one body length of each other. Vomeronasal analysis of chemical cues and recognition of sex-specific visual stimuli, including tail and body coloration, aid in the identification of sex. Evidence suggests that males may rely more on contact pheromones than volatile airborne molecules in the identification of conspecifics. Courting males grasp the necks of receptive females in their jaws after approaching them from the side. Using the tail to align cloacal openings, males initiate copulation by inserting one of the two hemipenes into the female's cloaca. Copulation events typically last four to eight minutes.

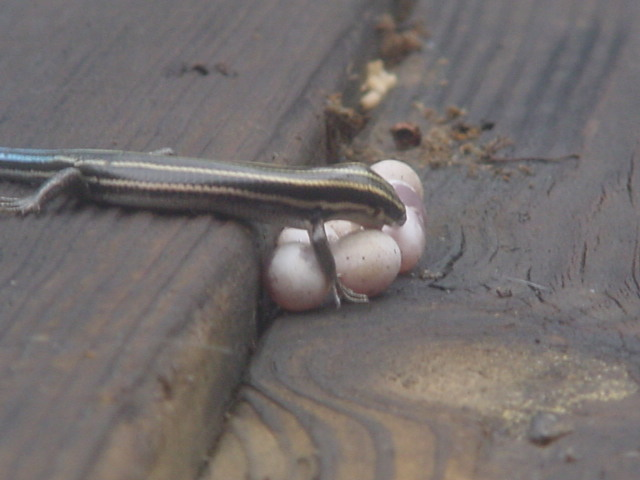
A female skink with its eggs

Female American five-lined skinks demonstrate high levels of parental care which reduces egg mortality. Females exhibit several brooding positions of variant contact levels with the body placed beside, over, through, or in a coil around the eggs. Brooding position varies according to soil moisture. Maternal body contact increases at lower moisture levels potentially reducing the transpirational loss of the eggs. In communal nests, females may alternate foraging and guarding of the nests, leaving eggs protected at all times. Females may also urinate in the nests and turn eggs to maintain humidity. In addition, females transfer heat from basking through body contact. Any eggs displaced from the nest are retrieved by head or snout rolling, and rotten eggs are eaten.

American five-lined skinks also exhibit antipredation behavior. In evasion of various predators including snakes, crows, hawks, shrews, moles, opossums, skunks, raccoons, and domestic cats, skinks may disconnect their entire tail or a small segment. It is thought that the bright blue color attracts predators to the expendable tail. Skinks run to shelter to escape their death as the disconnected tail continues to twitch. Skinks may also utilize biting as a defensive strategy.

== Diet ==
The common five-lined skink's diet consists primarily of a variety of arthropods, particularly spiders, crickets, beetles and other insects. However, they have been reported to also eat newborn mice, frogs, and other lizards. Wild skinks will make short forays into heavily used core areas to find food. Those who own a pet skink are advised to supplement the skink's diet with fruits and vegetables. In addition to eating insects, skinks enjoy a variety of fruits and vegetables. Fruits that skinks enjoy include blueberries, mangos, raspberries, papayas, cantaloupes, strawberries, and figs. Studies have indicated that the five-lined skink's diet consists mostly of invertebrates whose numbers are plenty, but because of the skink's voracious diet, its predation may be a major ecological factor.

== Conservation status ==
The Great Lakes - St. Lawrence population of P. fasciatus is listed as "special concern" in Ontario and Canada by COSSARO and COSEWIC. It is illegal to remove any of the three species of skinks found in Canada from their habitats. Skinks are at the extreme edge of their habitat range in Canada, which makes it an area of special interest to ecologists, as extreme conditions place unique evolutionary pressures upon species. The American five-lined skink has split into two phylogenetically-distinct populations in this edge habitat; the Carolinian population, also present in the United States, ends around Point Pelee National Park in southern Ontario. The Carolinian population is listed as "endangered" in Ontario and Canada by COSSARO, COSEWIC, The St. Lawrence / Great Lakes population resides in the Ottawa Valley in eastern Ontario and tends to be more tolerant to sparse or rocky conditions than its sister subspecies.

== Captive care ==
American five-lined skinks can be maintained in captivity with minimal care. Some U.S. states impose general restrictions on taking reptiles including native American five-lined skinks from the wild without a permit or hunting license, for example Maryland (no more than 4 may be possessed without a permit), Indiana and Ohio.

A pair of skinks may live in a 25-30 US gallon terrarium, and may live for 5–10 years with adequate care.

== Photo gallery ==
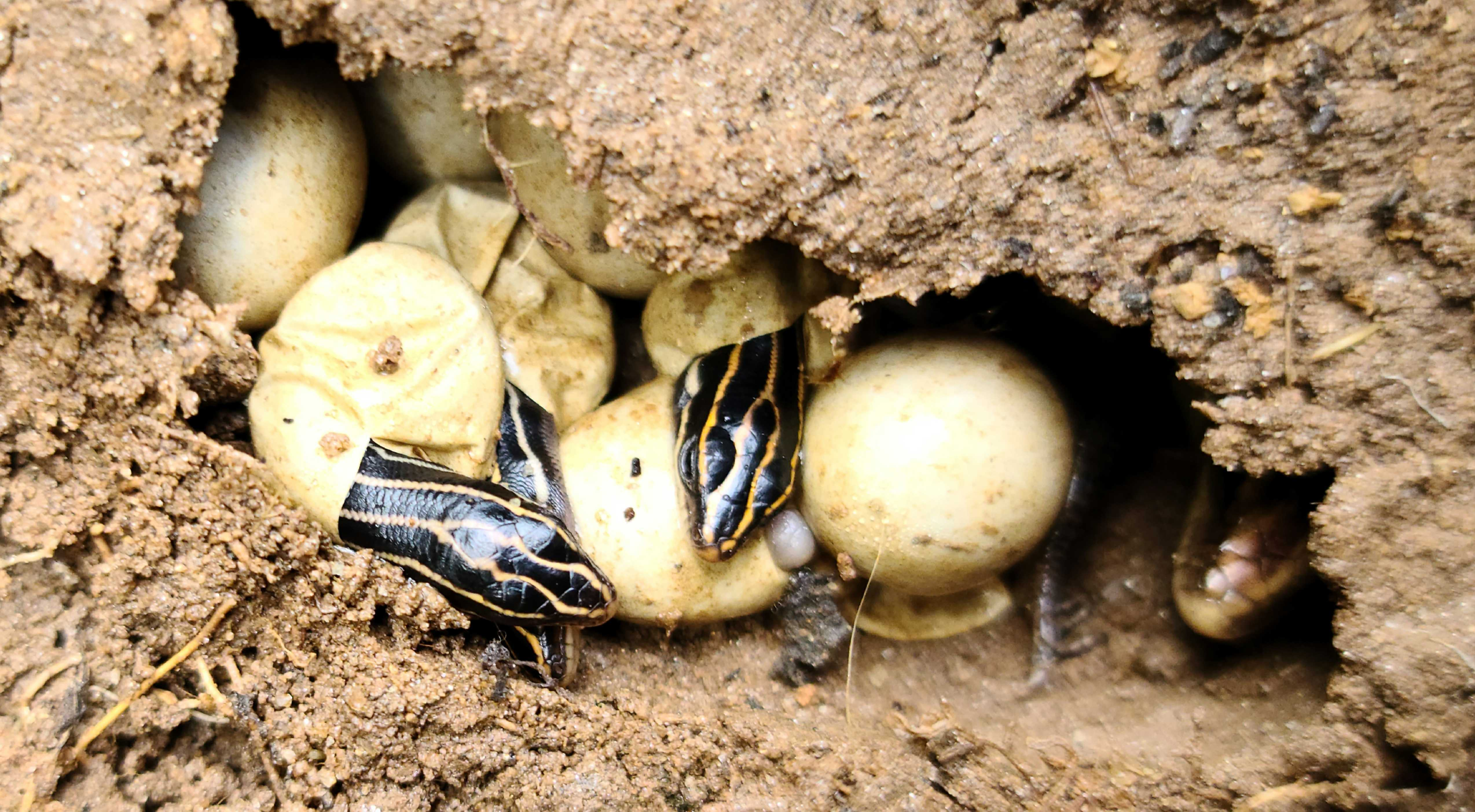
Clutch of eggs hatching

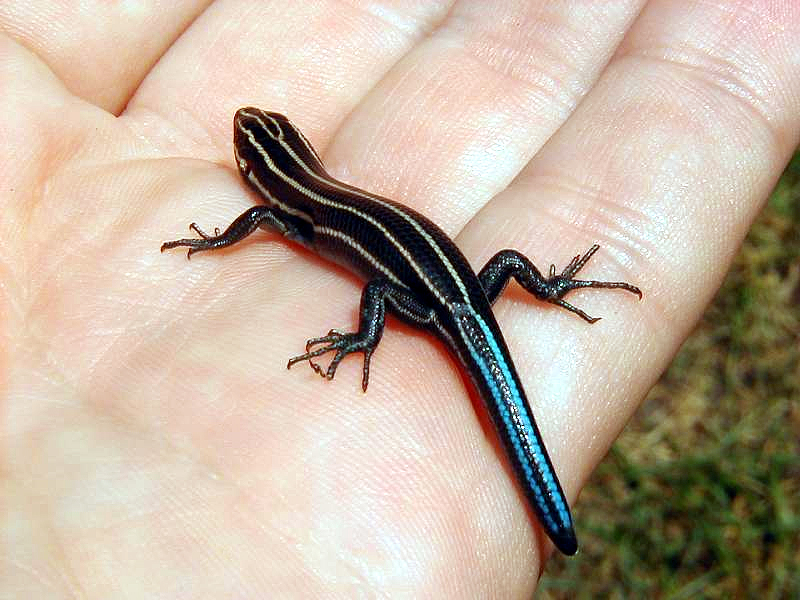
Part of the tail regrowing

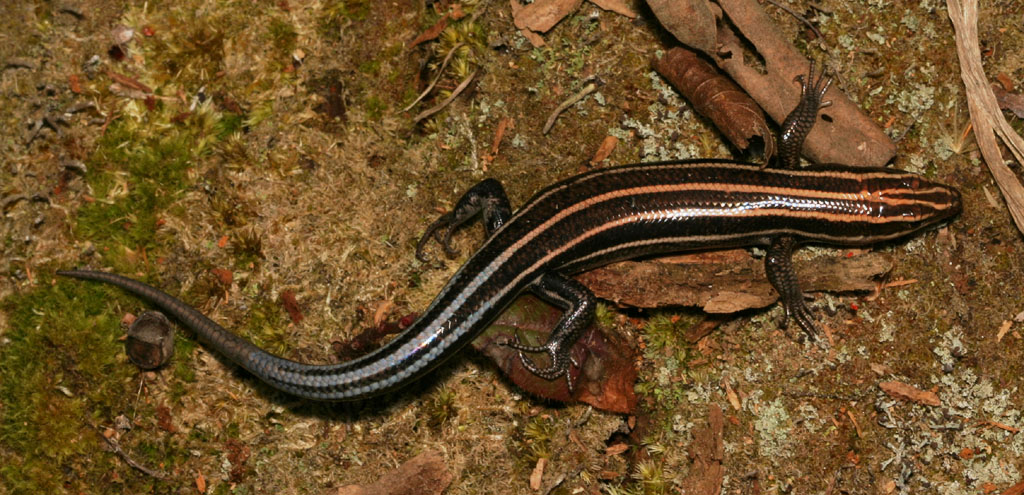
Female or sub-adult male, dorsal view

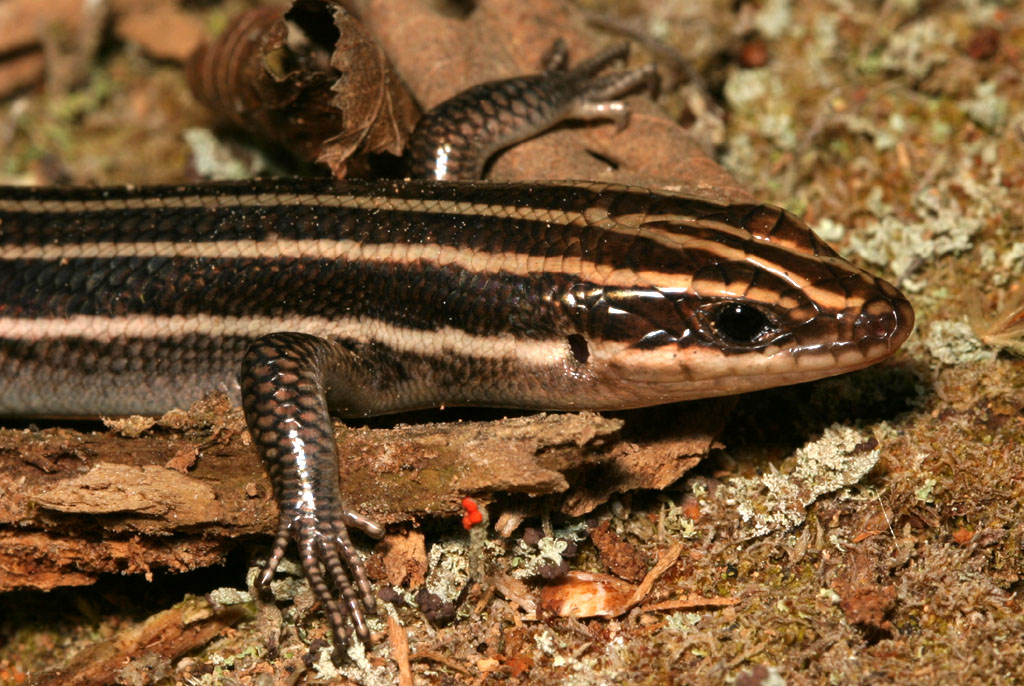
Head, showing two enlarged postlabial scales, diagnostic for this species compared to P. laticeps

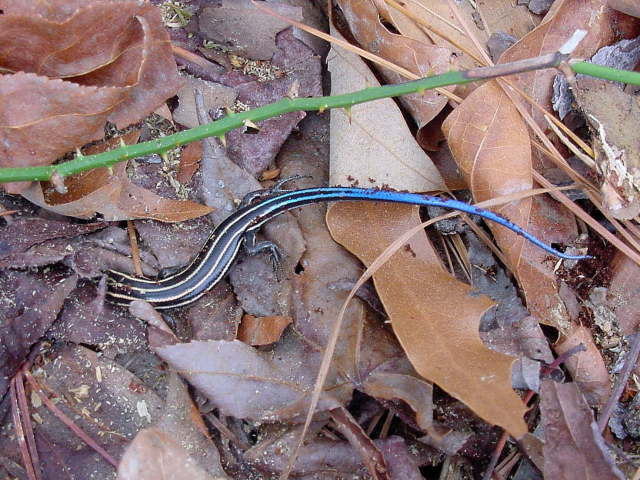
View of the tail

Juvenile with a still vivid blue tail

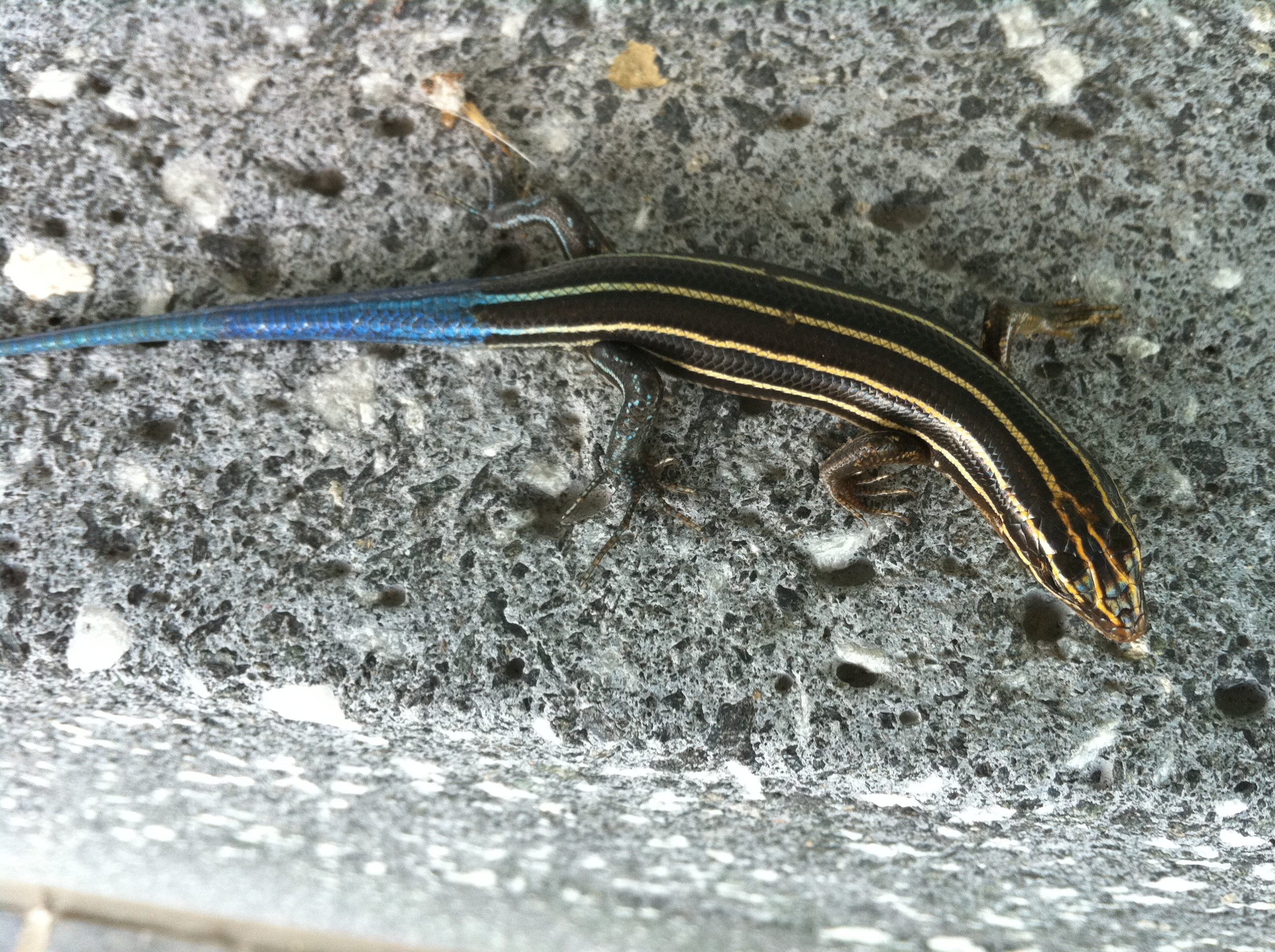
Juvenile on the side of a man-made structure

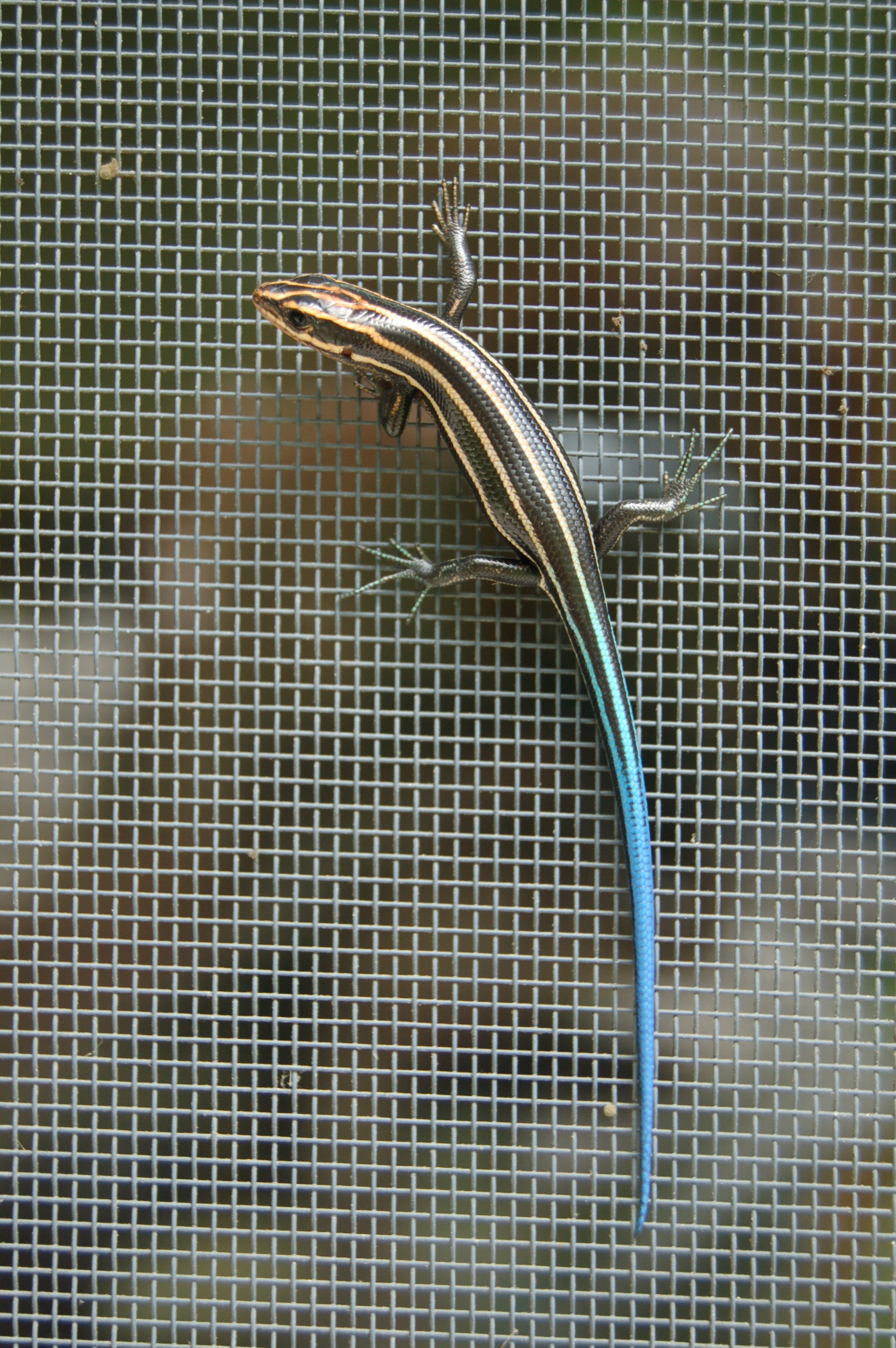

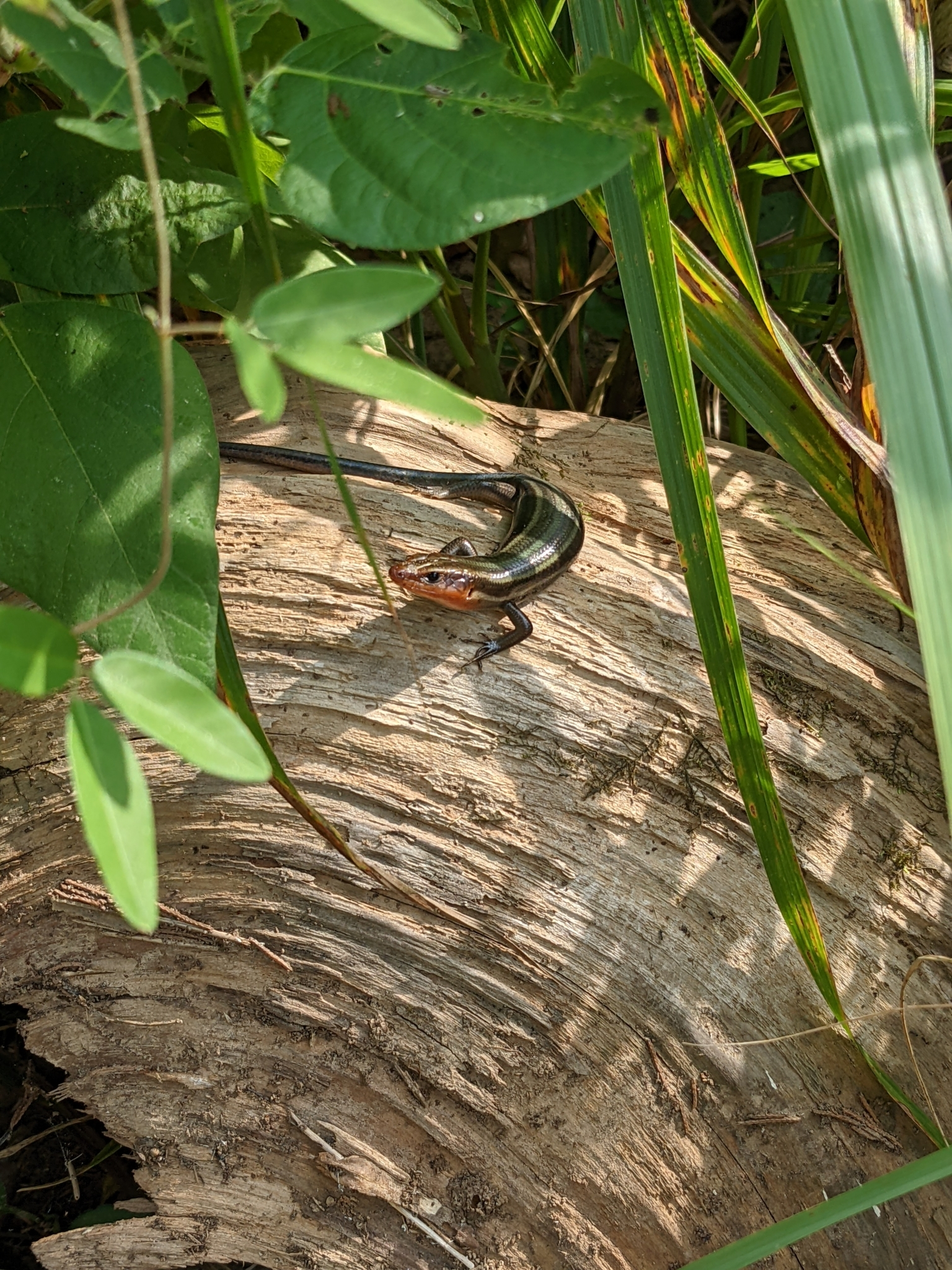

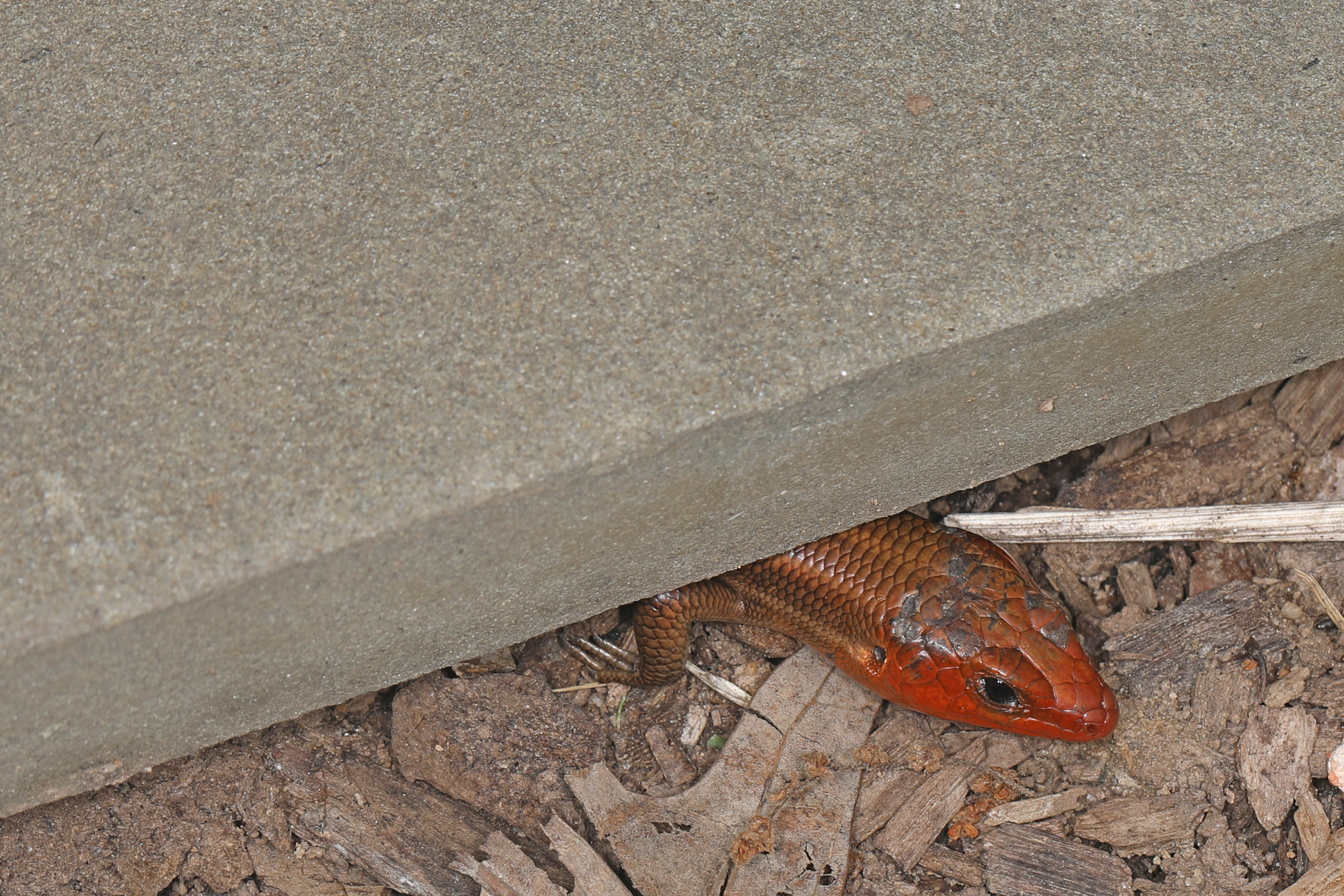

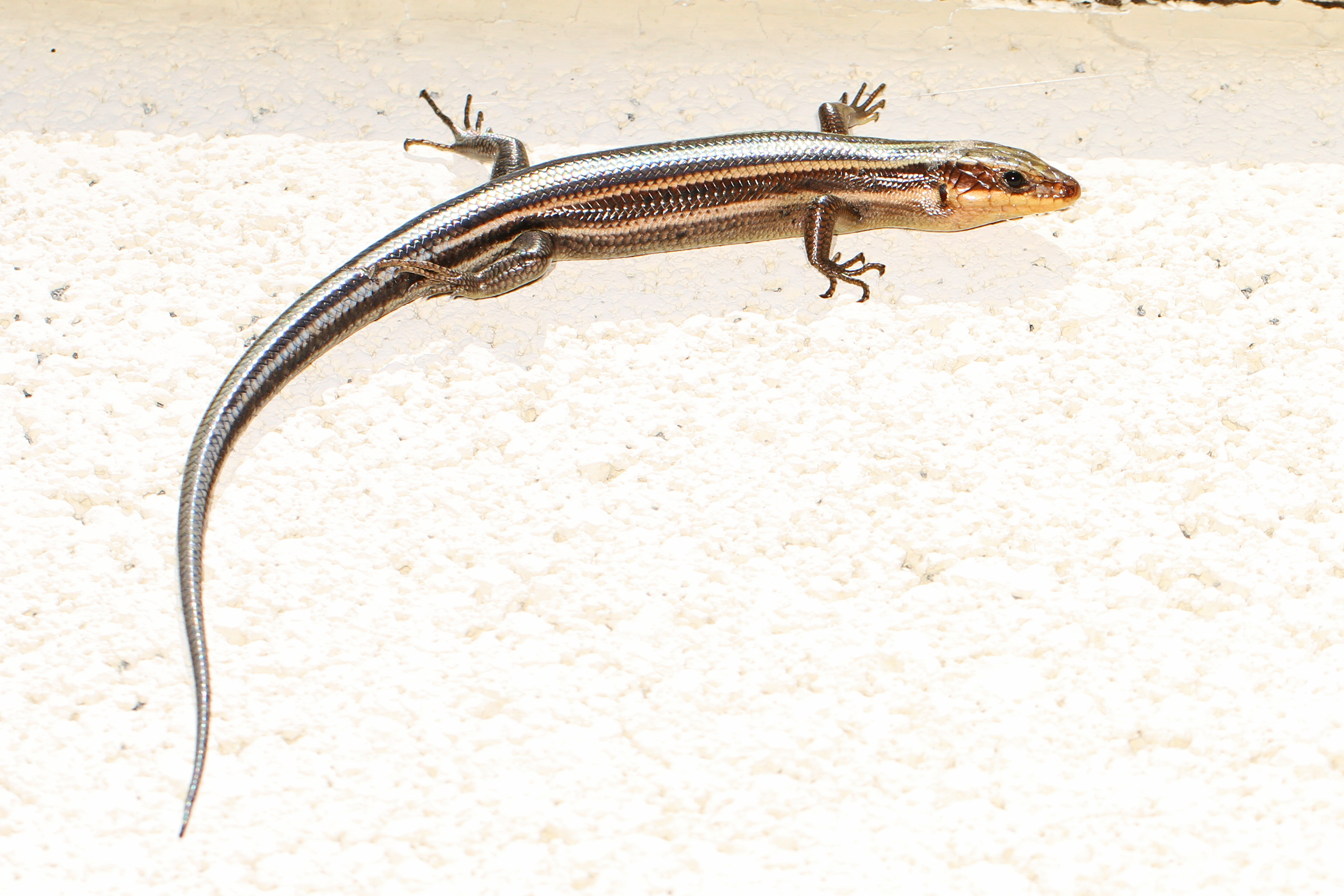

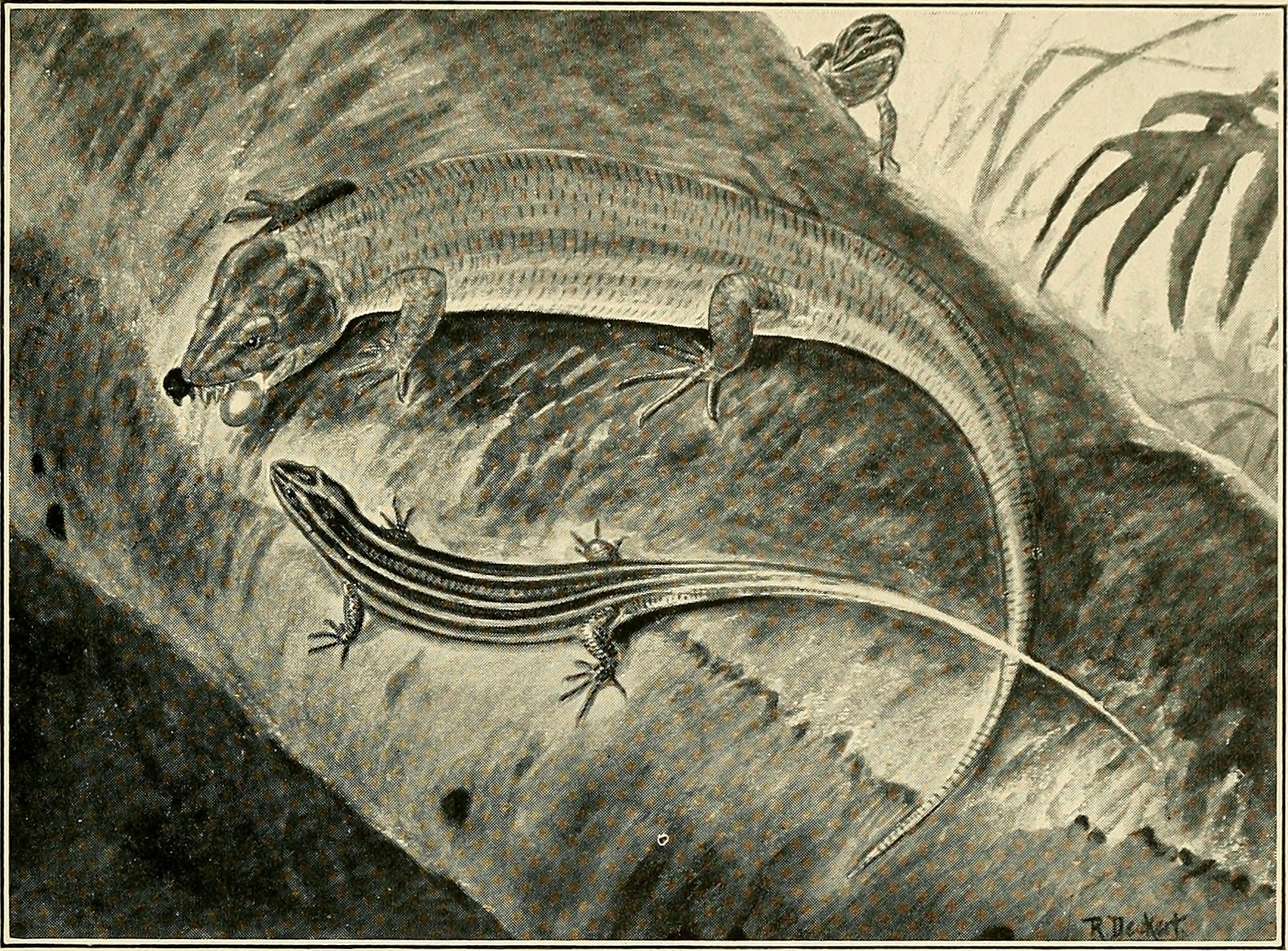

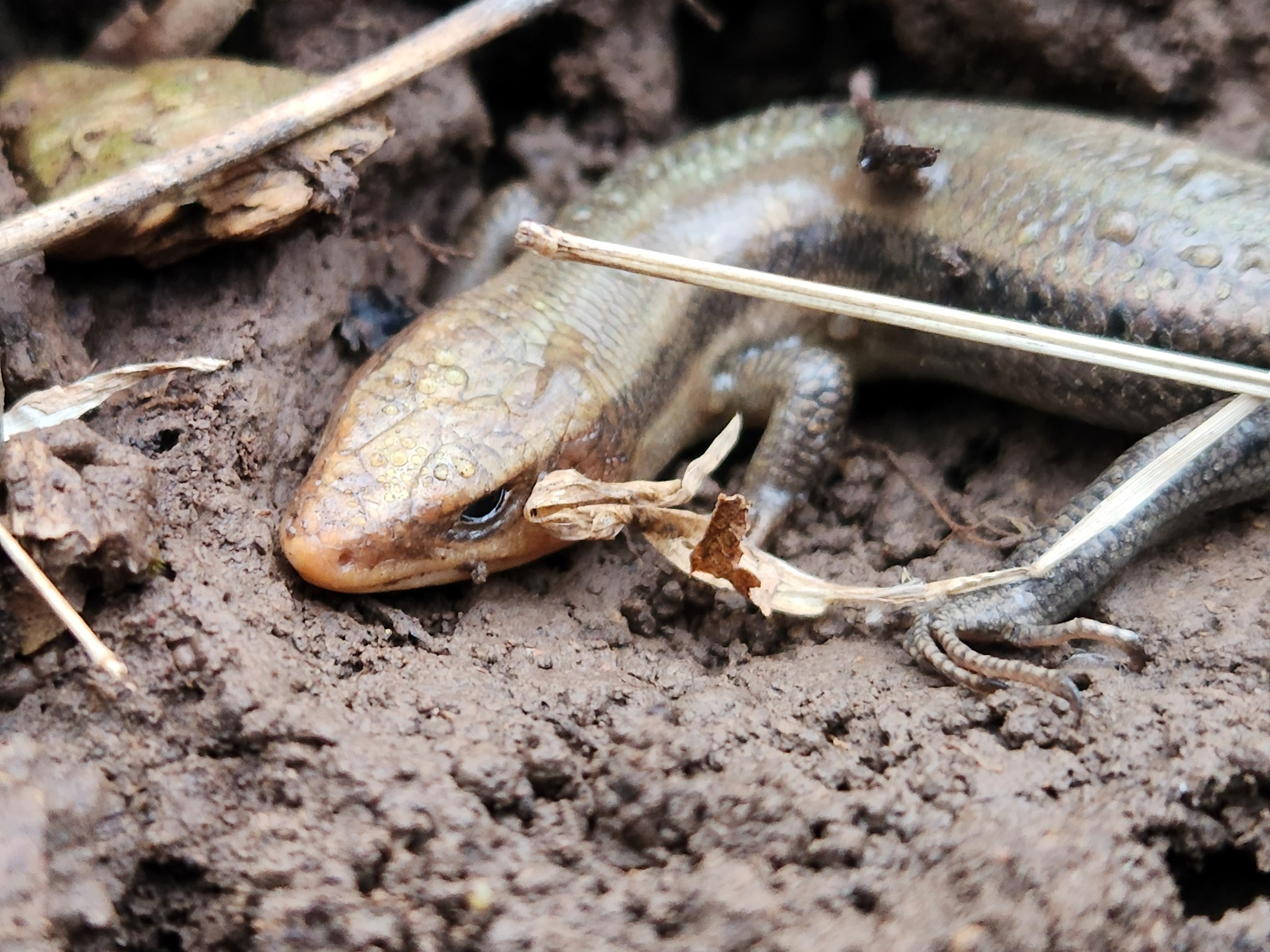

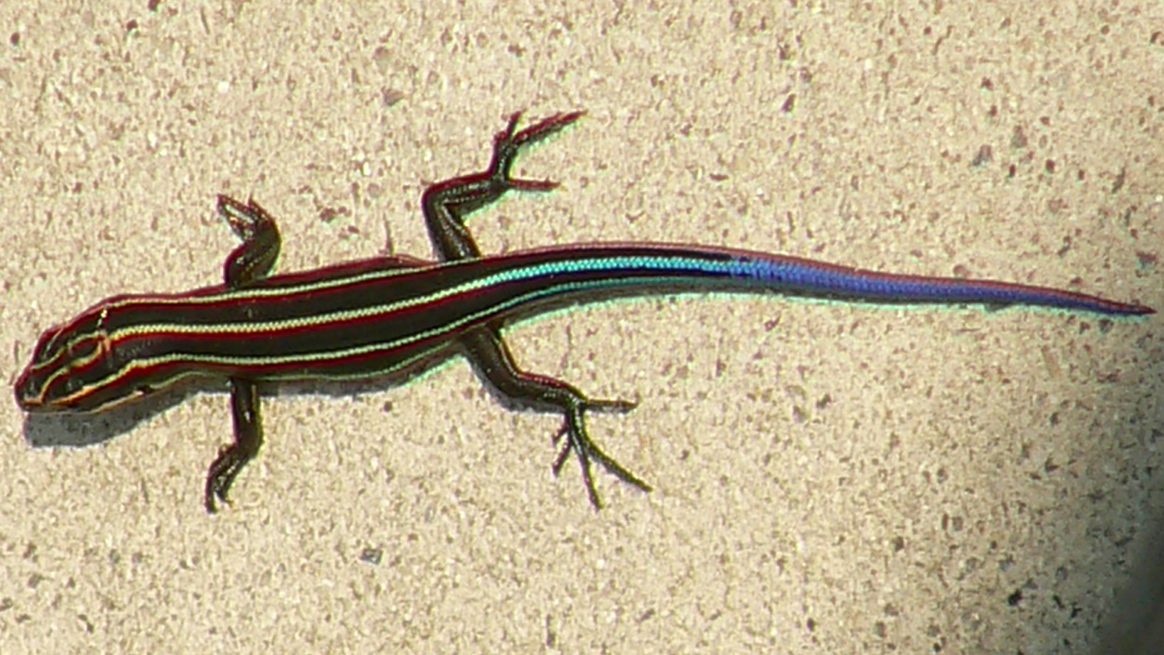
At Cape May, NJ

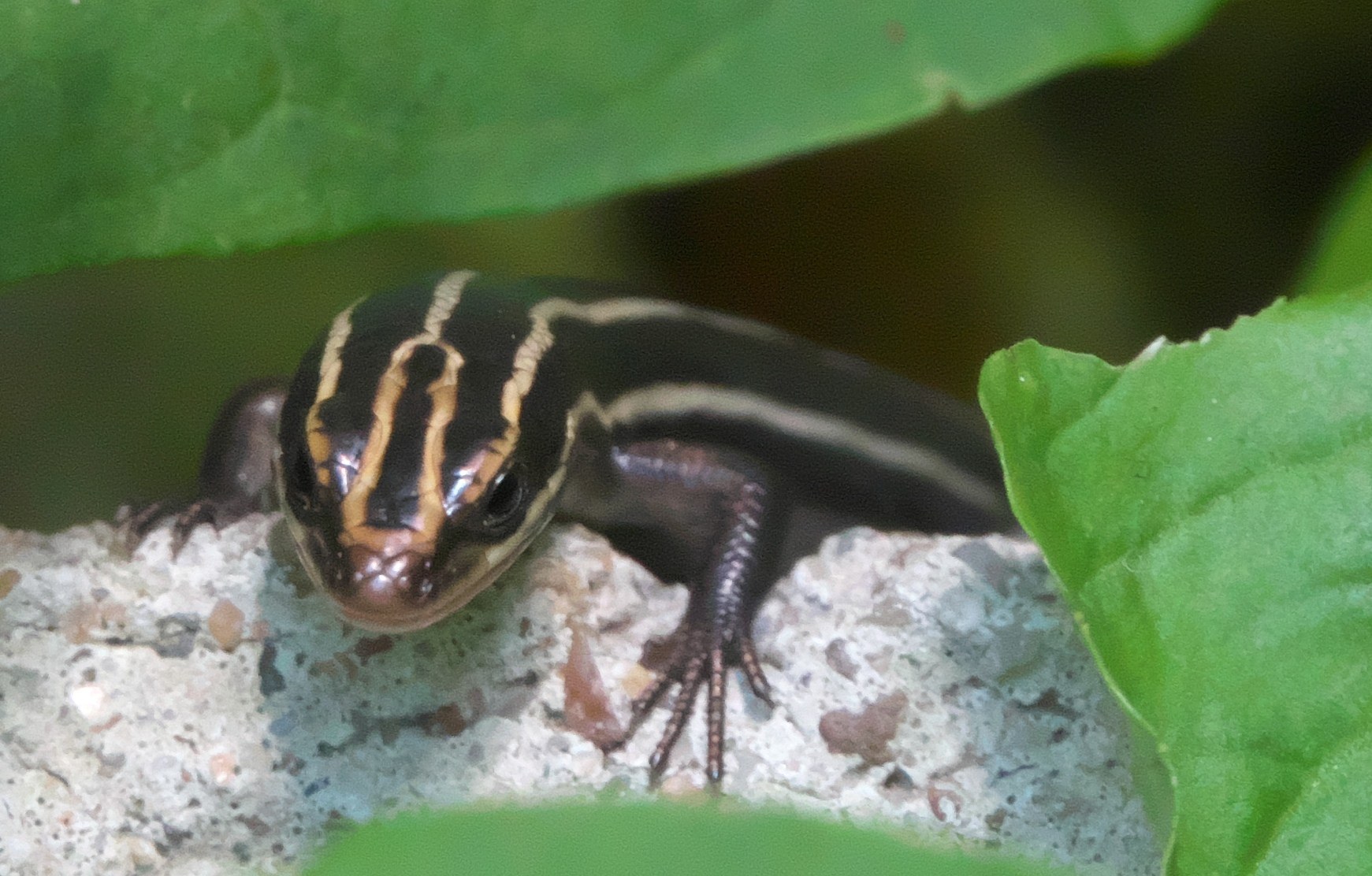

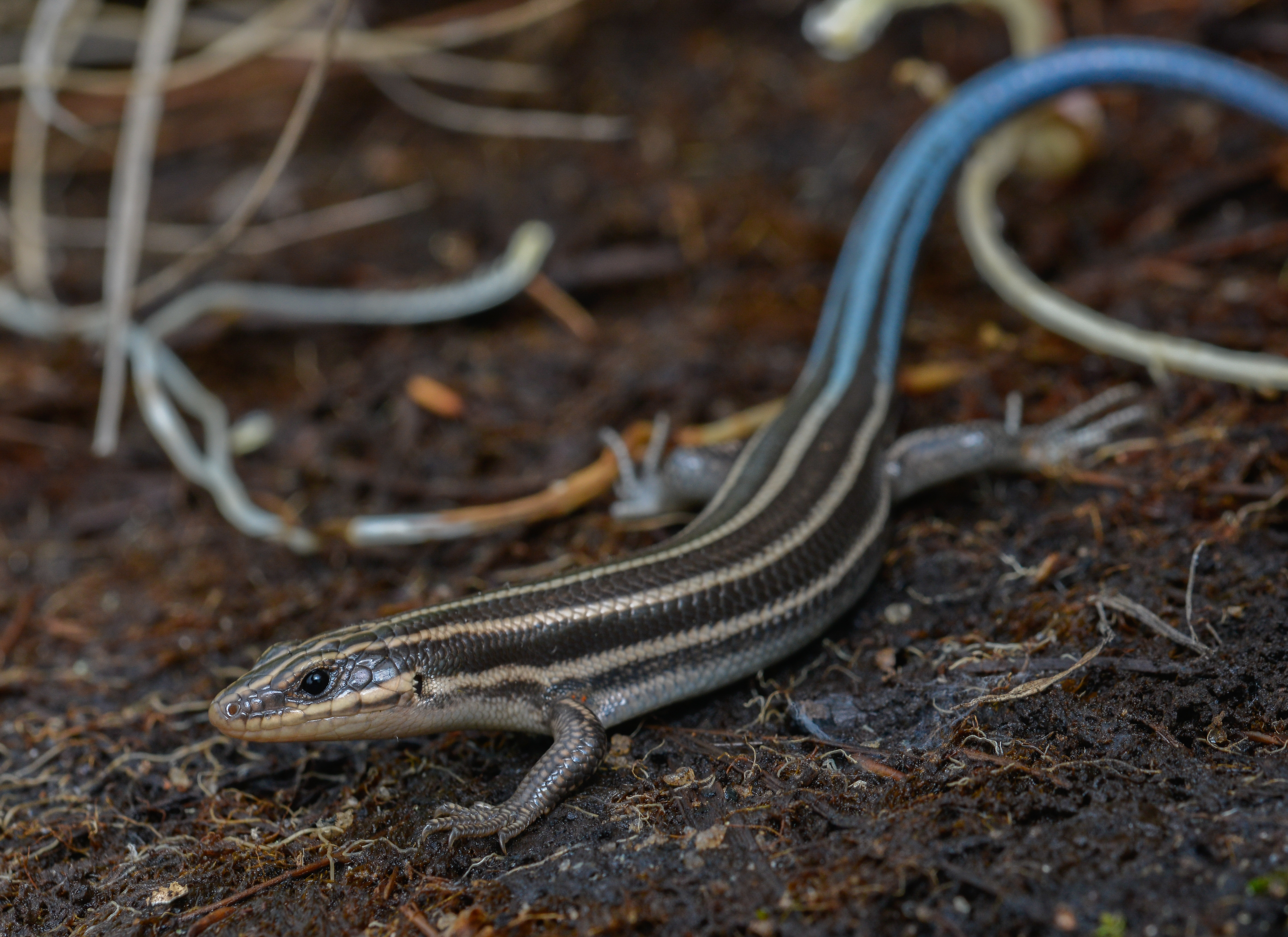

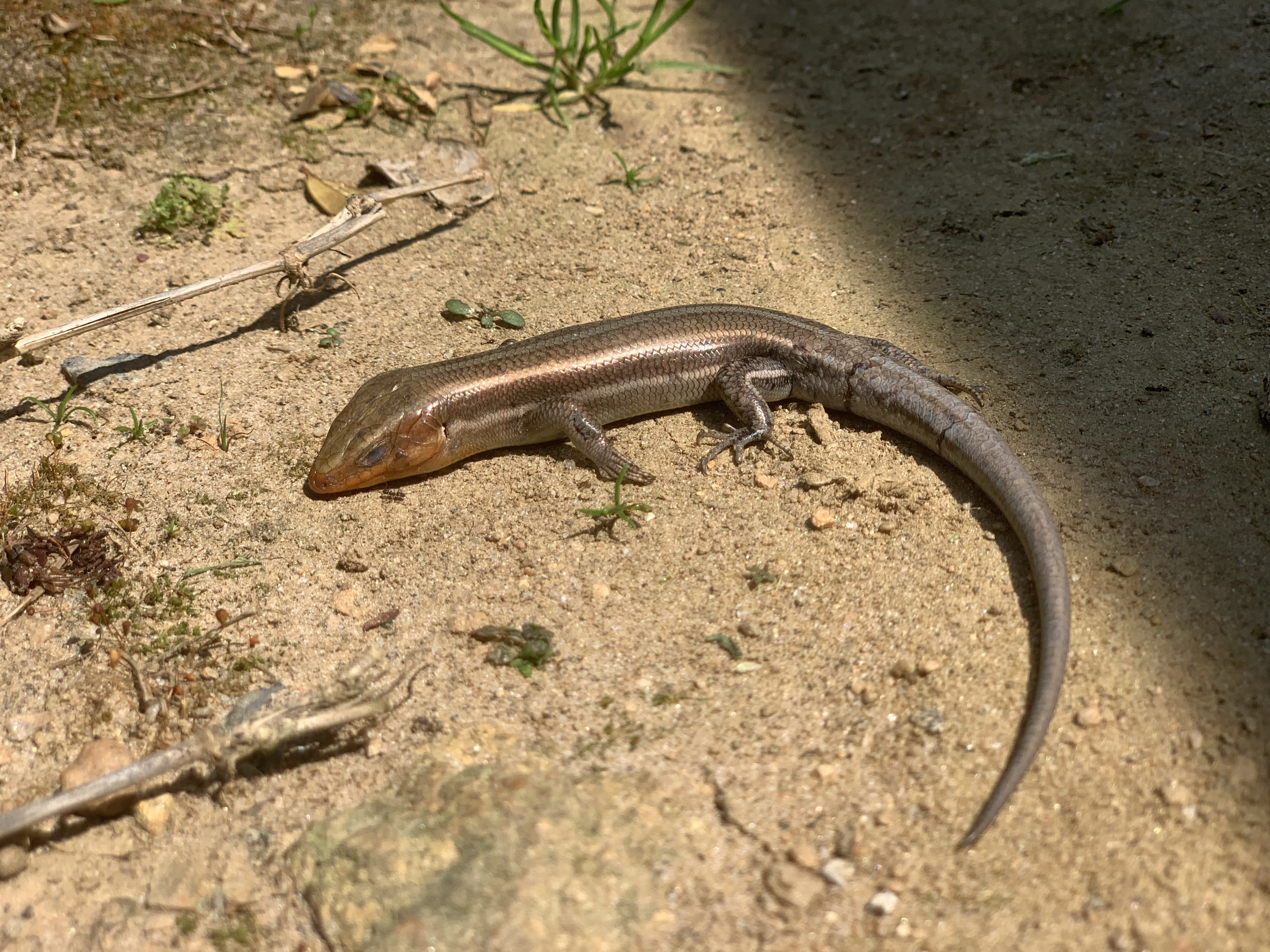

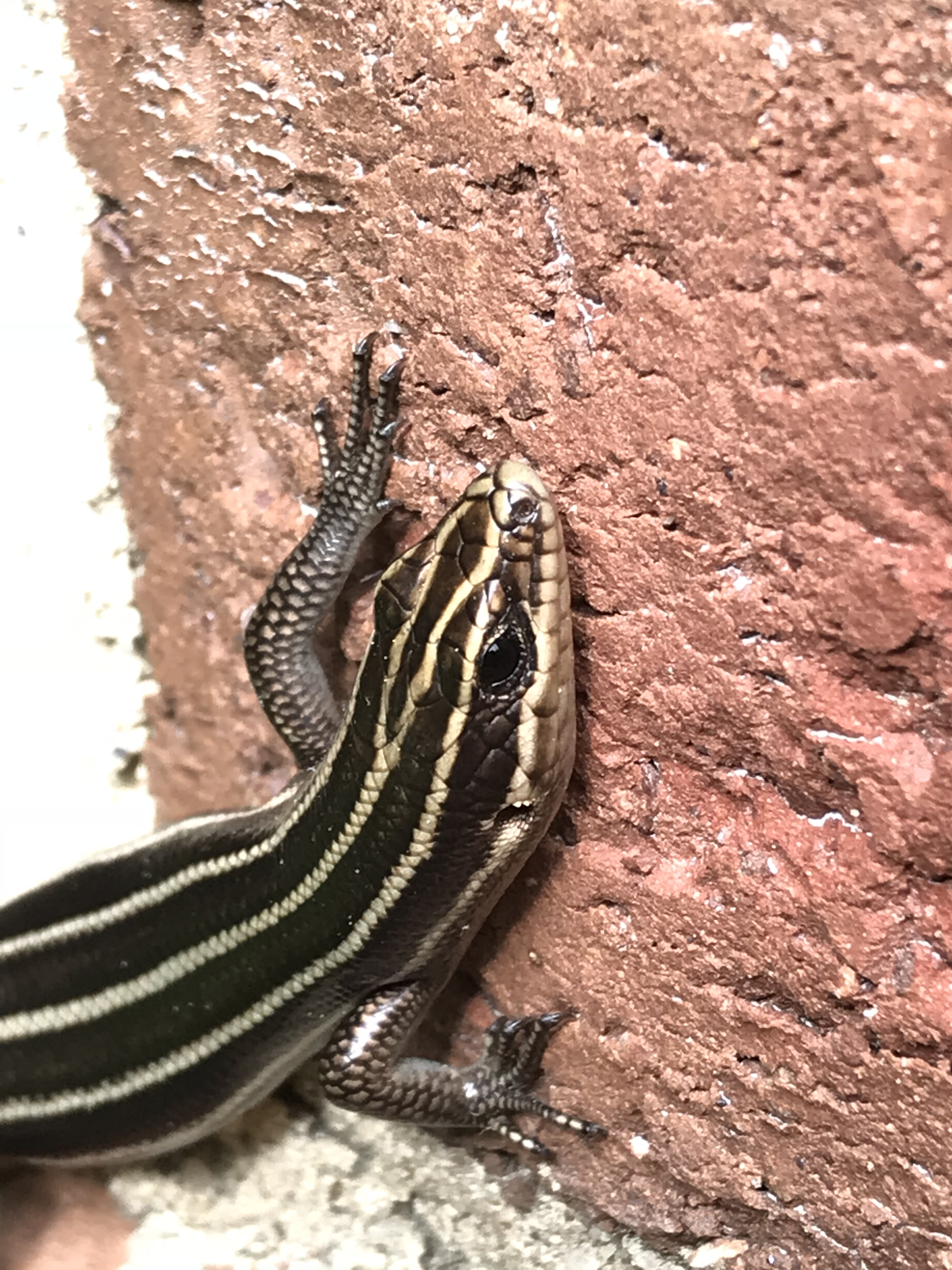
