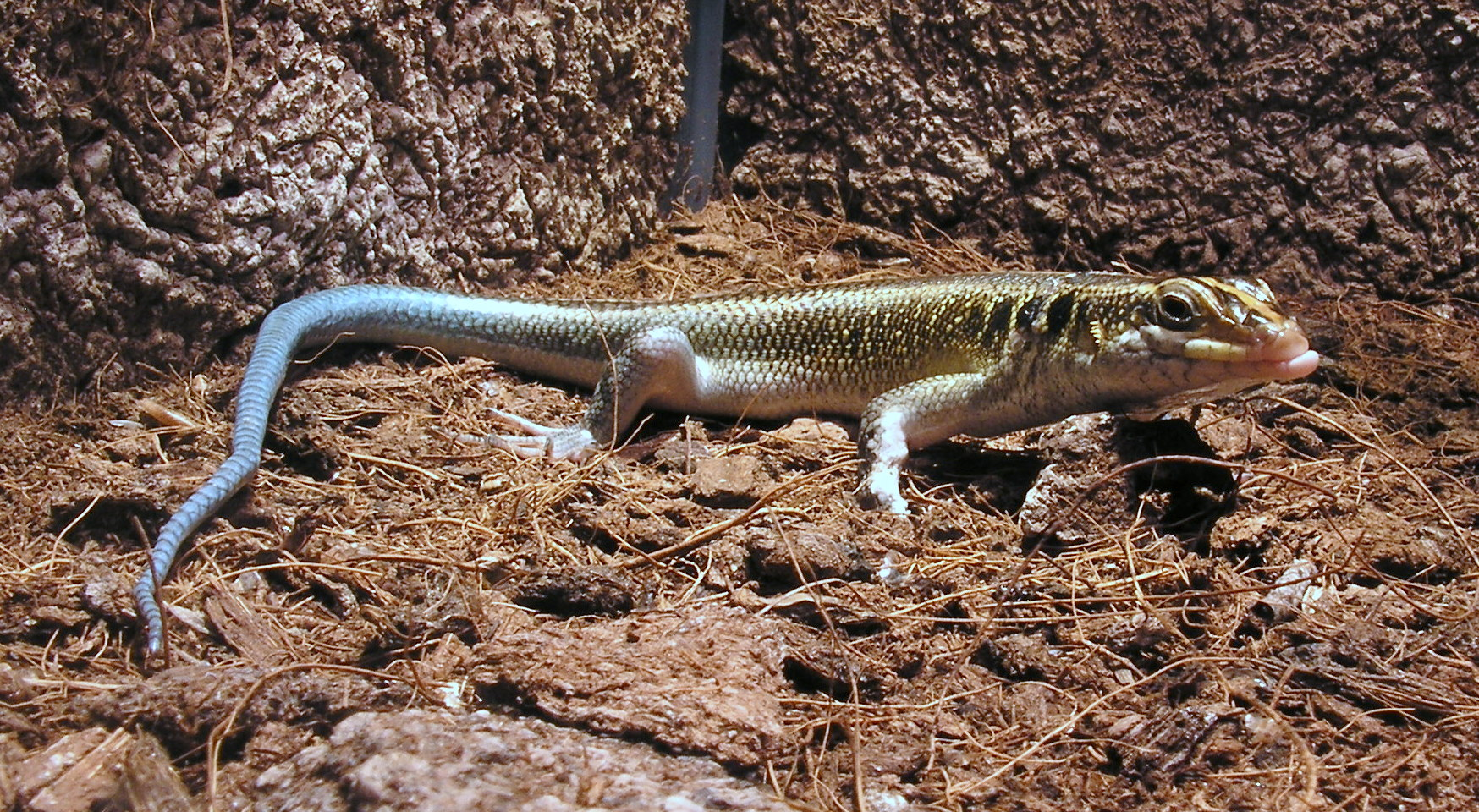

Scientific classification
- Domain: Eukaryota
- Kingdom: Animalia
- Phylum: Chordata
- Class: Reptilia
- Order: Squamata
- Family: Scincidae
- Genus: Trachylepis
- Species: T. quinquetaeniata

Binomial name
- Trachylepis quinquetaeniata (Lichtenstein, 1823)

Synonyms
- Mabuya quinquetaeniata

= Trachylepis quinquetaeniata =

Species of lizard

The African five-lined skink (Trachylepis quinquetaeniata, formerly Mabuya quinquetaeniata), or rainbow mabuya, is a north-central African species of skink lizard.

T. margaritifera is another closely related skink species that is also called the "rainbow skink" (although it occurs primarily in Eastern Africa); T. margaritifera, overall, possesses more colourful, "rainbow"-like scales (as opposed to the predominantly blue, black and yellowish five-lined skink, T. quinquetaeniata).

== Taxonomy ==
The African five-lined skink has two subspecies:

- Trachylepis quinquetaeniata quinquetaeniata (Lichtenstein, 1823)
- Trachylepis quinquetaeniata riggenbachi (Sternfeld, 1910)

Trachylepis margaritifera, formerly treated as a subspecies of T. quinquetaeniata, was elevated to full species status in 1998.

== Description ==
Trachylepis quinquetaeniata is a smaller- to medium-sized lizard, maturing to a length of about 20 centimetres (7.9 in). The colour of this skink is quite variable, depending on the lizard's gender, its age and the time of the year. As with most skinks, its scales are glossy, shiny, and the body is rather smooth to the touch, with a 'metallic', reflective quality. The base scale colouration is usually olive-brown or dark brown, sometimes with small, pearly-whitish spots, with three light-olive or dark-brown stripes running from the head to the bright, electric-blue tail. These stripes may fade and become indistinct with age.

The head features a pointed snout and clearly visible ear openings. Just behind the ears are usually small, black spots. The limbs are darker black or brown, short and strong, with relatively long toes. The flanks are mainly yellowish or beige, and the underside of the body is whitish. Their overall appearance is quite similar to several types of North American, blue-tailed and striped skinks, such as Plestiodon skiltonianus (also known as the western, the five-lined or the blue-lined skink, or Coronado's skink).

== Distribution ==
The species is found from Egypt to Mali in Northern Africa, and its range stretches southwards into Southern Africa. It has been found in many countries and territories across the African continent; it is also considered an invasive species in Florida.

=== Captivity ===
The African five-lined skink is occasionally found in private collections and in the reptile and pet trade, though its popularity is fairly minimal; the species is not nearly as popular as other pet reptiles or lizard species, such as crested or leopard geckos, or blue-tongued skinks. Still, it is believed that a group of escapee or released pet skinks—likely containing some gravid females—are responsible for sightings in Florida and, recently, Southern California; their effects on the endemic species of American five-lined skinks is not yet well-understood.

== Habitat ==
These skinks are found in both rocky and grassland habitats. They tend to make their homes on trees, but also can be found using manmade structures for this purpose.

== Behavior ==
=== Diet ===
This species' preferred prey are invertebrates, mainly arthropods, such as various ants, beetles, butterflies, crickets, flies, grasshoppers, moths, spiders, termites and occasional worms or larvae, with few to no differences between the diets of males and females.
