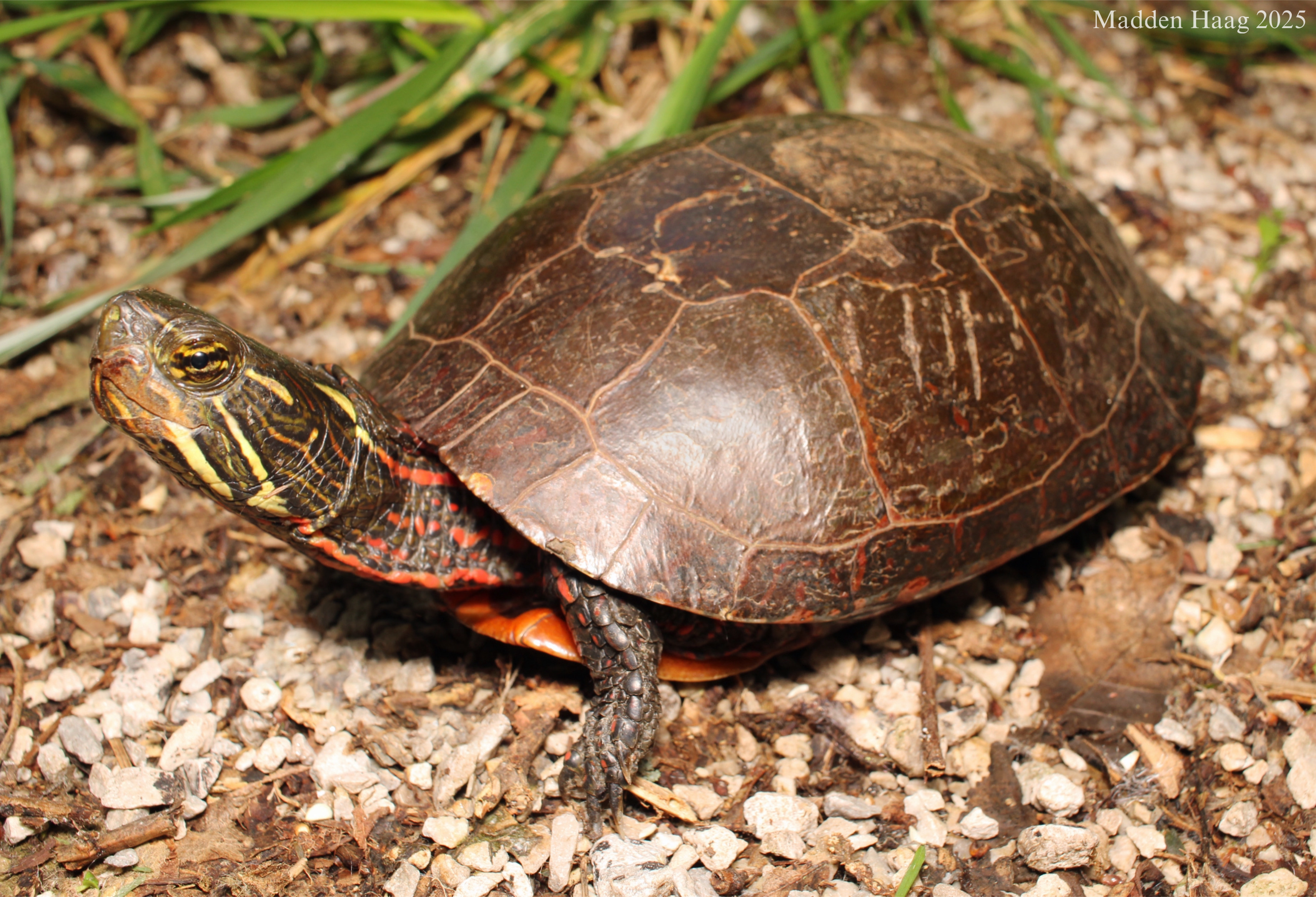
- Painted turtle (Chrysemys picta)

Conservation status
- Least Concern (IUCN 3.1)

Scientific classification
- Kingdom: Animalia
- Phylum: Chordata
- Class: Reptilia
- Order: Testudines
- Suborder: Cryptodira
- Family: Emydidae
- Subfamily: Deirochelyinae
- Genus: Chrysemys
- Species: C. picta

Binomial name
- Chrysemys picta (Schneider, 1783)

Subspecies
- C. p. bellii C. p. marginata C. p. picta
- Yellow: Eastern (C. p. picta) Orange: Midland (C. p. marginata); Blue: Southern (C. dorsalis); Red: Western (C. p. bellii)

Synonyms
- Species synonymy: Testudo picta Schneider, 1783; Chrysemys cinerea Bonnaterre, 1789; Emys bellii Gray, 1831; Emys oregoniensis Harlan, 1837; Chrysemys picta Gray, 1856; Chrysemys marginata Agassiz, 1857; Chrysemys dorsalis Agassiz, 1857; Chrysemys nuttalli Agassiz, 1857; Chrysemys pulchra Gray, 1873; Chrysemys trealeasei Hurter, 1911; Subspecies synonymy Chrysemys picta picta: Testudo picta Schneider, 1783; Testudo cinerea Bonnaterre, 1789; Emys cinerea Schweigger, 1812; Emys picta Schweigger, 1812; Clemmys picta Wagler, 1830; Terrapene picta Bonaparte, 1831; Chrysemys picta Gray, 1856; Chrysemys cinerea Boulenger, 1889; Clemmys cinerea Strauch, 1890; Chrysemys [cinerea] cinerea Siebenrock, 1909; Chrysemis picta Kallert, 1927; Chrysemys picta picta Bishop & Schmidt, 1931; Chrysema picta Chan & Cohen, 1964; Pseudemys picta Arnold, 2002; Chrysemys picta bellii: Emys bellii Gray, 1831; Clemmys (Clemmys) bellii Fitzinger, 1835; Emys oregoniensis Harlan, 1837; Chrysemys bellii Gray, 1844; Emys originensis Gray, 1844 (ex errore); Emys oregonensis LeConte, 1854 (ex errore); Emys origonensis Gray, 1856 (ex errore); Chrysemys nuttalii Agassiz, 1857; Chrysemys oregonensis Agassiz, 1857; Clemmys oregoniensis Strauch, 1862; Chrysemys nuttallii Gray, 1863 (ex errore); Chrysemys orbigniensis Gray, 1863; Chrysemys pulchra Gray, 1873; Emys belli Günther, 1874 (ex errore); Chrysemys cinerea var. bellii Boulenger, 1889; Chrysemys belli Ditmars, 1907; Chrysemys treleasei Hurter, 1911; Chrysemys marginata bellii Stejneger & Barbour, 1917; Chrysemys bellii bellii Ruthven, 1924; Chrysemys picta bellii Bishop & Schmidt, 1931; Chrysemys picta belli Mertens, Müller & Rust, 1934; Chrysemys belli belli Pickwell, 1948; Chrysemys nuttalli Schmidt, 1953 (ex errore); Chrysemys picta bollii Kuhn, 1964 (ex errore); Chrysemys trealeasei Ernst, 1971 (ex errore); Chrysemys trealeasi Smith & Smith, 1980 (ex errore); Chrysemys picta dorsalis: Chrysemys dorsalis Agassiz, 1857; Clemmys picta var. dorsalis Strauch, 1862; Chrysemys cinerea var. dorsalis Boulenger, 1889; Chrysemys marginata dorsalis Stejneger & Barbour, 1917; Chrysemys bellii dorsalis Ruthven, 1924; Chrysemys picta dorsalis Bishop & Schmidt, 1931; Chrysemys picta marginata: Chrysemys marginata Agassiz, 1857; Clemmys marginata Strauch, 1862; Chrysemys marginata marginata Stejneger & Barbour, 1917; Chrysemys bellii marginata Ruthven, 1924; Chrysemys picta marginata Bishop & Schmidt, 1931

= Painted turtle =

Chrysemys picta Temporal range: 15–0 Ma Neogene–recent

Species of reptile

The painted turtle (Chrysemys picta) is North America's most widespread native turtle, with a rich evolutionary history that stretches back 15 million years. As resilient survivors belonging to the pond turtle family Emydidae, these turtles adapted creatively to the planet's changing climate. During the last Ice Age, they split into distinct groups and evolved into three regionally unique subspecies: the Eastern painted turtle (found along the Atlantic coast), the Midland painted turtle (living around the Great Lakes), and the Western painted turtle (the largest group, spanning the west coast and Canada). Scientists still debate whether a fourth group, the Southern painted turtle, is its own separate species or another subspecies. Because they are highly adaptable and widely distributed across fresh waters from Canada to Mexico, their conservation status is listed as Least Concern, meaning they are currently thriving in the wild.

It lives in relatively slow-moving fresh waters, from southern Canada to northern Mexico, and from the Atlantic to the Pacific. They have been shown to prefer large wetlands with long periods of inundation and emergent vegetation.

The adult painted turtle is 13–25 cm (5.1–9.8 in) long; the male is smaller than the female. The turtle's top shell is dark and smooth, without a ridge. Its skin is olive to black with red, orange, or yellow stripes on its extremities. The subspecies can be distinguished by their shells: the eastern has straight-aligned top shell segments; the midland has a large gray mark on the bottom shell; the western has a red pattern on the bottom shell.

The turtle eats aquatic vegetation, algae, and small water creatures including insects, crustaceans, and fish. Painted turtles primarily feed while in water and are able to locate and subdue prey even in heavily clouded conditions. Although they are frequently consumed as eggs or hatchlings by rodents, canines, and snakes, the adult turtles' hard shells protect them from most predators. However, they are still preyed on by animals such as foxes, raccoons, coyotes, and otters.

Reliant on warmth from its surroundings, the painted turtle is active only during the day when it basks for hours on logs or rocks. During winter, the turtle brumates, usually in the mud at the bottom of water bodies. This species is one of the few that is specially adapted to tolerate freezing temperatures for extended periods of time due to an antifreeze-like substance in their blood that keeps their cells from freezing.

The turtles mate in spring and autumn. Females dig nests on land and lay eggs between late spring and mid-summer. Hatched turtles grow until sexual maturity: 2–9 years for males, 6–16 for females.

In the traditional tales of Algonquian tribes, the colorful turtle played the part of a trickster. In modern times, four U.S. states (Colorado, Illinois, Michigan, and Vermont) have named the painted turtle their official reptile. While habitat loss and road killings have reduced the turtle's population, its ability to live in human-disturbed settings has helped it remain the most abundant turtle in North America. Adults in the wild can live for more than 55 years.

== Taxonomy and evolution ==
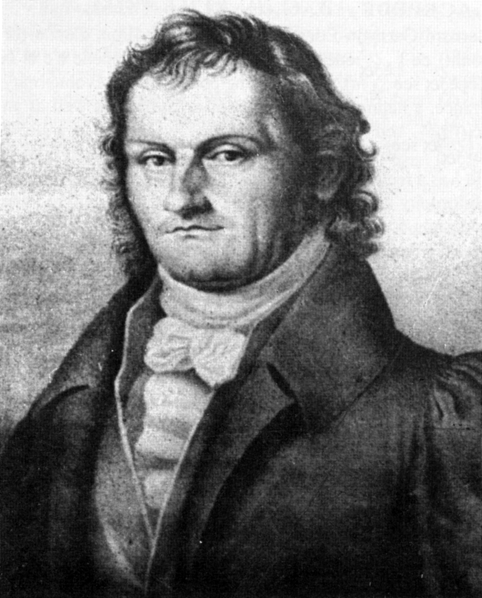
German naturalist Johann Gottlob Schneider first categorized the painted turtle.

The painted turtle (C. picta) is one of two species in the genus Chrysemys.

The parent family for Chrysemys is Emydidae: the pond turtles. Emydidae is split into two sub families; Chrysemys is part of the Deirochelyinae (Western Hemisphere) branch. The three subspecies of the painted turtle are the eastern (C. p. picta), midland (C. p. marginata), and western (C. p. bellii). The southern painted turtle (C. p. dorsalis) used to be considered a sub-species of C. picta, but is now generally considered a different species.

The painted turtle's generic name is derived from the Ancient Greek words for "gold" (chryso) and "freshwater tortoise" (emys); the species name originates from the Latin for "colored" (pictus). The subspecies name, marginata, derives from the Latin for "border" and refers to the red markings on the outer (marginal) part of the upper shell; dorsalis is from the Latin for "back", referring to the prominent dorsal stripe; and bellii honors English zoologist Thomas Bell, a collaborator of Charles Darwin. An alternate East Coast common name for the painted turtle is "skilpot", from the Dutch for turtle, schildpad.

Biologists have long debated the genera of closely related subfamily-mates Chrysemys, Pseudemys (cooters), and Trachemys (sliders). After 1952, some combined Pseudemys and Chrysemys because of similar appearance. In 1964, based on measurements of the skull and feet, Samuel B. McDowell proposed all three genera be merged into one. However, further measurements, in 1967, contradicted this taxonomic arrangement. Also in 1967, J. Alan Holman, a paleontologist and herpetologist, pointed out that, although the three turtles were often found together in nature and had similar mating patterns, they did not crossbreed. In the 1980s, studies of turtles' cell structures, biochemistries, and parasites further indicated that Chrysemys, Pseudemys, and Trachemys should remain in separate genera.

=== Classification ===
Originally described in 1783 by Johann Gottlob Schneider as Testudo picta, the painted turtle was called Chrysemys picta first by John Edward Gray in 1855. Four subspecies were then recognized: the eastern by Schneider in 1783, the western by Gray in 1831, and the midland and southern by Louis Agassiz in 1857, though the southern painted turtle is now generally considered a full species.

=== Subspecies ===
Although the subspecies of painted turtle intergrade (hybridize) at range boundaries they are distinct within the hearts of their ranges.

- The male eastern painted turtle (C. p. picta) is 13–17 cm (5–7 in) long, while the female is 14–17 cm (6–7 in). The upper shell is olive green to black and may possess a pale stripe down the middle and red markings on the periphery. The segments (scutes) of the top shell have pale leading edges and occur in straight rows across the back, unlike all other North American turtles, including the other three subspecies of painted turtle, which have alternating segments. The bottom shell is plain yellow or lightly spotted. Sometimes as few as one dark grey spot near the lower center of the shell.
- The midland painted turtle (C. p. marginata) is 10–25 cm (4–10 in) long. The centrally located midland is the hardest to distinguish from the other three subspecies. Its bottom shell has a characteristic symmetrical dark shadow in the center which varies in size and prominence.
- The largest subspecies is the western painted turtle (C. p. bellii), which grows up to 26.6 cm (10 in) long. Its top shell has a mesh-like pattern of light lines, and the top stripe present in other subspecies is missing or faint. Its bottom shell has a large colored splotch that spreads to the edges (further than the midland) and often has red hues.

Eastern painted turtle C. p. picta	Midland painted turtle C. p. marginata	Western painted turtle C. p. bellii
Full overhead shot of an eastern painted turtle	Midland painted turtle standing on tarmac, with neck extended	Western painted turtle standing in grass, with neck extended
Handled turtle, exposing the orange-yellow undershell (plastron)	An overturned turtle on rocks: the under shell is faint tan with faint black shaded patterns on it.	An overturned turtle on grass: coloring is bright red with black and white Rorshach-like patterns.

Until the 1930s, many of the subspecies of the painted turtle were labeled by biologists as full species within Chrysemys, but this varied by the researcher. The painted turtles in the border region between the western and midland subspecies were sometimes considered a full species, treleasei. In 1931, Bishop and Schmidt defined the current "four in one" taxonomy of species and subspecies. Based on comparative measurements of turtles from throughout the range, they subordinated species to subspecies and eliminated treleasei.

Since at least 1958, (Note: Bishop and Schmidt alluded to glacial origins even earlier.) the subspecies were thought to have evolved in response to geographic isolation during the last ice age, 100,000 to 11,000 years ago. At that time painted turtles were divided into three different populations: eastern painted turtles along the southeastern Atlantic coast; southern painted turtles around the southern Mississippi River; and western painted turtles in the southwestern United States. The populations were not completely isolated for sufficiently long, hence wholly different species never evolved. When the glaciers retreated, about 11,000 years ago, all three subspecies moved north. One theory about the origin of the subspecies is that the western and southern subspecies met in Missouri and hybridized to produce the midland painted turtle, which then moved east and north through the Ohio and Tennessee river basins. However, morphological evidence does not support this theory. Instead, it was found that if the midland turtle is a hybrid, it would more likely be a hybrid of the eastern and western subspecies.

In 2003, Starkey et al. proposed that Chrysemys dorsalis, formerly considered a subspecies of C. picta, to be a distinct species sister to all subspecies in C. picta. Although this proposal was largely unrecognized at the time due to evidence of hybridization between dorsalis and picta, the Turtle Taxonomy Working Group and the Reptile Database have since followed through with it, although both the subspecific and specific names have been recognized.

=== Fossils ===
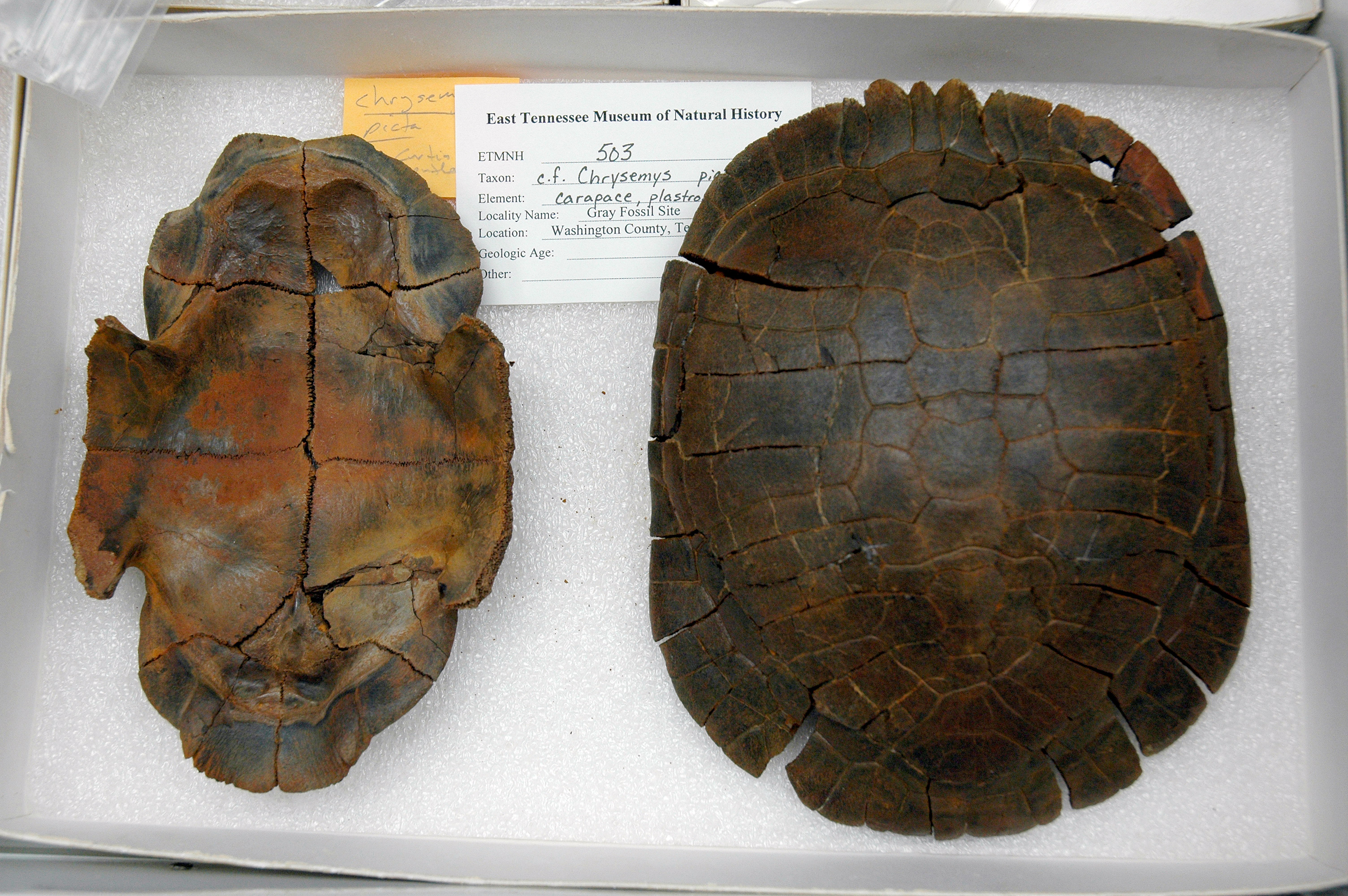
Top and bottom shell fossils, about 5 million years old, from a Tennessee sinkhole

Although its evolutionary history—what the forerunner to the species was and how the close relatives branched off—is not well understood, the painted turtle is common in the fossil record. The oldest samples, found in Nebraska, date to about 15 million years ago. Fossils from 15 million to about 5 million years ago are restricted to the Nebraska-Kansas area, but more recent fossils are gradually more widely distributed. Fossils newer than 300,000 years old are found in almost all the United States and southern Canada.

=== DNA ===
The turtle's karyotype (nuclear DNA, rather than mitochondrial DNA) consists of 50 chromosomes, the same number as the rest of its subfamily-mates and the most common number for Emydidae turtles in general. Less well-related turtles have from 26 to 66 chromosomes. Little systematic study of variations of the painted turtle's karyotype among populations has been done. (However, in 1967, research on protein structure of offshore island populations in New England, showed differences from mainland turtles.)

Comparison of subspecies chromosomal DNA has been discussed, to help address the debate over Starkey's proposed taxonomy, but as of 2009 had not been reported. The complete sequencing of the genetic code for the painted turtle was at a "draft assembled" state in 2010. The turtle was one of two reptiles chosen to be first sequenced.

== Description ==
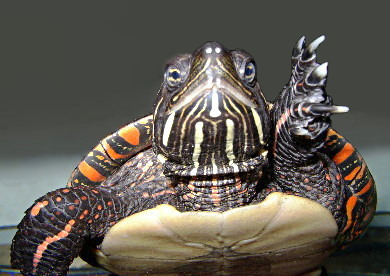
Painted turtle's yellow face-stripes, philtrum (nasal groove), and foot webbing

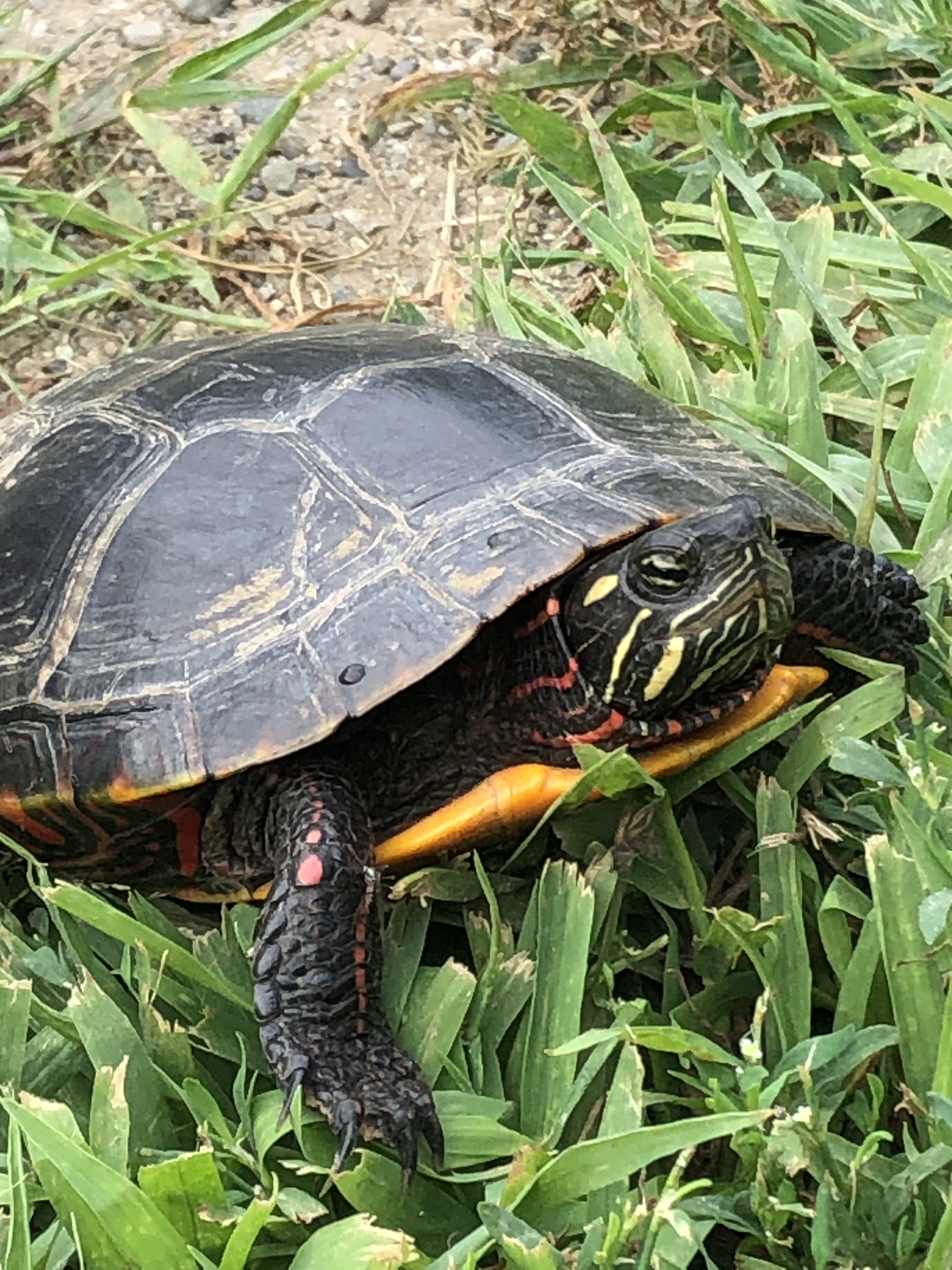
Eastern Painted Turtle (Chrysemys picta picta)

Adult painted turtles can grow to 13–25 cm (5–10 in) long, with males being smaller. The shell is oval, smooth with little grooves where the large scale-like plates overlap, and flat-bottomed. (Note: All turtle lengths in this article refer to the top shell (carapace) length, not the extended head to tail length.) The color of the top shell (carapace) varies from olive to black. Darker specimens are more common where the bottom of the water body is darker. The bottom shell (plastron) is yellow, sometimes red, sometimes with dark markings in the center. Similar to the top shell, the turtle's skin is olive to black, but with red and yellow stripes on its neck, legs, and tail. As with other pond turtles, such as the bog turtle, the painted turtle's feet are webbed to aid swimming.

The head of the turtle is distinctive. The face has only yellow stripes, with a large yellow spot and streak behind each eye, and on the chin two wide yellow stripes that meet at the tip of the jaw. The turtle's upper jaw is shaped into an inverted "V" (philtrum), with a downward-facing, tooth-like projection on each side.

The hatchling has a proportionally larger head, eyes, and tail, and a more circular shell than the adult. The adult female is generally longer than the male, 10–25 cm (4–10 in) versus 7–15 cm (3–6 in). For a given length, the female has a higher (more rounded, less flat) top shell. The female weighs around 500 g (18 oz) on average, against the males' average adult weight of roughly 300 g (11 oz). The female's greater body volume supports her egg-production. The male has longer foreclaws and a longer, thicker tail, with the anus (cloaca) located further out on the tail.

=== Similar species ===
The painted turtle has a very similar appearance to the red-eared slider (the most common pet turtle) and the two are often confused. The painted turtle can be distinguished because it is flatter than the slider. Also, the slider has a prominent red marking on the side of its head (the "ear") and a spotted bottom shell, both features missing in the painted turtle.

Painted turtle	Red-eared slider

== Distribution ==
=== Range ===
The most widespread North American turtle, the painted turtle is the only turtle whose native range extends from the Atlantic to the Pacific. (Note: The range description and map primarily rely on Conant and Collins (1998) and Ernst and Lovich have a similar range map. Additional citations and notes cover details of range boundaries especially in the West.) It is native to eight of Canada's ten provinces, forty-five of the fifty United States, and one of Mexico's thirty-one states. On the East Coast, it lives from the Canadian Maritimes to the U.S. state of Georgia. On the West Coast, it lives in British Columbia, Washington, and Oregon and offshore on southeast Vancouver Island. (Note: Vancouver Island painted turtle populations may have resulted from escaped pets.) The northernmost American turtle, its range includes much of southern Canada. To the south, its range reaches the U.S. Gulf Coast in Louisiana and Alabama. In the southwestern United States there are only dispersed populations. It is found in one river in extreme northern Mexico. It is absent in a part of southwestern Virginia and the adjacent states as well as in north-central Alabama. There is a harsher divide between midland and eastern painted turtles in the southeast because they are separated by the Appalachian mountains, but the two subspecies tend to mix in the northeast.

Native range of the painted turtle (C. picta); Dark grey for national borders White for state and province borders Dark blue for rivers, only showing those in article / Eastern (C. p. picta) Midland (C. p. marginata) Southern (C. dorsalis) Western (C. p. bellii) / Intergrade mixtures (large areas only) Mix of eastern and midland Mix of eastern and southern Mix of midland and western

The borders between the four subspecies are not sharp, because the subspecies interbreed. Many studies have been performed in the border regions to assess the intermediate turtles, usually by comparing the anatomical features of hybrids that result from intergradation of the classical subspecies. (Note: See the following sources.) Despite the imprecision, the subspecies are assigned nominal ranges.

==== Eastern painted turtle ====
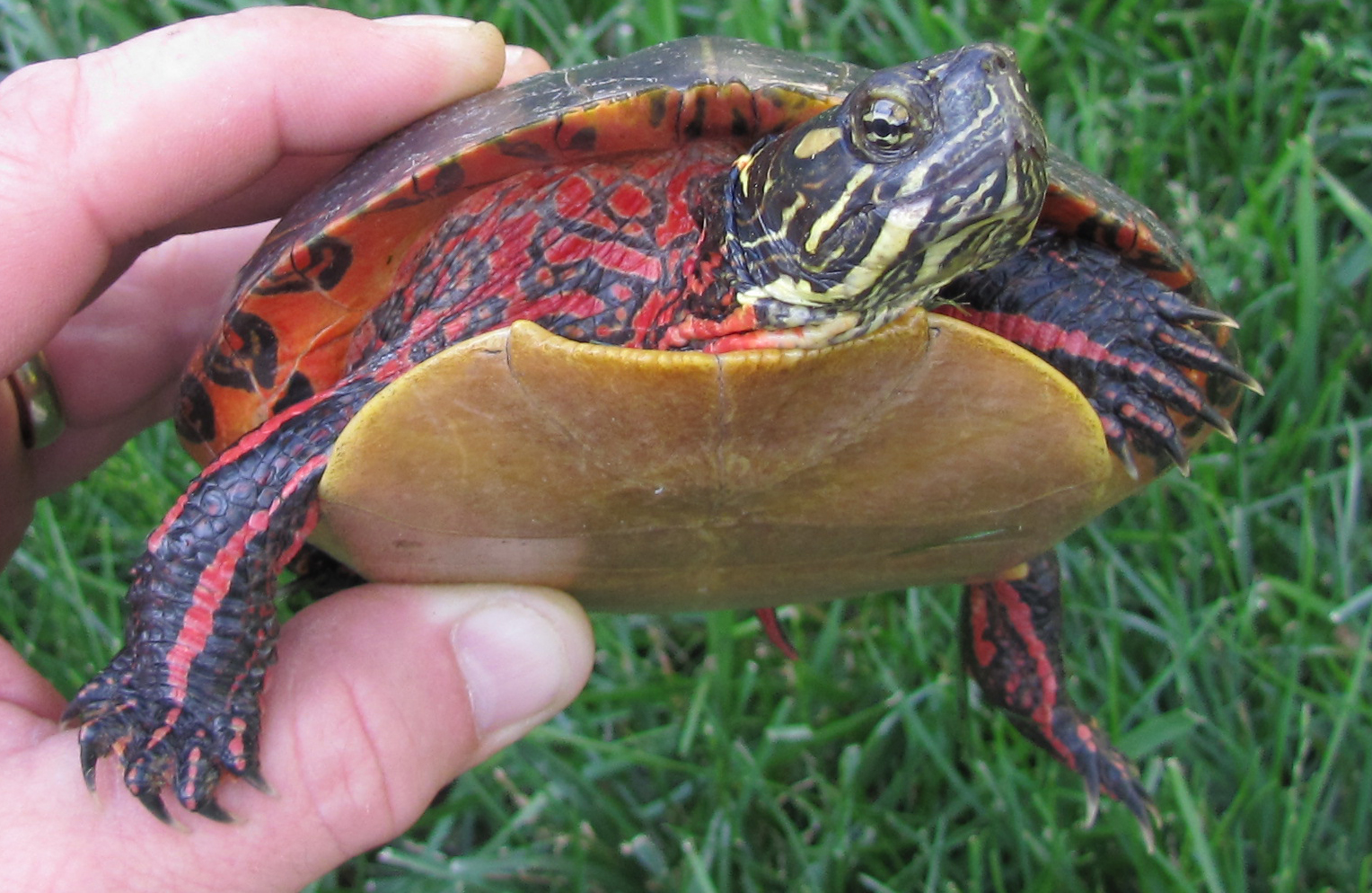
Eastern painted turtle in Massachusetts

The eastern painted turtle ranges from southeastern Canada to Georgia with a western boundary at approximately the Appalachians. At its northern extremes, the turtle tends to be restricted to the warmer areas closer to the Atlantic Ocean. It is uncommon in far north New Hampshire and in Maine is common only in a strip about 50 miles from the coast. In Canada, it lives in New Brunswick and Nova Scotia but not in Quebec or Prince Edward Island. To the south it is not found in the coastal lowlands of southern North Carolina, South Carolina, or Georgia, or in southern Georgia in general or at all in Florida.

In the northeast, there is extensive mixing with the midland subspecies, and some writers have called these turtles a "hybrid swarm". In the southeast, the border between the eastern and midland is more sharp as mountain chains separate the subspecies to different drainage basins.

==== Midland painted turtle ====
The midland painted turtle lives from southern Ontario and Quebec, through the eastern U.S. Midwest states, to Kentucky, Tennessee and northwestern Alabama, where it intergrades with the southern painted turtle. It also is found eastward through West Virginia, western Maryland and Pennsylvania. The midland painted turtle appears to be moving east, especially in Pennsylvania. To the northeast it is found in western New York and much of Vermont, and it intergrades extensively with the eastern subspecies.

==== Western painted turtle ====
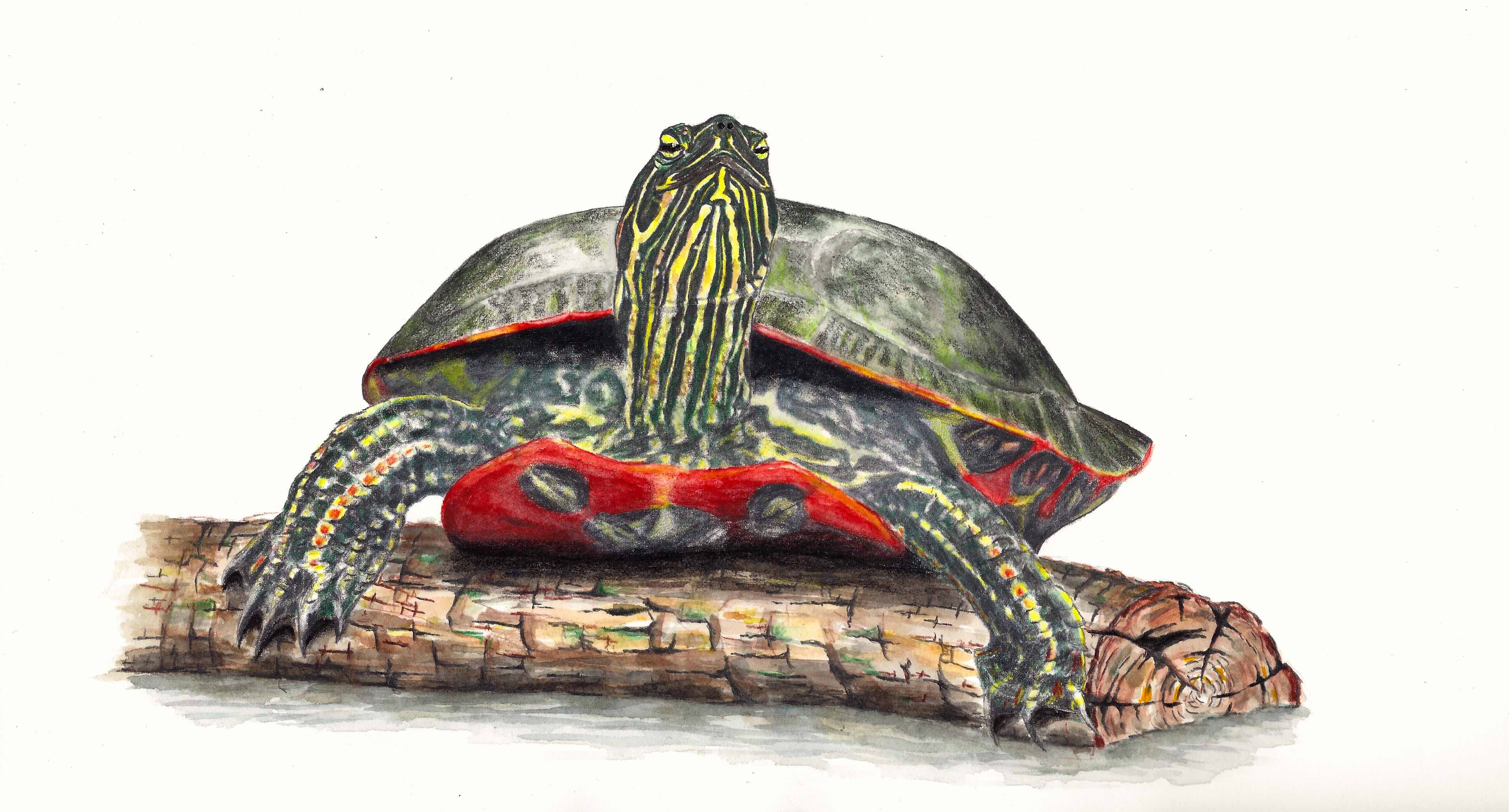
Western painted turtle (watercolor by Gordon)

The western painted turtle's northern range includes southern parts of western Canada from Ontario through Manitoba, Saskatchewan, Alberta and British Columbia. This subspecies is one of only two native turtle species in this area. In Ontario, the western subspecies is found north of Minnesota and directly north of Lake Superior, but there is a 130 km (80 mi) gap to the east of Lake Superior (in the area of harshest winter climate) where no painted turtles of any subspecies occur. Thus Ontario's western subspecies does not intergrade with the midland painted turtle of southeastern Ontario. In Manitoba, the turtle is numerous and ranges north to Lake Manitoba and the lower part of Lake Winnipeg. The turtle is also common in south Saskatchewan, but in Alberta, there may only be 100 individuals, all found very near the U.S. border, mostly in the southeast.

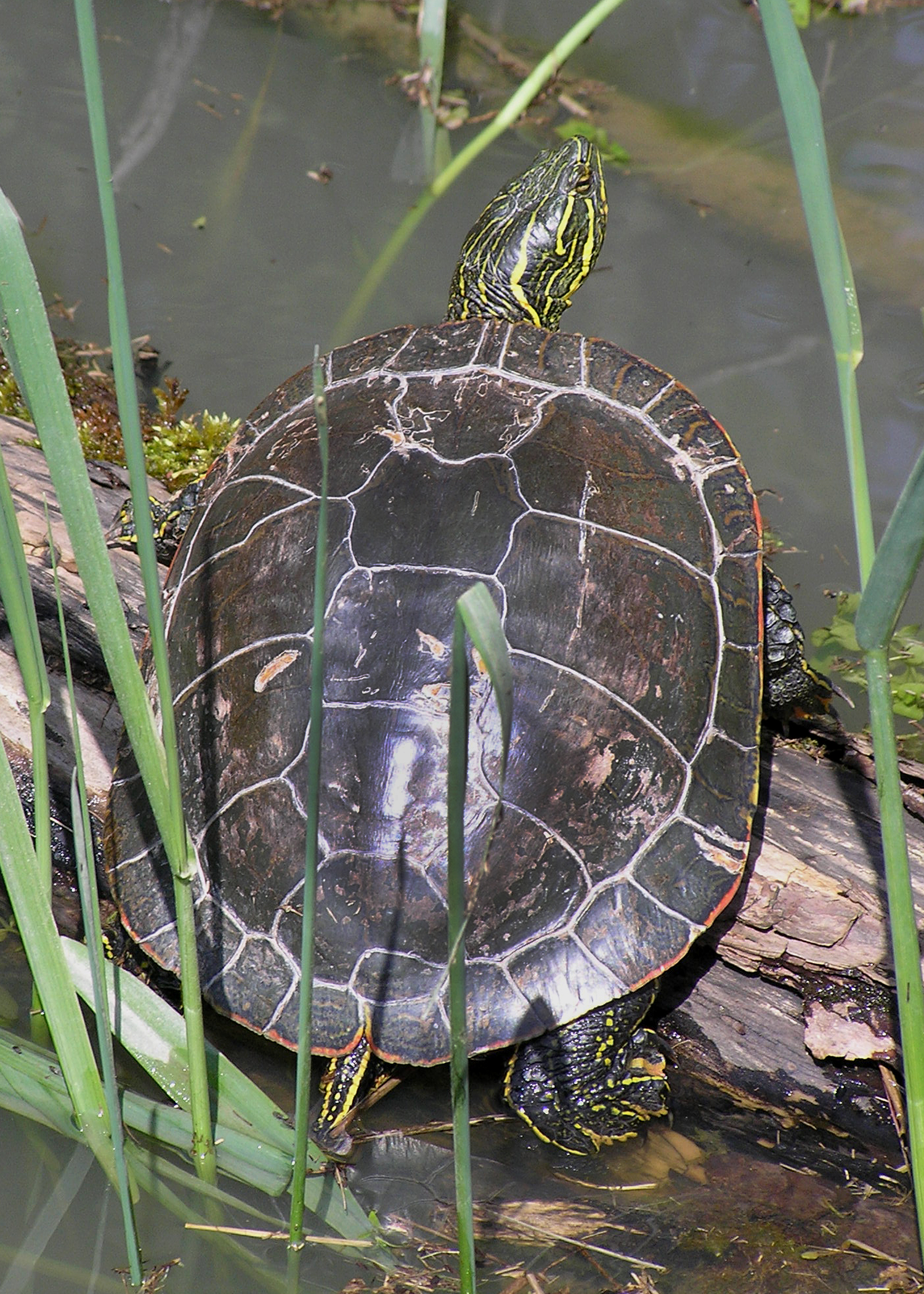
Western painted turtle in Oregon

In British Columbia, populations exist in the interior in the vicinity of the Kootenai, Columbia, Okanagan, and Thompson river valleys. At the coast, turtles occur near the mouth of the Fraser and a bit further north, as well as the bottom of Vancouver Island, and some other nearby islands. Within British Columbia, the turtle's range is not continuous and can better be understood as northward extensions of the range from the United States. High mountains present barriers to east–west movement of the turtles within the province or from Alberta. Some literature has shown isolated populations much further north in British Columbia and Alberta, but these were probably pet-releases.

In the United States, the western subspecies forms a wide intergrade area with the midland subspecies covering much of Illinois as well as a strip of Wisconsin along Lake Michigan and part of the Upper Peninsula of Michigan (UP). Further west, the rest of Illinois, Wisconsin and the UP are part of the range proper, as are all of Minnesota and Iowa, as well as all of Missouri except a narrow strip in the south. All of North Dakota is within range, all of South Dakota except a very small area in the west, and all of Nebraska. Almost all of Kansas is in range; the border of that state with Oklahoma is roughly the species range border, but the turtle is found in three counties of north central Oklahoma.

To the northwest, almost all of Montana is in range. Only a narrow strip in the west, along most of the Idaho border (which is at the Continental Divide) lacks turtles. Wyoming is almost entirely out of range; only the lower elevation areas near the eastern and northern borders have painted turtles. In Idaho, the turtles are found throughout the far north (upper half of the Idaho Panhandle). Recently, separate Idaho populations have been observed in the southwest (near the Payette and Boise rivers) and the southeast (near St. Anthony). In Washington state, turtles are common throughout the state within lower elevation river valleys. In Oregon, the turtle is native to the northern part of the state throughout the Columbia River Valley as well as the Willamette River Valley north of Salem.

To the southwest, the painted turtle's range is fragmented. In Colorado, while range is continuous in the eastern, prairie, half of the state, it is absent in most of the western, mountainous, part of the state. However, the turtle is confirmed present in the lower elevation southwest part of the state (Archuleta and La Plata counties), where a population ranges into northern New Mexico in the San Juan River basin. In New Mexico, the main distribution follows the Rio Grande and the Pecos River, two waterways that run in a north–south direction through the state. Within the aforementioned rivers, it is also found in the northern part of Far West Texas. In Utah, the painted turtle lives in an area to the south (Kane County) in streams draining into the Colorado River, although it is disputed if they are native. In Arizona, the painted turtle is native to an area in the east, Lyman Lake. The painted turtle is not native to Nevada or California.

In Mexico, painted turtles have been found about 50 miles south of New Mexico near Galeana in the state of Chihuahua. There, two expeditions found the turtles in the Rio Santa Maria which is in a closed basin.

==== Human-introduced range ====
Pet releases are starting to establish the painted turtle outside its native range. It has been introduced into waterways near Phoenix, Arizona, and to Germany, Indonesia, the Philippines, and Spain.

=== Habitat ===
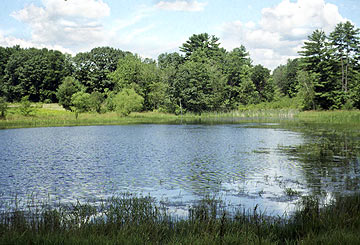
Painted turtle habitat in New Hampshire

To thrive, painted turtles need fresh waters with soft bottoms, basking sites, and aquatic vegetation. They find their homes in shallow waters with slow-moving currents, such as creeks, marshes, ponds, and the shores of lakes. The subspecies have evolved different habitat preferences.

- The eastern painted turtle is very aquatic, leaving the immediate vicinity of its water body only when forced by drought to migrate. Along the Atlantic, painted turtles have appeared in brackish waters. They can be found in wetland areas like swamps and marshes with a thick layer of mud as well as sandy bottoms with lots of vegetation. Areas with warmer climates have higher relative densities among populations and habitat desirability also influences density.
- The midland and southern painted turtles seek especially quiet waters, usually shores and coves. They favor shallows that contain dense vegetation and have an unusual toleration of pollution.
- The western painted turtle lives in streams and lakes, similar to the other painted turtles, but also inhabits pasture ponds and roadside pools. It is found as high as 1,800 m (5,900 ft).

=== Population features ===
Shell marking code

Within much of its range, the painted turtle is the most abundant turtle species. Population densities range from 10 to 840 turtles per hectare (2.5 acres) of water surface. Warmer climates produce higher relative densities among populations, and habitat desirability also influences density. Rivers and large lakes have lower densities because only the shore is desirable habitat; the central, deep waters skew the surface-based estimates. Also, lake and river turtles have to make longer linear trips to access equivalent amounts of foraging space.

Adults outnumber juveniles in most populations, but gauging the ratios is difficult because juveniles are harder to find. With current sampling methods, estimates of age distribution vary widely. Annual survival rate of painted turtles increases with age. The probability of a painted turtle surviving from the egg to its first birthday is only 19%. For females, the annual survival rate rises to 45% for juveniles and 95% for adults. The male survival rates follow a similar pattern, but are probably lower overall than females, as evidenced by the average male age being lower than that of the female. Natural disasters can confound age distributions. For instance, a hurricane can destroy many nests in a region, resulting in fewer hatchlings the next year. Age distributions may also be skewed by migrations of adults.

To understand painted turtle adult age distributions, researchers require reliable methods. The age of very young turtles can be estimated based on "growth rings" in their shells, but this method is not exact. For older turtles, some attempts have been made to determine age based on size and shape of their shells or legs using mathematical models, but this method is more uncertain. The most reliable method to study the long-lived turtles is to capture them, permanently mark their shells by notching with a drill, release the turtles, and then recapture them in later years. The longest-running study, in Michigan, has shown that painted turtles can live more than 55 years.

Adult sex ratios of painted turtle populations average around 1:1. Many populations are slightly male-heavy, but some are strongly female-imbalanced; one population in Ontario has a female to male ratio of 4:1. Hatchling sex ratio varies based on egg temperature. During the middle third of incubation, temperatures of 23–27 °C (73–81 °F) produce males, and anything above or below that, females. It does not appear that females choose nesting sites to influence the sex of the hatchlings; within a population, nests will vary sufficiently to give both male and female-heavy broods.

== Ecology ==
=== Diet ===
The painted turtle is a bottom-dwelling hunter. It quickly juts its head into and out of vegetation to stir potential victims out into the open water, where they are pursued. Large prey is ripped apart with the forefeet as the turtle holds it in its mouth. It also consumes plants and skims the surface of the water with its mouth open to catch small particles of food.

Although all subspecies of painted turtle eat both plants and animals (in the form of leaves, algae, fish, crustaceans, aquatic insects and carrion), their specific diets vary. Young painted turtles are mostly carnivorous and as they mature they become more herbivorous.

Painted turtles obtain coloration from carotenoids in their natural diet by eating algae and a variety of aquatic plants from their environment. Stripes and spots increase red and yellow chroma and decrease UV chroma and brightness in turtles with large amounts of carotenoids in their diet compared to the stripes and spots of turtles with only moderate amounts of carotenoids in their diet. In addition, painted turtles with increased carotenoid chromas have a corresponding increase in bactericidal capacity, resulting in a higher bacteria killing capacity.

- The eastern painted turtle's diet is the least studied. It prefers to eat in the water, but has been observed eating on land. The fish it consumes are typically dead or injured. However, they have also been observed to consume water insects and larvae, snails, algae, and vegetative plant matter. Furthermore, consuming the vegetative plant matter also makes them effective seed dispersers.
- The midland painted turtle eats mostly aquatic insects and both vascular and non-vascular plants.
- The western painted turtle's consumption of plants and animals changes seasonally. In early summer, 60% of its diet comprises insects. In late summer, 55% includes plants. Of note, the western painted turtle aids in the dispersal of white water-lily seeds. The turtle consumes the hard-coated seeds, which remain viable after passing through the turtle, and disperses them through its feces.

Common foods of the painted turtle

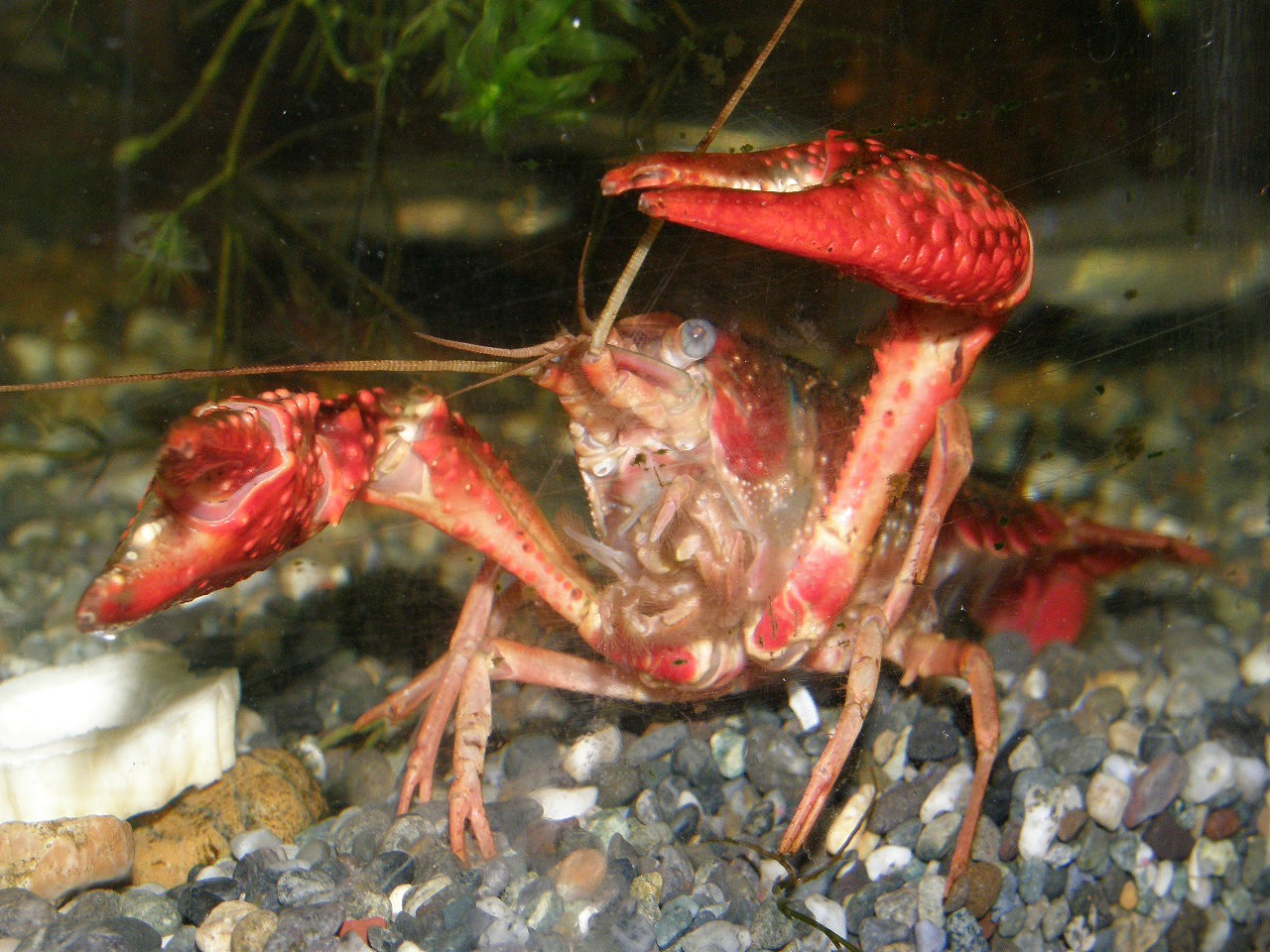
Crayfish

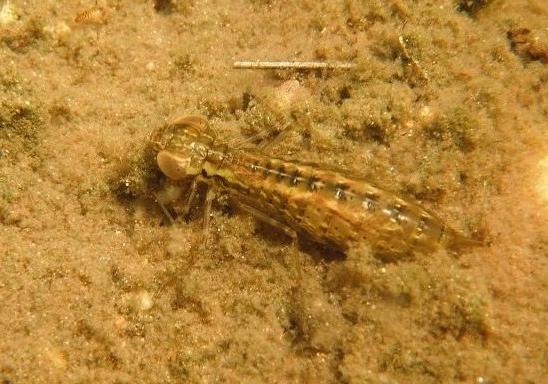
Dragonfly larva

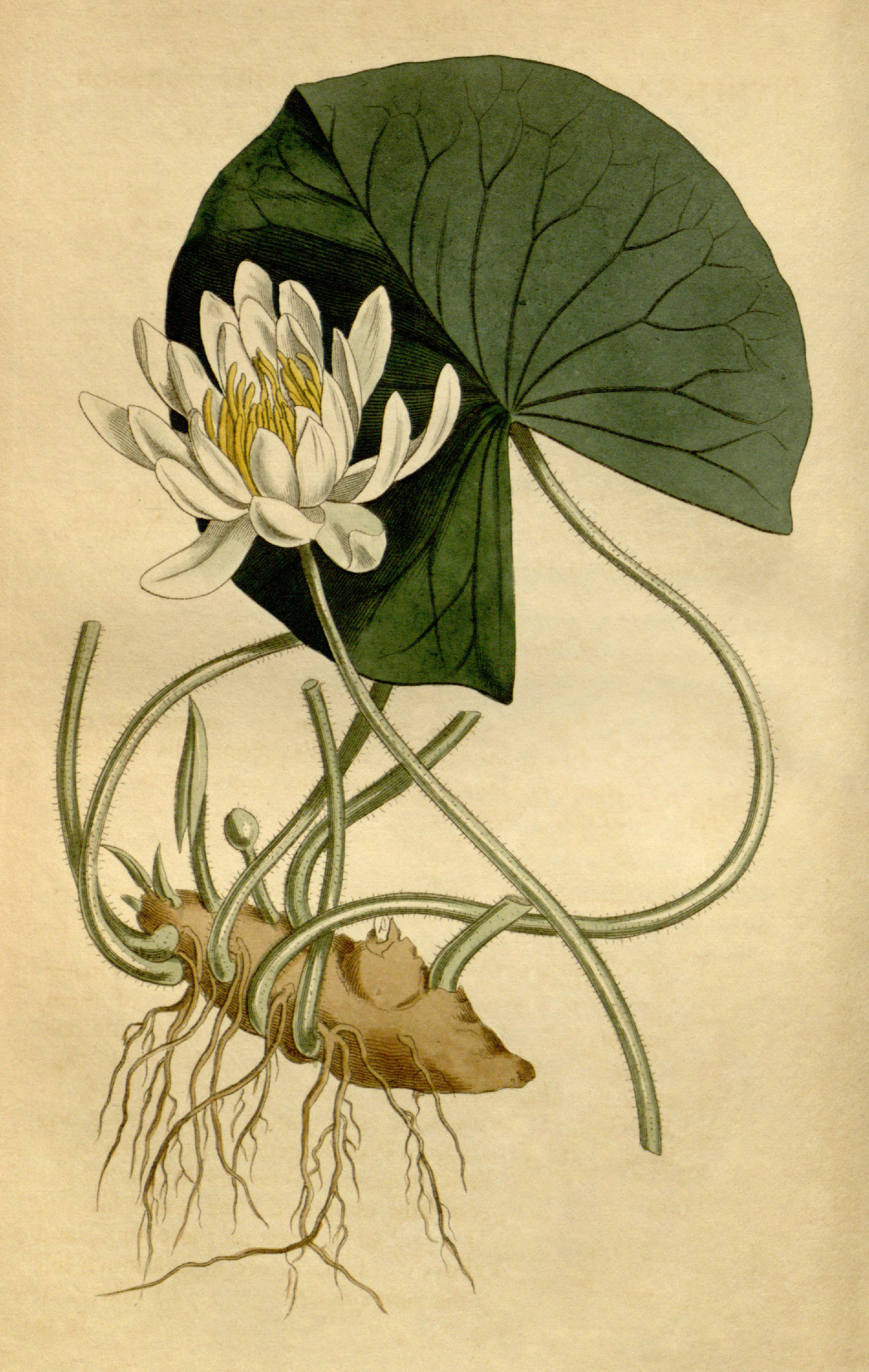
American water lily

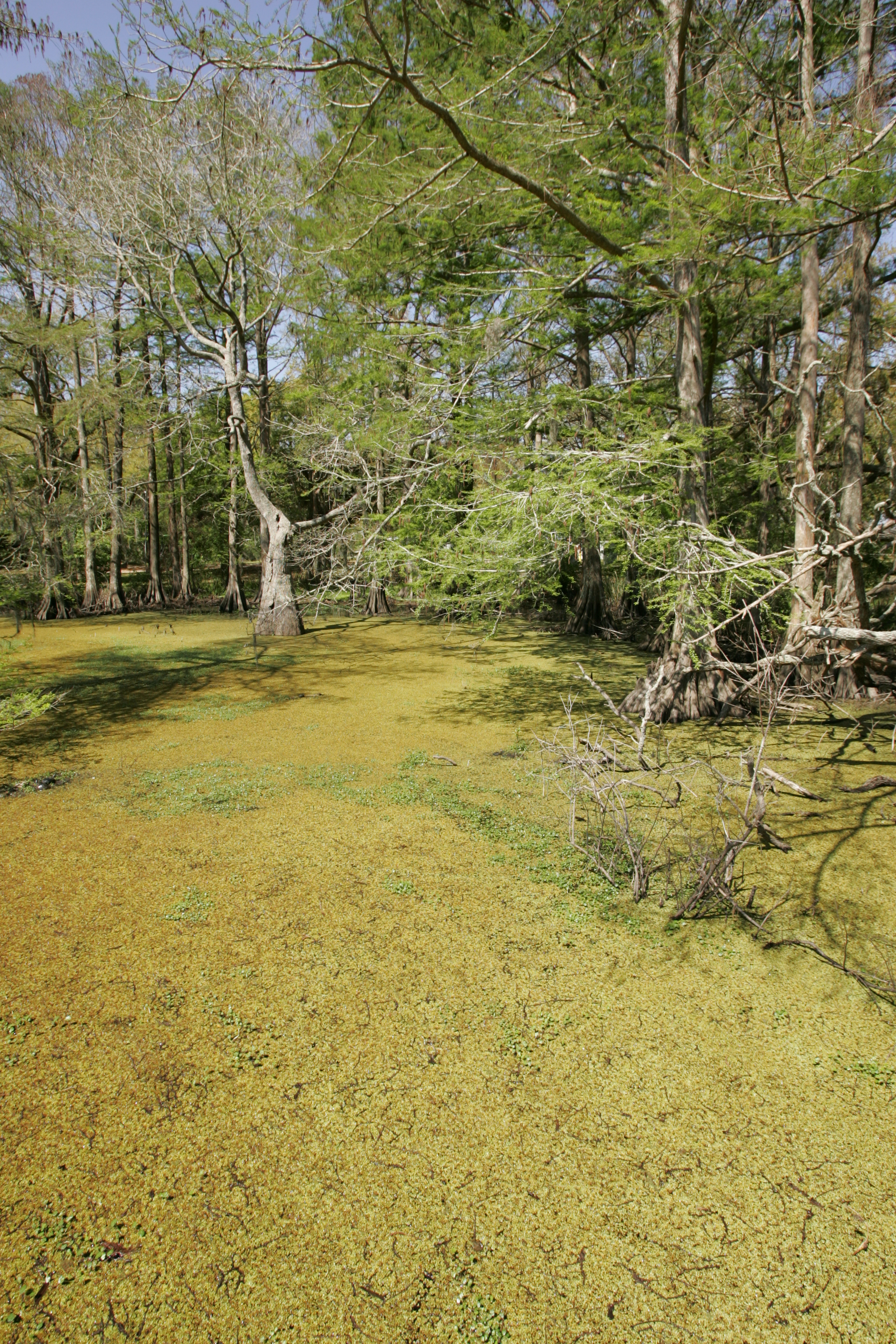
Duckweed (water surface)

=== Predators ===
Painted turtles are most vulnerable to predators when young. Nests are frequently ransacked and the eggs eaten by raccoons, plains garter snakes, crows, chipmunks, thirteen-lined ground and gray squirrels, skunks, groundhogs, badgers, gray and red fox, and humans. The small and sometimes bite-size, numerous hatchlings fall prey to water bugs, bass, catfish, bullfrogs, snapping turtles, herons, rice rats, muskrats, minks, snakes (Agkistrodon, Coluber and Nerodia), and raccoons. As adults, the turtles' armored shells protect them from many potential predators, but they still occasionally fall prey to alligators, ospreys, crows, red-shouldered hawks, bald eagles, otters, mink and especially raccoons.

Painted turtles defend themselves by kicking, scratching, biting, or urinating. In contrast to land tortoises, painted turtles can right themselves if they are flipped upside down.

Important predators of the painted turtle

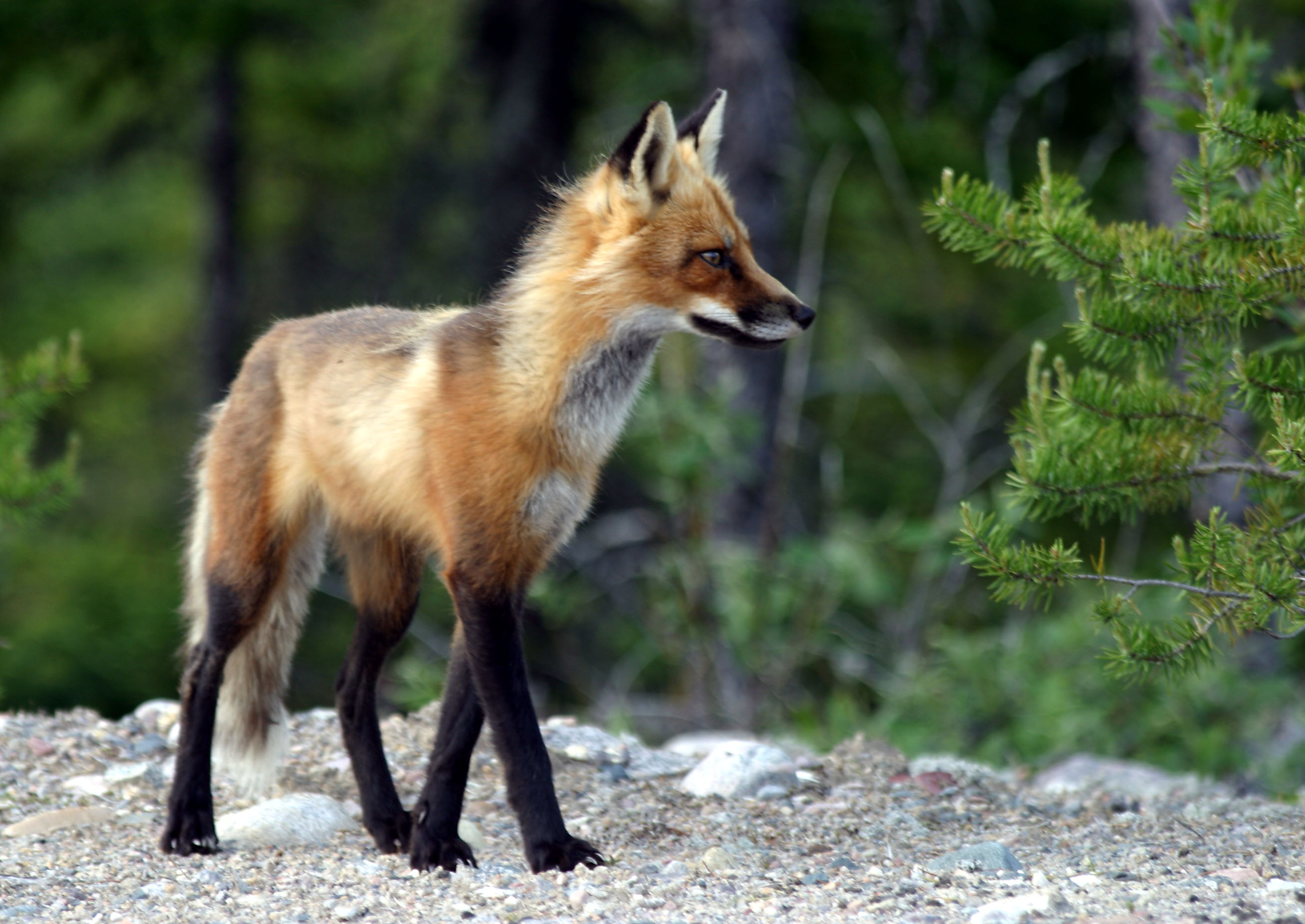
Of eggs: Red fox

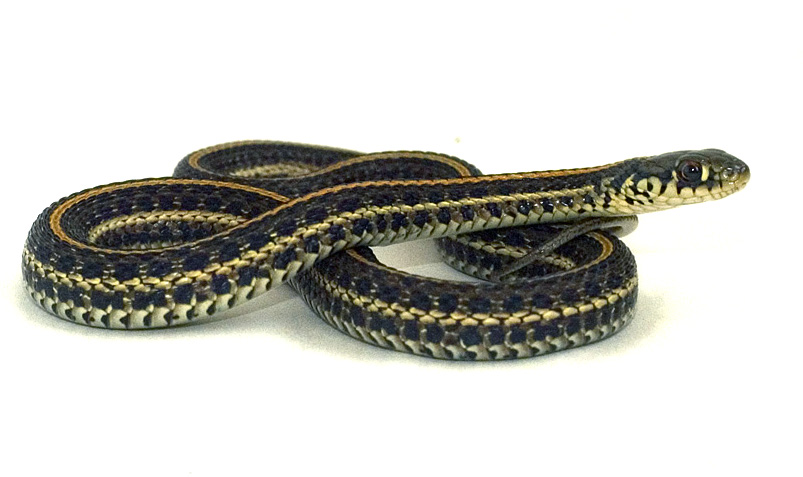
Plains garter snake

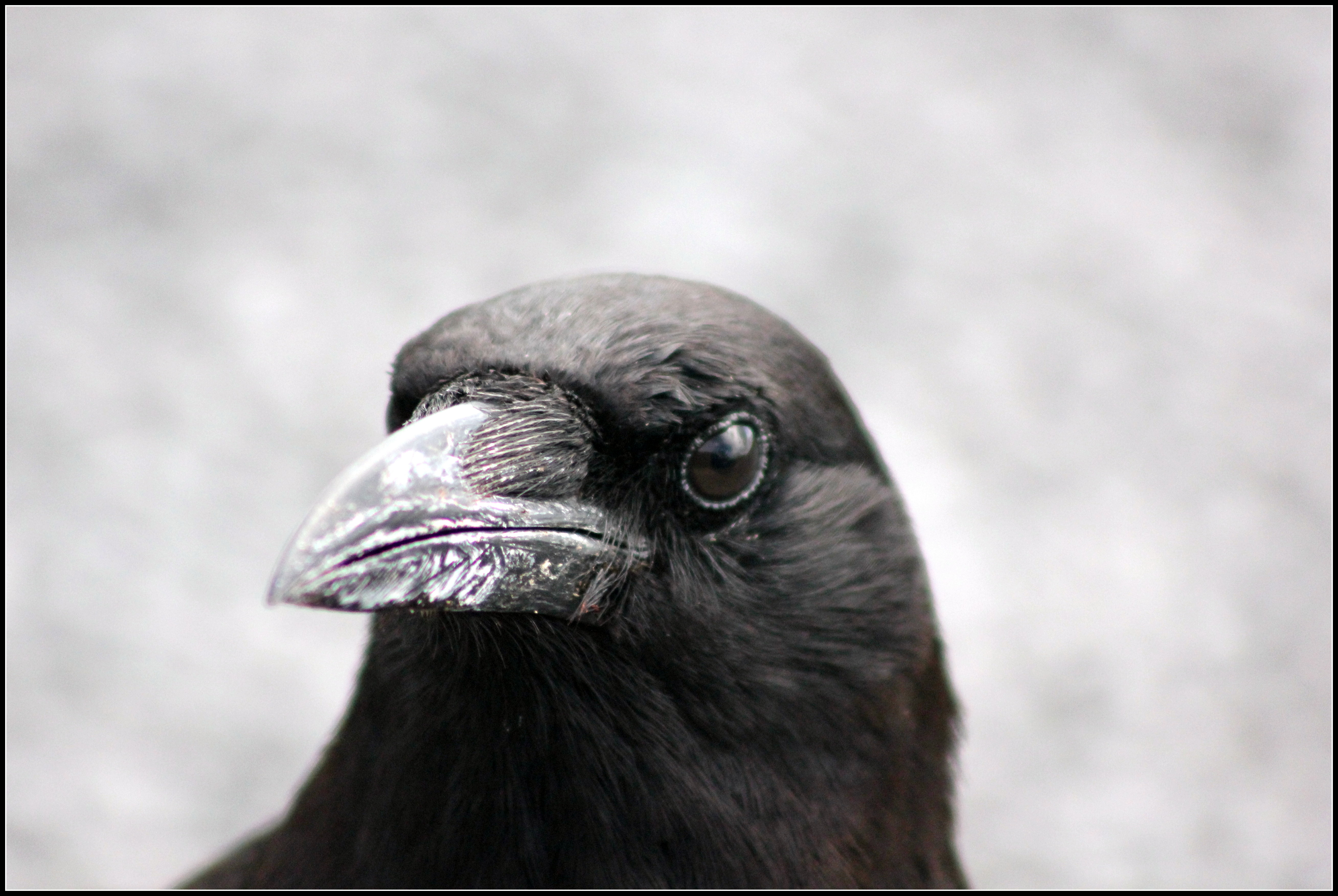
Crows

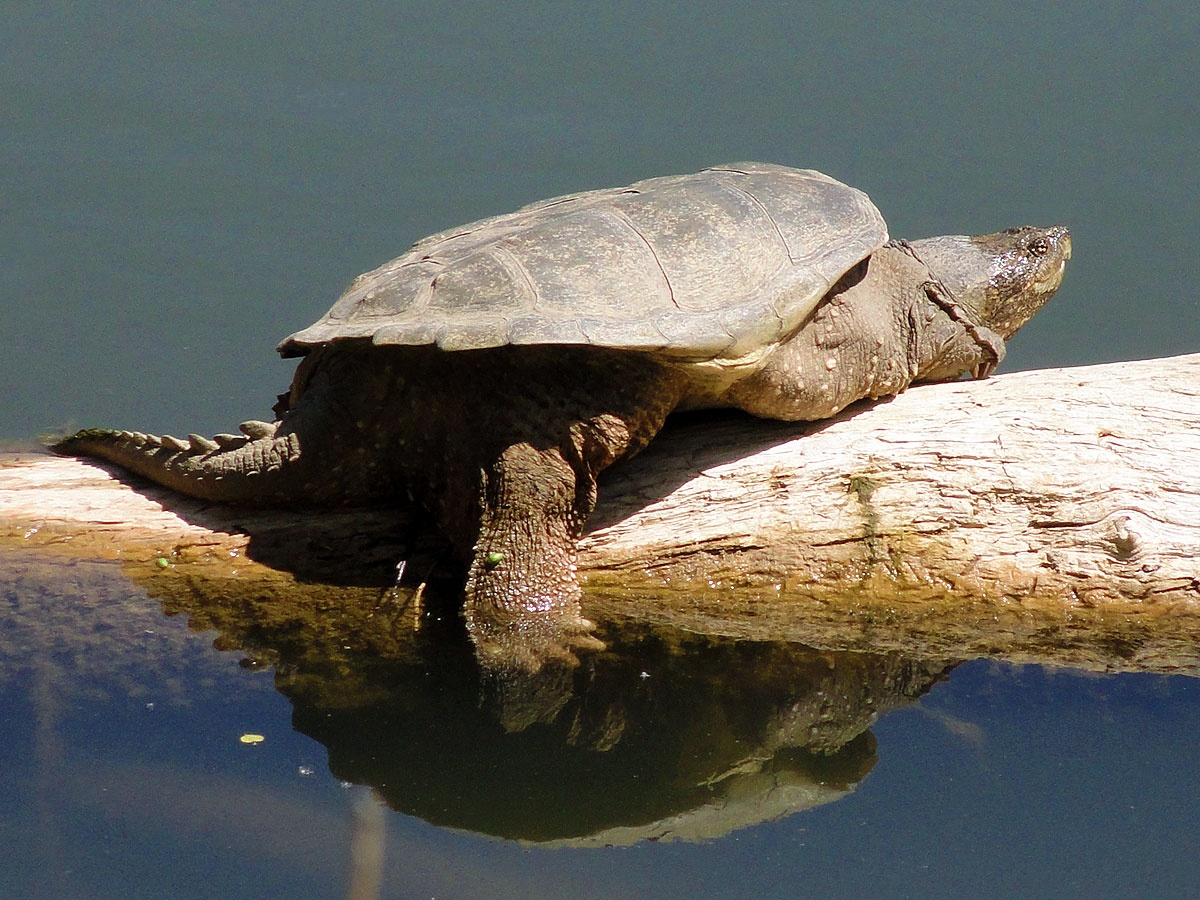
Of hatchlings: Common snapping turtle

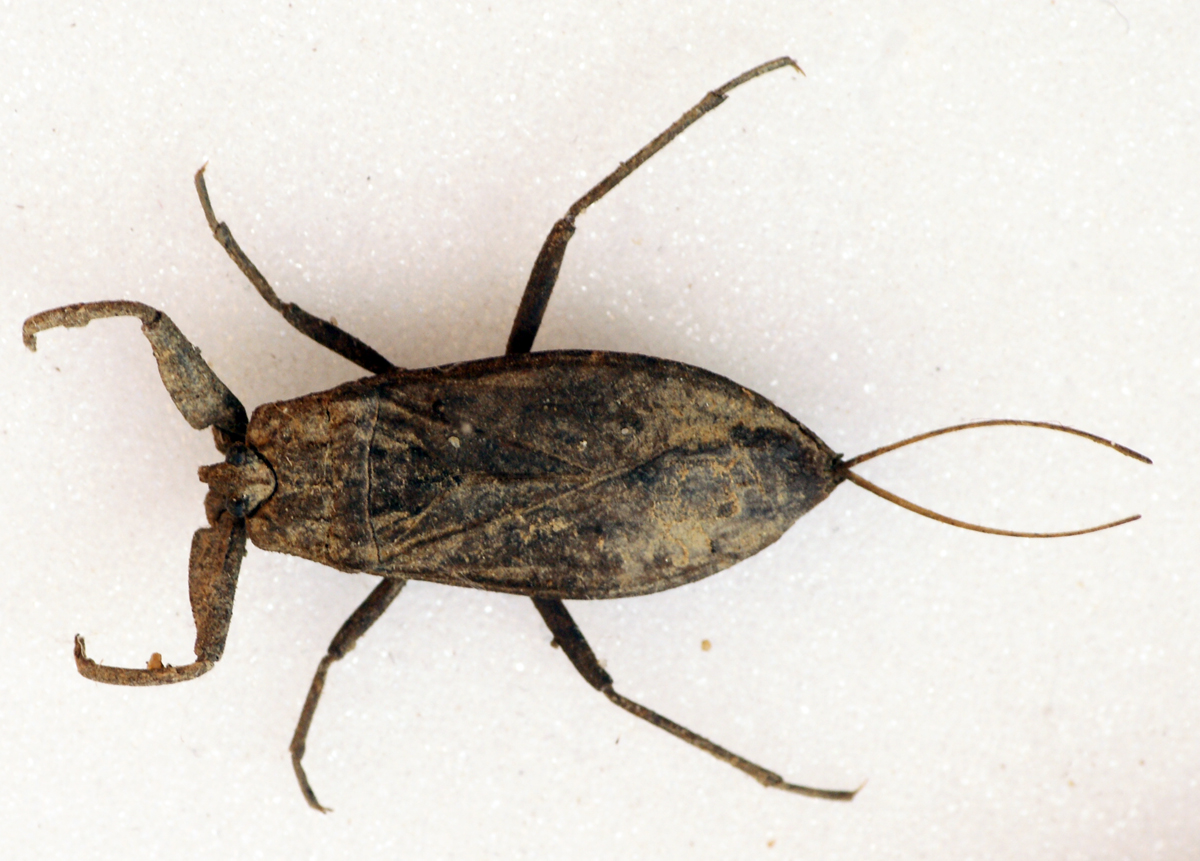
Water scorpion

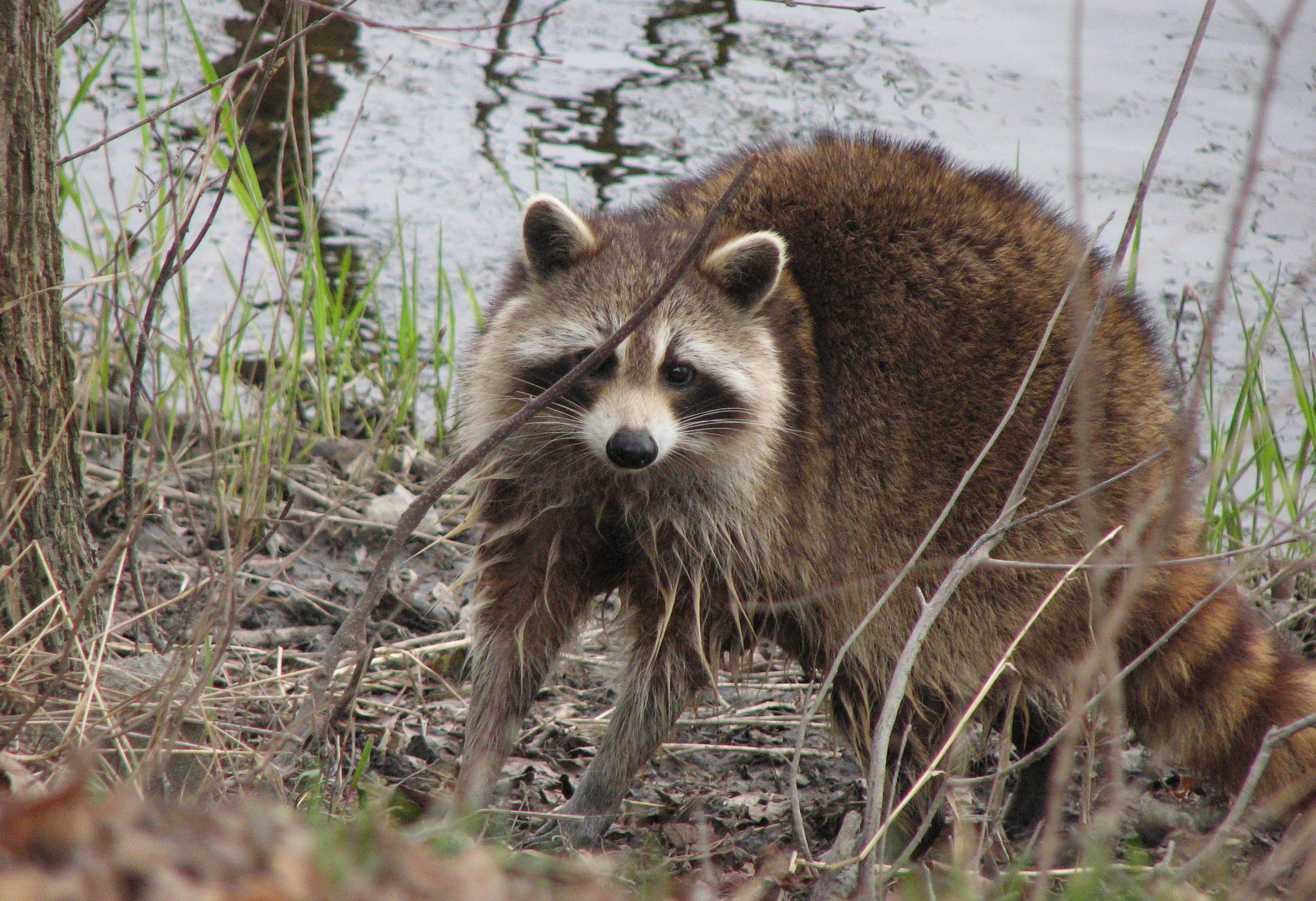
Of adults: Raccoon

== Life cycle ==
=== Mating ===
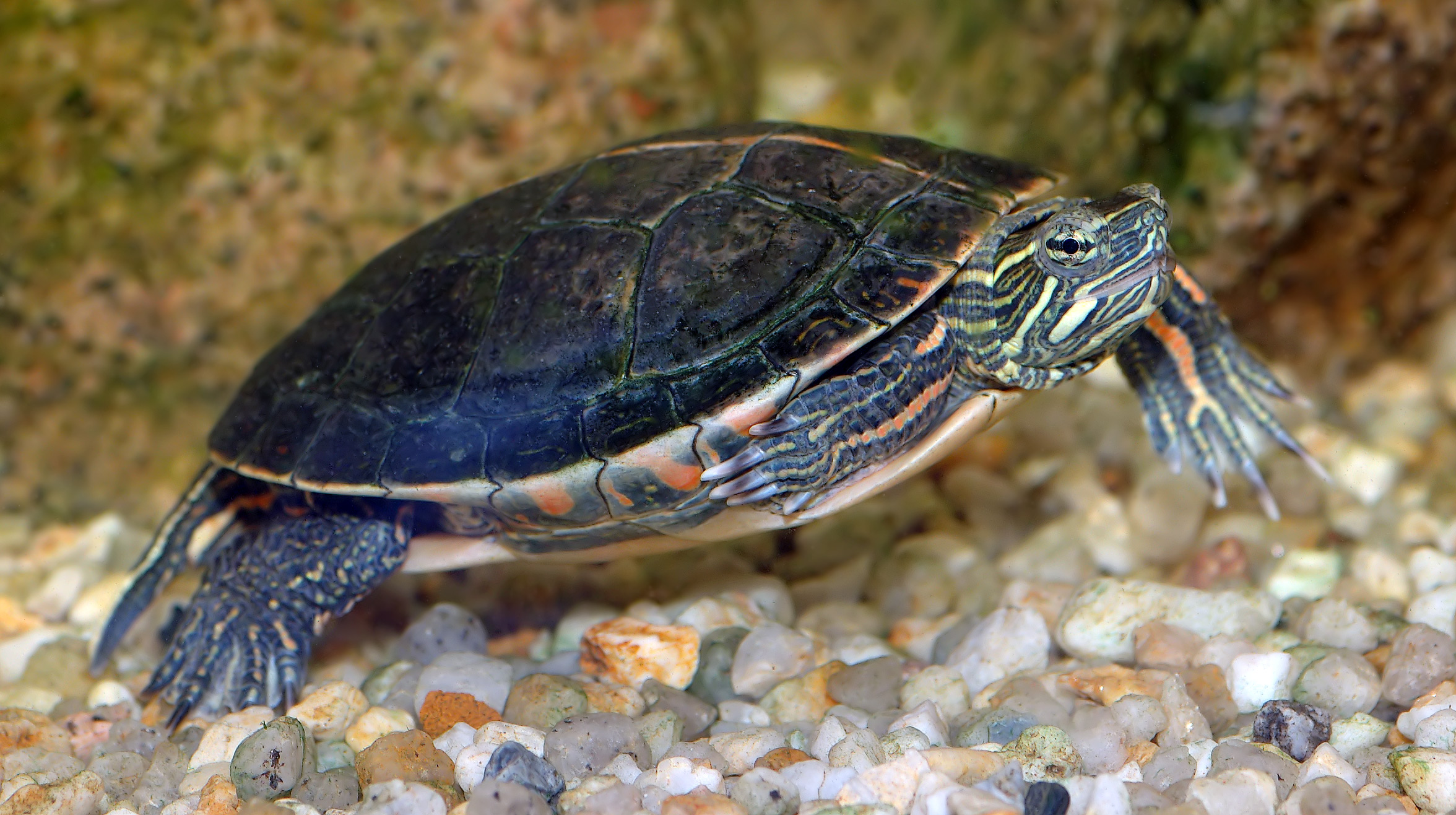
Male southern painted turtle shows his long front claws.

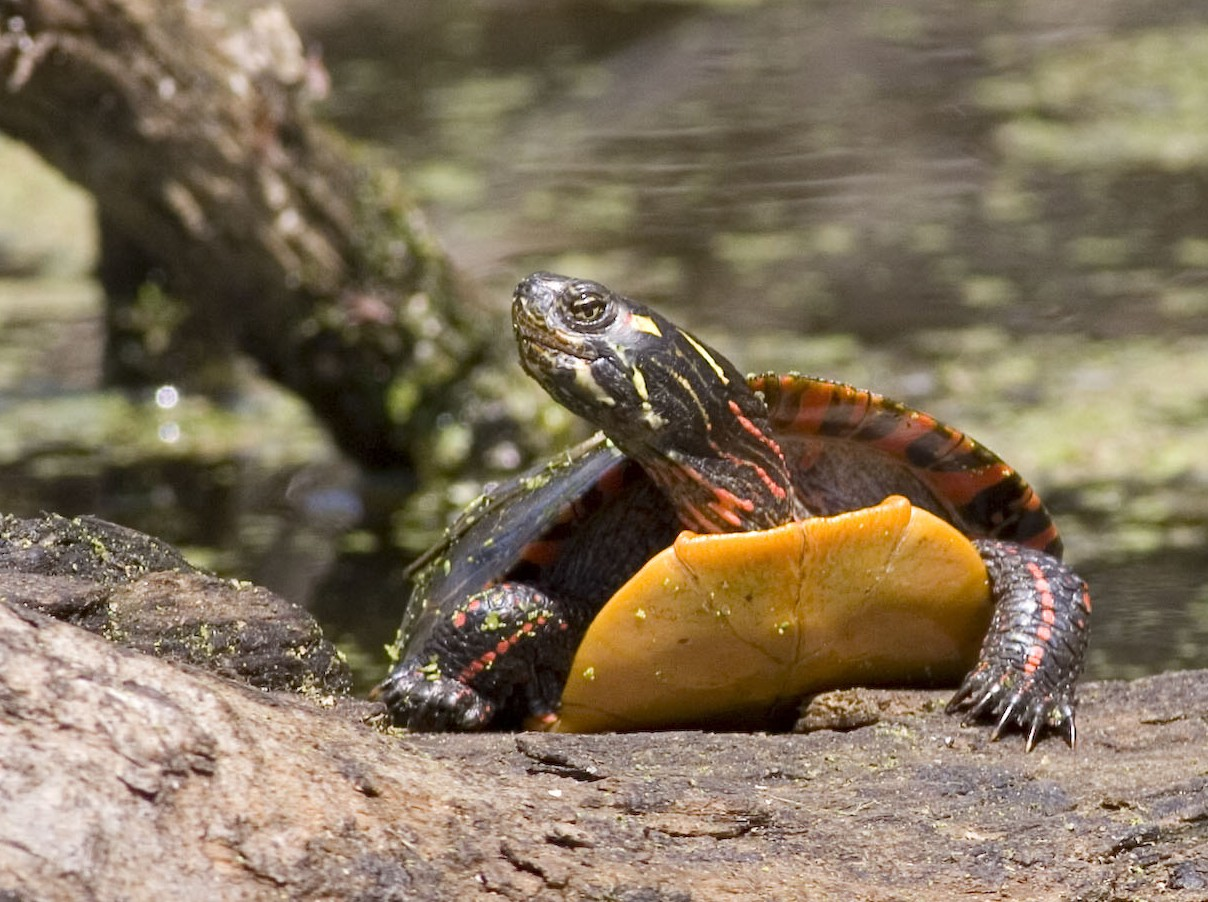
Female painted turtle

The painted turtles mate in spring and fall in waters of 10–25 °C (50–77 °F). Males start producing sperm in early spring, when they can bask to an internal temperature of 17 °C (63 °F). Females begin their reproductive cycles in mid-summer, and ovulate the following spring.

Courtship begins when a male follows a female until he meets her face-to-face. He then strokes her face and neck with his elongated front claws, a gesture returned by a receptive female. The pair repeat the process several times, with the male retreating from and then returning to the female until she swims to the bottom, where they copulate. As the male is smaller than the female, he is not dominant. Although not directly observed, evidence indicates that the male will inflict injury on the female in attempts of coercion. Males will use their tooth-like cusps on their beaks and their foreclaws during this act of coercion with the female. The female stores sperm, to be used for up to three clutches, in her oviducts; the sperm may remain viable for up to three years. A single clutch may have multiple fathers.

=== Egg-laying ===
Nesting is done, by the females only, between late May and mid-July. The nests are vase-shaped and are usually dug in sandy soil, often at sites with southern exposures. Nests are often within 200 m (220 yd) of water, but may be as far away as 600 m (660 yd), with older females tending to nest further inland. Nest sizes vary depending on female sizes and locations but are about 5–11 cm (2–4 in) deep. Females may return to the same sites several consecutive years, but if several females make their nests close together, the eggs become more vulnerable to predators. Female eastern painted turtles have been shown to nest together, possibly even participating in communal nesting.

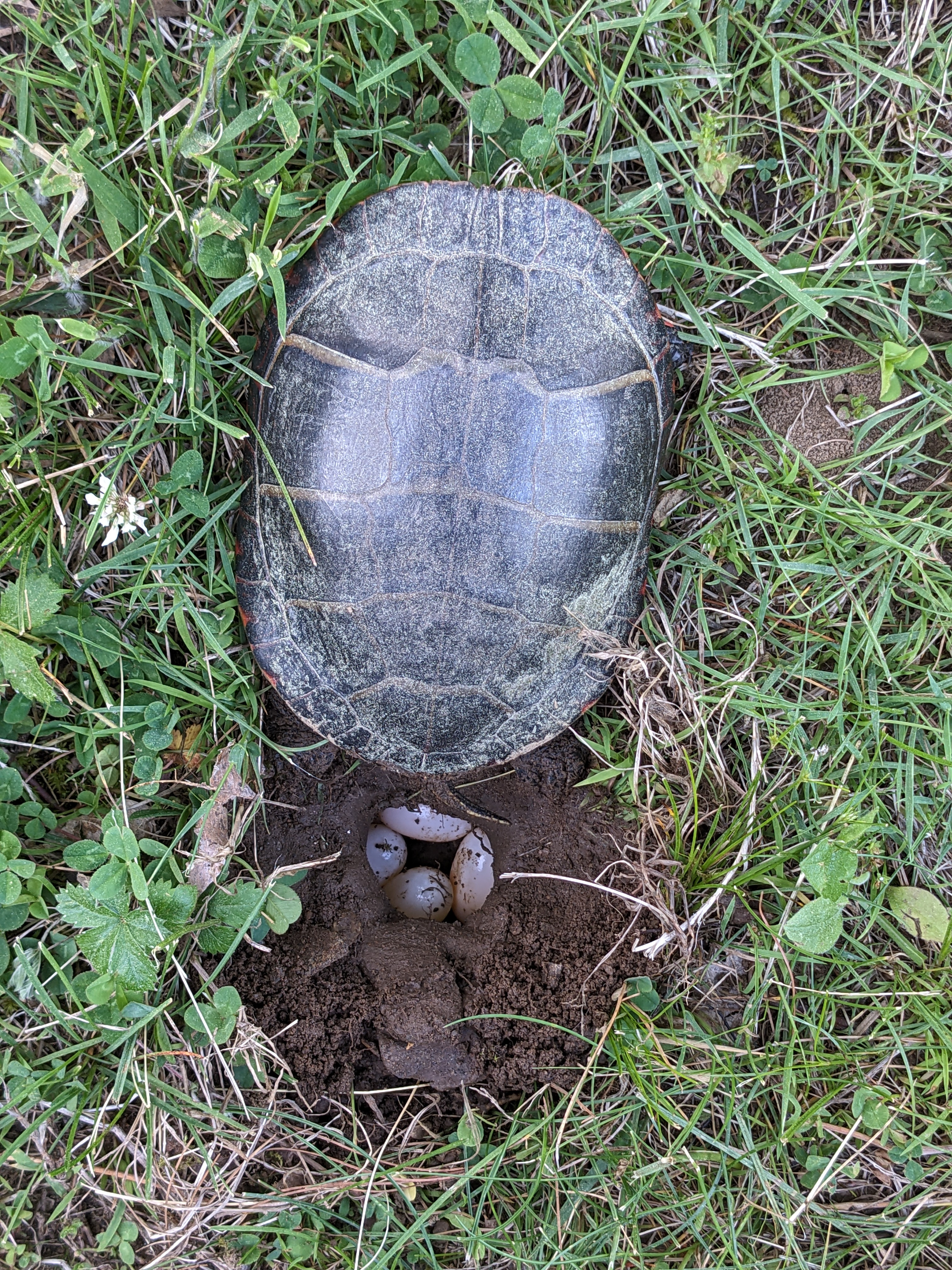
Eastern female laying eggs in a nest

The female's optimal body temperature while digging her nest is 29–30 °C (84–86 °F). If the weather is unsuitable, for instance a too hot night in the Southeast, she delays the process until later at night. Painted turtles in Virginia have been observed waiting three weeks to nest because of a hot drought.

While preparing to dig her nest, the female sometimes exhibits a mysterious preliminary behavior. She presses her throat against the ground of different potential sites, perhaps sensing moisture, warmth, texture, or smell, although her exact motivation is unknown. She may further temporize by excavating several false nests as the wood turtles also do.

The female relies on her hind feet for digging. She may accumulate so much sand and mud on her feet that her mobility is reduced, making her vulnerable to predators. To lighten her labors, she lubricates the area with her bladder water. Once the nest is complete, the female deposits into the hole. The freshly laid eggs are white, elliptical, porous, and flexible. From start to finish, the female's work may take four hours. Sometimes she remains on land overnight afterwards, before returning to her home water.

Females can lay five clutches per year, but two is a normal average after including the 30–50% of a population's females that do not produce any clutches in a given year. In some northern populations, no females lay more than one clutch per year. Bigger females tend to lay bigger eggs and more eggs per clutch. Clutch sizes of the subspecies vary, although the differences may reflect different environments, rather than different genetics. The two more northerly subspecies, western and midland, are larger and have more eggs per clutch—11.9 and 7.6, respectively—than the eastern (4.9). Within subspecies, also, the more northerly females lay larger clutches.

=== Growth ===
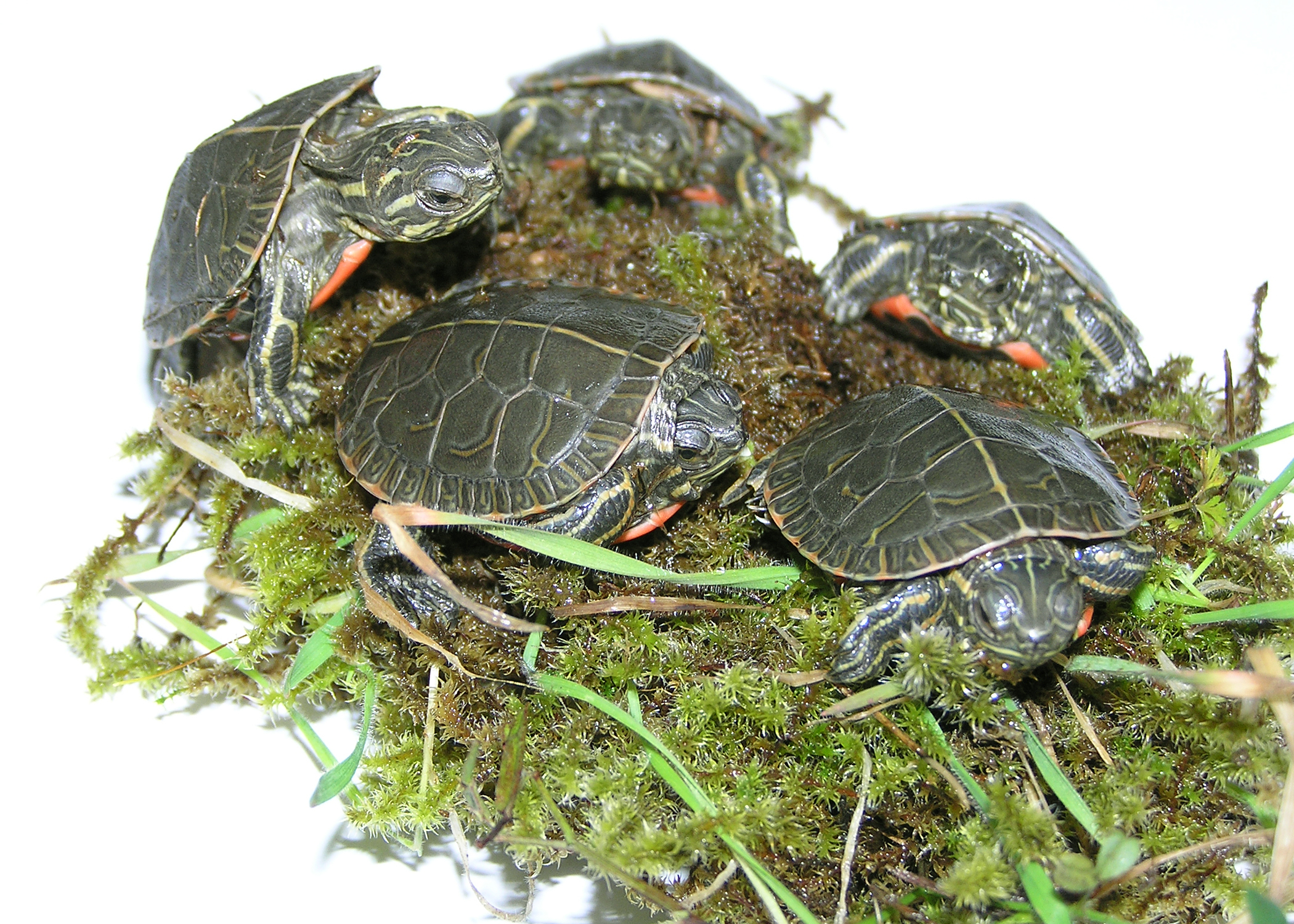
Hatchlings

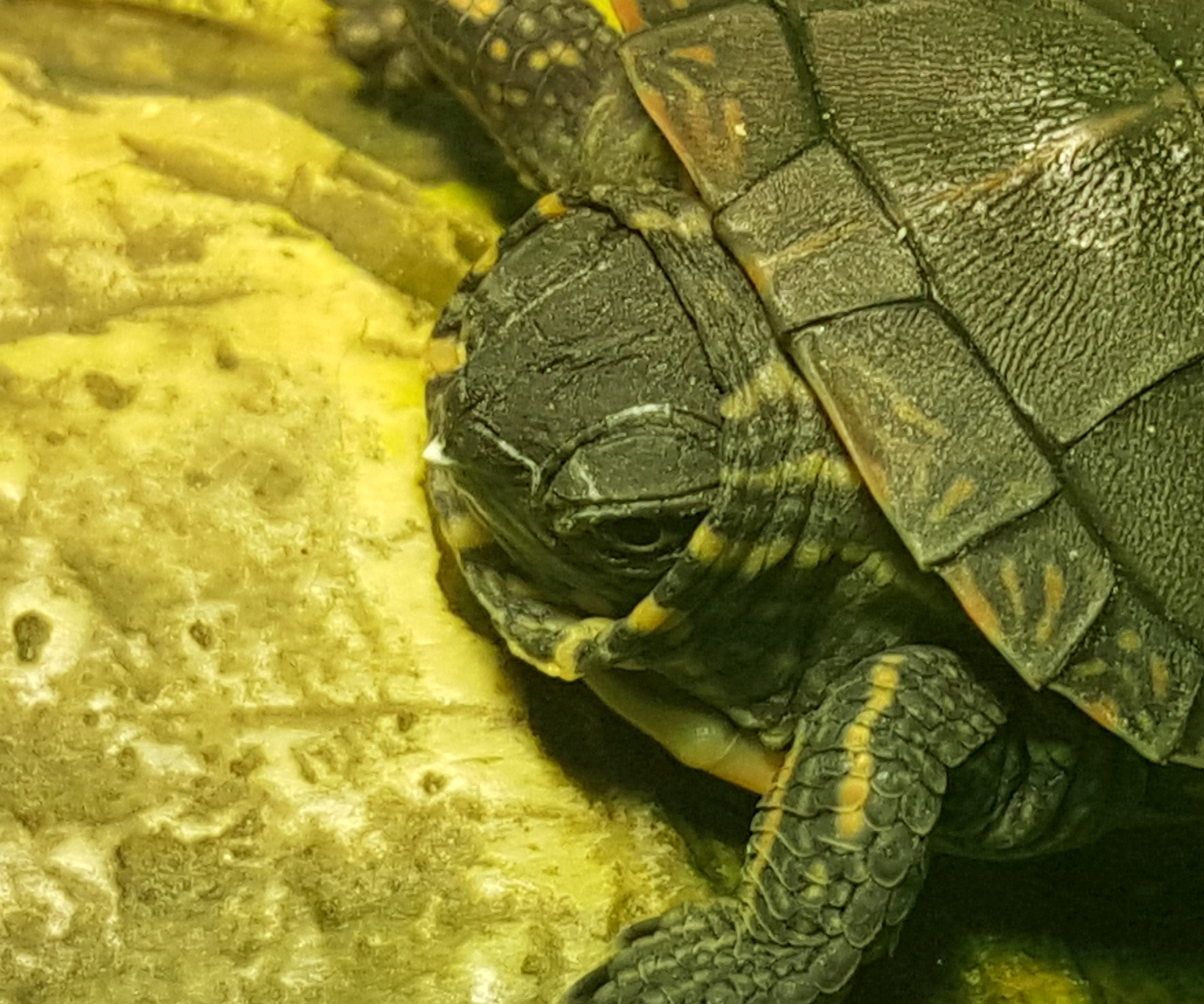
A painted turtle hatching with an egg tooth

Incubation lasts 72–80 days in the wild and for a similar period in artificial conditions. In August and September, the young turtle breaks out from its egg, using a special projection of its jaw called the egg tooth. Not all offspring leave the nest immediately, though. Hatchlings north of a line from Nebraska to northern Illinois to New Jersey typically arrange themselves symmetrically in the nest and overwinter to emerge the following spring.

The hatchling's ability to survive winter in the nest has allowed the painted turtle to extend its range farther north than any other American turtle. The painted turtle is genetically adapted to survive extended periods of subfreezing temperatures with blood that can remain supercooled and skin that resists penetration from ice crystals in the surrounding ground. The hardest freezes nevertheless kill many hatchlings.

Immediately after hatching, turtles are dependent on egg yolk material for sustenance. About a week to a week and a half after emerging from their eggs (or the following spring if emergence is delayed), hatchlings begin feeding to support growth. The young turtles grow rapidly at first, sometimes doubling their size in the first year. Growth slows sharply at sexual maturity and may stop completely. Likely owing to differences of habitat and food by water body, growth rates often differ from population to population in the same area. Among the subspecies, the western painted turtles are the quickest growers.

Females grow faster than males overall, and must be larger to mature sexually. In most populations males reach sexual maturity at 2–4 years old, and females at 6–10. Size and age at maturity increase with latitude; at the northern edge of their range, males reach sexual maturity at 7–9 years of age and females at 11–16.

== Behavior ==
=== Daily routine and basking ===
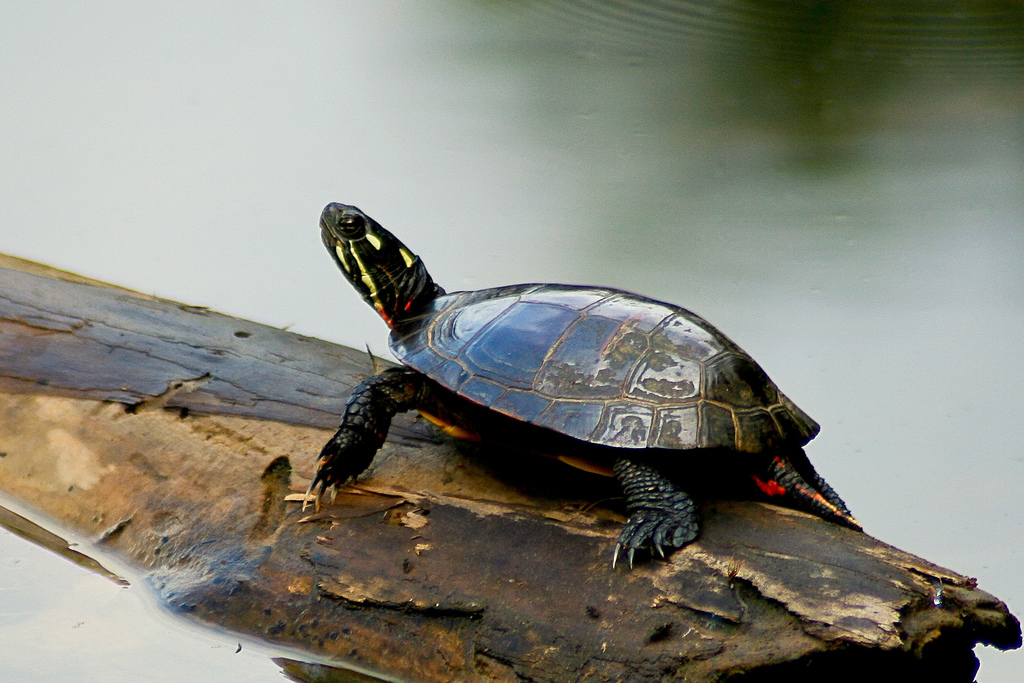
Basking for warmth

A cold-blooded reptile, the painted turtle regulates its temperature through its environment, notably by basking. All ages bask for warmth, often alongside other species of turtle. Sometimes more than 50 individuals are seen on one log together. Turtles bask on a variety of objects, often logs, but have even been seen basking on top of common loons that were covering eggs.

The turtle starts its day at sunrise, emerging from the water to bask for several hours. Warmed for activity, it returns to the water to forage. After becoming chilled, the turtle re-emerges for one to two more cycles of basking and feeding. At night, the turtle drops to the bottom of its water body or perches on an underwater object and sleeps.

To be active, the turtle must maintain an internal body temperature between 17–23 °C (63–73 °F). When fighting infection, it manipulates its temperature up to 5 °C (9.0 °F) higher than normal.

=== Seasonal routine and hibernation ===
In the spring, when the water reaches 15–18 °C (59–64 °F), the turtle begins actively foraging. However, if the water temperature exceeds 30 °C (86 °F), the turtle will not feed. In fall, the turtle stops foraging when temperatures drop below the spring set-point.

During the winter, the turtle hibernates. In the north, the inactive season may be as long as from October to March, while the southernmost populations may not hibernate at all. While hibernating, the body temperature of the painted turtle averages 6 °C (43 °F). Periods of warm weather bring the turtle out of hibernation, and even in the north, individuals have been seen basking in February.

The painted turtle hibernates by burying itself, either on the bottom of a body of water, near water in the shore-bank or the burrow of a muskrat, or in woods or pastures. When hibernating underwater, the turtle prefers shallow depths, no more than 2 m (7 ft). Within the mud, it may dig down an additional 1 m (3 ft). In this state, the turtle does not breathe, although if surroundings allow, it may get some oxygen through its skin. The species is one of the best-studied vertebrates able to survive long periods without oxygen. Adaptations of its blood chemistry, brain, heart, and particularly its shell allow the turtle to survive extreme lactic acid buildup while oxygen-deprived.

The painted turtle, like many other turtles, has the ability to breathe through its anus, or cloaca. This unusual adaptation, known as cloacal respiration, allows turtles to hibernate overwinter in colder climates where water surfaces may freeze over. Painted turtles also have specialized skin cells that absorb oxygen from the water. This process is known as cutaneous respiration. These two respiratory strategies, along with their other resilient traits, are vital to this reptile's success in colder climates.

=== Anoxia tolerance ===
During the winter months, painted turtles become ice-locked and spend their time in either hypoxic (low oxygen) or anoxic (no oxygen) regions of the pond or lake. Painted turtles essentially hold their breath until the following spring when the ice melts. As a result, painted turtles rely on anaerobic respiration, which leads to the production of lactic acid. However, painted turtles can tolerate long periods of anoxia due to three factors: a depressed metabolic rate, large glycogen stores in the liver, and sequestering lactate in the shell and releasing carbonate buffers to the extracellular fluid.

The shell of an adult painted turtle has the largest concentration of carbonate content recorded among animals. This large carbonate content helps the painted turtle buffer the accumulation of lactic acid during anoxia. Both the shell and skeleton release calcium and magnesium carbonates to buffer extracellular lactic acid. A painted turtle can also sequester 44% of total body lactate in their shell. Despite the shell's large buffering contribution, it does not experience any significant decrease in mechanical properties under natural conditions.

The duration of anoxia tolerance varies depending on the sub-species of painted turtle. The western painted turtle (C. picta bellii) can survive 170 days of anoxia, followed by the midland painted turtle (C. picta marginata) which can survive 150 days, and finally the eastern painted turtle (C. picta picta), which can survive 125 days. Differences in anoxia tolerance are partially attributed to the rate of lactate production and buffering capability in painted turtles. Furthermore, northern populations of painted turtles have a higher anoxia tolerance than southern populations.

Other anoxia tolerant freshwater turtles include: the southern painted turtle (Chrysemys dorsalis), which can survive 75–86 days of anoxia, the snapping turtle (Chelydra serpentina), which can survive 100 days under anoxia, and the map turtle (Graptemys geographica), which can survive 50 days of anoxia. One reason for the difference in duration between more anoxia-tolerant species and less anoxia-tolerant species is the turtle's ability to buffer lactic acid accumulation during anoxia.

Unlike adult painted turtles, hatchlings can survive only 40 days, but still exhibit high anoxia tolerance and freeze tolerance compared to other hatchling species (30 days for Chelydra serpentina, and 15 days for Graptemys geographica) due to cold winters.

=== Movement ===
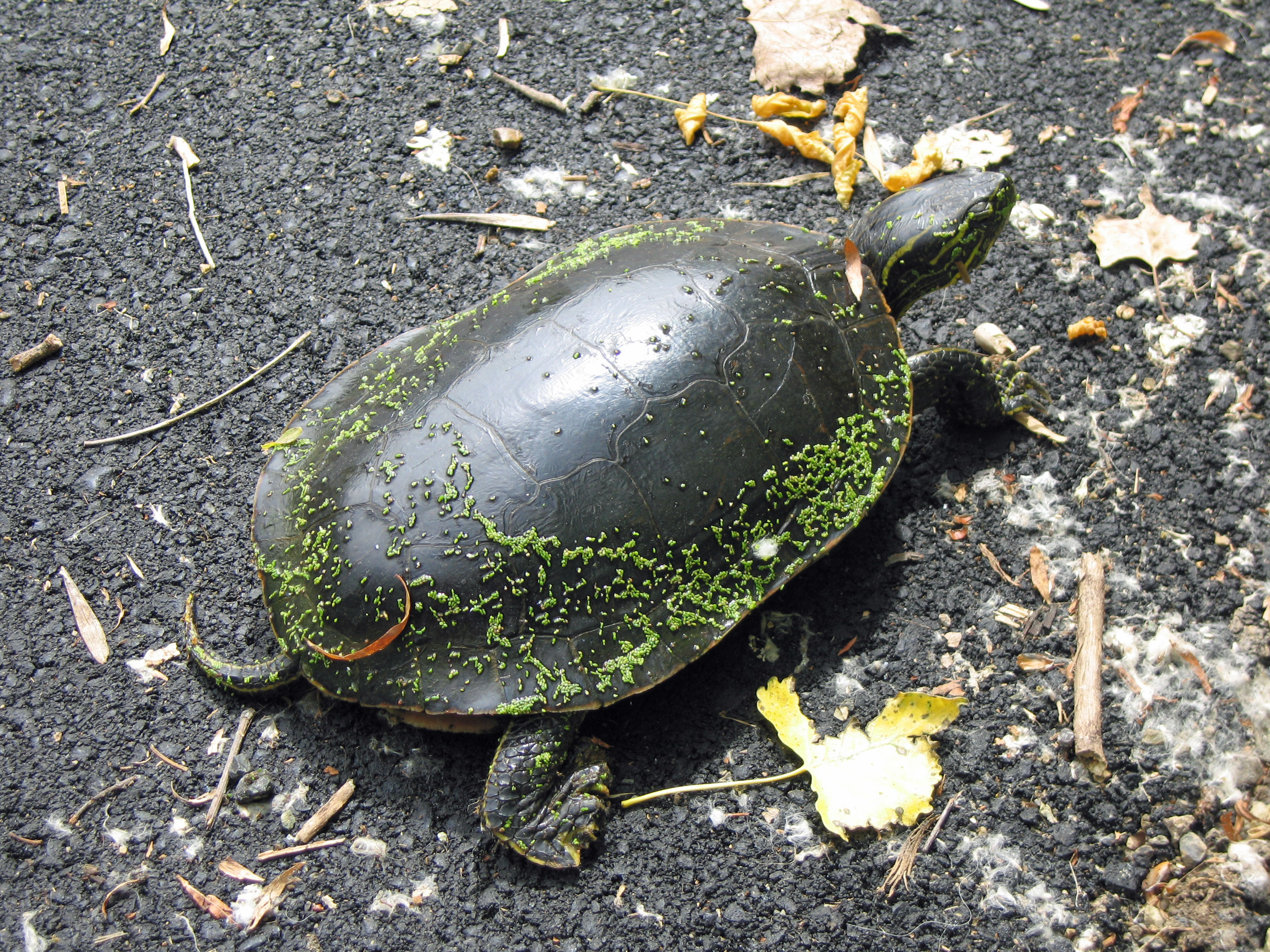
Moving on land

Searching for water, food, or mates, the painted turtles travel up to several kilometers at a time. During summer, in response to heat and water-clogging vegetation, the turtles may vacate shallow marshes for more permanent waters. Short overland migrations may involve hundreds of turtles together. If heat and drought are prolonged, the turtles will bury themselves and, in extreme cases, die.

Foraging turtles frequently cross lakes or travel linearly down creeks. Daily crossings of large ponds have been observed. Tag and release studies show that sex also drives turtle movement. Males travel the most, up to 26 km (16 mi), between captures; females the second most, up to 8 km (5 mi), between captures; and juveniles the least, less than 2 km (1.2 mi), between captures. Males move the most and are most likely to change wetlands because they seek mates.

The painted turtles, through visual recognition, have homing capabilities. Many individuals can return to their collection points after being released elsewhere, trips that may require them to traverse land. One experiment placed 98 turtles varying several-kilometer distances from their home wetland; 41 returned. When living in a single large body of water, the painted turtles can home from up to 6 km (4 mi) away. Another experiment found that if placed far enough away from water the turtles will just walk in straight paths and not orient towards water or in any specific direction which indicates a lack of homing ability. Females may use homing to help locate suitable nesting sites.

Eastern painted turtle movements may contribute to aquatic plant seed dispersal. A study done in Massachusetts found that the quantity of intact macrophyte seeds defecated by Eastern painted turtles can be high and that the seeds of specifically Nymphaea ordorata that were found in feces were capable of moderate to high level germination. As turtles move between ponds and habitats, they carry seeds along with them to new locations.

== Interaction with humans ==
=== Conservation ===
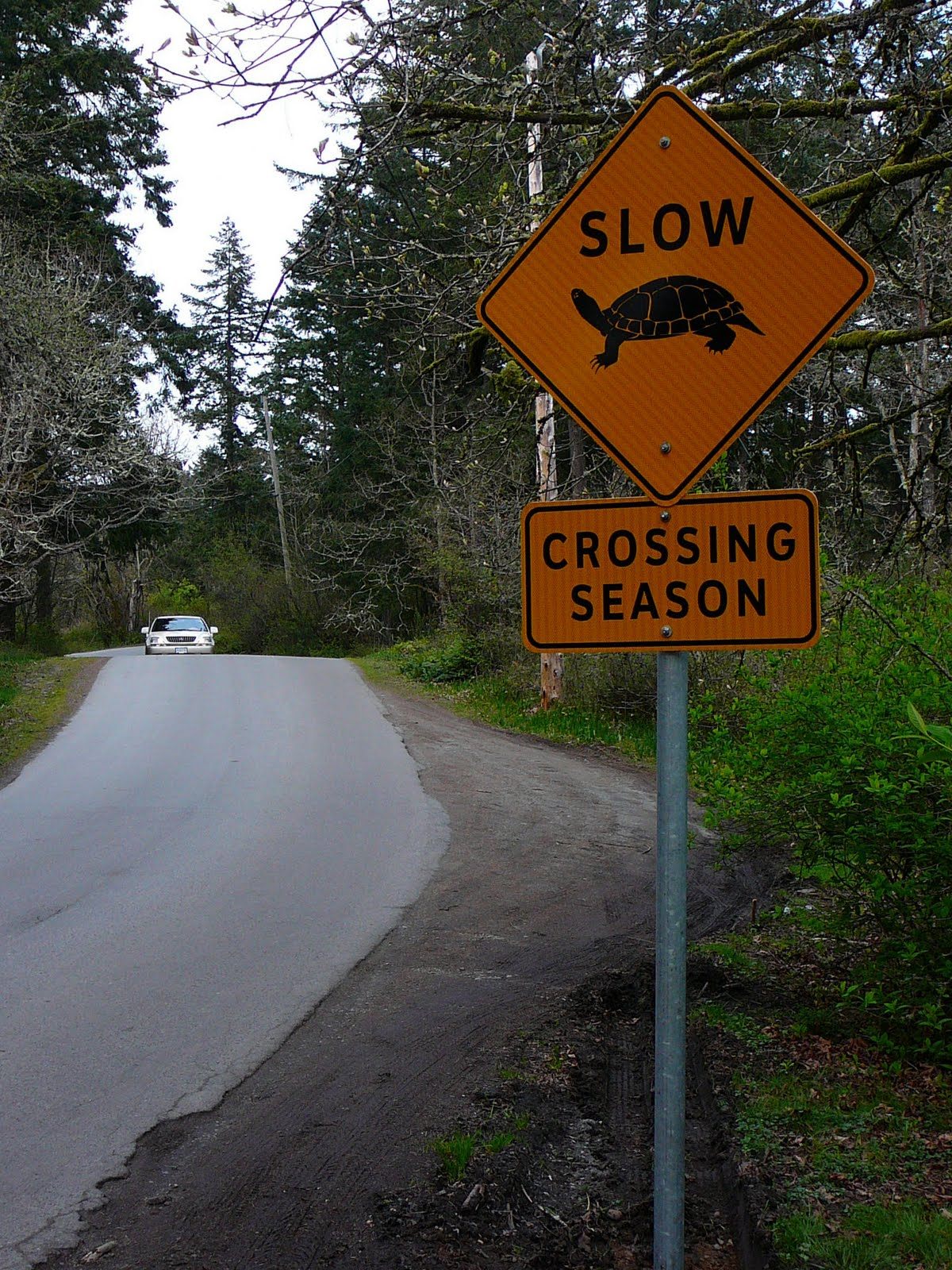
British Columbia road sign (for painted turtle protection)

The species is currently classified as least concern by the IUCN but populations have been subject to decline locally.

The decline in painted turtle populations is not a simple matter of dramatic range reduction, like that of the American bison. Instead the turtle is classified as G5 (demonstrably widespread) in its Natural Heritage Global Rank, and the IUCN rates it as a species of least concern. The painted turtle's high reproduction rate and its ability to survive in polluted wetlands and artificially made ponds have allowed it to maintain its range, but the post-Columbus settlement of North America has reduced its numbers.

Only within the Pacific Northwest is the turtle's range eroding. Even there, in Washington, the painted turtle is designated S5 (demonstrably widespread). However, in Oregon, the painted turtle is designated S2 (imperiled), and in British Columbia, the turtle's populations in the Coast and Interior regions are labelled "Threatened" and "Special Concern". The iconic painted turtle is popular in British Columbia, and the province is spending to save the painted turtle as only a few thousand turtles remain in the entire province.

Much is written about the different factors that threaten the painted turtle, but they are unquantified, with only inferences of relative importance. A primary threat category is habitat loss in various forms. Related to water habitat, there is drying of wetlands, clearing of aquatic logs or rocks (basking sites), and clearing of shoreline vegetation, which allows more predator access or increased human foot traffic. Related to nesting habitat, urbanization or planting can remove needed sunny soils.

Another significant human impact is roadkill—dead turtles, especially females, are commonly seen on summer roads. In addition to direct killing, roads genetically isolate some populations. Localities have tried to limit roadkill by constructing underpasses, highway barriers, and crossing signs. Oregon has introduced public education on turtle awareness, safe swerving, and safely assisting turtles across the road.

In the West, human-introduced bass, bullfrogs, and especially snapping turtles, have increased the predation of hatchlings. Outside the Southeast, where sliders are native, released pet red-eared slider turtles increasingly compete with painted turtles. In cities, increased urban predators (raccoons, canines, and felines) may impact painted turtles by eating their eggs.

Other factors of concern for the painted turtles include over-collection from the wild, released pets introducing diseases or reducing genetic variability, pollution, boating traffic, angler's hooks (the turtles are noteworthy bait-thieves), wanton shooting, and crushing by agricultural machines or golf course lawnmowers or all-terrain vehicles. Gervais and colleagues note that research itself impacts the populations and that much funded turtle trapping work has not been published. They advocate discriminating more on what studies are done, thereby putting fewer turtles into scientists' traps. Global warming represents an uncharacterized future threat.

As the most common turtle in Nova Scotia, the eastern painted turtle is not listed under the Species at Risk Act for conservation requirements.

Oregon conservation video: If video play problematic, try external links within citations. Note list of factors at 0:30–0:60 and hoop trap at 1:50–2:00.

=== Pets and other uses ===
"... we do not necessarily encourage people to collect these turtles. Turtles kept as pets usually soon become ill ... The best way to enjoy our native turtles is to observe them in the wild ... it would be better to take a picture than a 'picta'!"

— Pennsylvania Fish and Boat Commission

According to a trade data study, painted turtles were the second most popular pet turtles after red-eared sliders in the early 1990s. As of 2010, most U.S. states allow, but discourage, painted turtle pets, although Oregon forbids keeping them as pets, and Indiana prohibits their sale. U.S. federal law prohibits sale or transport of any turtle less than 10 cm (4 in), to limit human contact to salmonella. However, a loophole for scientific samples allows some small turtles to be sold, and illegal trafficking also occurs.

Painted turtle pet-keeping requirements are similar to those of the red-eared slider. Keepers are urged to provide them with adequate space and a basking site, and water that is regularly filtered and changed. Aquatic turtles are generally unsuitable pets for children, as they do not enjoy being held. Hobbyists have maintained turtles in captivity for decades. Painted turtles are long-lived pets, and have a lifespan of up to 40 years in captivity.

The painted turtle is sometimes eaten but is not highly regarded as food, as even the largest subspecies, the western painted turtle, is inconveniently small and larger turtles are available. Schools frequently dissect painted turtles, which are sold by biological supply companies; specimens often come from the wild but may be captive-bred. In the Midwest, turtle racing is popular at summer fairs.

=== Capture ===
Commercial harvesting of painted turtles in the wild is controversial and, increasingly, restricted. Wisconsin formerly had virtually unrestricted trapping of painted turtles but based on qualitative observations forbade all commercial harvesting in 1997. Neighboring Minnesota, where trappers collected more than 300,000 painted turtles during the 1990s, commissioned a study of painted turtle harvesting. Scientists found that harvested lakes averaged half the painted turtle density of off-limit lakes, and population modeling suggested that unrestricted harvests could produce a large decline in turtle populations. In response, Minnesota forbade new harvesters in 2002 and limited trap numbers. Although harvesting continued, subsequent takes averaged half those of the 1990s. In 2023, Minnesota banned the practice of commercial turtle trapping. As of 2009, painted turtles faced virtually unlimited harvesting in Arkansas, Iowa, Missouri, Ohio, and Oklahoma; since then, Missouri has prohibited their harvesting.

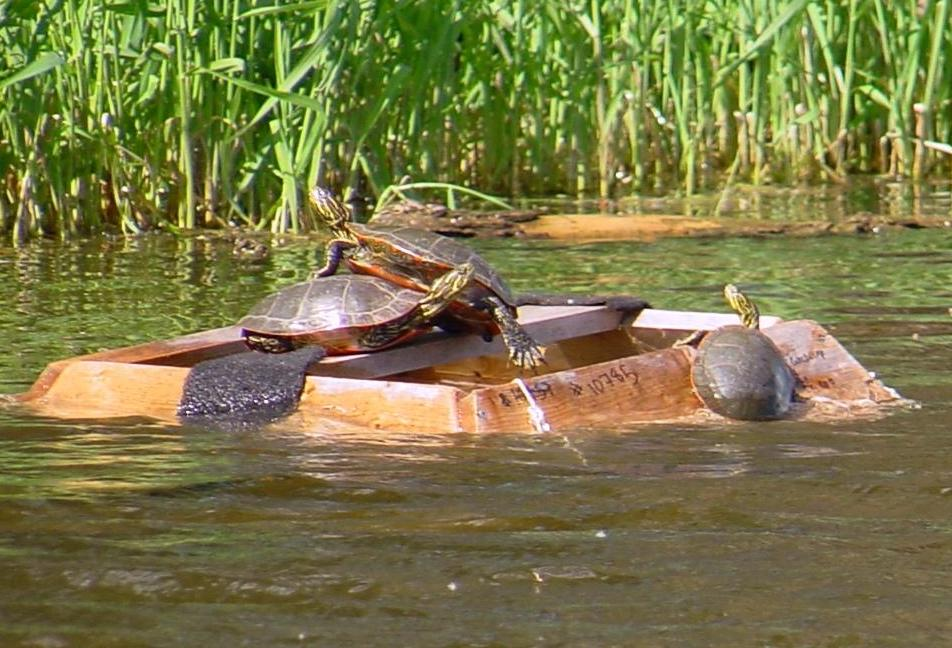
Basking trap in Minnesota

Individuals who trap painted turtles typically do so to earn additional income, selling a few thousand a year at $1–2 each. Many trappers have been involved in the trade for generations, and value it as a family activity. Some harvesters disagree with limiting the catch, saying the populations are not dropping.

Many U.S. state fish and game departments allow non-commercial taking of painted turtles under a creel limit, and require a fishing (sometimes hunting) license; (Note: State fish and game creel limits.) others completely forbid the recreational capture of painted turtles. Trapping is not allowed in Oregon, where western painted turtle populations are in decline, and in Missouri, where there are populations of both southern and western subspecies. In Canada, Ontario protects both subspecies present, the midland and western, and British Columbia protects its dwindling western painted turtles.

Capture methods are also regulated by locality. Typically trappers use either floating "basking traps" or partially submerged, baited "hoop traps". Trapper opinions, commercial records, and scientific studies show that basking traps are more effective for collecting painted turtles, while the hoop traps work better for collecting "meat turtles" (snapping turtles and soft-shell turtles). Nets, hand capture, and fishing with set lines are generally legal, but shooting, chemicals, and explosives are forbidden. (Note: State fish and game taking restrictions.)

=== Culture ===
"Whereas, the Painted Turtle is a hard worker and can withstand cold temperatures like the citizens of Vermont, and Whereas, the colors of the Painted Turtle represent the beauty of our state in autumn ... the General Assembly hereby recognizes the Painted Turtle as the official state reptile ..."

— Vermont J.R.S. 57

Native American tribes were familiar with the painted turtle—young braves were trained to recognize its splashing into water as an alarm—and incorporated it in folklore. A Potawatomi myth describes how the talking turtles, "Painted Turtle" and allies "Snapping Turtle" and "Box Turtle", outwit the village women. Painted Turtle is the star of the legend and uses his distinctive markings to trick a woman into holding him so he can bite her. An Illini myth recounts how Painted Turtle put his paint on to entice a chief's daughter into the water.

As of 2010, four U.S. states designated the painted turtle as official reptile. Vermont honored the reptile in 1994, following the suggestion of Cornwall Elementary School students. In 1995, Michigan followed, based on the recommendation of Niles fifth graders, who discovered the state lacked an official reptile. On February 2, 2005, Representative Bob Biggins introduced a bill to make the tiger salamander the official state amphibian of Illinois and to make the painted turtle the official state reptile. The bill was signed into law by Governor Rod Blagojevich on July 19, 2005. Colorado chose the western painted turtle in 2008, following the efforts of two succeeding years of Jay Biachi's fourth grade classes. In New York, the painted turtle narrowly lost (5,048 to 5,005, versus the common snapping turtle) a 2006 statewide student election for state reptile.

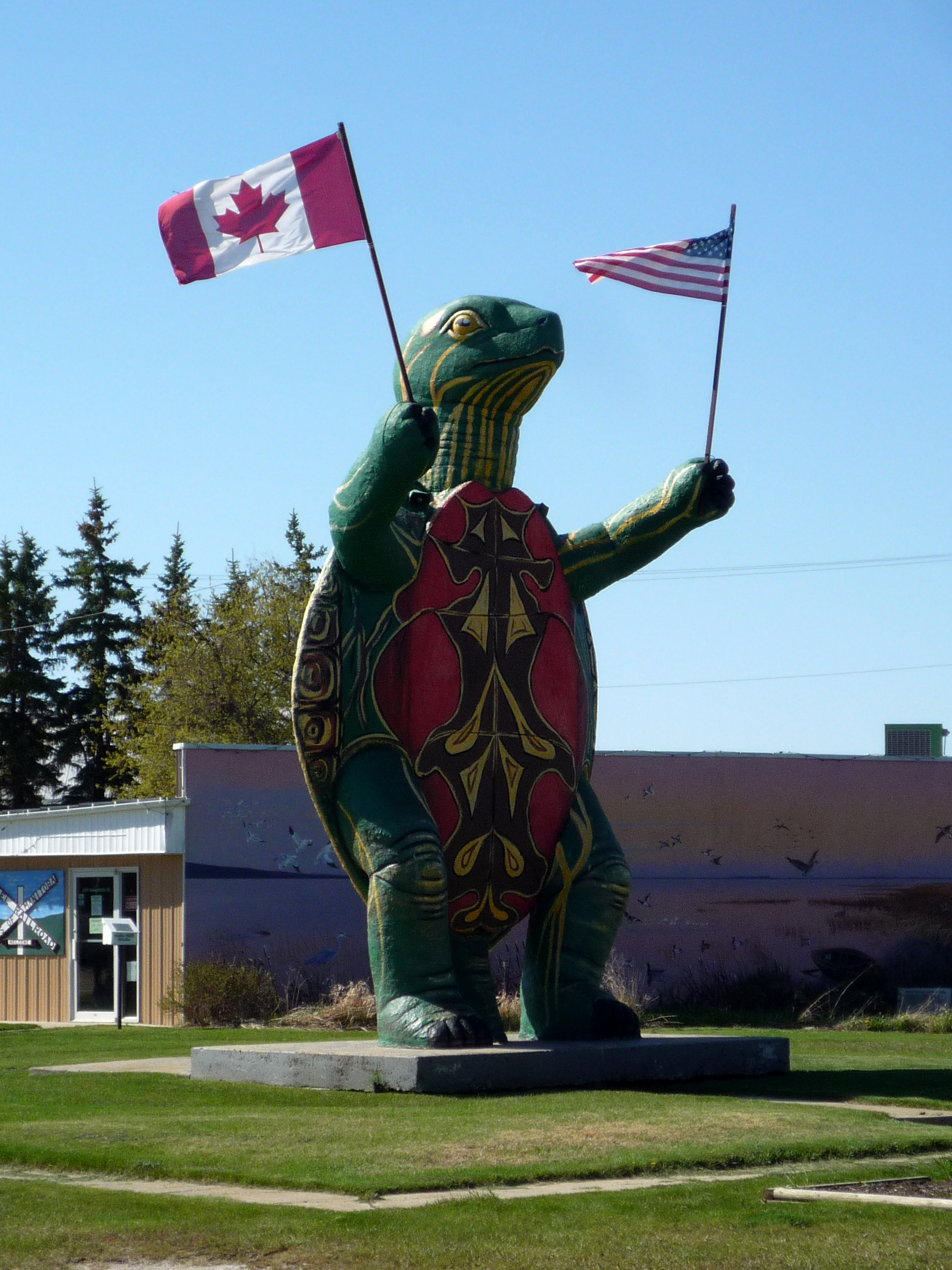
Tommy the Turtle

In the border town of Boissevain, Manitoba, a 10,000 lb (4,500 kg) western painted turtle, Tommy the Turtle, is a roadside attraction. The statue was built in 1974 to celebrate the Canadian Turtle Derby, a festival including turtle races that ran from 1972 to 2001.

Another Canadian admirer of the painted turtle is Jon Montgomery, who won the 2010 Olympic gold medal in skeleton (a form of sled) racing, while wearing a painted turtle painting on the crown of his helmet, prominently visible when he slid downhill. Montgomery, who also iconically tattooed his chest with a maple-leaf, explained his visual promotion of the turtle, saying that he had assisted one to cross the road. BC Hydro referred to Montgomery's action when describing its own sponsorship of conservation research for the turtle in British Columbia.

Several private entities use the painted turtle as a symbol. Wayne State University Press operates an imprint "named after the Michigan state reptile" that "publishes books on regional topics of cultural and historical interest". In California, The Painted Turtle is a camp for ill children, founded by Paul Newman. Painted Turtle Winery of British Columbia trades on the "laid back and casual lifestyle" of the turtle with a "job description to bask in the sun". Also, there is an Internet company in Michigan, a guesthouse in British Columbia, and a café in Maine that use the painted turtle commercially.

In children's books, the painted turtle is a popular subject, with at least seven books published between 2000 and 2010. (Note: 2000–2010 children's books on the painted turtle.)

== Notes and references ==
=== Bibliography ===
- Carr, Archie (1952). "Genus Chrysemys: The Painted Turtles". Handbook of Turtles: The Turtles of the United States, Canada, and Baja California. Handbooks of American Natural History. Binghamton, New York: Comstock Publishing Associates a Division of Cornell University Press. pp. 213–234. ISBN 0-8014-8254-2.
- Dupuis, Linda (2006). "COSEWIC assessment and status report on the western painted turtle Chrysemys picta bellii" (PDF). Committee on the Status of Endangered Wildlife in Canada. p. 29.
- COSEWIC (2016). "COSEWIC assessment and status report on the Western Painted Turtle Chrysemys picta bellii in Canada". Committee on the Status of Endangered Wildlife in Canada.
- Ernst, Carl H.; Barbour, Roger William (1972). "Chrysemys picta". Turtles of the United States. Lexington, Kentucky: The University Press of Kentucky. pp. 138–146. ISBN 0-8131-1272-9.
- Ernst, Carl H.; Barbour, Roger William (1989). "Chrysemys". Turtles of the World. Washington, D.C., and London: Smithsonian Institution Press. pp. 201–203. ISBN 0-87474-414-8.
- Ernst, Carl H.; Barbour, Roger William; Lovich, Jeffery E. (1994). Dutro, Nancy P. (ed.). Turtles of the United States and Canada. Washington and London: Smithsonian Institution Press. pp. 276–296. ISBN 1-56098-346-9.
- Ernst, Carl H.; Lovich, Jeffery E. (2009). Turtles of the United States and Canada (2nd ed.). JHU Press. pp. 185–259. ISBN 978-0-8018-9121-2.
- Fritz, Uwe; Havaš, Peter (2007). "Checklist of Chelonians of the World". Vertebrate Zoology. 57 (2): 149–368. doi:10.3897/vz.57.e30895.
- Gervais, Jennifer; Rosenberg, Daniel; Barnes, Susan; Puchy, Claire; Stewart, Elaine (September 2009). "Conservation assessment for the western painted turtle in Oregon: (Chrysemys picta bellii) version 1.1" (PDF) (technical report). U.S.D.A. Forest Service. pp. 4–61. Archived from the original (PDF) on 2011-08-13.
- Mann, Melissa (May 2007). A taxonomic study of the morphological variation and intergradation of Chrysemys picta (Schneider) (Emydidae, Testudines) in West Virginia (Master's thesis). Marshall University. pp. i–64.
- Packard, Gary C.; Packard, Mary J.; Morjan, Carrie L.; Janzen, Fredric J. (2002). "Cold-Tolerance of Hatchling Painted Turtles (Chrysemys picta bellii) from the Southern Limit of Distribution". Journal of Herpetology. 36 (2): 300–304. doi:10.2307/1566006. JSTOR 1566006.
- Rhodin, Anders G.J.; van Dijk, Peter Paul; Inverson, John B.; Shaffer, H. Bradley (2010-12-14). "Turtles of the world, 2010 update: Annotated checklist of taxonomy, synonymy, distribution and conservation status" (PDF). Chelonian Research Monographs. 5: 000.89 – 000.138. Archived from the original (PDF) on 2011-07-17.
