= Franklin J. W. Schmidt =

Franklin James White Schmidt (July 25, 1901, in Lake Forest, Illinois – August 7, 1935, in Stanley, Wisconsin) was an American naturalist, noted as one of the first practitioners of the field of "wildlife management". Hired by Wisconsin, Schmidt's main work was on the prairie grouse, and its habits in the central marshes of Wisconsin. He published one paper on feeding habits of the grouse. At the time of his death in a house fire at his home, he planned to start a consulting service to assist other Midwestern states in managing the prairie grouse, which would have also allowed him to continue to collect even more information on the species. Seven other papers in preparation on the prairie grouse were destroyed in the fire that killed Schmidt and his mother. Also consumed by the flames were many other field samples.

Regarding rodents and reptiles, Schmidt published five papers. In the 1920s Schmidt worked for Chicago's Field Museum, and he participated in their expeditions to South America and Guatemala. On a 1934 expedition to Guatemala he collected many ectoparasites of mammals, including the batfly Joblingia schmidti, which is named for him. His painted turtle paper with Bishop established the modern view of that genus as a single species with multiple subspecies. Schmidt's brother, Karl Patterson Schmidt, who lived thirty years longer, was a noted herpetologist, who died by snakebite.

== Works ==
- (1926). "List of the Amphibians and Reptiles of Worden Township, Clark County, Wisconsin". Copeia (154): 131–132.
- (1927). "Pitymys pinetorum scalopsoides in Wisconsin". Journal of Mammalogy 8: 248.
- (1931). "The mammals of western Clark County, Wisconsin". J. Mammal. 12: 99–117, 1 map.
- (1936). "The winter food of Sharp-tailed Grouse and Pinnated Grouse in Wisconsin". Wilson Bulletin 48: 186–203.

With Sherman C. Bishop

- (1931). "The painted turtles of the genus Chrysemys ". Publications of the Field Museum of Natural History, Zoological Series 18: 121–139, figures 1-27.

With Karl Patterson Schmidt

- (1925). "New coral snakes from South America". Publ. Field Mus. Nat. Hist., Zool. Ser. 12: 127–134, Plates 11–12.
