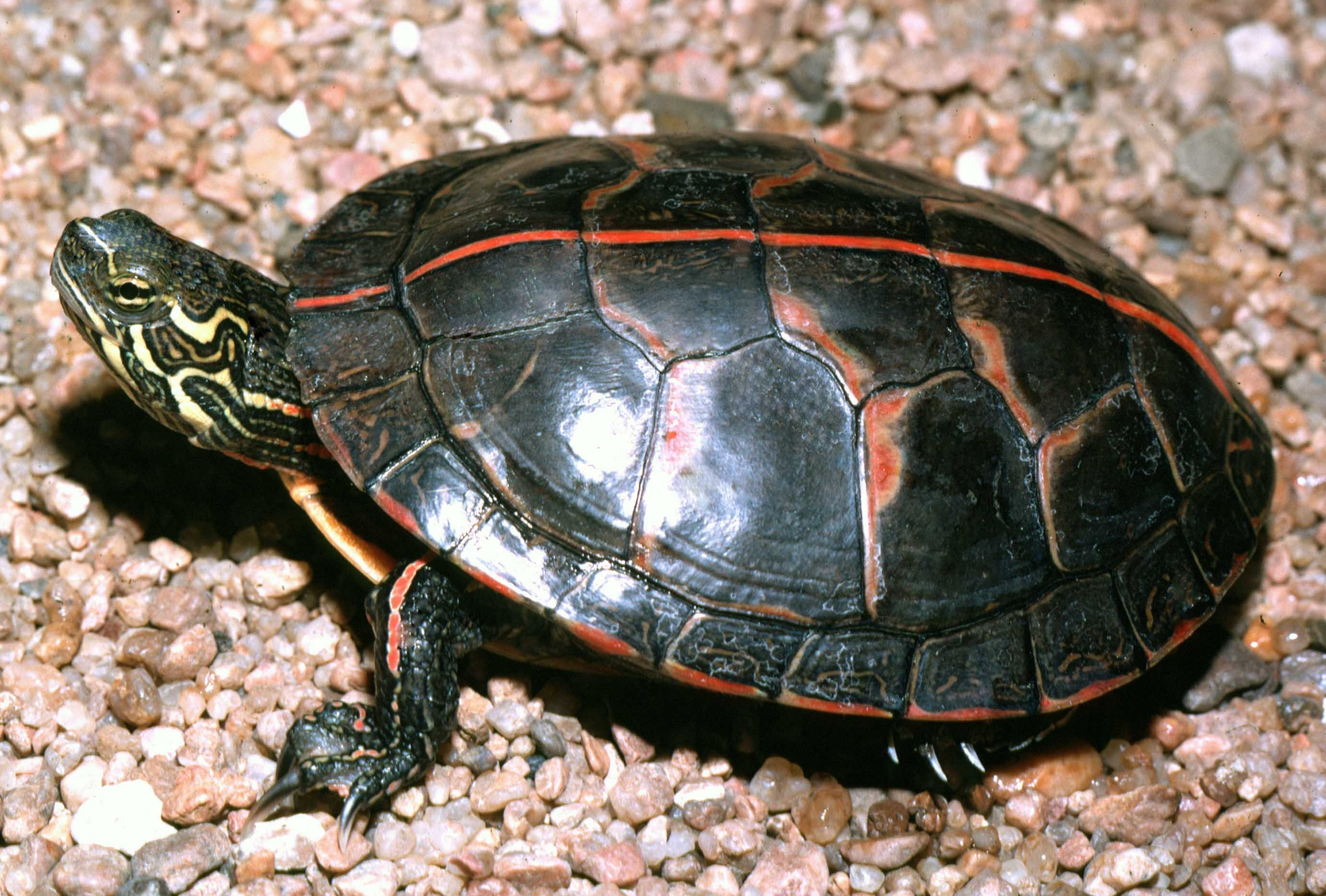

Scientific classification
- Domain: Eukaryota
- Kingdom: Animalia
- Phylum: Chordata
- Class: Reptilia
- Order: Testudines
- Suborder: Cryptodira
- Superfamily: Testudinoidea
- Family: Emydidae
- Genus: Chrysemys
- Species: C. dorsalis

Binomial name
- Chrysemys dorsalis Agassiz, 1857

Synonyms
- Chrysemys picta dorsalis

= Southern painted turtle =

Species of turtle

The southern painted turtle (Chrysemys dorsalis) is a species of turtle in the family Emydidae. It is endemic to the south-central United States.

== Taxonomy ==
The southern painted turtle was formerly considered a subspecies of the more widespread painted turtle (C. picta) as C. picta dorsalis, and its exact status is still debated.

Since the 1950s, the southern painted turtle, alongside the subspecies of C. picta, was generally thought to have originated following geographic isolation as a result of the Quaternary glaciation, with the populations being isolated for too short a time to fully diverge into distinct species. However, David E. Starkey and collaborators advanced a new view of the subspecies in 2003. Based on a study of the mitochondrial DNA, they rejected the glacial development theory and argued that the southern painted turtle should be elevated to a separate species, C. dorsalis, while the other subspecies should be collapsed into one and not differentiated. However, this proposition was largely unrecognized because successful breeding between all subspecies was documented wherever they overlapped. Nevertheless, in 2010, the IUCN recognized both C. dorsalis and C. p. dorsalis as valid names for the southern painted turtle. In 2014, the Turtle Taxonomy Working Group (TTWG) and the Reptile Database reclassified C. dorsalis as a distinct species, although the TTWG also recognized C. p. dorsalis as a valid name. The TTWG continued to recognize C. dorsalis as a distinct species in their 2021 publication.

== Description ==
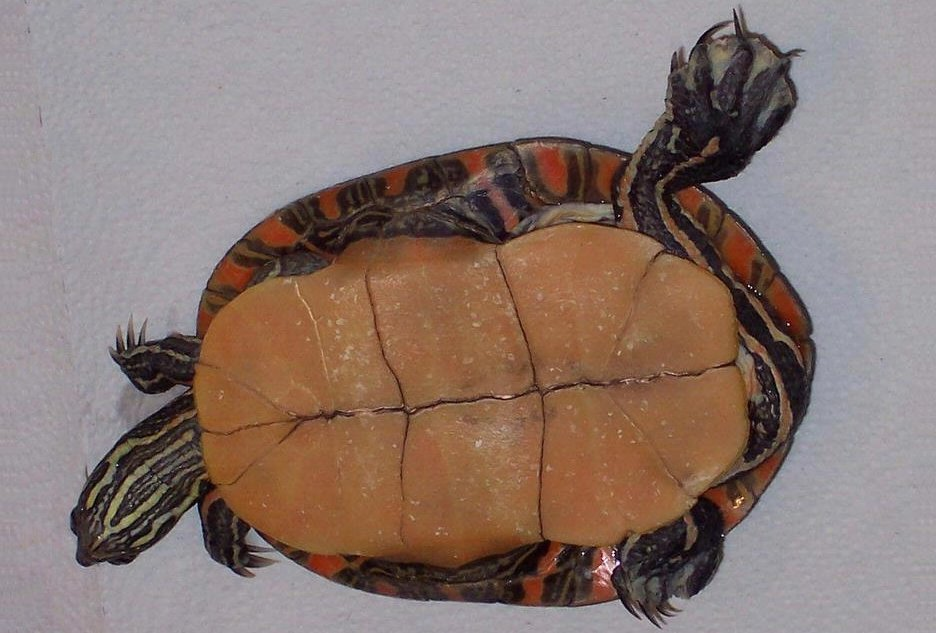
Underside

The smallest member of Chrysemys, it is smaller than any of the subspecies of C. picta at about 10–14 cm (4–6 in) long. Its top stripe is a prominent red, and its bottom shell is tan and spotless or nearly so.

== Ecology ==
This species' diet changes with age. Juveniles' diet consists of 13% vegetation, while the adults eat 88% vegetation. This perhaps shows that the turtle prefers small larvae and other prey, but can only obtain significant amounts while young. The reversal of feeding habits with age has also been seen in the false map turtle, which inhabits some of the same range. The most common plants eaten by adult southern painted turtles are duckweed and algae, and the most common prey items are dragonfly larvae and crayfish.

== Distribution ==
The southern painted turtle ranges from extreme southern Illinois and Missouri, roughly along the Mississippi River Valley, to the south. In Arkansas, it branches out to the west towards Texas, where it is found in the far northeast part of that state (Caddo Lake region) as well as extreme southeastern Oklahoma (McCurtain County). It is found in much of Louisiana, where it reaches the Gulf of Mexico (in fresh water). Eastward it is found in western Tennessee, northern Mississippi and much of Alabama, including the Gulf Coast city of Mobile. An isolated population in central Texas has been reported but is now believed to be non-native.

== Life history ==
It has a smaller clutch size than C. picta, at about 4.2 eggs per clutch.

== Bibliography ==
- Carr, Archie (1952). "Genus Chrysemys: The Painted Turtles". Handbook of Turtles: The Turtles of the United States, Canada, and Baja California. Handbooks of American Natural History. Binghamton, New York: Comstock Publishing Associates a Division of Cornell University Press. ISBN 0-8014-8254-2.
- Ernst, Carl H.; Lovich, Jeffery E. (2009). Turtles of the United States and Canada (2nd ed.). JHU Press. pp. 185–259. ISBN 978-0-8018-9121-2.
- Fritz, Uwe; Havaš, Peter (2007). "Checklist of Chelonians of the World". Vertebrate Zoology. 57 (2): 149–368. doi:10.3897/vz.57.e30895. S2CID 87809001.
- Mann, Melissa (May 2007). A taxonomic study of the morphological variation and intergradation of Chrysemys picta (Schneider) (Emydidae, Testudines) in West Virginia (Master's thesis). Marshall University. pp. i–64.
- Rhodin, Anders G.J.; van Dijk, Peter Paul; Inverson, John B.; Shaffer, H. Bradley (2010-12-14). "Turtles of the world, 2010 update: Annotated checklist of taxonomy, synonymy, distribution and conservation status" (PDF). Chelonian Research Monographs. 5: 000.89 – 000.138. Archived from the original (PDF) on 2011-07-17.
