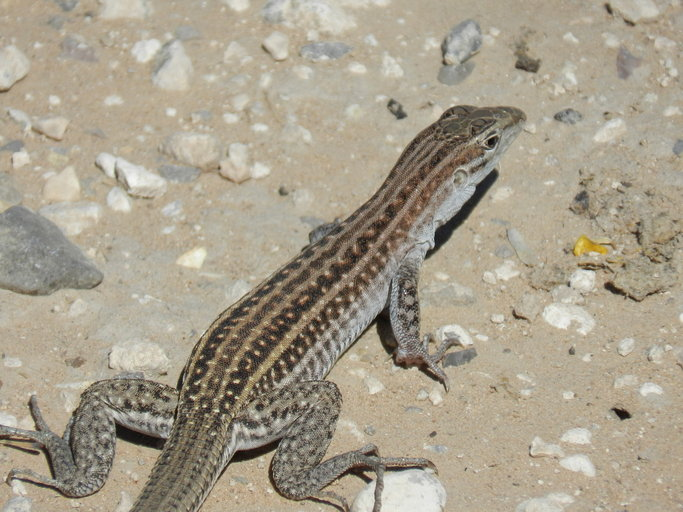

Conservation status
- Least Concern (IUCN 3.1)

Scientific classification
- Domain: Eukaryota
- Kingdom: Animalia
- Phylum: Chordata
- Class: Reptilia
- Order: Squamata
- Family: Teiidae
- Genus: Aspidoscelis
- Species: A. exsanguis

Binomial name
- Aspidoscelis exsanguis (Lowe, 1956)

Synonyms
- Cnemidophorus sacki exsanguis Lowe, 1956; Cnemidophorus exsanguis Stebbins, 1985

= Chihuahuan spotted whiptail =

Species of lizard

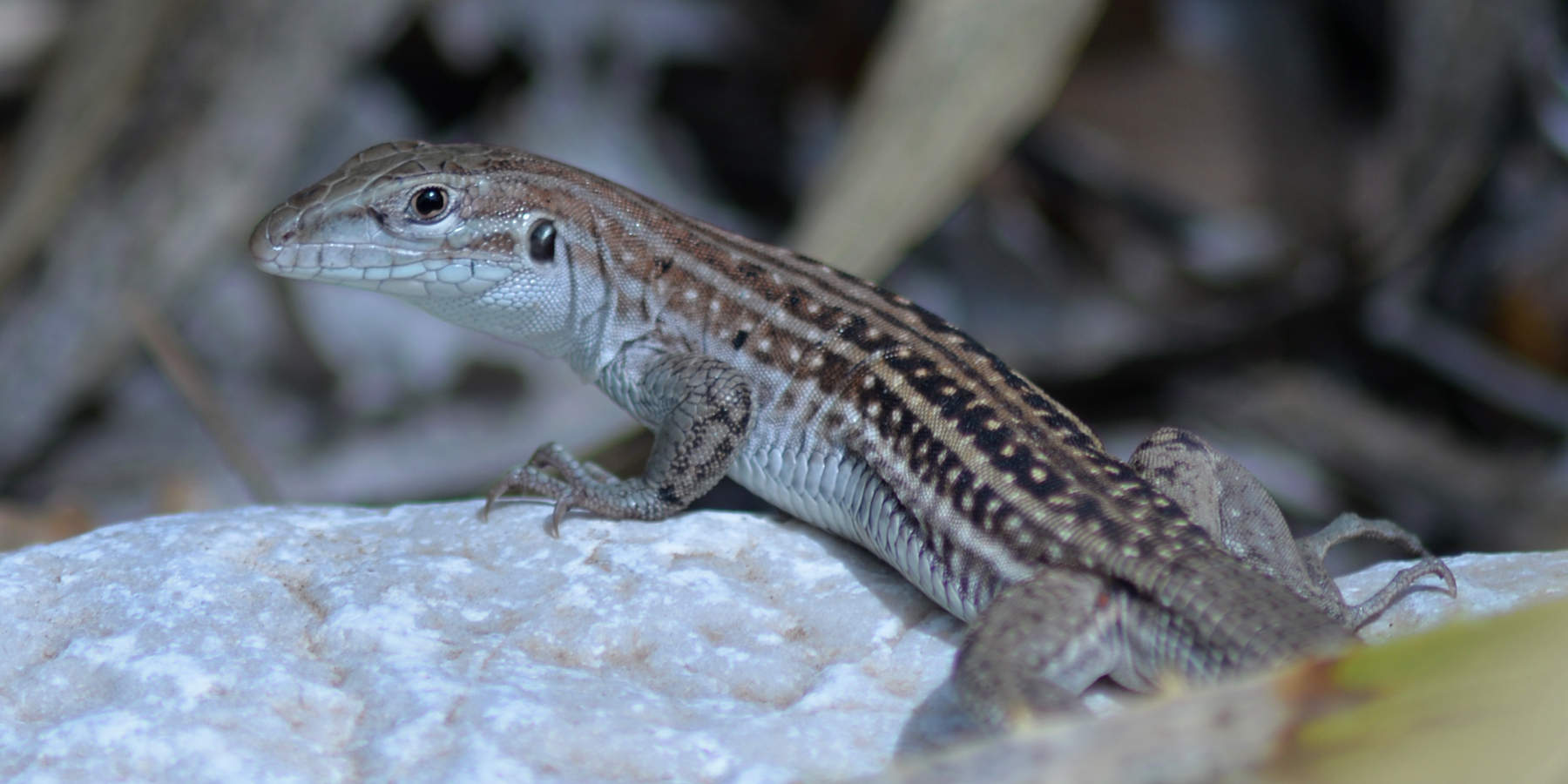
Chihuahuan spotted whiptail (Aspidoscelis exsanguis), in situ, Culberson County, Texas (14 May 2018)

The Chihuahuan spotted whiptail (Aspidoscelis exsanguis) is a species of lizard native to the United States in southern Arizona, southern New Mexico and southwestern Texas, and northern Mexico in northern Chihuahua and northern Sonora.

The species is believed to be the result of extensive hybridization between the little striped whiptail, Aspidoscelis inornatus, the plateau spotted whiptail, Aspidoscelis septemvittatus, and the western Mexico whiptail, Aspidoscelis costatus. It is one of many lizard species known to be parthenogenetic.

== Description ==
The Chihuahuan spotted whiptail grows from 9.5 to 12 inches in length. It is typically a reddish-brown in color, with six lighter colored stripes that run the length of the body, with spotting between the stripes. The underside is white or sometimes pale blue. It is slender-bodied with a tail nearly three times its body length.

== Biology ==
Like most whiptailed lizards, the Chihuahua spotted whiptail is diurnal and insectivorous.

This species can be found in many kinds of mostly arid habitat, including desert, desert grassland, dry basin forests, and oak, pine, and juniper woodland, where it lives in washes and canyons. It digs holes to lay eggs.

== Conservation ==
This is not considered to be a threatened species.
