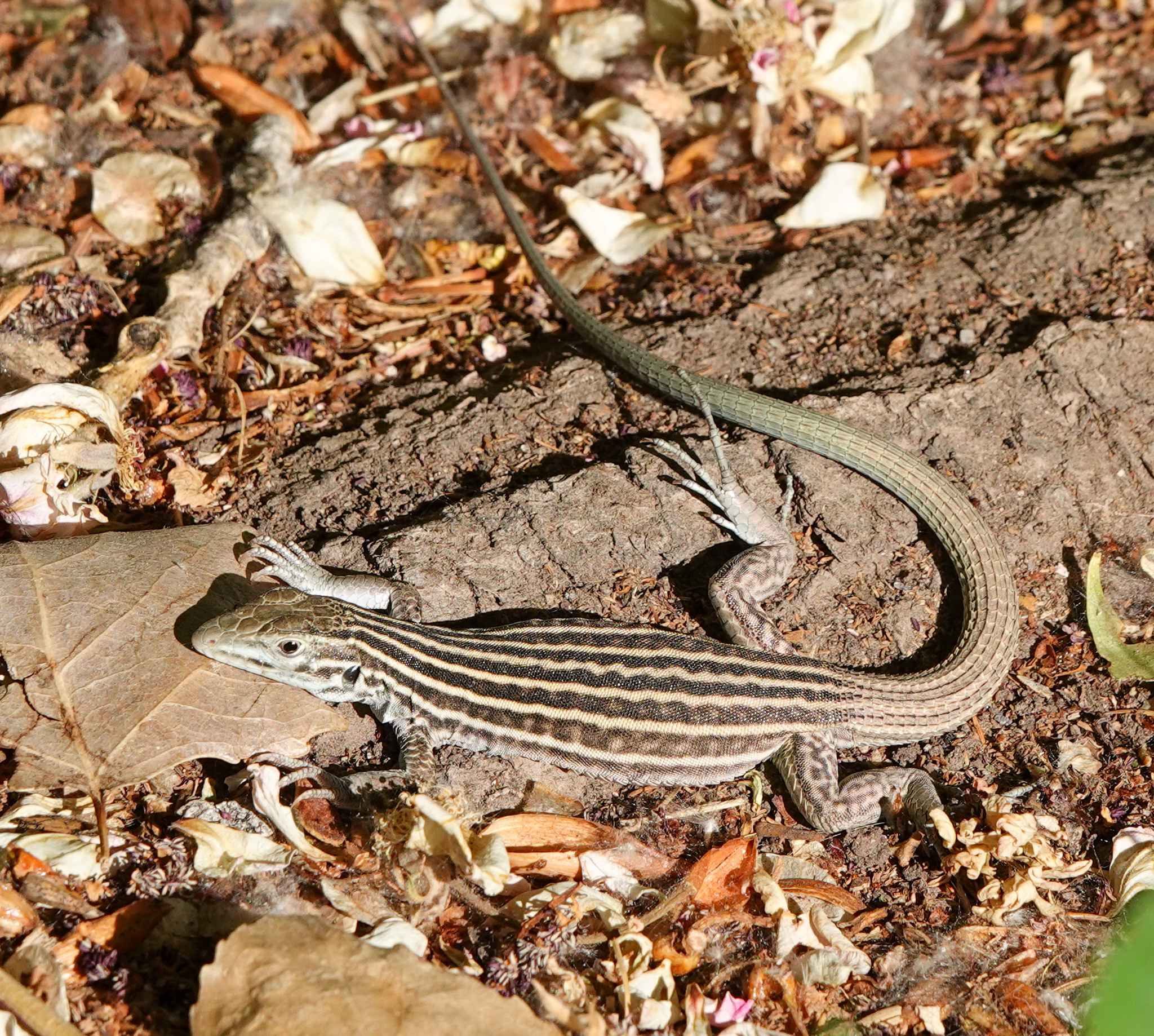
- In Albuquerque, New Mexico

Conservation status
- Least Concern (IUCN 3.1)

Scientific classification
- Kingdom: Animalia
- Phylum: Chordata
- Class: Reptilia
- Order: Squamata
- Family: Teiidae
- Genus: Aspidoscelis
- Species: A. neomexicanus

Binomial name
- Aspidoscelis neomexicanus Lowe & Zweifel, 1952

Synonyms
- Cnemidophorus perplexus Baird & Girard, 1852; Cnemidophorus neomexicanus Lowe & Zweifel, 1952

= New Mexico whiptail =

Species of reptile

The New Mexico whiptail (Aspidoscelis neomexicanus) is a female-only species of lizard found in New Mexico and Arizona in the southwestern United States, and in Chihuahua in northern Mexico. It is the official state reptile of New Mexico. It is one of many lizard species known to be parthenogenetic. Individuals of the species can be created either through the hybridization of the little striped whiptail (A. inornatus) and the western whiptail (A. tigris), or through the parthenogenetic reproduction of an adult New Mexico whiptail.

The hybridization of these species prevents healthy males from forming, whereas males exist in one parent species (see sexual differentiation). Parthenogenesis allows the all-female population to reproduce. This combination of interspecific hybridization and parthenogenesis exists as a reproductive strategy in several species of whiptail lizard within the genus Aspidoscelis to which the New Mexico whiptail belongs.

== Description ==
The New Mexico whiptail grows from 6.5 to 9.1 in (16.5 to 23 cm) in length, and is typically overall brown or black in color with seven pale yellow stripes from head to tail. Light colored spots often occur between the stripes. They have a white or pale blue underside, with a blue or blue-green colored throat. They are slender bodied, with a long tail that is more commonly blue-green in their infant stage, melding into the same spotted brown and yellow color as they age.

== Behavior ==
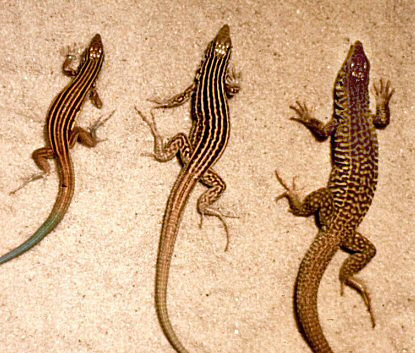
Little striped whiptail, (A. inornatus), New Mexico whiptail (A. neomexicanus) and western whiptail (A. tigris).

Like most other whiptail lizards, the New Mexico whiptail is diurnal and insectivorous, feeding primarily on spiders and insects such as termites, beetles, grasshoppers, ants, caterpillars, moths and butterflies. They are wary, energetic, and fast moving, darting for cover if approached. They are found in a wide variety of semi-arid habitats, including grassland, rocky areas, shrubland, or mountainside woodlands. Reproduction occurs through parthenogenesis, with up to four unfertilized eggs being laid in mid summer, and hatching approximately eight weeks later. This species is active during the day, often retreating from the heat from noon to mid-afternoon during periods of high temperatures. They hibernate but are active from mid-March through mid-October.

The New Mexico whiptail lizard is a crossbreed of a western whiptail, which lives in the desert, and the little striped whiptail, which favors grasslands. The whiptail engages in mating behavior with other females of its own species, giving rise to the nickname "lesbian lizards". A common theory is that this behavior stimulates ovulation, as those that do not "mate" do not lay eggs.

== Popular culture ==
The New Mexico whiptail, sometimes dubbed the "leaping lesbian lizard," has been considered a gay icon in online LGBTQ+ spaces.

== See also ==
- Whiptail
