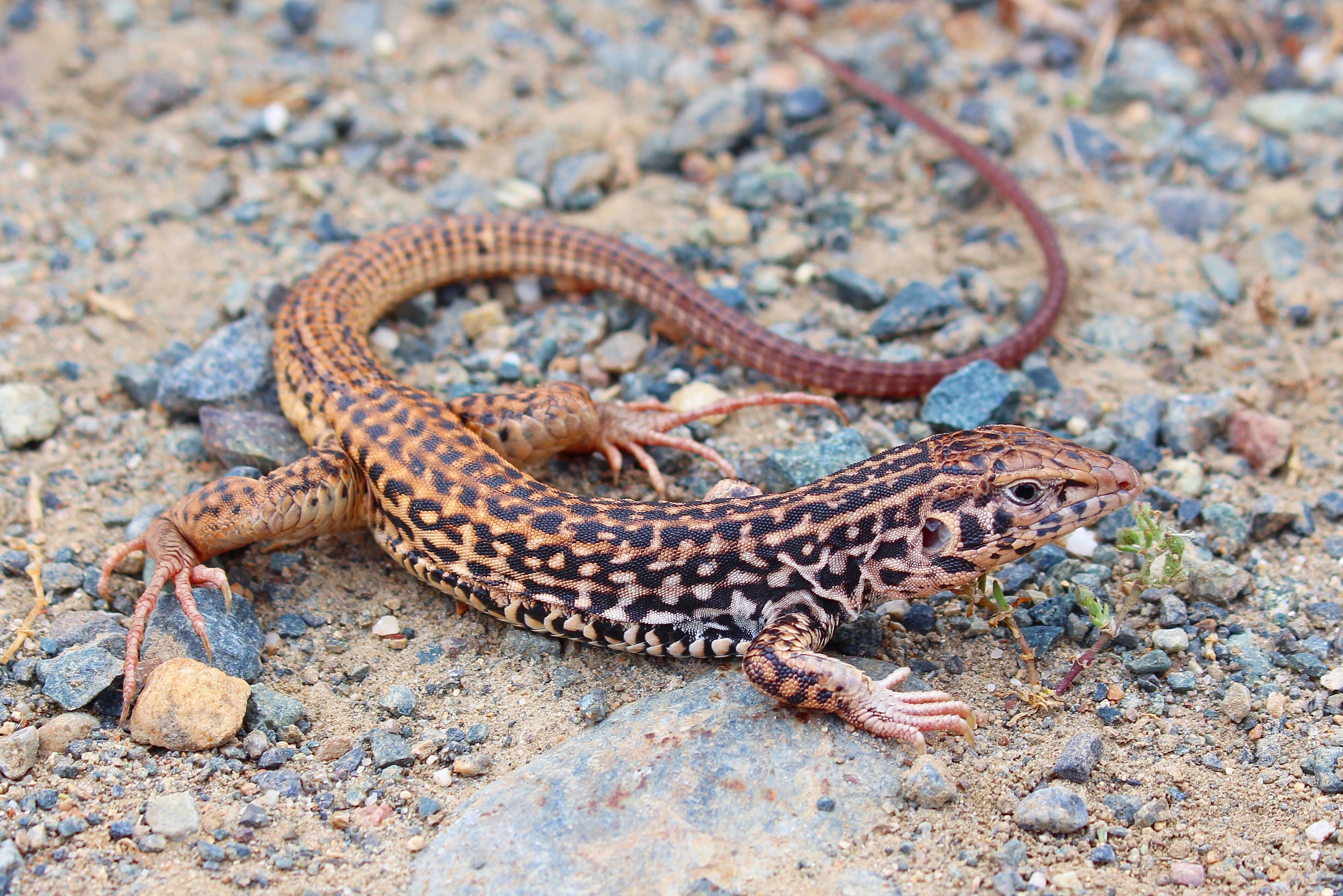
- California whiptail (Aspidoscelis tigris munda)

Scientific classification
- Kingdom: Animalia
- Phylum: Chordata
- Class: Reptilia
- Order: Squamata
- Family: Teiidae
- Genus: Aspidoscelis; Fitzinger, 1843

Species
- Over 40, see text.

= Aspidoscelis =

Genus of lizards

Aspidoscelis is a genus of whiptail lizards in the family Teiidae.

== Taxonomy ==
The nomenclature for the genus Aspidoscelis was published by T.W. Reeder et al. in 2002. Many species that were formerly included in the genus Cnemidophorus are now considered Aspidoscelis based upon divergent characters between the two groups.

== Etymology ==
The name Aspidoscelis literally means "shield-leg", from the Ancient Greek aspido- ("shield") and skelos ("leg").

== Species ==
The following species are recognized as being valid.

- Aspidoscelis angusticeps (Cope, 1878) – Yucatán whiptail
- Aspidoscelis arizonae (Van Denburgh, 1896) – Arizona striped whiptail
- Aspidoscelis burti (E.H. Taylor, 1938) – canyon spotted whiptail
- Aspidoscelis calidipes (Duellman, 1955) – Tepalcatepec Valley whiptail
- Aspidoscelis carmenensis (Maslin & Secoy, 1986) – Carmen Island whiptail
- Aspidoscelis ceralbensis (Van Denburgh & Slevin, 1921) – Cerralvo Island whiptail
- Aspidoscelis communis (Cope, 1878) – Colima giant whiptail
- Aspidoscelis costatus (Cope, 1878) – western Mexico whiptail lizard
- Aspidoscelis cozumela (Gadow, 1906) – Cozumel racerunner
- Aspidoscelis danheimae (Burt, 1929) – Isla San José whiptail
- Aspidoscelis deppii (Wiegmann, 1834) – blackbelly racerunner
- Aspidoscelis dixoni (Scudday, 1973) – gray checkered whiptail
- Aspidoscelis espiritensis (Van Denburgh & Slevin, 1921) – Espiritu Santo whiptail
- Aspidoscelis exsanguis (Lowe, 1956) – Chihuahuan spotted whiptail
- Aspidoscelis franciscensis (Van Denburgh & Slevin, 1921) – San Francisco Island whiptail
- Aspidoscelis gularis (Baird & Girard, 1852) – Texas spotted whiptail
- Aspidoscelis guttatus (Wiegmann, 1834) – Mexican racerunner
- Aspidoscelis hyperythrus (Cope, 1864) – orange-throated whiptail
- Aspidoscelis inornatus (Baird, 1859) – little striped whiptail
- Aspidoscelis labialis (Stejneger, 1890) – Baja California whiptail
- Aspidoscelis laredoensis (McKinney, Kay & R. Anderson, 1973) – Laredo striped whiptail
- Aspidoscelis lineattissimus (Cope, 1878) – many-lined whiptail
- Aspidoscelis marmoratus (Baird & Girard, 1852) – marbled whiptail
- Aspidoscelis martyris (Stejneger, 1891) – San Pedro Martir whiptail
- Aspidoscelis maslini (Fritts, 1969) – Maslin's whiptail
- Aspidoscelis maximus (Cope, 1864) – Cape Region whiptail
- Aspidoscelis mexicanus (W. Peters, 1869) – Mexican whiptail
- Aspidoscelis motaguae (Sackett, 1941) – giant whiptail
- Aspidoscelis neomexicanus (Lowe & Zweifel, 1952) – New Mexico whiptail
- Aspidoscelis neotesselatus (Walker, Cordes & H.L. Taylor, 1997) – Colorado checkered whiptail, triploid checkered whiptail
- Aspidoscelis opatae (Wright, 1967) – Opata whiptail
- Aspidoscelis pai (Wright & Lowe, 1993) – Pai striped whiptail
- Aspidoscelis parvisocius (Zweifel, 1960) – Mexican pigmy whiptail
- Aspidoscelis pictus (Van Denburgh & Slevin, 1921) – Isla Monserrate whiptail
- Aspidoscelis preopatae Barley, Reeder, Nieto-Montes de Oca, Cole & Thomson, 2021
- Aspidoscelis rodecki (C.J. McCoy & Maslin, 1962) – Rodeck's whiptail
- Aspidoscelis sackii (Wiegmann, 1834) – Sack's spotted whiptail
- Aspidoscelis scalaris (Cope, 1892) – rusty-rumped whiptail
- Aspidoscelis septemvittatus (Cope, 1892) – plateau spotted whiptail
- Aspidoscelis sexlineatus (Linnaeus, 1766) – six-lined racerunner
- Aspidoscelis sonorae (Lowe & Wright, 1964) – Sonoran spotted whiptail
- Aspidoscelis stictogrammus (Burger, 1950) – giant spotted whiptail
- Aspidoscelis tesselatus (Say, 1823) – common checkered whiptail
- Aspidoscelis tigris (Baird & Girard, 1852) – western whiptail
- Aspidoscelis uniparens (Wright & Lowe, 1965) – desert grassland whiptail lizard
- Aspidoscelis velox (Springer, 1928) – plateau striped whiptail
- Aspidoscelis xanthonotus (Duellman & Lowe, 1953) – red-backed whiptail

Nota bene: A binomial authority in parentheses indicates that the species was originally described in a genus other than Aspidoscelis.

== Speciation ==
In 2011, it was announced that a parthenogenetic hybrid Aspidocelis was bred in the laboratory. This serves as a demonstration of how other hybrid parthenogens in this genus may have arisen.

== Parthenogenesis and unisexual species ==
Thirteen species within Aspidoscelis are unisexual, consisting entirely of females that reproduce through parthenogenesis—cloning unfertilized eggs to produce genetically identical offspring (Desert Grassland Whiptail (A. uniparens), New Mexico whiptail (A. neomexicanus), Plateau Striped Whiptail (A. velox), Chihuahuan Spotted Whiptail (A. exsanguis), Sonoran Spotted Whiptail (A. sonorae), Common Checkered Whiptail (A. tesselatus), Colorado Checkered Whiptail (A. neotesselata), Texas Spotted Whiptail (A. laredoensis), Gilded Whiptail (A. xanthonotus), A. cozumela, A. maslini, A. rodecki, A. dixoni, and A. reticulosa). These species originated through hybridization between divergent bisexual ancestral species, with the transition to asexual reproduction occurring in a single generation. This represents the largest group of unisexual vertebrate species known to science.

The unisexual species exhibit varying chromosome numbers reflecting their hybrid origins. Diploid species formed through "primary hybrid speciation" when first-generation female hybrids of two distinct bisexual species began reproducing parthenogenetically. Triploid and tetraploid species arose through "genome addition," when cloned eggs of unisexual females were fertilized by males of bisexual species, resulting in offspring with additional chromosome sets.

This hybridization seems separated by 15–25 million years of evolution. The parental species combinations have been determined through karyotypic, allozyme, and mitochondrial DNA studies. Early chromosome studies in the 1960s first revealed abnormal chromosome numbers in some unisexual species, indicating genome combinations from divergent species through hybridization.

The unisexual species occur in two main geographic regions: the southwestern United States and northern Mexico, and southern Mexico with eastern Guatemala and Belize. Recent cellular research has revealed that chromosome number and genetic diversity are maintained across generations because identical, duplicated chromosomes pair during meiosis rather than homologous chromosomes.

Examination of the evolutionary relationships of Aspidoscelis revealed that much hybridization and resultant introgression occurs between sexual species, but hybridization between two taxa with a patristic distance greater than 1% results in the creation of parthenogenetic offspring. This finding supports the balance hypothesis (that a "sweet spot" of divergence is needed for two distinct species to create parthenogenetic lineages– too little divergence results in introgression, and too much results in offspring infertility or inviability).
