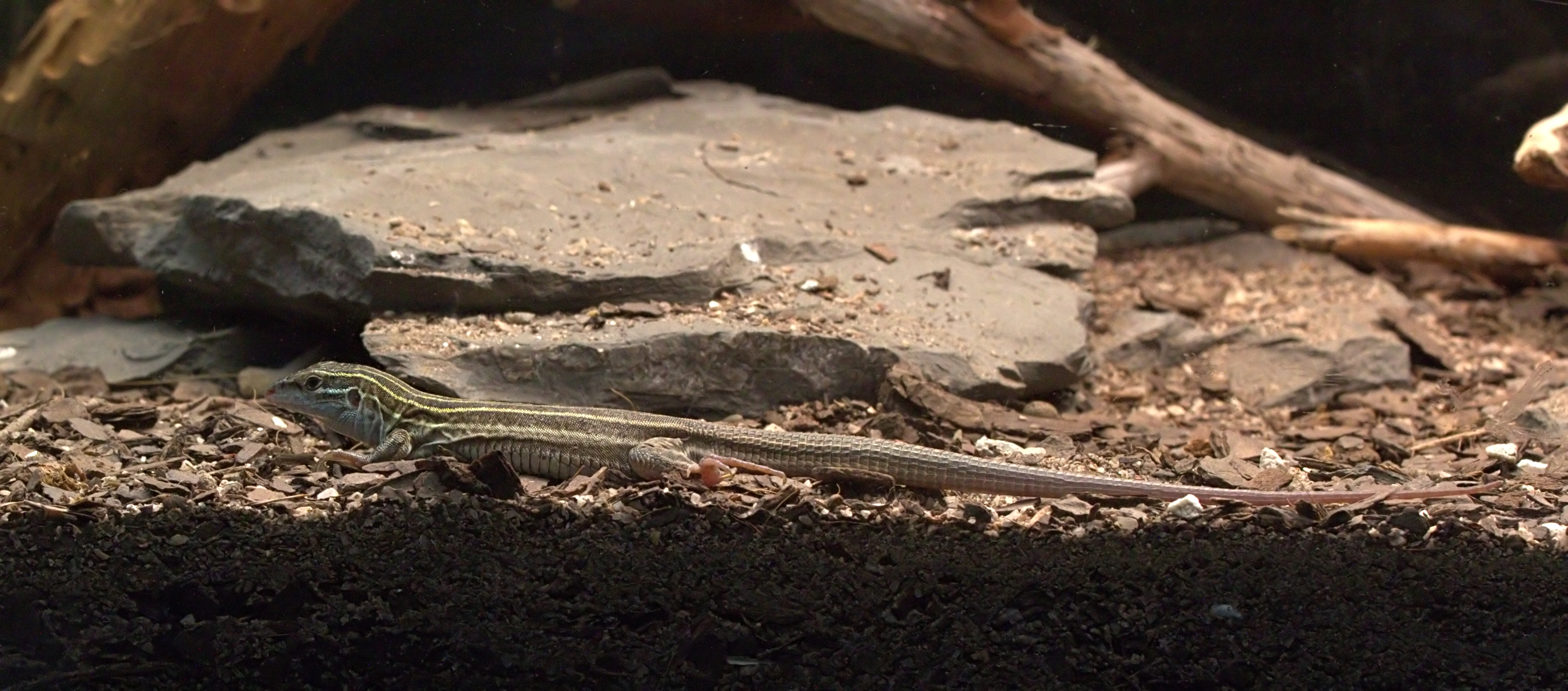

Conservation status
- Least Concern (IUCN 3.1)

Scientific classification
- Kingdom: Animalia
- Phylum: Chordata
- Class: Reptilia
- Order: Squamata
- Suborder: Lacertoidea
- Family: Teiidae
- Genus: Aspidoscelis
- Species: A. uniparens

Binomial name
- Aspidoscelis uniparens (Wright & Lowe, 1965)

Synonyms
- Cnemidophorus uniparens Wright & Lowe, 1965

= Desert grassland whiptail lizard =

Species of lizard

The desert grassland whiptail lizard (Aspidoscelis uniparens) is an all-female species of reptiles in North America. It was formerly placed in the genus Cnemidophorus. A common predator of the whiptail lizard is the leopard lizard that preys on A. uniparens by using ambush and stalk hunting tactics. These reptiles reproduce by parthenogenesis. In this process, eggs undergo a chromosome doubling after meiosis, developing into lizards without being fertilized. However, ovulation is enhanced by female-female courtship and mating (pseudo-copulation) rituals that resemble the behavior of closely related species that reproduce sexually.

== Description ==
The desert grassland whiptail lizard is a relatively small reptile, whose size ranges from 2 3/4 to 5 1/4 inches (7.0 to 13.3 cm). Desert grassland whiptails are very long and slim, with a thin tail that is longer than their body length. Their distinct identifying feature are the six yellowish lines that run the length of their body. The majority of the whiptail's body tends to be an olive or brown colour that fades to a faint blue or gray on their tail. Comparatively, an adolescent's tail is a very bright and vibrant blue. Their bodies are lined with small coarse scales, which gradually get larger as they approach the tail. The scales on their bellies are much larger in size and are much smoother as well.

== Taxonomy ==
The taxonomy of the genus was unknown until the 1950s to early '60's. A 1958 report confirmed that no male lizards had been discovered in a collection of specimens of C. tesselatus. That very year, parthenogenesis was confirmed in the genus Lacerta of the family Lacertidae. Soon after, researchers discovered that there were also no males in C. exsanguis, C. neomexicanus, or C. velox. Rather than subsume all cnemidophorine species into a single large genus, Lowe and Wright proposed a split that placed the North American "Cnemidophorus" clade in the monophyletic genus Aspidoscelis. Under this arrangement, South American taxa remain in the genus Cnemidophorus.

== Habitat ==
The desert grassland whiptail is mostly found in the deserts of southern to central Arizona and along the Rio Grande river in New Mexico. It is also found in the deserts of northern Mexico. A. uniparens is commonly found in low valleys, grasslands, and slight slopes. Some have argued that the species' range is expanding due to overgrazing. A. uniparens are scarce in developed areas, especially where homeowners keep livestock.

== Hybridization and reproduction ==
All desert grassland whiptail lizards are female. Their reproduction process does not need male fertilization, although researchers observed pseudo-copulation that promotes fertilization during ovulation. This process involves the alternation between male-typical and female-typical sexual behaviours, driven by progesterone, in both lizards; corresponding to the state of their partner. The lizards reproduce by parthenogenesis and are clones of their mother. Under normal reproductive processes, a species has each chromosome pair separated, copied, and paired back with its counterpart. The desert grassland whiptail lizard, however, has chromosome triplets where each triplet is paired with its copy rather than its counterparts. This reproductive method enables the asexual desert grassland whiptail lizard to have a genetic diversity previously thought to have been unique to sexually reproductive species.

The lizards were a result from a cross breed of two bisexual species, A. inornata and A. burti. This then produced a diploid unisexual, which backcrossed to inornata and produced triploid uniparens.

== Food habits ==
For the most part, the Desert grassland whiptail digs for termites, Queen ants, beetles, and unidentified insects. A smaller portion of their diet includes prey found above ground such as grasshoppers and butterflies.
