= Red-backed whiptail =

Conservation status
- Near Threatened (IUCN 3.1)

Scientific classification
- Kingdom: Animalia
- Phylum: Chordata
- Class: Reptilia
- Order: Squamata
- Suborder: Lacertoidea
- Family: Teiidae
- Genus: Aspidoscelis
- Species: A. xanthonota

Binomial name
- Aspidoscelis xanthonota (Duellman & Lowe, 1953)

Species of lizard

The red-backed whiptail (Aspidoscelis xanthonota) is a species of teiid lizard found in Arizona in the United States and Sonora in Mexico.

== Description ==
Its color varies between red to brown.
