= Aspidoscelis maslini =

Conservation status
- Least Concern (IUCN 3.1)

Scientific classification
- Kingdom: Animalia
- Phylum: Chordata
- Class: Reptilia
- Order: Squamata
- Family: Teiidae
- Genus: Aspidoscelis
- Species: A. maslini

Binomial name
- Aspidoscelis maslini (Fritts, 1969)

Synonyms
- Cnemidophorus cozumela maslini Fritts, 1969; Cnemidophorus maslini Fritts, 1969; Aspidoscelis cozumela maslini (Fritts, 1969)

Species of lizard

Aspidoscelis maslini, also known commonly as Maslin's whiptail, Maslin's racerunner, and el huico de Maslin in New World Spanish, is a species of lizard in the family Teiidae. The species is endemic to the Yucatán Peninsula.

== Etymology ==
The specific name, maslini, is in honor of American herpetologist T. Paul Maslin.

== Geographic distribution ==
Aspidoscelis maslini is native to Mexico (Campeche, Quintana Roo), Guatemala (Petén), and Belize.

== Habitat ==
Aspidoscelis maslini has been found in a variety of disturbed habitats, at altitudes from sea level to 200 m (660 ft), including beaches, coconut plantations, and roadsides.

== Reproduction ==
Aspidoscelis maslini is oviparous and parthenogenetic.

== Taxonomy ==
Aspidoscelis maslini is a member of the Aspidoscelis cozumela species group.
