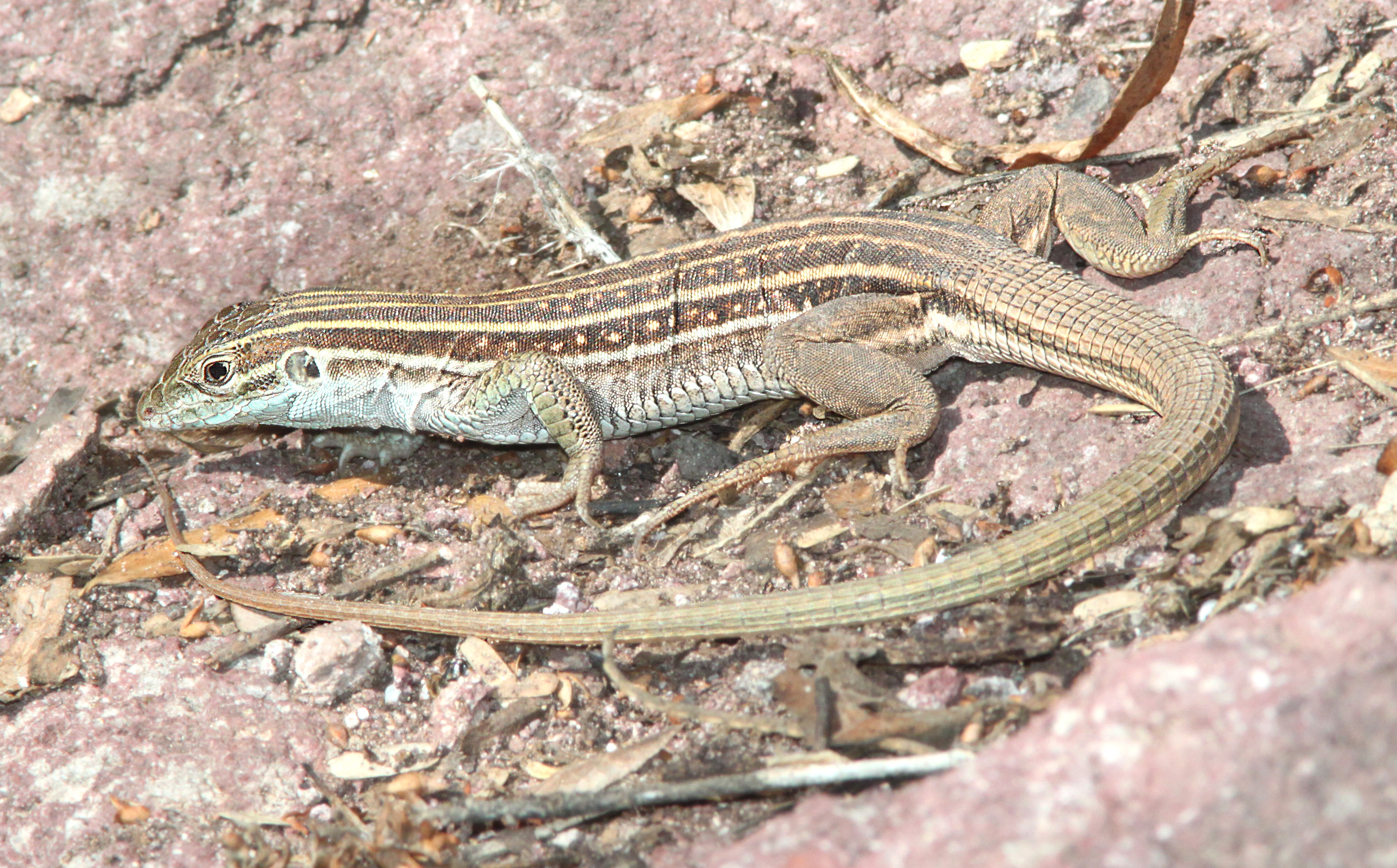

Conservation status
- Least Concern (IUCN 3.1)

Scientific classification
- Kingdom: Animalia
- Phylum: Chordata
- Class: Reptilia
- Order: Squamata
- Suborder: Lacertoidea
- Family: Teiidae
- Genus: Aspidoscelis
- Species: A. sonorae

Binomial name
- Aspidoscelis sonorae (Lowe & Wright, 1964)

= Sonoran spotted whiptail =

Species of lizard

The Sonoran spotted whiptail (Aspidoscelis sonorae) is a parthenogenic species of teiid lizard found in Arizona and New Mexico in the United States, and Mexico.
