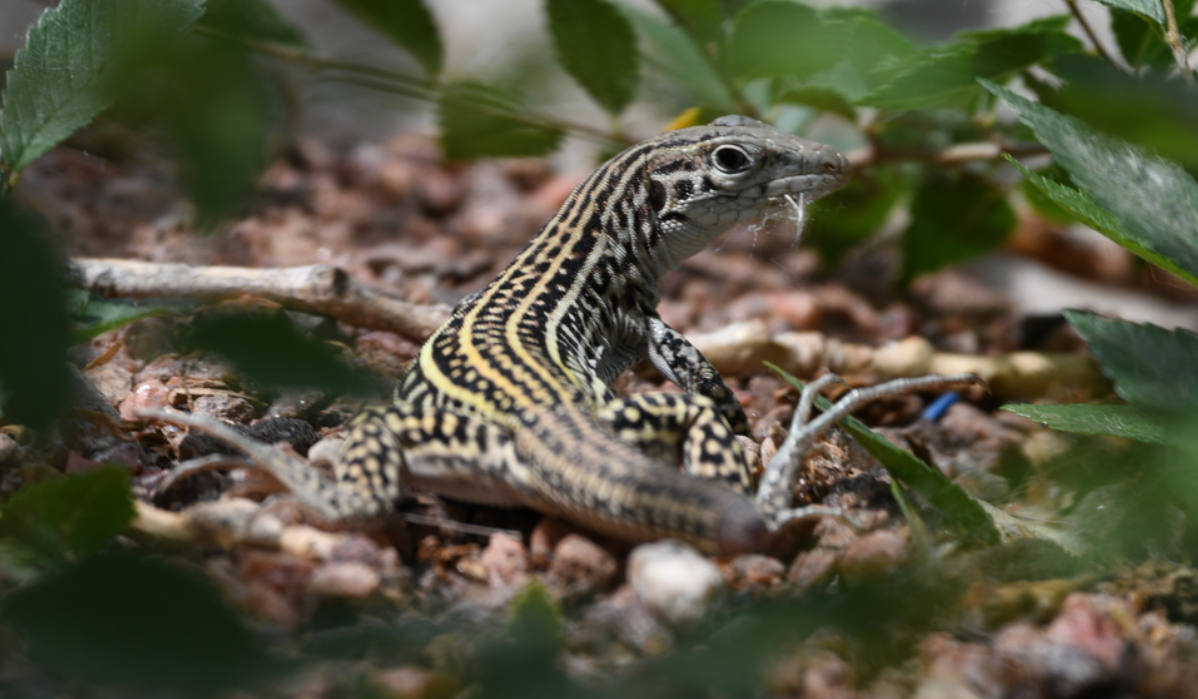

Conservation status
- Near Threatened (IUCN 3.1)

Scientific classification
- Kingdom: Animalia
- Phylum: Chordata
- Class: Reptilia
- Order: Squamata
- Family: Teiidae
- Genus: Aspidoscelis
- Species: A. neotesselatus

Binomial name
- Aspidoscelis neotesselatus (Walker, Cordes, & H.L. Taylor, 1997)

= Colorado checkered whiptail =

Species of lizard

The Colorado checkered whiptail or triploid checkered whiptail (Aspidoscelis neotesselatus) is a species of teiid lizard found in Colorado in the United States. This species of whiptail lizard is entirely female and reproduces asexually through a process known as parthenogenesis. It is incredible hard to distinguish common vs Colorado checkered whiptail.

== Description ==
This species of lizard can be nearly impossible to discern from the common checkered whiptail (Aspidoscelis tesselatus), which can be found in a similar range as the Colorado Checkered whiptail. They average a length of 4.2 inches snout to vent, with a tail generally longer than the body. They have granular scales with a light colored body and dark checkering, lines, and bars.Hatchlings and young have brighter colors, with a bright blue tail and yellow body.

== Distribution and Habitat ==
As the name suggests these lizards are endemic to Southeastern Colorado. Often found in or around Juniper bushes, canyons, under trees and shrubs, or basking on a rock. They tend to avoid being out in the open. The Colorado Checkered Whiptail can only be found near and in the Arkansas river drainage located in SE Colorado.

== Physiology ==
=== Parthenogenesis ===
Parthenogenesis is common among species in the Teiidae family. In this species they posses three chromosome sets rather than two; they are often therefore called triploid checkered whiptails. The offspring are genetically identical to the mother and all are female.

=== Defense ===
The main defense of these lizards is to flee. They are incredibly fast and agile. They can also drop their tail if caught or grabbed.

=== Hybridization ===
This species originated through 2-step hybridization. It originated as a hybrid between the diploid unisexual common checkered whiptail and the six lined racerunner which is diploid sexual. This hybridization caused a third pair of chromosomes, triploidy.

== Etymology ==
Aspidoscelis can be translated to 'shield-leg' in reference to the large scales around the thighs and legs of this genus. aspido-(greek) meaning shield, skelos-(greek) meaning leg. neotesselatus can be translated to 'new mosaic' or 'new checkered'. Neo- (latin) meaning new, tesselatus- (latin) meaning mosaic or checkered. The reason are call called 'new' is because they were originally thought to belong to tesselatus before being confirmed a different species.
