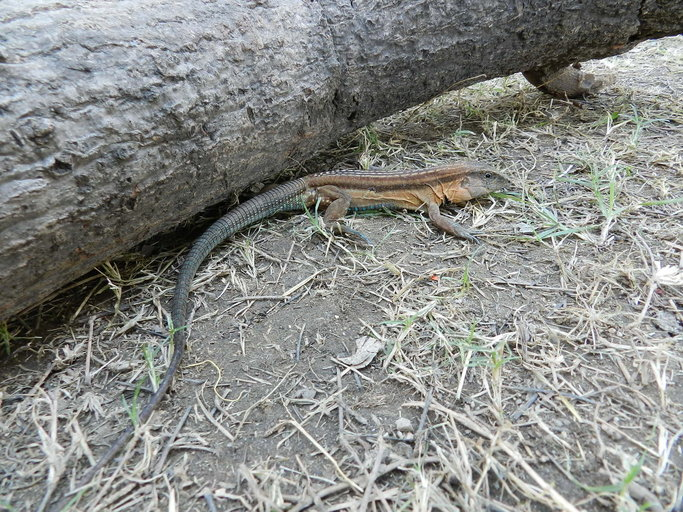

Conservation status
- Least Concern (IUCN 3.1)

Scientific classification
- Domain: Eukaryota
- Kingdom: Animalia
- Phylum: Chordata
- Class: Reptilia
- Order: Squamata
- Family: Teiidae
- Genus: Aspidoscelis
- Species: A. guttatus

Binomial name
- Aspidoscelis guttatus (Wiegmann, 1834)

= Aspidoscelis guttatus =

Species of lizard

Aspidoscelis guttatus, the Mexican racerunner, is a species of teiid lizard endemic to Mexico.
