= San Pedro Martir whiptail =

Conservation status
- Vulnerable (IUCN 3.1)

Scientific classification
- Kingdom: Animalia
- Phylum: Chordata
- Class: Reptilia
- Order: Squamata
- Suborder: Lacertoidea
- Family: Teiidae
- Genus: Aspidoscelis
- Species: A. martyris

Binomial name
- Aspidoscelis martyris (Stejneger, 1891)

Species of lizard

The San Pedro Martir whiptail (Aspidoscelis martyris) is a species of teiid lizard endemic to San Pedro Mártir Island in Mexico.
