= Aspidoscelis danheimae =

Conservation status
- Least Concern (IUCN 3.1)

Scientific classification
- Kingdom: Animalia
- Phylum: Chordata
- Class: Reptilia
- Order: Squamata
- Family: Teiidae
- Genus: Aspidoscelis
- Species: A. danheimae

Binomial name
- Aspidoscelis danheimae (Burt, 1929)

Synonyms
- Verticaria sericea Van Denburgh, 1895; Cnemidophorus hyperythrus danheimae Burt, 1929 (nomen novum); Cnemidophorus danheimae — Grismer, 1999; Aspidoscelis danheimae — Reeder, Cole & Dessauer, 2002

Species of lizard

Aspidoscelis danheimae, also known commonly as the Isla San José whiptail, the San Jose Island blue-throated whiptail, and el huico de la Isla San José in Mexican Spanish, is a species of lizard in the family Teiidae. The species is endemic to Isla San José in Baja California Sur, Mexico.

== Etymology ==
The specific name, danheimae (genitive, feminine), is in honor of American herpetologist May Danheim Burt, the wife of the describer.

== Habitat ==
The preferred natural habitats of Aspidoscelis danheimae are shrubland, rocky areas, and sandy areas, including beach.

== Reproduction ==
Aspidoscelis danheimae is oviparous.
