= Mexican whiptail =

Conservation status
- Least Concern (IUCN 3.1)

Scientific classification
- Domain: Eukaryota
- Kingdom: Animalia
- Phylum: Chordata
- Class: Reptilia
- Order: Squamata
- Family: Teiidae
- Genus: Aspidoscelis
- Species: A. mexicanus

Binomial name
- Aspidoscelis mexicanus (Peters, 1869)

Species of lizard

The Mexican whiptail (Aspidoscelis mexicanus) is a species of teiid lizard endemic to Mexico.
