= Aspidoscelis opatae =

Conservation status
- Data Deficient (IUCN 3.1)

Scientific classification
- Kingdom: Animalia
- Phylum: Chordata
- Class: Reptilia
- Order: Squamata
- Suborder: Lacertoidea
- Family: Teiidae
- Genus: Aspidoscelis
- Species: A. opatae

Binomial name
- Aspidoscelis opatae (Wright, 1969)

Species of lizard

Aspidoscelis opatae, the Opata whiptail, is a species of teiid lizard endemic to Mexico.
