= San Pedro Mártir Island =

Island in Sonora, Mexico

San Pedro Mártir
Native name: Spanish: Isla San Pedro Mártir
- Location within Mexico

Geography
- Location: Gulf of California
- Coordinates: 28°22′49″N 112°18′25″W
- Area: 2.72 km^{2} (1.05 sq mi)

Administration
- Mexico
- State: Sonora

Demographics
- Population: uninhabited

Ramsar Wetland
- Official name: Isla San Pedro Mártir
- Designated: 2 February 2004
- Reference no.: 1359

San Pedro Mártir is the name of an island of Mexico, located in the Gulf of California, about halfway between the coast of Baja California and Sonora. San Pedro Mártir is located in the center of the Gulf of California and is the most remote island in the Sea of Cortez. It is located 51 km from Baja California and 53 km off the coast of Sonora. The island is 2 km long and 1.5 km maximum width, with a total of 2.729 km^{2} of total area (272 hectares). The island is uninhabited by humans and is 60 km from Bahía Kino, the nearest city in the state of Sonora on the west coast.

The island and its marine life are, since 2002, part of the San Pedro Martir Biosphere Reserve, and is regarded as a natural laboratory of adaptive evolution, similar to that of the Galápagos Islands. It is home to 292 species of fauna and flora (both land-based and aquatic), with 42 species protected by Mexican law, and 30 listed on the Red List of Threatened Species. San Pedro Martir is also unique in the area for its year-round quantity of birds. The island is the only island in the area with a perpetually swirling cloud of seabirds. This is because the water around the island, has some of the most successful marine productivity in the world, resulting in incredible densities of small-pelagic fish, such as anchovies and sardines, in comparison to other regions of the world. This attracts both seabirds and whales to its waters. Isla Rasa and San Pedro are regarded as the most significant bird sanctuaries in the Sea of Cortes.

The large bird population deposits enormous quantities of guano on the island, resulting in the white appearance of the island contrasted with sparse vegetation. While the island has 24 species of vascular plants, the flora of the island is dominated by the Mexican giant cardon or elephant cactus that can grow to 60 feet, and is especially suited to the lack of rainfall. A subspecies of bee (Diadasia rinconis petrinus), is the primary pollinator of the cacti. San Pedro Mártir Island houses the largest nesting colonies of the brown boobies (Sula leucogaster) and blue-footed boobies (Sula nebouxii) in the world. This, in turn, has fed the success of the two endemic lizard species on the island, San Pedro Martir whiptail (Aspidoscelis martyris) and the San Pedro Side-blotched Lizard (Uta palmeri), who feed off of fish scraps leftover by the birds. Sea lion (Zalophus californianus) rockeries also ring the island, housing the fourth most important colony for sea lion breeding in the Gulf of California.

The Seri Indians created benches to attract nest building and ease of egg collection, the sole permanent evidence of human intervention visible on the island. In the late 19th and early 20th century guano was heavily mined off the island and shipped as far as Europe for use as fertilizer. Mining boats brought the black rat as an invasive species to the island. The rats were eradicated in the fall of 2007 by spraying rat poison on the island.

San Pedro Martir is seldom visited, having near vertical sides leaving only questionable fair weather anchorages in two locations. Landing access was possible near a small isthmus in the southeast of the island, but is now forbidden. In 2005, the island was classified along with 244 others as a World Heritage Site by UNESCO, and included in the Islands and Protected Areas of the Gulf of California.

== Flora and fauna ==
According to the National Biodiversity Information System of Comisión Nacional para el Conocimiento y Uso de la Biodiversidad (CONABIO) in San Pedro Mártir Island Biosphere Reserve there are over 330 plant and animal species from which 27 are in at risk category and 7 are exotics.
