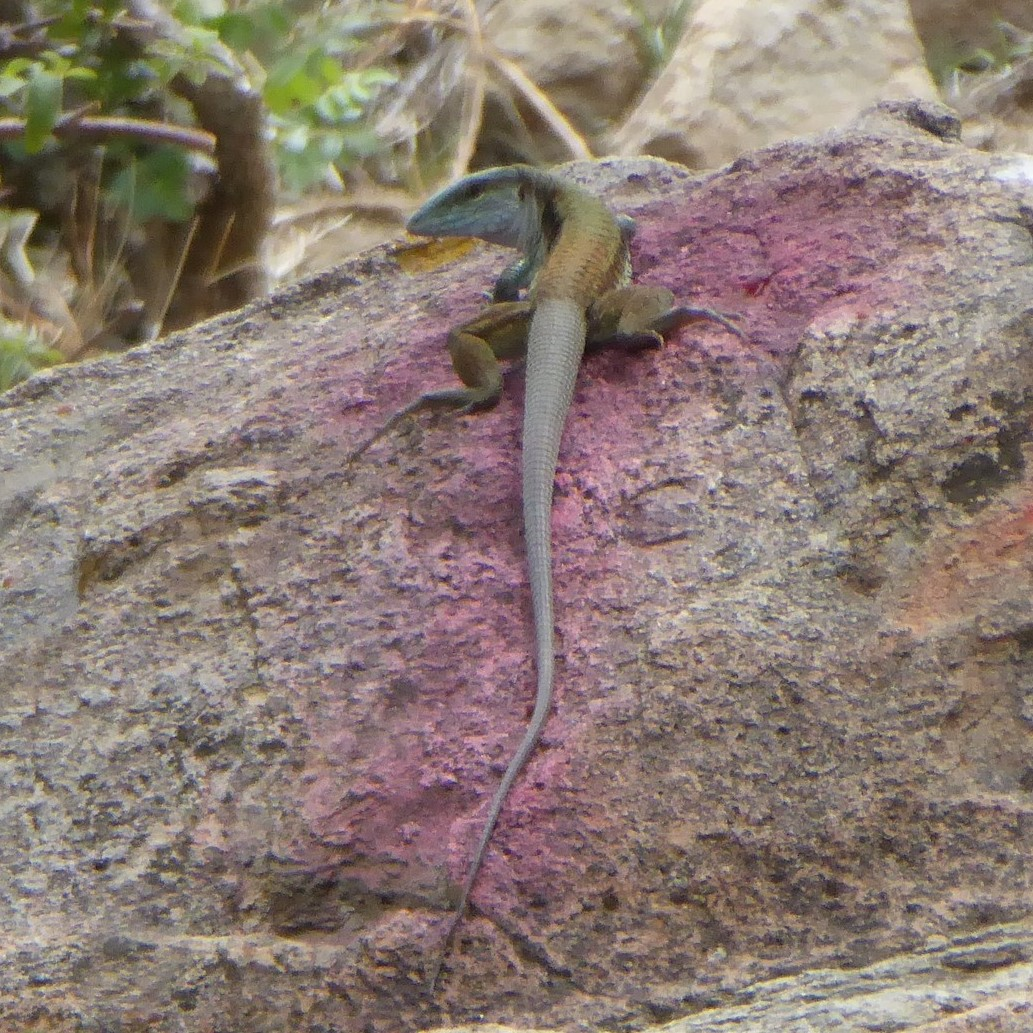

Conservation status
- Least Concern (IUCN 3.1)

Scientific classification
- Kingdom: Animalia
- Phylum: Chordata
- Class: Reptilia
- Order: Squamata
- Family: Teiidae
- Genus: Aspidoscelis
- Species: A. sackii

Binomial name
- Aspidoscelis sackii (Wiegmann, 1834)

Synonyms
- List: Cnemidophorus sackii Wiegmann, 1834; Cnemidophorus sexlineatus sackii — Burt, 1931; Cnemidophorus sackii — H.M. Smith, 1949; Aspidoscelis sackii — Reeder et al., 2002

= Aspidoscelis sackii =

Species of lizard

Aspidoscelis sackii, known commonly as Sack's spotted whiptail, is a species of lizard in the family Teiidae. The species is endemic to Mexico. There are three recognized subspecies.

== Taxonomy ==
The specific name, sackii, is in honor of German explorer Baron Sebastian Albert von Sack.

=== Subspecies ===
Three subspecies are recognized as being valid, including the nominotypical subspecies.

- Aspidoscelis sackii bocourti (Boulenger, 1885)
- Aspidoscelis sackii gigas (Davis & H.M. Smith, 1952)
- Aspidoscelis sackii sackii (Wiegmann, 1834)

Nota bene: A trinomial authority in parentheses indicates that the subspecies was originally described in a genus other than Aspidoscelis.

== Distribution and habitat ==
A. sackii is found in the Mexican states of Chiapas, Guerrero, Mexico City, Michoacán, Morelos, Oaxaca, Puebla, and Tamaulipas.

The preferred natural habitats of A. sackii are forest, shrubland, and desert.

== Reproduction ==
A. sackii is oviparous.
