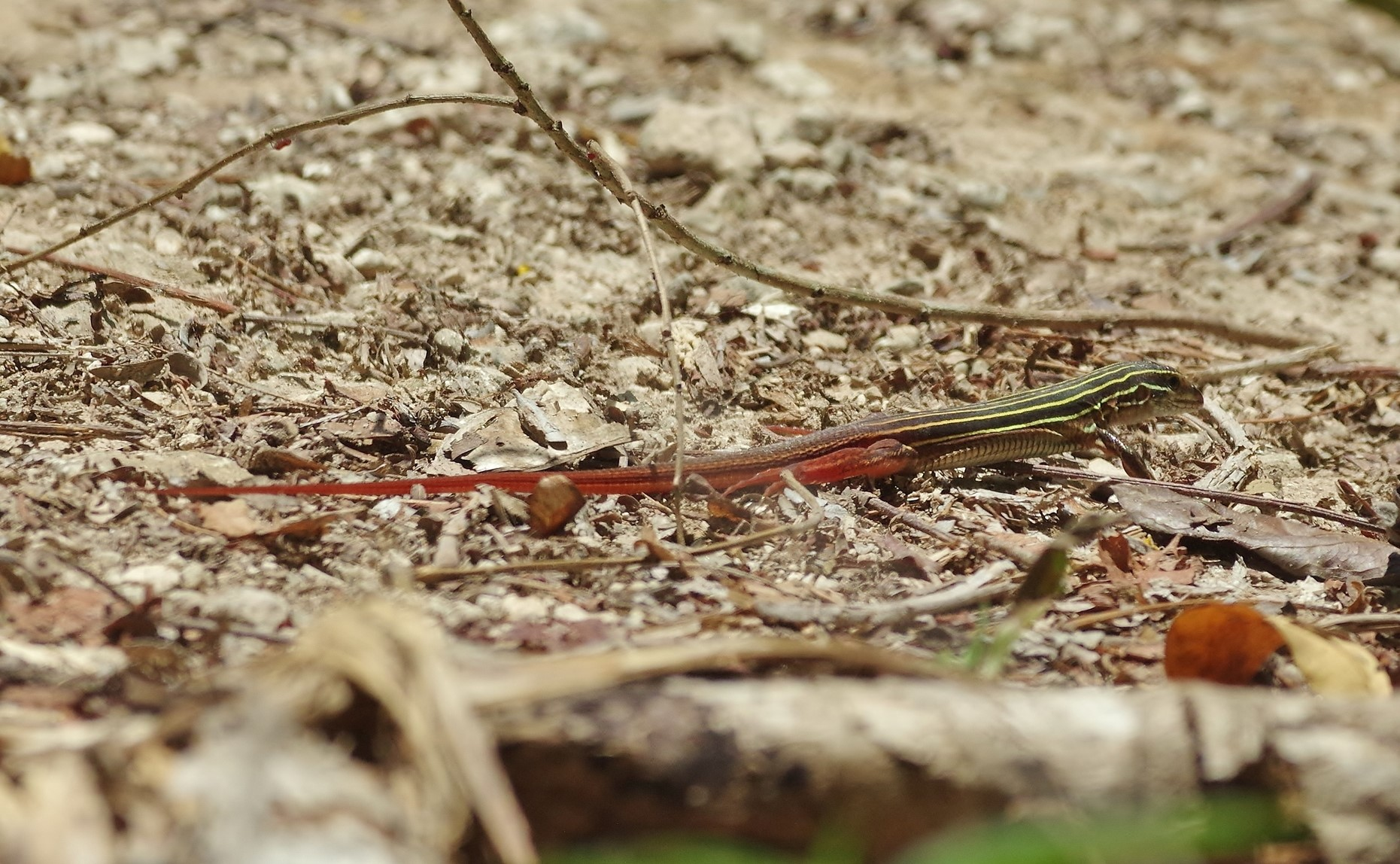

Conservation status
- Least Concern (IUCN 3.1)

Scientific classification
- Kingdom: Animalia
- Phylum: Chordata
- Class: Reptilia
- Order: Squamata
- Suborder: Lacertoidea
- Family: Teiidae
- Genus: Aspidoscelis
- Species: A. angusticeps

Binomial name
- Aspidoscelis angusticeps (Cope, 1878)

= Aspidoscelis angusticeps =

Species of lizard

Aspidoscelis angusticeps, the Yucatán whiptail, is a species of teiid lizard found in Mexico, Guatemala, and Belize.

Subspecies of Aspidoscelis angusticeps are:

- Aspidoscelis angusticeps petenensis (BEARGIE & MCCOY 1964)
- Aspidoscelis angusticeps angusticeps (COPE 1877)
