= Aspidoscelis carmenensis =

Conservation status
- Least Concern (IUCN 3.1)

Scientific classification
- Kingdom: Animalia
- Phylum: Chordata
- Class: Reptilia
- Order: Squamata
- Suborder: Lacertoidea
- Family: Teiidae
- Genus: Aspidoscelis
- Species: A. carmenensis

Binomial name
- Aspidoscelis carmenensis (Maslin & Secoy, 1986)

Species of lizard

Aspidoscelis carmenensis, the Carmen Island whiptail, is a species of teiid lizard endemic to Carmen Island in Mexico.
