= Aspidoscelis preopatae =

Scientific classification
- Kingdom: Animalia
- Phylum: Chordata
- Class: Reptilia
- Order: Squamata
- Family: Teiidae
- Genus: Aspidoscelis
- Species: A. preopatae

Binomial name
- Aspidoscelis preopatae Barley, Reeder, Nieto-Montes de Oca, Cole, & Thomson, 2021

Species of lizard

Aspidoscelis preopatae is a species of teiid lizard endemic to Sonora in Mexico.
