= Aspidoscelis ceralbensis =

Conservation status
- Least Concern (IUCN 3.1)

Scientific classification
- Kingdom: Animalia
- Phylum: Chordata
- Class: Reptilia
- Order: Squamata
- Suborder: Lacertoidea
- Family: Teiidae
- Genus: Aspidoscelis
- Species: A. ceralbensis

Binomial name
- Aspidoscelis ceralbensis (Van Denburgh & Slevin, 1921)

Species of lizard

Aspidoscelis ceralbensis, the Cerralvo Island whiptail, is a species of teiid lizard endemic to Jacques Cousteau Island in Mexico.
