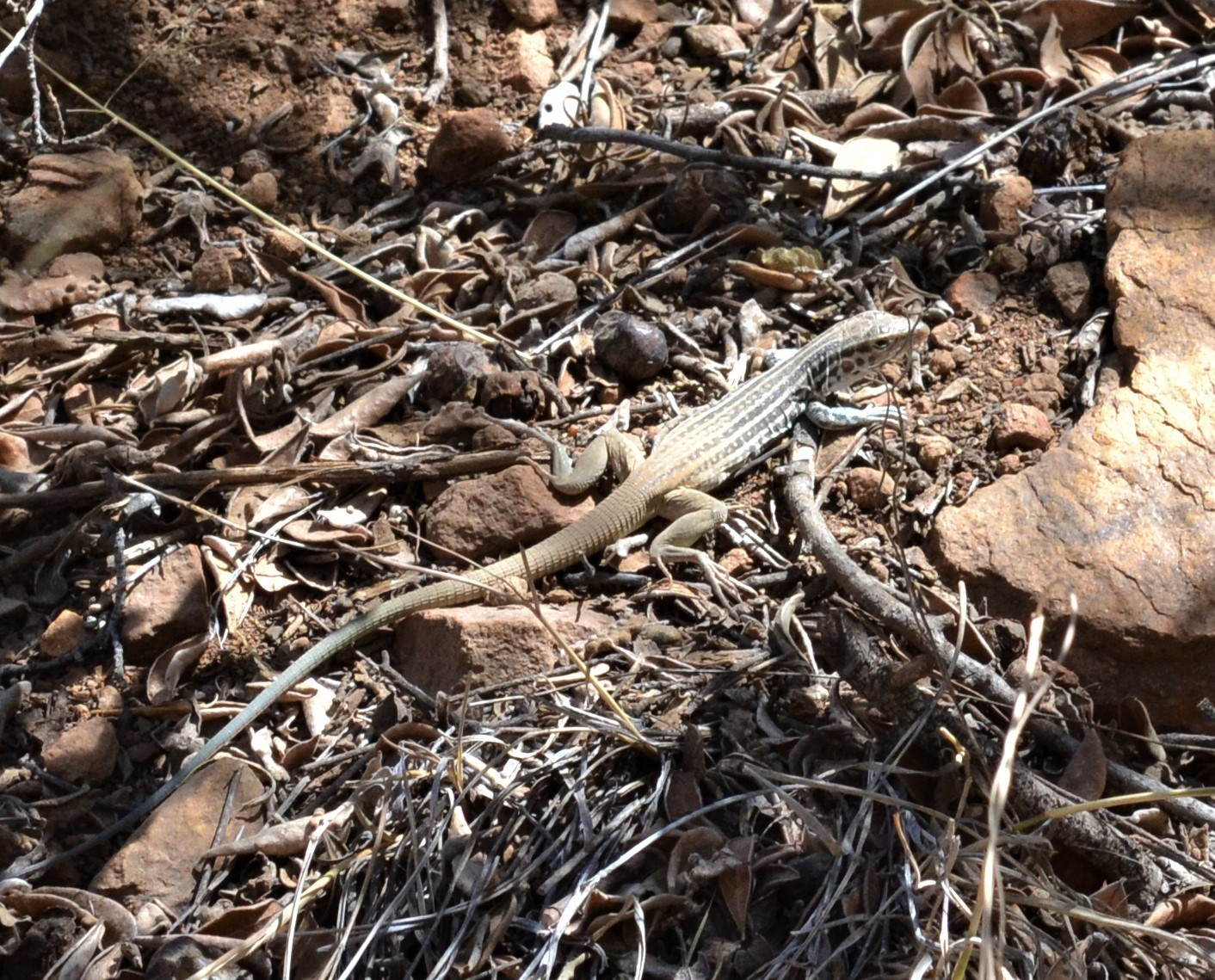

Scientific classification
- Domain: Eukaryota
- Kingdom: Animalia
- Phylum: Chordata
- Class: Reptilia
- Order: Squamata
- Family: Teiidae
- Genus: Aspidoscelis
- Species: A. scalaris

Binomial name
- Aspidoscelis scalaris (Cope, 1892)

= Aspidoscelis scalaris =

Species of lizard

Aspidoscelis scalaris, the rusty-rumped whiptail, is a species of teiid lizard found in Mexico and the United States (Texas).
