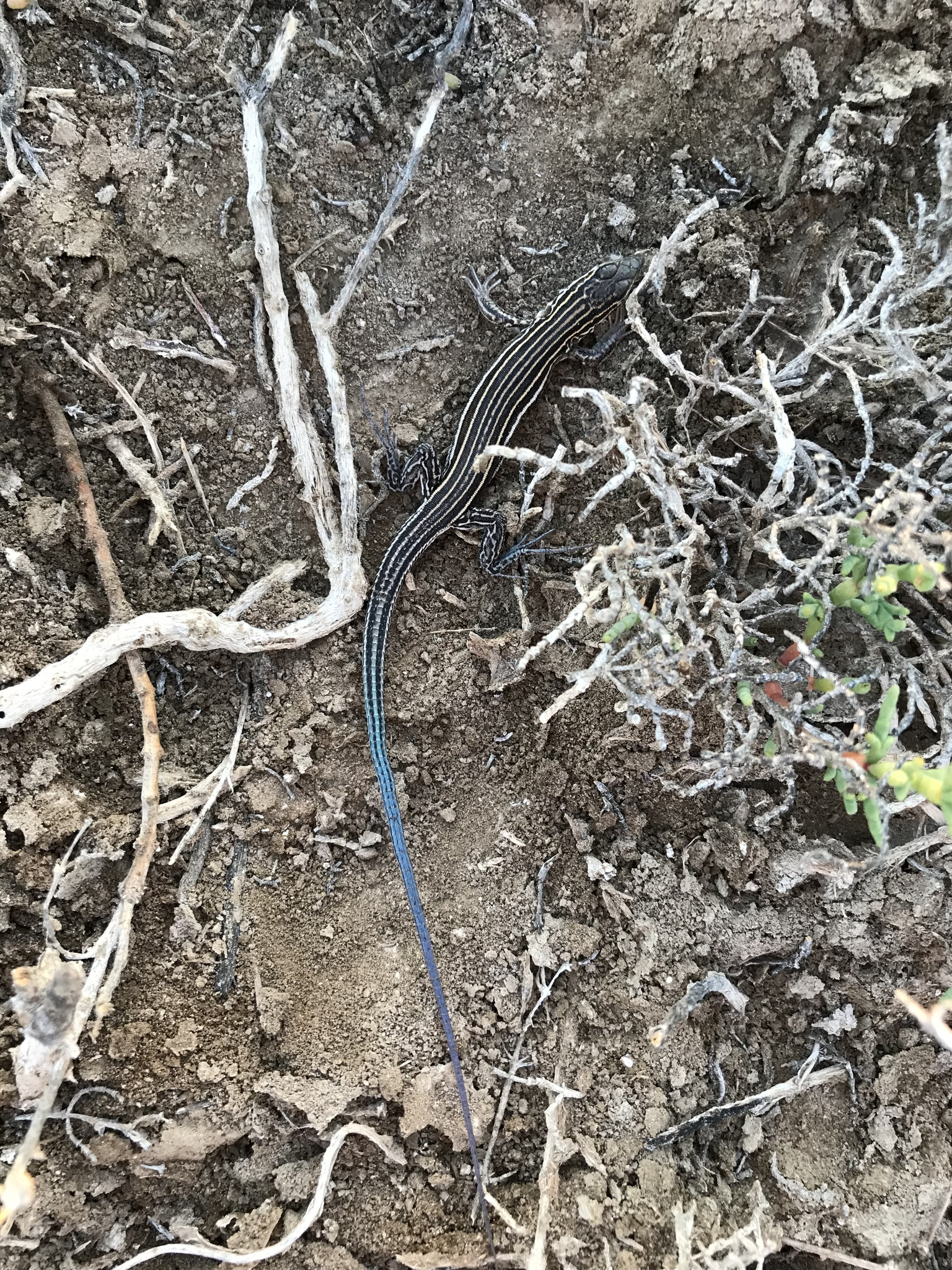

Conservation status
- Vulnerable (IUCN 3.1)

Scientific classification
- Kingdom: Animalia
- Phylum: Chordata
- Class: Reptilia
- Order: Squamata
- Suborder: Lacertoidea
- Family: Teiidae
- Genus: Aspidoscelis
- Species: A. labialis

Binomial name
- Aspidoscelis labialis (Stejneger, 1890)

= Baja California whiptail =

Species of reptile

The Baja California whiptail (Aspidoscelis labialis) is a species of teiid lizard endemic to the Baja California Peninsula in Mexico.
