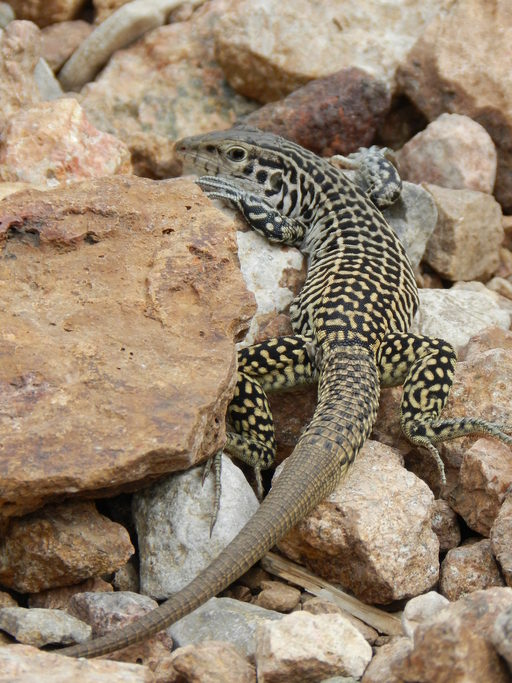

Conservation status
- Least Concern (IUCN 3.1)

Scientific classification
- Kingdom: Animalia
- Phylum: Chordata
- Class: Reptilia
- Order: Squamata
- Family: Teiidae
- Genus: Aspidoscelis
- Species: A. tesselata

Binomial name
- Aspidoscelis tesselata (Say, 1823)

Synonyms
- List: *Ameiva tesselata Say, 1823; Cnemidophorus grahamii Baird & Girard, 1852; Aspidoscelis tesselata Reeder, 2002; Cnemidophorus tesselatus SMitH & BUrGer 1949; Cnemidophorus dixoni Scudday, 1973; Cnemidophorus tesselatus dixoni — Stebbins, 1985; Cnemidophorus dixoni — Wright, 1993; Aspidoscelis dixoni — Reeder, Cole & Dessauer, 2002; Aspidoscelis dixoni — Weidler, 2019

= Common checkered whiptail =

Species of lizard

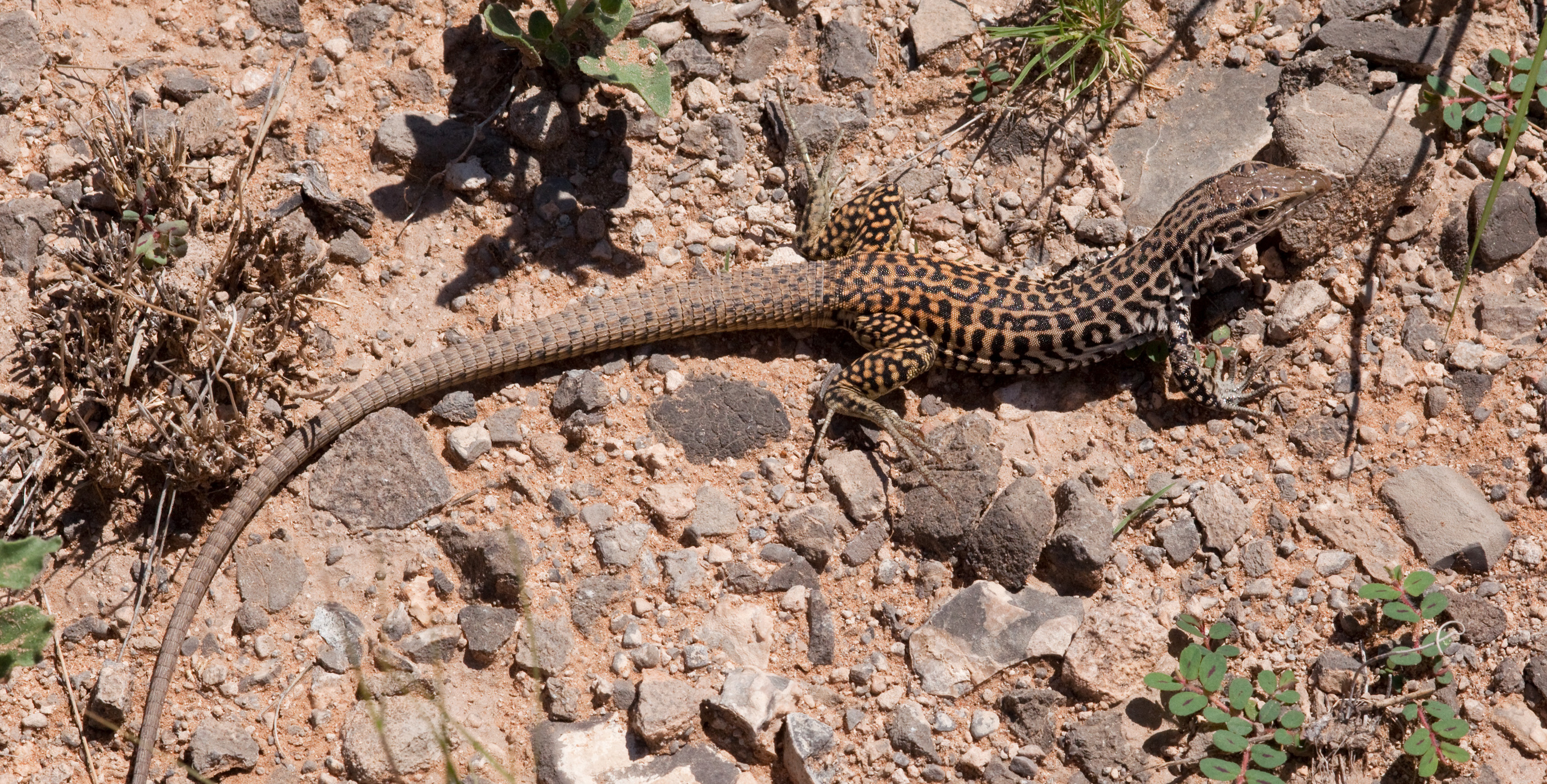
Checkered whiptail (Aspidoscelis tesselata) Sierra County, New Mexico

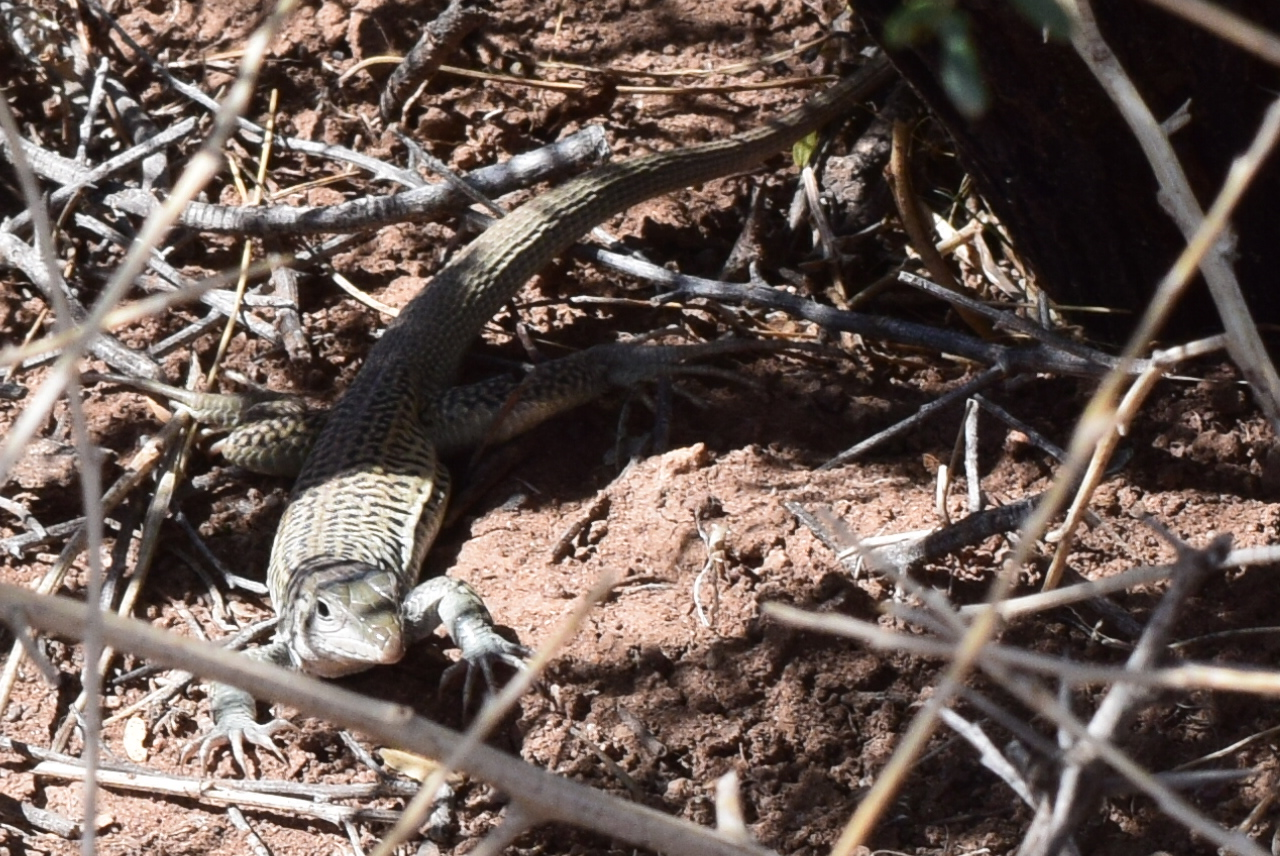
Gray checkered whiptail

The checkered whiptail (Aspidoscelis tesselatus) is a species of lizard found in the southwestern United States in Colorado, Texas and New Mexico, and in northern Mexico in Chihuahua and Coahuila. Many sources believe that the species originated from the hybridization of the marbled whiptail, Aspidoscelis marmoratus, the plateau spotted whiptail, Aspidoscelis septemvittatus, and possibly the six-lined racerunner, Aspidoscelis sexlineatus. It is one of many lizard species known to be parthenogenic. It is sometimes referred to as the common checkered whiptail to differentiate it from several other species known as checkered whiptails.

== Taxonomy ==
The gray checkered whiptail (A. dixoni), once considered a species, is now considered to be a synonym of the common checkered whiptail.

== Etymology ==
The epithet, dixoni, is in homage of renowned American herpetologist James R. Dixon,

== Description ==
The checkered whiptail grows to about 4 inches in length. Their pattern and base coloration varies widely, with brown or black blotching, checkering or striping on a pale yellow or white base color. Their rear legs often have dark spotting, and their underside is usually white with dark flecking on the throat area. They are slender bodied, with a long tail.

The gray checkered whiptail grows to between 20 and 30 centimetres (8 and 12 in) in total length (including tail). It is typically gray in color, with 10–12 white or yellow stripes that go the length of the body, often with spotting or checkering on the stripes. It is thin-bodied, with a long tail.

== Behavior ==
It is one of many lizard species known to be parthenogenetic.

Like other species of whiptail lizard, the checkered whiptail is diurnal and insectivorous. They are wary, energetic, and fast moving, darting for cover if approached. They are found in semi-arid, rocky habitats, normally in canyon lands or hilled regions. They are parthenogenic, laying up to eight unfertilized eggs in mid summer, which hatch in six to eight weeks.

== Genetics ==
The checkered whiptail is a diploid species. Like other unisexual vertebrate organisms, this whiptail originated through a hybridization event between two divergent species– in this case, Aspidoscelis gularis (the paternal ancestor) and Aspidoscelis marmoratus (the maternal ancestor).
