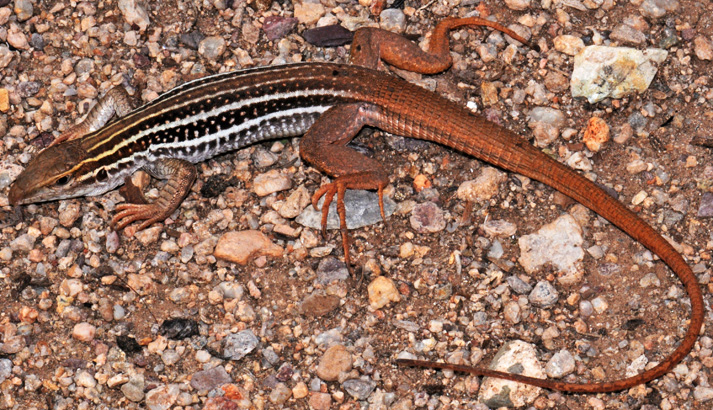

Conservation status
- Least Concern (IUCN 3.1)

Scientific classification
- Kingdom: Animalia
- Phylum: Chordata
- Class: Reptilia
- Order: Squamata
- Family: Teiidae
- Genus: Aspidoscelis
- Species: A. burti

Binomial name
- Aspidoscelis burti (Taylor, 1938)

Synonyms
- Cnemidophorus burti Taylor, 1938; Aspidoscelis burti — Reeder, Cole & Dessauer, 2002

= Canyon spotted whiptail =

Species of lizard

The canyon spotted whiptail (Aspidoscelis burti), also known commonly as el huico manchado de cañón in Mexican Spanish, is a species of lizard in the family Teiidae. The species is native to northwestern Mexico and the adjacent southwestern United States.

== Etymology ==
The specific name, burti, is in honor of American herpetologist Charles Earle Burt.

== Geographic range ==
Aspidoscelis burti is found in the Mexican state of Sonora and in the U.S. state of Arizona.

== Habitat ==
The preferred natural habitats of Aspidoscelis burti are forest, shrubland, and rocky areas.

== Reproduction ==
Aspidoscelis burti is oviparous.
