= Aspidoscelis espiritensis =

Conservation status
- Least Concern (IUCN 3.1)

Scientific classification
- Kingdom: Animalia
- Phylum: Chordata
- Class: Reptilia
- Order: Squamata
- Suborder: Lacertoidea
- Family: Teiidae
- Genus: Aspidoscelis
- Species: A. espiritensis

Binomial name
- Aspidoscelis espiritensis (Van Denburgh & Slevin, 1921)

Species of lizard

Aspidoscelis espiritensis, the Espiritu Santo whiptail, is a species of teiid lizard endemic to Isla Espíritu Santo in Mexico.
