= Aspidoscelis calidipes =

Conservation status
- Least Concern (IUCN 3.1)

Scientific classification
- Kingdom: Animalia
- Phylum: Chordata
- Class: Reptilia
- Order: Squamata
- Family: Teiidae
- Genus: Aspidoscelis
- Species: A. calidipes

Binomial name
- Aspidoscelis calidipes (Duellman, 1955)

Species of lizard

Aspidoscelis calidipes, the Tepalcatepec Valley whiptail, is a species of teiid lizard endemic to Mexico.
