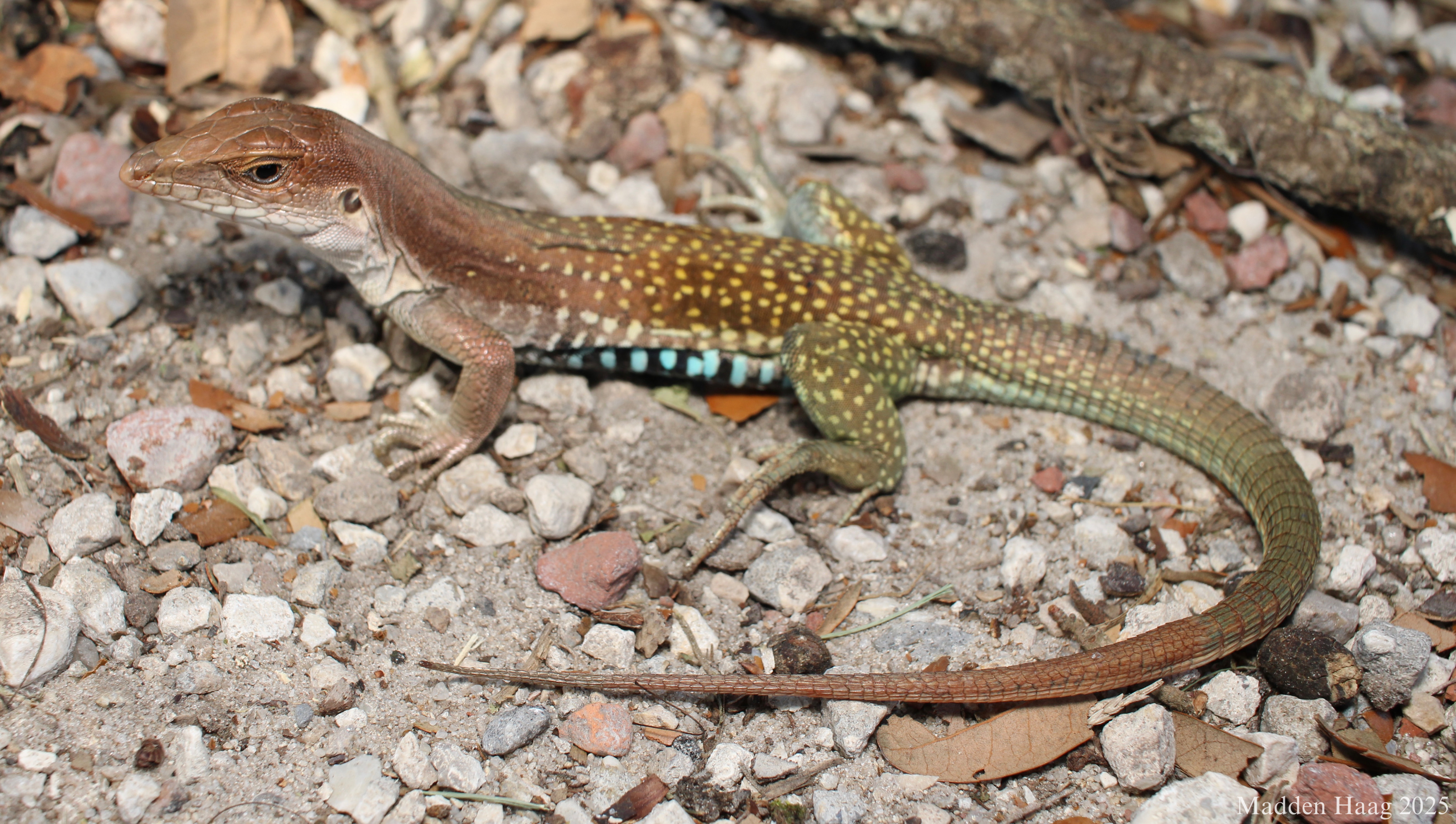
- Giant whiptail (Aspidoscelis motaguae)

Conservation status
- Least Concern (IUCN 3.1)

Scientific classification
- Kingdom: Animalia
- Phylum: Chordata
- Class: Reptilia
- Order: Squamata
- Suborder: Lacertoidea
- Family: Teiidae
- Genus: Aspidoscelis
- Species: A. motaguae

Binomial name
- Aspidoscelis motaguae (Sackett, 1941)

= Giant whiptail =

Species of reptile

The giant whiptail (Aspidoscelis motaguae) is a species of teiid lizard native to Mexico, Guatemala, El Salvador, Honduras, and Nicaragua. It has also been introduced to Florida in the United States where it is considered an invasive species.
