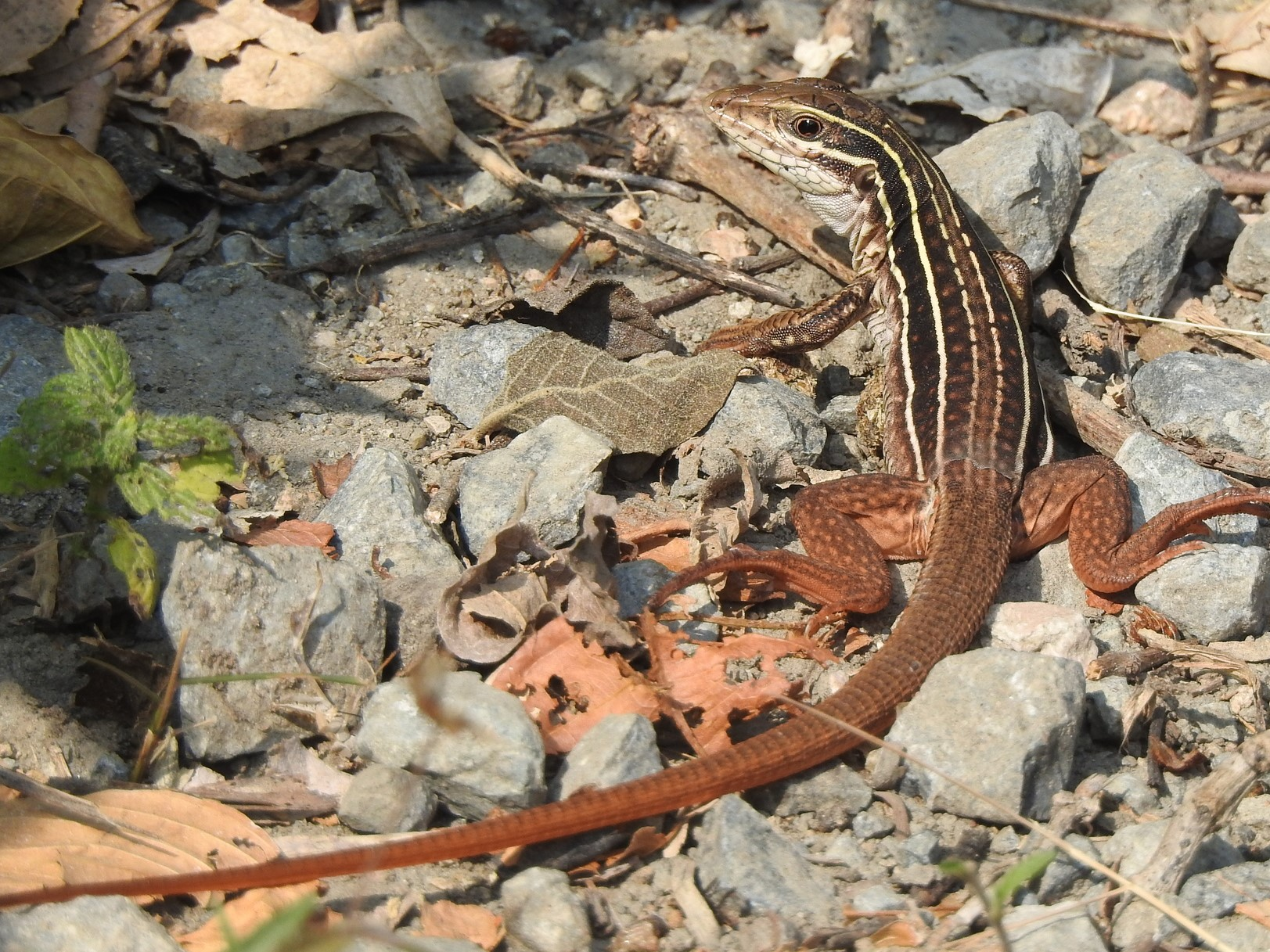

Conservation status
- Least Concern (IUCN 3.1)

Scientific classification
- Kingdom: Animalia
- Phylum: Chordata
- Class: Reptilia
- Order: Squamata
- Suborder: Lacertoidea
- Family: Teiidae
- Genus: Aspidoscelis
- Species: A. communis

Binomial name
- Aspidoscelis communis (Cope, 1878)

= Aspidoscelis communis =

Species of lizard

Aspidoscelis communis, also known as the Colima giant whiptail, is a species of teiid lizard endemic to Mexico.
