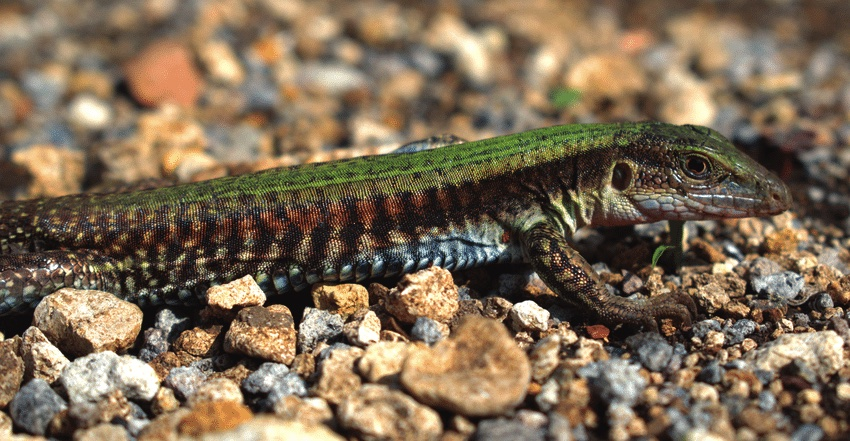

Conservation status
- Least Concern (IUCN 3.1)

Scientific classification
- Kingdom: Animalia
- Phylum: Chordata
- Class: Reptilia
- Order: Squamata
- Family: Teiidae
- Genus: Aspidoscelis
- Species: A. costatus

Binomial name
- Aspidoscelis costatus (Cope, 1878)

Synonyms
- Cnemidophorus costatus Cope, 1878; Cnemidophorus alpinus Maslin & J. Walker, 1965; Aspidoscelis costata Reeder, C. Cole & Dessauer, 2002

= Aspidoscelis costatus =

Species of lizard

Aspidoscelis costatus, also known as the western Mexico whiptail, is a species of whiptail lizard endemic to Mexico, including Guerrero, Morelos, and Puebla in southern Mexico, as well as other Mexican states. Its range spans both temperate and tropical habitats, and even densely populated urban areas. Its common name, the Western Mexico Whiptail, can easily be confused with the Western Whiptail, which refers to a different lizard, Aspidoscelis tigris.

A small lizard, up to only 4 inches SVL (snout to vent length), this striped lizard has a pointed snout, a slender body, a pair of long hind legs, and an extremely long tail. Its whip-like, tapering tail, if not recently shortened from caudal autotomy (self-amputation of the tail), may be more than two times its SVL. Therefore, although this dwarf lizard has a short SVL length, it can reach a total length of close to 1 foot, tail included, giving the false impression that it's a long lizard. When the lizards fight to maintain territory or compete for mates, they whip their long tails around, therefore its common name is the whiptail lizard. They are often found under low desert scrubs, rocks, or nosing around leaf litter. Whiptails are diurnal but mostly solitary creatures, except during the breeding season, when males start accompanying females around.

Aspidoscelis are not sit-and-wait ambush predators. Instead, they are non-territorial, active "widely foraging" lizards. They move quite frequently, and almost incessantly, in short gaits and at a frenetic pace. Foraging is their primary activity throughout the day. They are aseen busy probing with their snouts under leaf-litter, in crevices, scratching in the ground, or digging furiously through piles of accumulated debris. When they are on the move under plants or through leaf-litter, their jerky bouts of start-stop movement create unique crunching sounds from disturbed dry leaves. When Aspidoscelis must run away from threats, they run fast at top speeds of 18 mph (29 km/h), and appear to keep their tails behind the body in a straight line similar to a galloping crocodile, running across barren open areas to reach the cover of dense shrubs.

There are limited reports about Aspidoscelis costatus, simply because the nomenclatural changes for the genus Aspidoscelis was recommended by T.W. Reeder et al. as recent as 2002. Prior to that, this species was under the genus Cnemidophorus, in the family Teiidae. As a matter of fact, the seminal documentations of this species, particularly of some of its subspecies, go back to as early as 1959, albeit under different taxa.

Aspidoscelis costatus has 8 subspecies, all of which are endemic to Mexico.

== Taxonomy, history, and etymology ==
There are several genus of whiptail lizards in the family Teiidae. The genus of Aspidoscelis lizard was originally under the genus Cnemidophorus until 2002, when Reeder proposed that there are significant divergent characters, including morphological and genetic differences, for many species that warrant regrouping.

Morphological deviations between Cnemidophorus and Aspidoscelis are detailed in the Physical Description section.

Nomenclatural changes of genus unavoidably causes confusion and difficulties for researchers. To illustrate this dramatic change, the subspecies Aspidoscelis costata zweifeli was named Cnemidophorus sacki zweifeli when it was first reported by Duellman et al. in 1960. In this seminal 1960 publication, Duellman states "In recognition of the important contributions to the systematics of the genus Cnemidophorus made by Dr. Richard G. Zweifel, I propose that the subspecies of Cnemidophorus sacki in the Tepalcatepec Valley be named as follows: Cnemidophorus sacki zweifeli, a new subspecies."

That subspecies is the nowadays Aspidoscelis costata zweifeli. The subspecies name of "zweifeli" is still kept to in honor of Dr. Zweifel, an American herpetologist, who contributed immensely to the documentation of the nowadays Aspidoscelis costata species. Out of the eight costata subspecies, Dr. Zweifel reported/named five of them.

== Physical description ==
Western Mexico Whiptails have scaly skin with stripes, bowed legs, and pointed snout. It does not have any vertebral crests (spines).

Western Mexico Whiptails are striped lizards. They have multiple straight dorsal stripes with varying color patterns on grey, brown, or black ground, often mixed with pale-hued spots, or bar-like pattern. Ventrally, the lizard has abdominal, and pelvic regions that are either cream colored, or sometimes light to medium blue, sometimes even red in the pelvic region. The gular (throat) region can have increased intensity of coloration that ranges from pink to red. These colors and pattens are subject to individual variation, ontogenetic (juvenile, adult) variation, sexual (male, female) dimorphism, and even seasonal changes.

Males progressed through stages of dorsal pattern changes from pale stripes, dark intervening fields, no spots to spots, and diverse pale configurations set in a black ground color. Females in this population (females representing all stages of color patterns) showed similar changes but did not lose striping as they grew. Ontogenetic changes in ventral color patterns were also apparent, with males becoming more colorful than females.

Morphological deviations between Cnemidophorus and Aspidoscelis refer to the fact that Aspidoscelis has (1) forked tongue structure posteriorly (2) no basal tongue sheath that lots of lizards have (3) smooth ventral scutes (enlarged scales in the belly) (4) eight rows of ventral scutes at midbody (5) no anal spurs in males (anal spurs are used by males to stimulate and position females during mating) (6) mesoptychial scales (scales in the gular/throat region of the lizard) abruptly enlarged (7) three parietal scales (enlarged scales on the crown, as often seen in snakes), and three or four supraocular scales (enlarged scales above the eyes) on each side.

Like crocodiles, Western Mexico Whiptail have nictitating membrane eyelids, also called the third eyelids, which is a translucent membrane that, when the lizard blinks, is drawn from the inner corner of the eyes across the eyeball surface, while its upper and lower eyelids remain open. This allows moistening, protection of eye surface, and a certain degree of vision while blinking.

== Distribution and habitat ==

Most species of whiptail lizards prefer dry climates and seek out habitats in deserts. Therefore, many species of whiptail lizards are found throughout Sonoran Desert, spanning northwestern Mexico and southern California, a region with sparse vegetation, such as sagebrush, low desert scrubs, grasslands, woodlands and pine forests.

Similarly, Aspidoscelis costatus prefers natural habitats such as savanna, and shrubland in brushy, broken country. But they also extend their habits into open areas of tropical low deciduous forest and thorn forest, low spiny sub-evergreen forest and medium sub-deciduous forest. spanning both temperate and tropical climates in western and southwestern Mexico. Since considerable habitat clearance has taken place for intensive agriculture or human settlements, we are starting to see urban population of Aspidoscelis costatus, even in densely populated cities, at least for Aspidoscelis costatus costatus, which is a subspecies of Western Mexico Whiptail lizard, commonly named Balsas Basin Whiptail.

One research paper suggested that global warming has affected the habitats of Western Mexico Whiptail lizard. Some climatic groups of Aspidoscelis costatus costatus are exhibiting reductions and others exhibiting expansions in their distribution. Redistribution to higher elevation may potentially occur in response to climate warming.

== Ecology and behavior ==
Western Mexico whiptail are striped lizards, which tend to be active foragers, constantly moving around than lizards with cryptic patterns. It records very high moves per minute or percent time moving values.

All whiptail lizards in the genera Aspidoscelis are active at body temperatures between 37 and 40 °C (99 and 104 °F).

Since they need the sunlight to heat their bodies up for activities, whiptails adjust their activity to take advantage of heat sources. Larger whiptails are present in shaded regions more so that their bodies don't overheat. Smaller whiptails can heat and cool their bodies quickly so they are more comfortable in open areas even in the summer.

Aspidoscelis are not sit-and-wait ambush predators. Instead, they are active foragers. They move quite frequently, and almost constantly, in short gaits and at a frenetic pace. Foraging is their primary activity throughout the day.

When they are on the move under plants or through leaf-litter, their jerky, start-stop movements create unique crunching switch sounds from disturbed dry leaves.

When Whiptails must run away from threats, they run fast at top speeds of 18 mph (29 km/h), and appear to keep theirs tail behind the body in a straight line. They do not whip their tails when they run.

== Predators ==
This species and virtually all Aspidoscelis species are preyed upon by snakes and predaceous birds. The active mode of foraging, constantly moving behavioral pattern of whiptail lizards may subject them to a high frequency of predation attempts by diurnal predators.

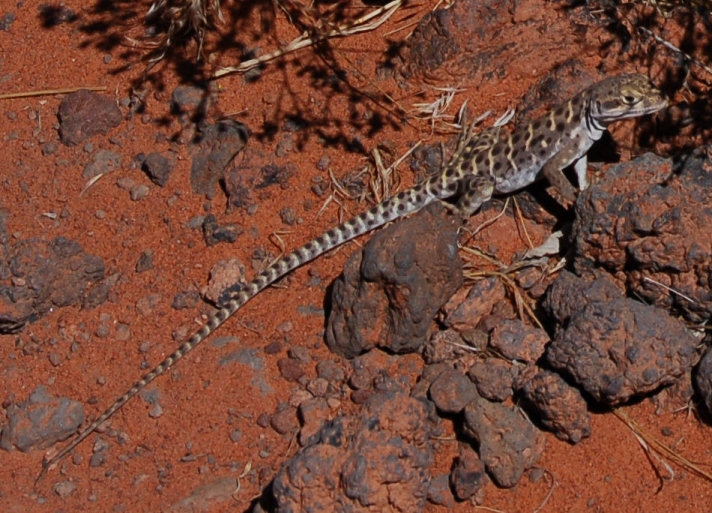
The Long-nosed leopard lizard who predates on the whiptail

Such predators include owls, eagles, hawks, coyotes, foxes, bobcats, virtually all species of snakes large enough to swallow them, and even larger lizards such as collared lizards, long-nose leopard lizards.

Many species of bird of prey take whiptails for diet. It was found that whiptail lizards make up a large percentage of the food items consumed by roadrunners (a largely terrestrial, speedy running bird).

Whiptail lizards are fast runners, and will try to flee the predator. When in danger, like most lizards, whiptail lizard will drop a portion of their tail in response to an attack by a predator. This defensive strategy is called caudal autotomy, meant to distract the predator since muscles in the tail would continue contracting, causing the tail to flop and wiggle around. The lizard tail is easily broken due to fracture planes in the tail, although it will take the lizard lots of foraging to gather enough energy to regrow the tail.

The food habits of whiptails at times overlaps considerably with those of other dwarf lizards. Competition for food is minimal since whiptails prey on insects that are seasonally abundant, and foraging habitat preferences are different between different species.

== Reproduction ==
About one third of whiptail lizards are parthenogenic, which is asexual reproduction by development from an ovum without fertilization, essentially cloning, but with strategies to create diversities. This is not the case with Western Mexico Whiptail lizard, which is a bisexual species. They have sexual and dioecious (having the male and female reproductive organs in separate individuals) reproduction. Aspidoscelis costatus males, like the majority of other lizards, reproduce through cloaca, which is an orifice, sort of semicircular-shaped, located in the ventral side (underside) of the tail base of the lizard, just distal to its hindlegs. Digestive wastes like urine and feces are eliminated through cloaca. And the male reproductive organs, called hemipenes, which come in a bilateral pair, are held inverted within the cloaca when not in use. During copulation, the pair of hemipenes becomes evert, and sperm are ejaculated. Usually only one hemipenis is used at a time. Female also use cloaca for elimination of digestive waste and for reproduction. For female lizards, the cloaca is the external genital opening for the genital canal, equivalent to vagina in mammals. Copulation is performed through cloacal kiss, in which the male and female press their cloacas together as the male discharges sperm. Unlike Cnemidophorus males, Aspidoscelis costatus males do not have anal spurs, or pelvic spurs, which are vestigal limbs used by males to stimulate and position females during mating.

=== Mating ===
Female reproductive cycle was markedly seasonal, recorded from April (end of the dry season) through August (middle of the rainy season). And this is in regardless of climate. Same timing of female reproduction period is reported for populations inhabiting different climate zones, including semi-humid warm climate to temperate-zone, to higher-elevation. Reproduction is associated with day length rather than with temperature.

Aspidoscelis costata lizards exhibit associated reproductive cycles (also called synchronic reproductive cycles), in which males and females reach the maximum sperm production, mating, and ovulation activities during the same period. However, male A. costatus reaches reproduction maturity at a smaller SVL length than female (about 2 inches for male versus 2.5 inches for female).

=== Female/male interactions ===
==== Accompaniment ====
During mating season, a male whiptail appear to be continuously sexually active throughout the season. A male A. costatus would starts escorting a female whiptail around, guarding her, a behavior that is called accompaniment. However, only some females will be receptive (female receptivity is probably related to ovulation in females). Even if the female lizard is receptive, she always seems uninterested and ignores the presence of the courting male. The male A. costata accompanies his receptive mate for only 9 hours per day for 2–5 days, at a distance of 0.5 m or less, and practically all copulations take place during that time.

In Aspidoscelis costatus, accompaniment increases the chance of successful copulation. Accompanied females copulated 6.7 times more with consensual, accompanying males. Opportunist copulations were also observed, however it is insignificant compared to accompanying copulation partners. During copulation, males will only copulate with their accompanying partner, and successive copulations are common to maximize sperm transfer.

==== Copulation ====
When time comes for mating, the male A. costatus would mount the female, throw his front leg on his mate's torso, straddle her and encircling her body with his hind legs, and scramble to try to shove his tail under his partner's tail, while the female at times remains motionless, and at times appears to be trying to buck him off. Mating is performed by cloacal (see Physical Description) copulation, commonly referred to as cloacal kiss or cloacal apposition. Although everted hemipenis could hardly be seen by the observers, the pair of everted hemipenis are protruding out of the male cloaca, and one of them is intromitted (inserted) into the female's cloaca, an act called hemipenis intromission. Aspidoscelis costatus males do not have the pair of anal spurs (also called pelvic spurs) to position the females,[9] but simply maneuvers to circle his long tail under that of his female partner to get into a hammerlock, ventral-side to ventral-side, so that the male and female can press their cloacas together. After hemipenis intromission is achieved, and doughnut posture is adopted, the mating pair is tangled motionless much like wrestlers in a hammerlock. They remain in this position for 5~10 minutes, during which time ejaculation takes place. Sperm ejaculated is actually stored in a "sperm storage structure" (the seminal receptacle) in the female cloaca. The male then rapidly dismounts from the female.

=== Mate guarding ===
Mate guarding can be costly for males due to the loss of energy from less food intake and increased aggressive behavior. However, the behavior persists, likely due to the gain in fitness surpassing the survival cost. During the allotted time where males follow females, they repeatedly repel approaching males, reducing the possibility of extrapair copulations, and increasing aggressive behavior and risk of injury. Aggressive behavior is observed through, approaches, lunges, pursuit of enemies, back arching, fighting, and biting. If mate guarding fails, the male companion is not displaced, but will face sperm competition. They eat fewer prey in order to accomplish this task, not because food is shared with females, but likely in order to stay close to the female, or to signal genetic fitness. This male declined ingestion rate was found not to be further affected by larger body weight, following a larger female, or fending off more aggressions. Following a larger female however resulted in increased aggression, attributed to the female's fecund.

=== Oviposition ===
Western Mexico whiptail lizard are oviparous (producing eggs that develop and hatch outside the maternal body). Females reproductive event varies, from a single clutch up to three clutches annually, with range of clutch size of 1~5 eggs. Clutch size and size of female are positively correlated. And males tend to compete more intensely for larger, more fecund females. But in general, Aspidoscelis lizards, especially striped species such as costatus, tend to be active foragers, always in search of their prey. Due to their active foraging strategy, body shape, and escape strategies, species in the genus Aspidoscelis tend to show a relatively small clutch size, proportional to their body mass.

=== Site selection ===
Expecting females dig holes (referred to as nest) in the soil, often under rocks, about 32 cm long and 14 cm wide, in which the oviposition takes place. After clutch of eggs are laid, the female whiptail would not cover the clutch with soil, which likely enable the hatchlings more freedom to leave the cavity. [23] The female lizard would then leave without incubation or guarding the nests. No further parental care is provided. The clutch is left to incubate under a most favorable environment, a moist and warm nest, with minimal temperature fluctuations under rocks, selected by the female lizard.[23]

Eggs typically take 60 to 75 days of incubation to hatch. Juveniles usually hatch during July or August.

== Relationship with humans ==
When human visitors approach and they feel threatened, the lizards would burst into motion, run across the arid land and disappear behind the closest low scrubs or rock. They are fast runners and hard to catch. If human hold them in their hands, the whiptail may attempt a harmless bite.

== Conservation status ==
In 2007, Aspidoscelis costatus are listed as "Least Concern", following IUCN criteria.

According to Wilson et al. (2013), A. costatus scores a medium environmental vulnerability score principally due to its restricted distribution, and threats from intensive agriculture or human settlements., considerable habitat clearance and environmental disturbance in localized areas for human-modified habitats.

== Subspecies ==
The following eight subspecies are recognized as being valid, including the nominotypical subspecies.

- Aspidoscelis costatus barrancorum (Zweifel, 1959)
- Aspidoscelis costatus costatus (Cope, 1878)
- Aspidoscelis costatus griseocephalus (Zweifel, 1959)
- Aspidoscelis costatus huico (Zweifel, 1959)
- Aspidoscelis costatus mazatlanensis (Zweifel, 1959)
- Aspidoscelis costatus nigrigularis (Zweifel, 1959)
- Aspidoscelis costatus occidentalis (Gadow, 1906)
- Aspidoscelis costatus zweifeli (Duellman, 1960)

Nota bene: A trinomial authority in parentheses indicates that the subspecies was originally described in a genus other than Aspidoscelis.

== Etymology ==
The subspecific name, zweifeli, is in honor of American herpetologist Richard G. Zweifel.
