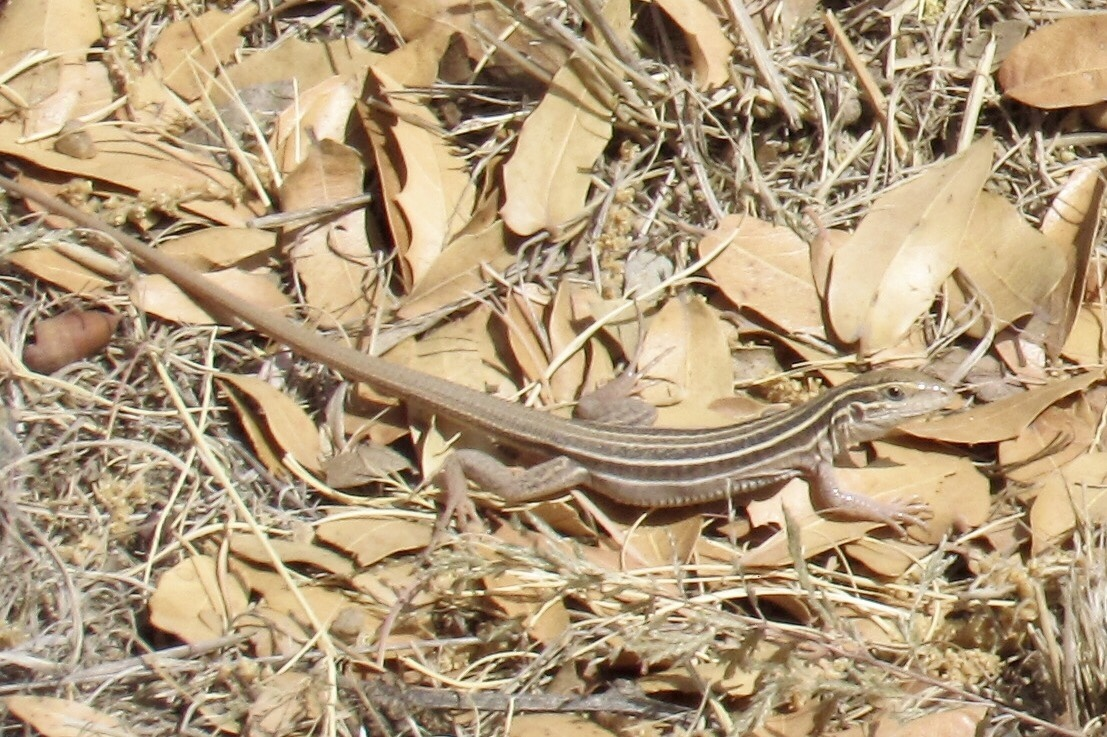

Conservation status
- Least Concern (IUCN 3.1)

Scientific classification
- Kingdom: Animalia
- Phylum: Chordata
- Class: Reptilia
- Order: Squamata
- Family: Teiidae
- Genus: Aspidoscelis
- Species: A. stictogrammus

Binomial name
- Aspidoscelis stictogrammus (Burger, 1950)

= Giant spotted whiptail =

Species of lizard

The giant spotted whiptail (Aspidoscelis stictogrammus) is a species of teiid lizard found in the United States (Arizona) and Mexico.
