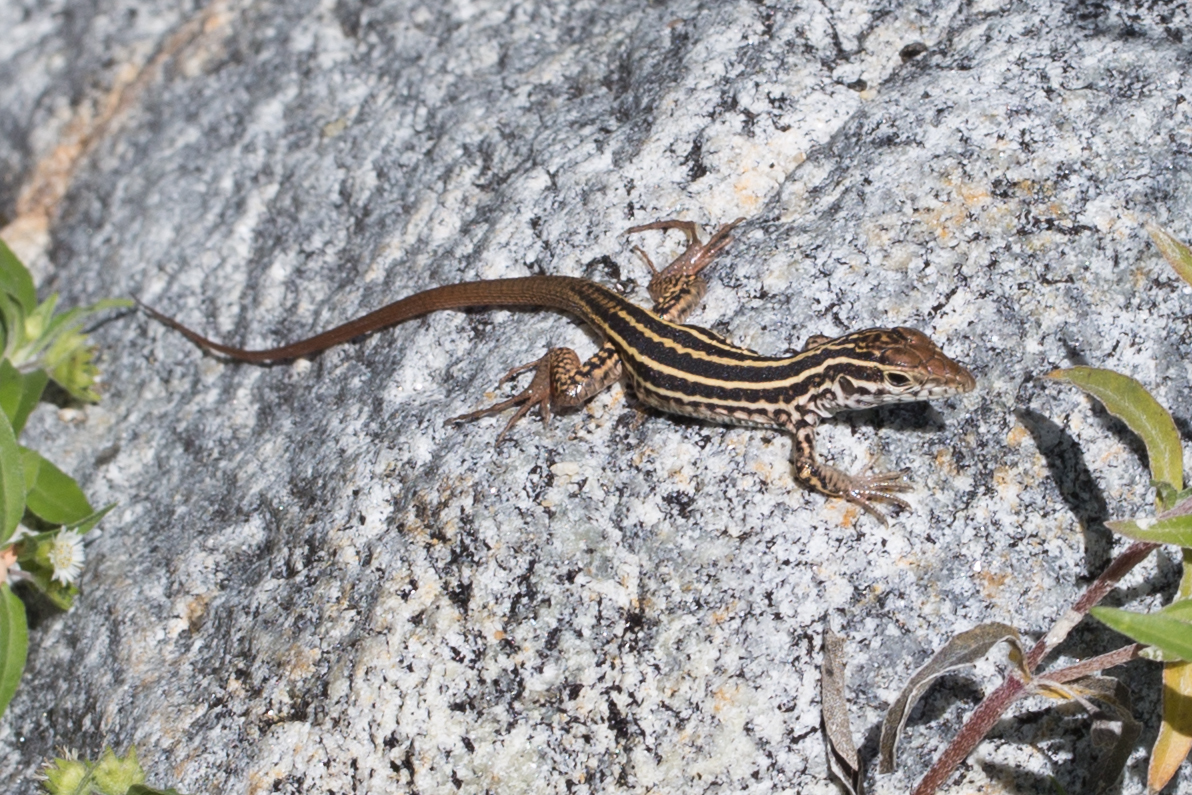

Scientific classification
- Domain: Eukaryota
- Kingdom: Animalia
- Phylum: Chordata
- Class: Reptilia
- Order: Squamata
- Family: Teiidae
- Genus: Aspidoscelis
- Species: A. maximus

Binomial name
- Aspidoscelis maximus (Cope, 1863)

= Cape Region whiptail =

Species of reptile

The Cape Region whiptail (Aspidoscelis maximus) is a species of teiid lizard endemic to the Baja California Peninsula of Mexico.
