= Marbled whiptail =

Scientific classification
- Kingdom: Animalia
- Phylum: Chordata
- Class: Reptilia
- Order: Squamata
- Suborder: Lacertoidea
- Family: Teiidae
- Genus: Aspidoscelis
- Species: A. marmoratus

Binomial name
- Aspidoscelis marmoratus Baird & Girard, 1852

Synonyms
- Cnemidophorus tigris marmoratus Burger, 1950; Aspidoscelis tigris marmorata Reeder, 2002

Species of lizard

The marbled whiptail (Aspidoscelis marmoratus) is a species of lizard found in the United States, in southern New Mexico and Texas, and in northern Mexico, in Coahuila, Chihuahua and Durango.

== Description ==
The marbled whiptail grows from 8 to 12 inches in length. It is grey or black overall in color with 4 to 8 yellow or white stripes, often with dark mottling, giving it a marbled appearance. Their underside is white or pale yellow, with a peach coloration on the throat. They are slender bodied, with long tails.

== Behavior ==
Like most other species of whiptail lizards, the marbled whiptail is diurnal and insectivorous. It is wary, energetic, and fast moving, darting for cover if approached. Its preferred habitat is semiarid, sandy areas with sparse vegetation, or the open edges of wooded areas. Breeding takes place in the spring, with up to four eggs laid sometime between the months of May and August, hatch happening usually in August during the wet season. The eggs hatch in six to eight weeks. A second clutch of eggs is occasionally laid in mid summer. Hatchlings look much like the adults, except they have bright blue colored tails.

== Facultative parthenogenesis ==
Facultative parthenogenesis can occur in A. marmoratus haploid unfertilized oocytes by a post-meiotic mechanism resulting in genome wide homozygosity. In many species that are facultatively parthenogenetic, the transition to the completely homozygous condition results in exposure of the genetic load leading to embryonic mortality and an elevated rate of congenital malformations. However, in A. marmoratus a small percentage of unfertilized oocytes undergo parthenogenesis and yet develop normally. Thus, in this case, facultative parthenogenesis has the potential for allowing purifying selection to occur with the result that all lethal recessive alleles are purged in just one generation.

== Subspecies ==
There are two recognized subspecies of A. marmoratus:

- Aspidoscelis marmoratus marmoratus (Baird & Girard, 1852)
- Aspidoscelis marmoratus reticuloriens (Vance, 1978)
