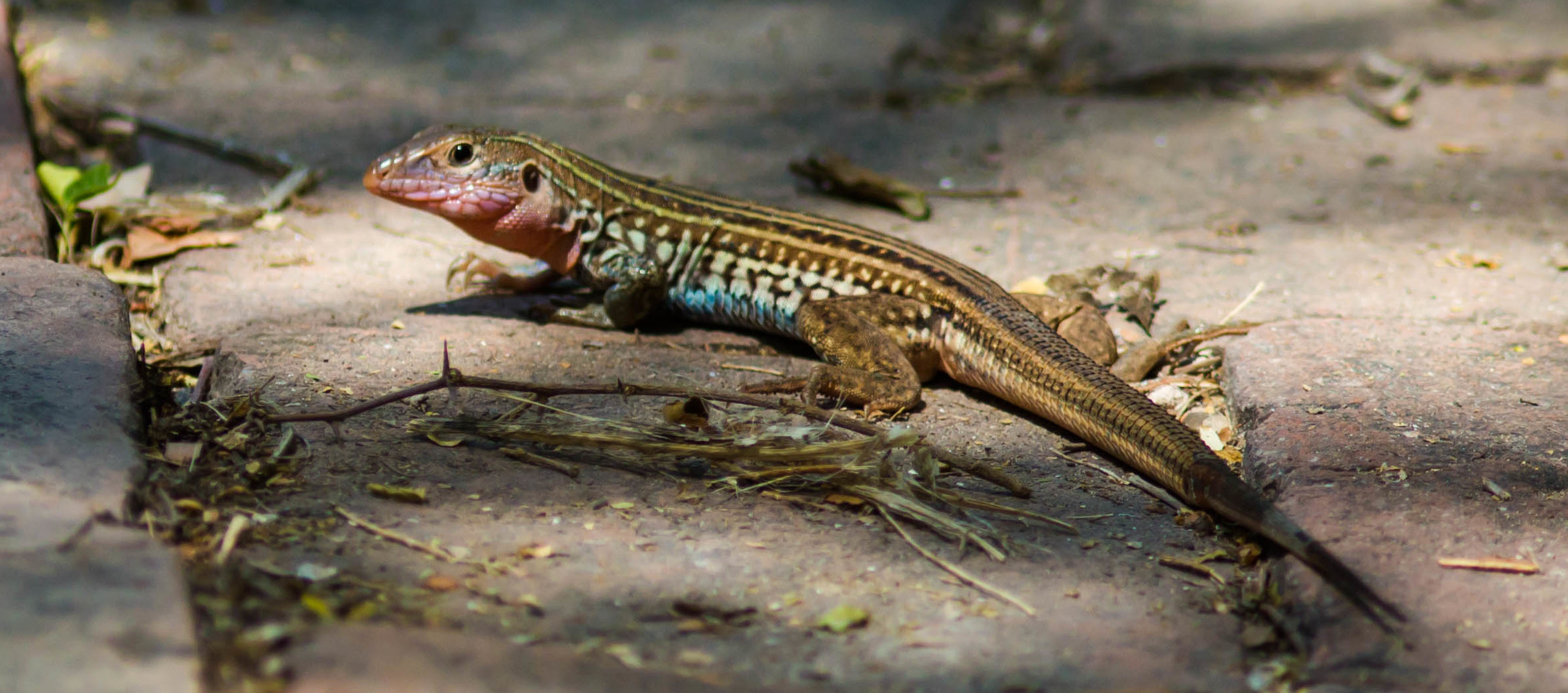
- Male, in Hidalgo County, Texas

Conservation status
- Least Concern (IUCN 3.1)

Scientific classification
- Kingdom: Animalia
- Phylum: Chordata
- Class: Reptilia
- Order: Squamata
- Family: Teiidae
- Genus: Aspidoscelis
- Species: A. gularis

Binomial name
- Aspidoscelis gularis (Baird & Girard, 1852)

Synonyms
- Cnemidophorus gularis Baird & Girard, 1852; Cnemidophorus sackii gularis — H.M. Smith & Taylor, 1950; Aspidoscelis gularis — Reeder et al., 2002

= Texas spotted whiptail =

Species of lizard

The Texas spotted whiptail (Aspidoscelis gularis) is a species of long-tailed lizard, in the family Teiidae. The species is endemic to the south central and southwestern United States and northern Mexico. Six subspecies are recognized as being valid.

== Geographic range ==
A. gularis is found in New Mexico, Oklahoma, and Texas, and in the Mexican states of Aguascalientes, Campeche, Coahuila, Guanajuato, Hidalgo, Jalisco, Michoacán, Nuevo León, Querétaro, San Luis Potosí, Tamaulipas, and Veracruz.

== Description ==
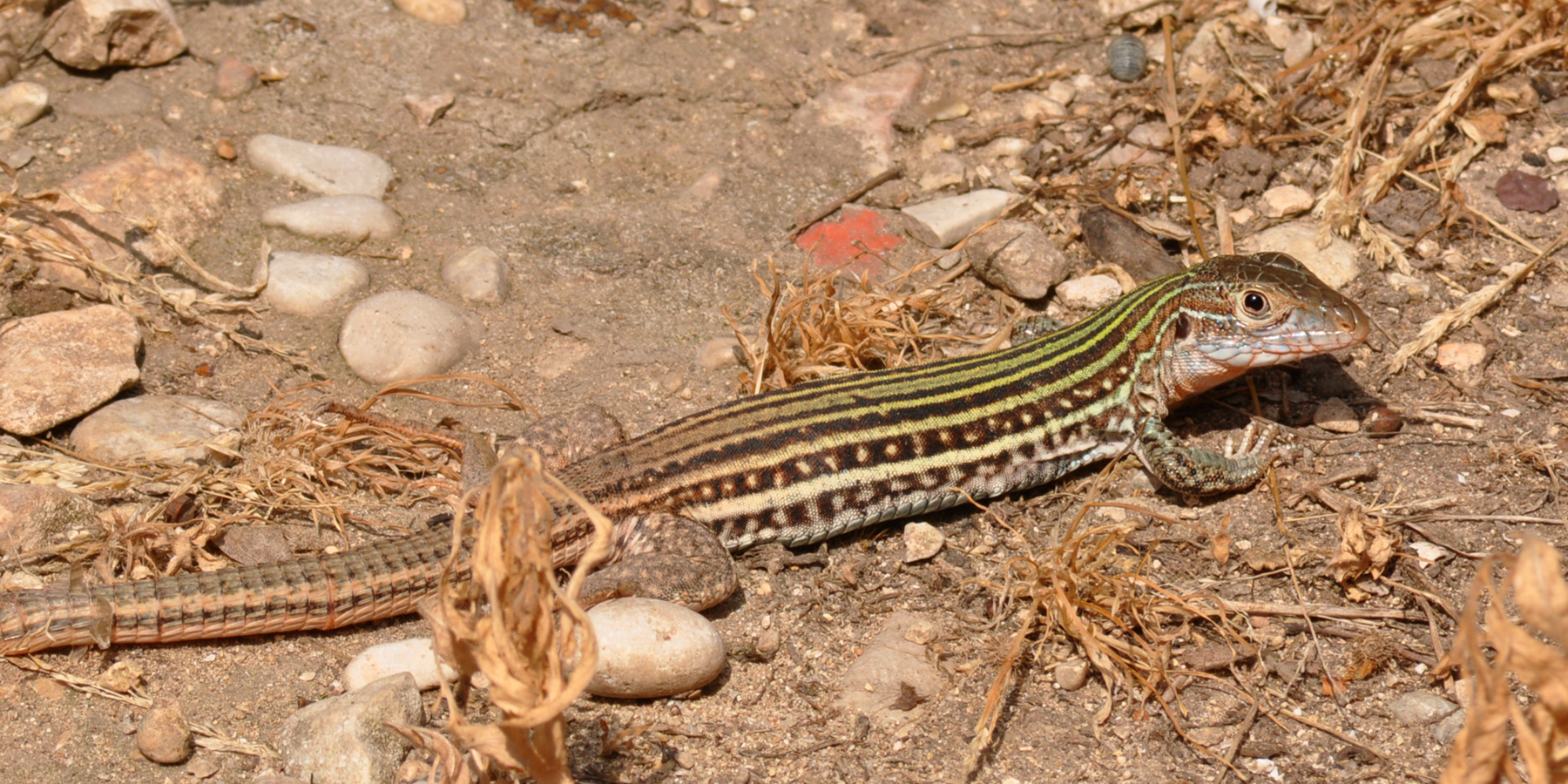
A. gularis in Bandera County, Texas

The Texas spotted whiptail grows to 6.5 to 11 inches (17 to 28 cm) in total length (including tail). It is typically a tan brown or green-brown in color, with a pattern of seven distinct grey or white stripes that run the length of the body, and stop at the tail, with light colored spots along the sides. The underside is uniformly white in color. Males often have a red-colored throat, blue belly, and black or blue patches on the chest, while females have only a pink-colored throat. The tail is long compared to the body, usually close to three times the body length. The tail is usually a uniform peach or tan color.

== Behavior and habitat ==
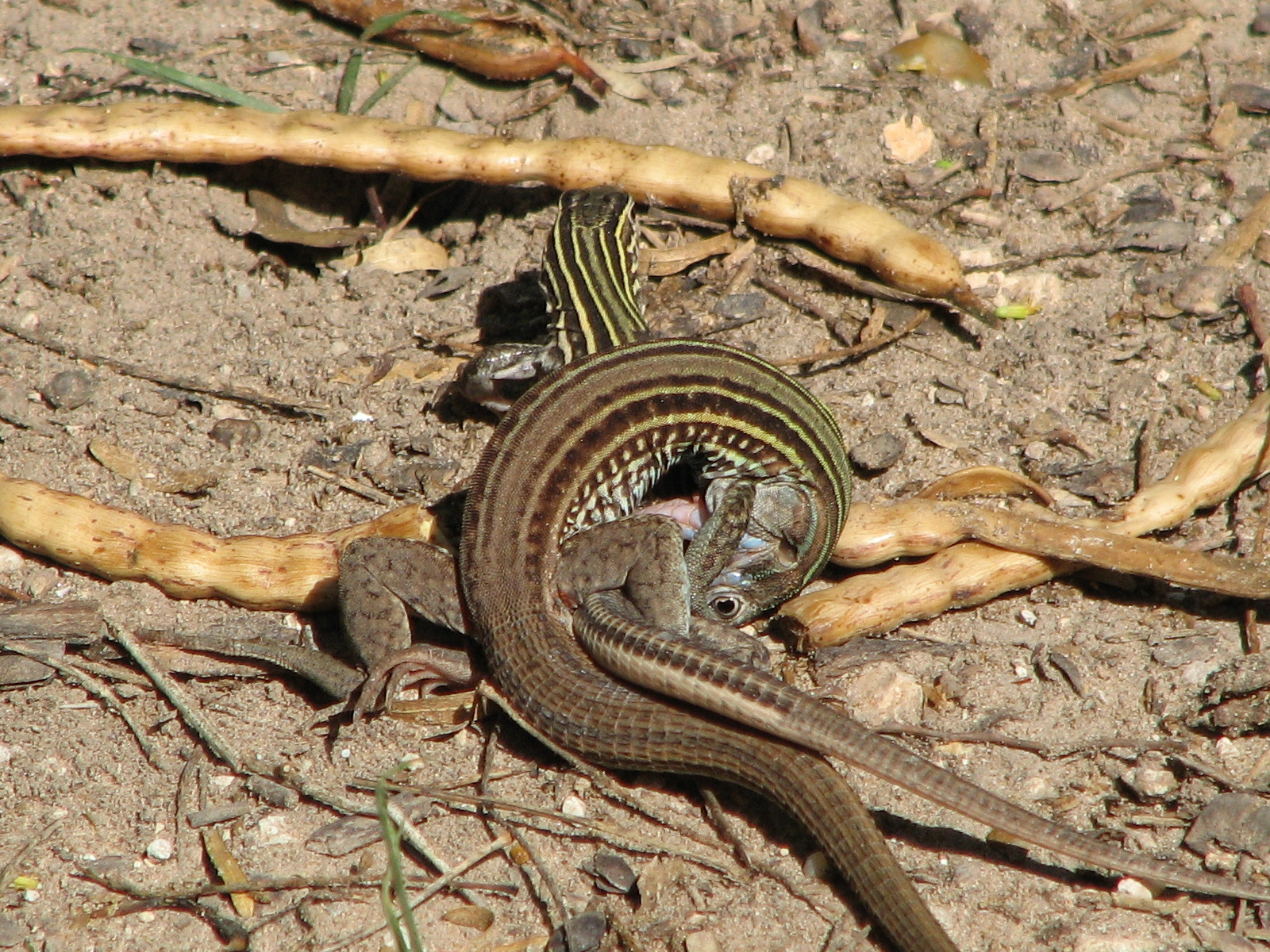
Mating

A. gularis is diurnal and insectivorous. It is highly active and found in a wide variety of habitats, from grassland and semi-arid regions, to canyons and rocky terrain, typically not far from a permanent water source. Like many other whiptail lizards, it is capable of tail autotomy, shedding its tail to escape predation.

== Reproduction ==
Breeding of sexually mature A. gularis occurs in the spring, and a clutch of 1-5 eggs is laid in the early summer.

== Subspecies ==
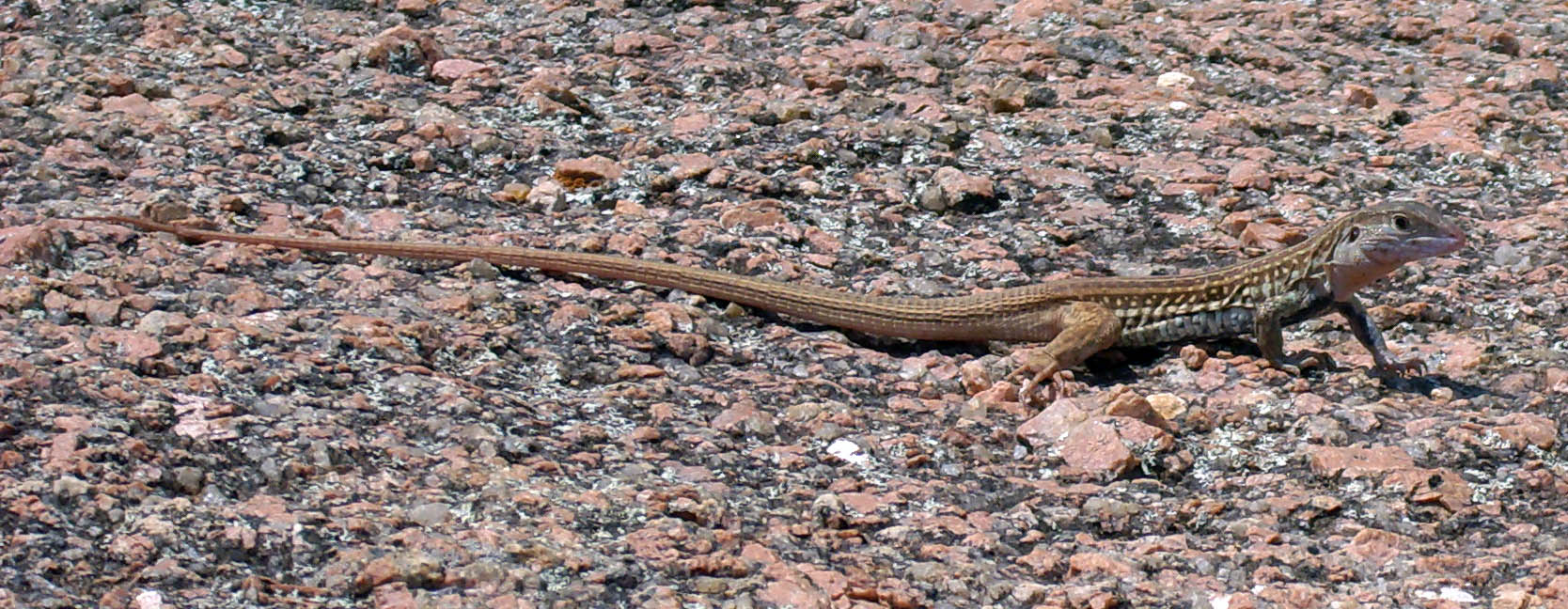
A. gularis near Enchanted Rock State Natural Area

Six subspecies of the Texas spotted whiptail, including the nominotypical subspecies, are recognized as being valid.

- Aspidoscelis gularis gularis (Baird & Girard, 1852)
- Aspidoscelis gularis colossus (Dixon, Lieb & Ketchersid, 1971)
- Aspidoscelis gularis pallidus (Duellman & Zweifel, 1962)
- Aspidoscelis gularis rauni (Walker, 1967)
- Aspidoscelis gularis semiannulatus (Walker, 1967)
- Aspidoscelis gularis semifasciatus (Cope, 1892)

Nota bene: A trinomial authority in parentheses indicates that the subspecies was originally described in a genus other than Aspidoscelis.

== Etymology ==
The subspecific name, rauni, is in honor of American zoologist Gerald George Raun (born 1932).
