= Aspidoscelis cozumela =

Conservation status
- Least Concern (IUCN 3.1)

Scientific classification
- Kingdom: Animalia
- Phylum: Chordata
- Class: Reptilia
- Order: Squamata
- Family: Teiidae
- Genus: Aspidoscelis
- Species: A. cozumela

Binomial name
- Aspidoscelis cozumela (Gadow, 1906)

Species of lizard

Aspidoscelis cozumela, the Cozumel racerunner, is a species of teiid lizard endemic to Mexico. This species is a unisexual hybrid.
