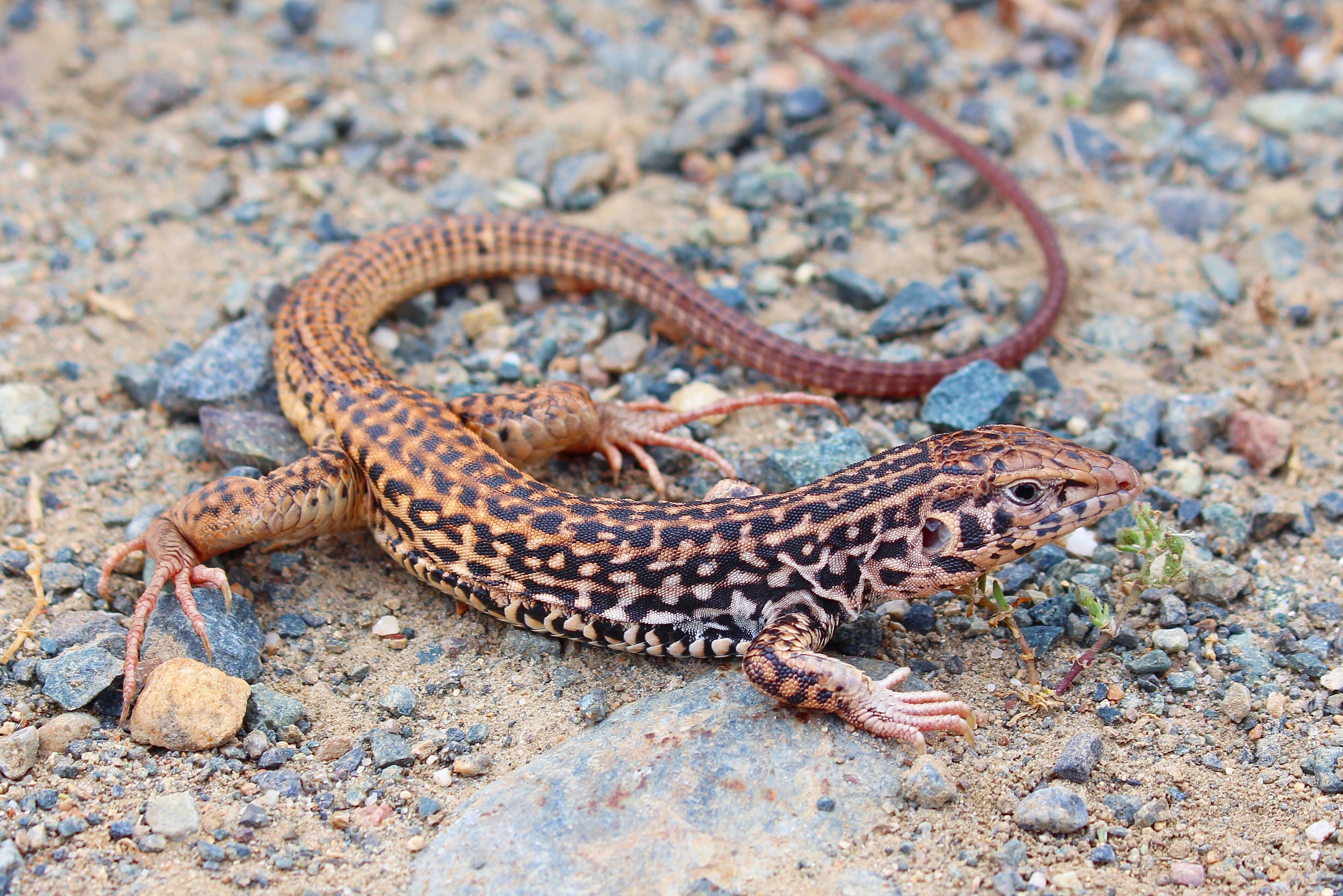
- California whiptail (Aspidoscelis tigris munda)

Conservation status
- Least Concern (IUCN 3.1)

Scientific classification
- Kingdom: Animalia
- Phylum: Chordata
- Class: Reptilia
- Order: Squamata
- Family: Teiidae
- Genus: Aspidoscelis
- Species: A. tigris

Binomial name
- Aspidoscelis tigris (Baird & Girard, 1852)

Synonyms
- Cnemidophorus tigris Baird & Girard, 1852

= Western whiptail =

Species of lizard

The western whiptail (Aspidoscelis tigris) is a species of lizard in the family Teiidae. The species is found throughout most of the southwestern United States and northern Mexico. Most of its populations appear stable, and it is not listed as endangered in any of the states comprising its range. It lives in a wide variety of habitats, including deserts and semiarid shrubland, usually in areas with sparse vegetation; it also may be found in woodland, open dry forest, and riparian growth. It lives in burrows. Major differences between this species and the checkered whiptail (Aspidoscelis tesselatus) include the lack of enlarged scales anterior to the gular fold and the presence of enlarged postantebrachial scales. It was previously known as Cnemidophorus tigris, until phylogenetic analyses concluded that the genus Cnemidophorus was polyphyletic. Since it does not migrate, a number of forms have developed in different regions, several of which have been given subspecific names – for example the California whiptail, Aspidoscelis tigris munda.

== Taxonomy ==
=== Subspecies ===
Including the nominotypical subspecies, 16 subspecies of Aspidoscelis tigris are recognized as being valid.

- A. t. aethiops (Cope, 1900)
- A. t. dickersonae (Van Denburgh & Slevin, 1921)
- A. t. disparilis (Dickerson, 1919)
- A. t. multiscutata (Cope, 1892)
- A. t. munda (Camp, 1916)
- A. t. nigroriens (Hendricks & Dixon, 1986)
- A. t. pulchra (K.L. Williams, H.M. Smith & Chrapliwy, 1960)
- A. t. punctata (Walker & Maslin, 1964)
- A. t. punctilinealis (Dickerson, 1919)
- A. t. rubida (Cope, 1892)
- A. t. septentrionalis (Burger, 1950)
- A. t. stejnegeri (Van Denburgh, 1894)
- A. t. tigris (Baird & Girard, 1852)
- A. t. vandenburghi (Dickerson, 1919)
- A. t. variolosa (Cope, 1892)
- A. t. vivida (Walker, 1981)

Nota bene: A trinomial authority in parentheses indicates that the subspecies was originally described in a genus other than Aspidoscelis.

=== Subspecies etymology ===
The subspecific names, dickersonae, stejnegeri, and vandenburghi, are in honor of American herpetologists Mary Cynthia Dickerson, Leonhard Stejneger, and John Van Denburgh, respectively.

== Description ==
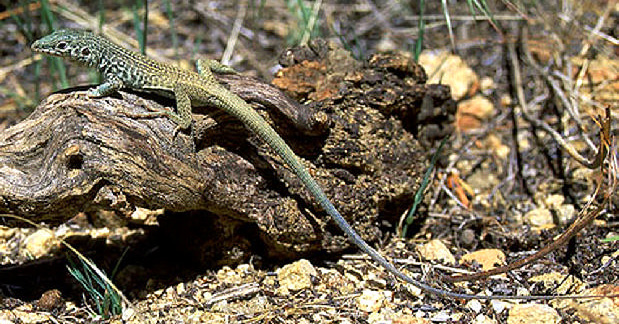
A. t. multiscutatus

The western whiptail has a long and slender body, small grainy scales on its back, and larger rectangular scales on its belly. The upper side often has light stripes, and the throat can be pinkish or somewhat orange in adults. The maximum snout-to-vent length (SVL) is 102 mm (about 4 inches), and maximum total length (including tail) is 305 mm (about 12 inches). Hatchlings are orange-yellow with dark brown-black spots or stripes.

== Distribution and habitat ==
The western whiptail is widespread throughout northern Mexico and the western United States. In the US it can be found in the states of Arizona, California, Colorado, Idaho, Nevada, New Mexico, Oregon, and Utah. It is found in hot dry regions, typically with sparse foliage. It can live in woodland, chaparral, riparian areas, or desert. Desert subspecies prefer habitat with vegetation such as sagebrush or shadscale, and rely on burrows to escape the desert heat.

In the northern parts of its range, the western whiptail usually emerges from hibernation in May, and most adults aestivate during the midsummer months, but in the south it is active from April through late August. The seasonal period of activity is therefore considerably shorter in the north. Daily periods of activity are of similar duration from north to south, although the time of emergence tends to be later in northern areas.

== Behaviour and ecology ==
=== Reproduction ===
The western whiptail's chromosomes show that it is polyploid. It is also a bisexual species, containing both males and females, unlike other species of Aspidoscelis which are all-female. Usually in the northern end of its range, mating occurs in the first half of June, and females begin to lay eggs in late June. The eggs usually begin hatching by mid-August. Females will only lay one clutch (number of eggs laid at a single time) per year. At the southern end of its range, however, females will begin to lay eggs as early as May, and the eggs will usually hatch as early as mid-June. In the southern end of its range, females may also lay two clutches per year instead of just one.

=== Diet ===
The western whiptail mostly eats insects, spiders, scorpions, lepidopterans, crickets, grasshoppers, and beetles. They use their jaws instead of their tongue to capture their prey.

=== Tail drop ===
When being attacked by a predator, the western whiptail will drop its tail. The muscles in the tail will continue contracting causing the tail to flop around. This is used to distract the predator from the lizard. However, this is a last ditch effort. It is very stressful for the lizard. It takes a lot of energy to regrow the tail, and the lizard loses a lot of stored food. This is a tactic often used when the lizard is threatened by a domestic or feral cat.
