= Plateau spotted whiptail =

Conservation status
- Least Concern (IUCN 3.1)

Scientific classification
- Kingdom: Animalia
- Phylum: Chordata
- Class: Reptilia
- Order: Squamata
- Suborder: Lacertoidea
- Family: Teiidae
- Genus: Aspidoscelis
- Species: A. septemvittatus

Binomial name
- Aspidoscelis septemvittatus Cope, 1892

Synonyms
- Cnemidophorus sackii semifasciatus Smith & Taylor, 1950; Cnemidophorus gularis septemvittatus Maslin & Secoy, 1986; Aspidoscelis gularis septemvittata Reeder, 2002

Species of lizard

The plateau spotted whiptail (Aspidoscelis septemvittatus) is a species of lizard found in the southern United States in Texas, and in northern Mexico in Chihuahua and Coahuila. It is known to hybridize with the Eastern Spotted Whiptail, Cnemidophorus gularis, but is considered to be a distinct species due to phenotypic characteristics.

== Description ==
The Plateau spotted whiptail grows from 8 to 12.5 inches. It has an overall dark green, dark brown or black coloration with 6-7 cream colored stripes that run down the body from head to tail, sometimes with white spotting between stripes. Their underside is typically white or pale blue, and females often have an orange throat. They have a slender body, with a tail that is nearly three times their body length.

== Behavior ==
Like other species of whiptail lizard, the Plateau spotted whiptail is diurnal and insectivorous. They are wary, energetic, and fast moving, darting for cover if approached. It is found primarily in semi-arid canyonlands and rocky desert foothills. Breeding takes place in the spring, with females laying eggs in the mid summer, which hatch six to eight weeks later.
