= Charles Herbert Lowe =

American biologist and herpetologist

Charles Herbert Lowe, Jr. (April 16, 1920 – September 13, 2002) was an American biologist and herpetologist.

Lowe was born in Los Angeles, California. After college he served during World War II as a U.S. Navy Ensign in the Pacific. In 1946, he enrolled at UCLA, where he received a Ph.D. in 1950. He then went to the University of Arizona in Tucson, Arizona, where he became a professor of ecology and evolutionary biology.

His interests focused on the desert fauna, especially of the Sonoran Desert. He did many extensive studies, and in 1964 published The Vertebrates of Arizona. His research in the 1960s established the parthenogenetic reproduction of many whiptail lizard species, and also discovered that the desert pupfish can tolerate temperatures up to 44 °C (112 °F) and extremely low oxygen levels. He discovered twenty new species and subspecies and published 136 scientific articles and books.

Lowe is commemorated in the scientific names of three reptiles: Lepidophyma lowei, Thamnophis sirtalis lowei, and Uta lowei.

Lowe was married and had two children. He died in 2002 after a long period of declining health.
