= List of reptiles of Northern America =

This is a checklist of American reptiles found in Northern America, based primarily on publications by the Society for the Study of Amphibians and Reptiles (SSAR). It includes all species of Bermuda, Canada, Greenland, Saint Pierre and Miquelon, and the United States including recently introduced species such as chameleons, the Nile monitor, and the Burmese python. Subspecies are listed only in a few cases. The information about range and status of almost all of these species can be found also in the IUCN Red List of Threatened Species site.

(I) = Introduced species

Summary of 2006 IUCN Red List categories.

Conservation status – IUCN Red List of Threatened Species:

- EX – extinct, EW – extinct in the wild
- CR – critically endangered, EN – endangered, VU – vulnerable
- NT – near threatened, LC – least concern
- DD – data deficient, NE – not evaluated
- (v. 2013.2, the data is current as of March 5, 2014)

and Endangered Species Act:

- E – endangered, T – threatened
- XN, XE – experimental non-essential or essential population
- E(S/A), T(S/A) – endangered or threatened due to similarity of appearance
- (the data is current as of March 28, 2014)

== Order: Crocodilia ==
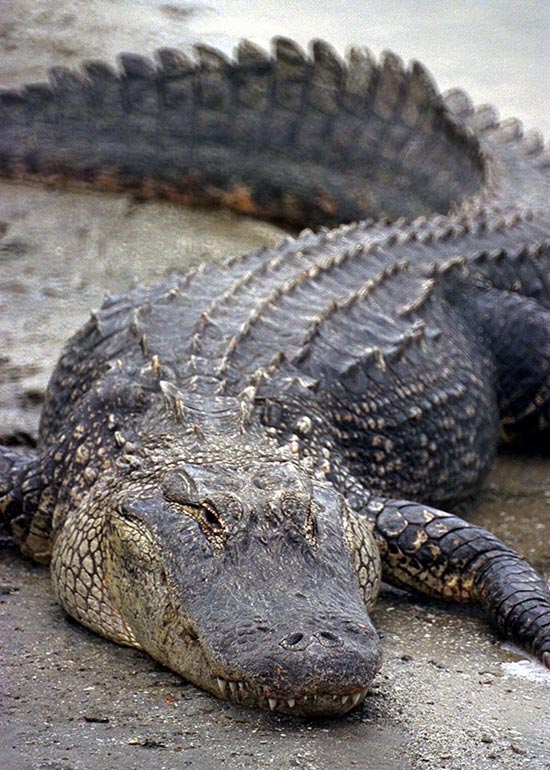
American alligator (Alligator mississippiensis)

=== Family: Alligatoridae ===
Alligators

- American alligator (Alligator mississippiensis) LC T(S/A)
- Spectacled caiman (Caiman crocodilus) (I) LC

=== Family: Crocodylidae ===
Subfamily: Crocodylinae

Crocodiles

- American crocodile (Crocodylus acutus) VU E (FL: T only)

== Order: Testudines (turtles) ==
=== Suborder: Pleurodira ===
==== Family: Podocnemididae (side-necked turtles) ====
- Yellow-spotted Amazon River turtle (Podocnemis unifilis) (I) VU (Note: Species not listed by SSAR)

=== Suborder: Cryptodira ===
==== Family: Testudinidae (tortoises) ====
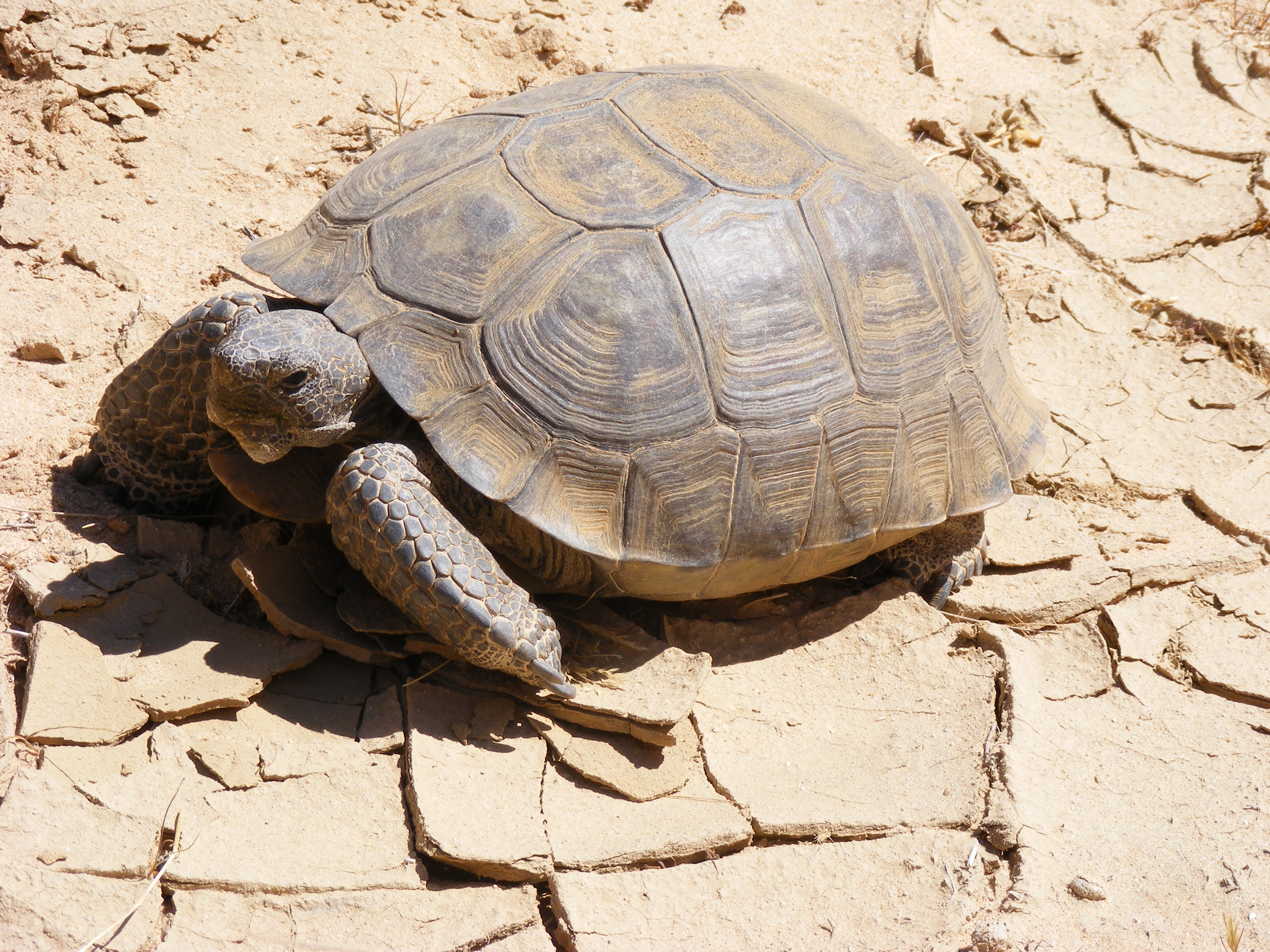
Mohave Desert tortoise (Gopherus agassizii)

Gopher tortoises

- Gopher tortoise (Gopherus polyphemus) VU T
- Berlandier's tortoise (Gopherus berlandieri) LC
- Bolson tortoise (Gopherus flavomarginatus) VU
- Mojave Desert tortoise (Gopherus agassizii) VU T
  (AZ south and east of Colorado R.: T(S/A) only) and: (Note: Species split from this species or considered as distinct species alternatively. All these taxa occur in the area of interest, including the one on the left.)
  - Sonoran Desert tortoise (Gopherus morafkai)

Typical tortoises

- Indian star tortoise (Geochelone elegans) (I)

==== Family: Emydidae ====
Subfamily: Emydinae

Pond turtles

- Species split from former western pond turtle (Actinemys marmorata) VU:
  - Northwestern pond turtle (Actinemys (marmorata) marmorata) (Note: Subspecies elevated to full species rank)
  - Southwestern pond turtle (Actinemys (marmorata) pallida)
- Spotted turtle (Clemmys guttata) EN
- Wood turtle (Glyptemys insculpta) EN
- Bog turtle (Glyptemys muhlenbergii) CR T
  (GA, NC, SC, TN, VA: T(S/A) only)

Blanding's turtle

- Blanding's turtle (Emydoidea blandingii) EN

Box turtles

- Eastern box turtle (Terrapene carolina) VU and:
  - Florida box turtle (Terrapene (carolina) bauri)
  - Three-toed box turtle (Terrapene triunguis) (Note: Species not listed in the SSAR North American Species Names Database.)
- Ornate box turtle (Terrapene ornata) NT

Subfamily: Deirochelyinae

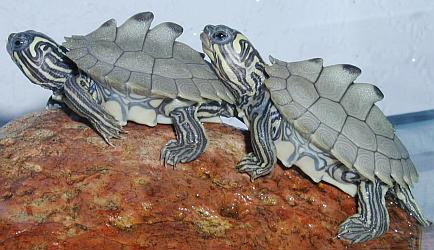
Black-knobbed map turtle (Graptemys nigrinoda) hatchlings

Sliders

- Pond slider (Trachemys scripta) LC
- Mexican plateau slider (Trachemys gaigeae) VU
- Jamaican slider (Trachemys terrapen) (I) VU

Painted turtles

- Painted turtle (Chrysemys picta) LC and:
- Southern painted turtle (Chrysemys dorsalis)

Chicken turtles

- Chicken turtle (Deirochelys reticularia)

Map turtles

- Barbour's map turtle (Graptemys barbouri) VU
- Cagle's map turtle (Graptemys caglei) EN
- Escambia map turtle (Graptemys ernsti) NT
- Yellow-blotched map turtle (Graptemys flavimaculata) VU T
- Northern map turtle (Graptemys geographica) LC
- Pascagoula map turtle (Graptemys gibbonsi) EN and:
  - Pearl River map turtle (Graptemys pearlensis) EN
- Black-knobbed map turtle (Graptemys nigrinoda) LC
- Ringed map turtle (Graptemys oculifera) VU T
- Species split from the Ouachita map turtle (Graptemys ouachitensis) LC:
  - Ouachita map turtle (Graptemys (ouachitensis) ouachitensis)
  - Sabine map turtle (Graptemys (ouachitensis) sabinensis)
- False map turtle (Graptemys pseudogeographica) LC
- Alabama map turtle (Graptemys pulchra) NT
- Texas map turtle (Graptemys versa) LC

Diamond-backed terrapin

- Diamond-backed terrapin (Malaclemys terrapin) VU

Redbelly turtles and cooters

- Alabama red-bellied cooter (Pseudemys alabamensis) EN E
- River cooter (Pseudemys concinna) LC and:
  - Florida cooter (Pseudemys (concinna) floridana)
  - Suwannee cooter (Pseudemys suwanniensis)
- Rio Grande cooter (Pseudemys gorzugi) NT
- Florida red-bellied cooter (Pseudemys nelsoni) LC
- Peninsula cooter (Pseudemys peninsularis) LC
- Northern red-bellied cooter (Pseudemys rubriventris) NT (Plymouth red-bellied turtle (P. r. bangsi): E)
- Texas cooter (Pseudemys texana) LC

==== Family: Cheloniidae ====
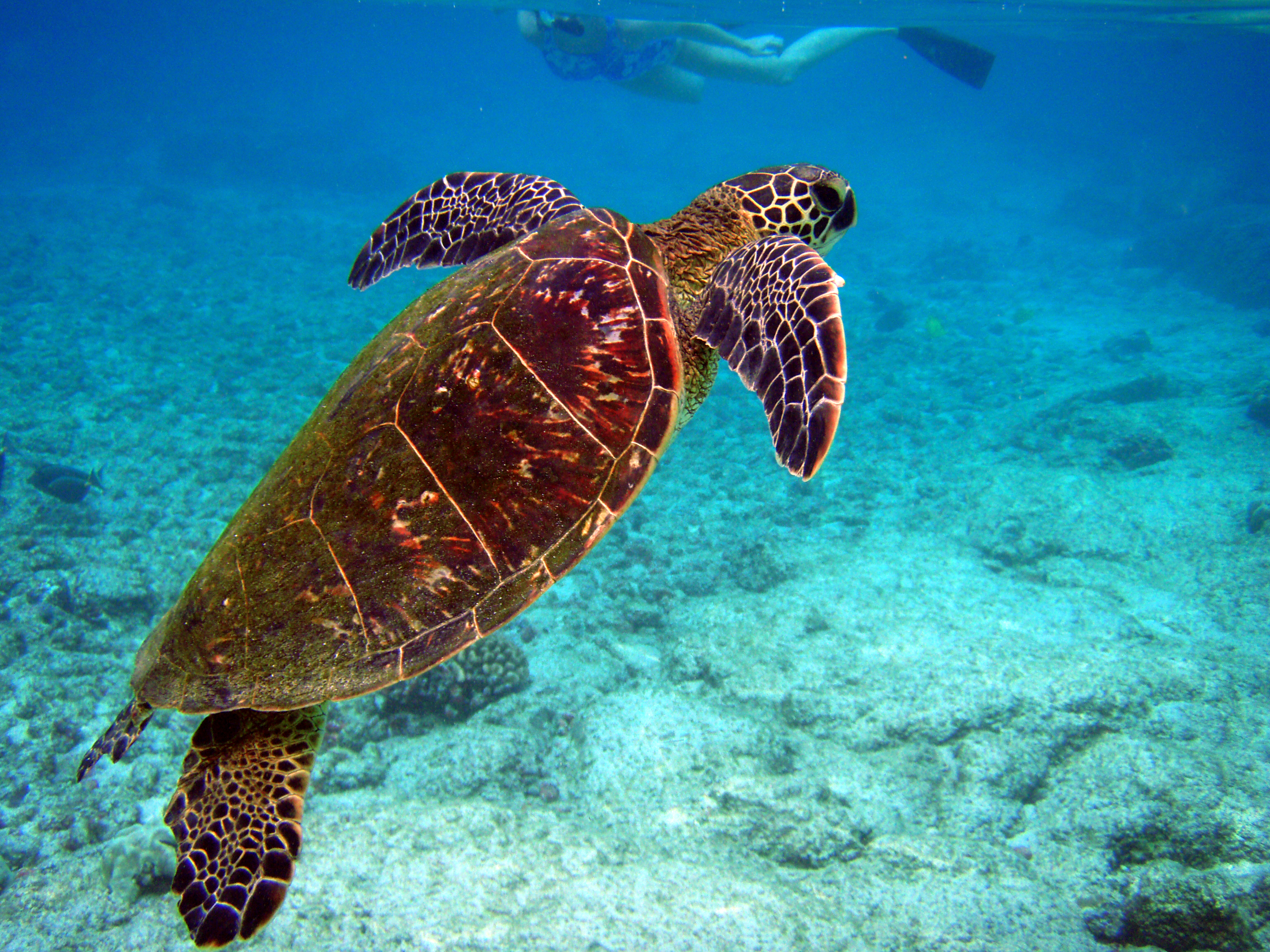
Green sea turtle (Chelonia mydas)

- Olive ridley sea turtle (Lepidochelys olivacea) VU T
- Loggerhead sea turtle (Caretta caretta) VU (North Pacific: E, Northwest Atlantic: T)
- Kemp's ridley sea turtle (Lepidochelys kempii) CR E
- Green sea turtle (Chelonia mydas) EN T
  (Hawaiian subpopulation: LC, Breeding colony populations in FL: E)
- Hawksbill sea turtle (Eretmochelys imbricata) CR E

==== Family: Dermochelyidae ====
- Leatherback sea turtle (Dermochelys coriacea) VU E
  (East Pacific Ocean subpopulation – i.e. Hawaiian Is.: CR, West Pacific Ocean subpopulation: CR, Northwest Atlantic Ocean subpopulation: EN)

==== Family: Chelydridae ====
Snapping turtles

- Snapping turtle (Chelydra serpentina) LC

Alligator snapping turtles

- Species split from the alligator snapping turtle (Macrochelys temminckii) VU:
  - Alligator snapping turtle (Macrochelys temminckii) including:
    - Apalachicola alligator snapping turtle (Macrochelys apalachicolae) (Note: Species not recognized by SSAR) (currently not recognized)
  - Suwannee alligator snapping turtle (Macrochelys suwanniensis)

==== Family: Kinosternidae ====
Mud turtles

- Arizona mud turtle (Kinosternon (flavescens) stejnegeri)
  (formerly Kinosternon arizonense LC)
- Striped mud turtle (Kinosternon baurii) LC
- Yellow mud turtle (Kinosternon flavescens) LC
- Rough-footed mud turtle (Kinosternon hirtipes) LC
- Sonora mud turtle (Kinosternon sonoriense) NT
- Species split from the eastern mud turtle (Kinosternon subrubrum) LC:
  - Eastern mud turtle (Kinosternon subrubrum)
  - Florida mud turtle (Kinosternon (subrubrum) steindachneri)

Musk turtles

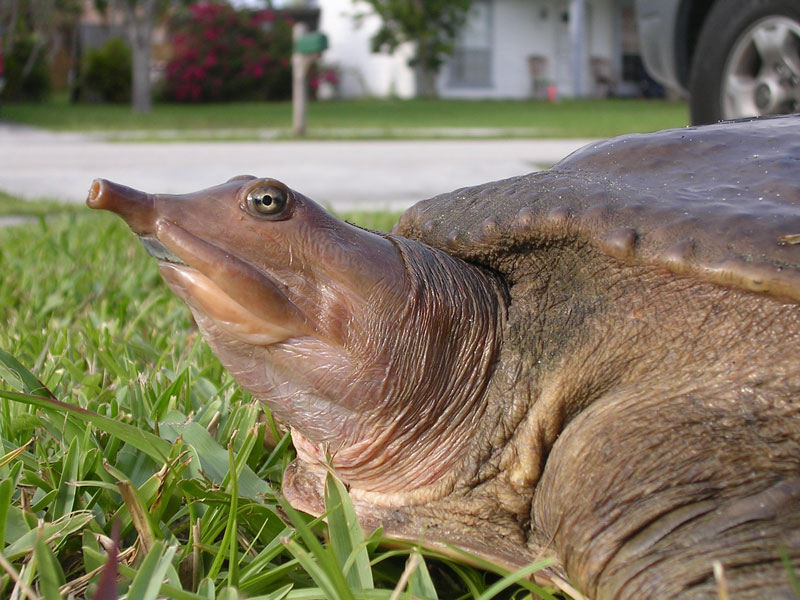
Spiny softshell (Apalone spinifera)

- Razor-backed musk turtle (Sternotherus carinatus) LC
- Flattened musk turtle (Sternotherus depressus) CR T
- Loggerhead musk turtle (Sternotherus minor) LC and:
  - Stripe-necked musk turtle (Sternotherus (minor) peltifer) (Note: Subspecies elevated to full species rank) (split from S. minor)
- Intermediate musk turtle (Sternotherus intermedius)
- Eastern musk turtle (Sternotherus odoratus) LC

Giant musk turtles

- Pacific Coast giant musk turtle (Staurotypus salvinii) (I) NT

==== Family: Trionychidae (softshells) ====
- Florida softshell (Apalone ferox) LC
- Smooth softshell (Apalone mutica) LC
- Spiny softshell (Apalone spinifera) LC
- Wattle-necked softshell (Palea steindachneri) (I) CR (Hawaii only)
- Chinese softshell (Pelodiscus sinensis) (I) VU (Hawaii only)

== Order: Squamata (scaled reptiles) ==
=== Suborder: Iguania ===
==== Family: Agamidae (agamas) ====
Subfamily: Agaminae

- Peters's rock agama (Agama picticauda) (I)
- Indochinese bloodsucker (Calotes mystaceus) (I)
- Variable bloodsucker (Calotes versicolor) (I) LC

Subfamily: Leiolepidinae

- Butterfly lizard (Leiolepis belliana) (I)
- Red-banded butterfly lizard (Leiolepis rubritaeniata) (I)

==== Family: Chamaeleonidae (chameleons) ====
Subfamily: Chamaeleoninae

- Veiled chameleon (Chamaeleo calyptratus) (I) LC
- Jackson's chameleon (Trioceros jacksonii) (I)
- Oustalet's chameleon (Furcifer oustaleti) (I) LC
- Panther chameleon (Furcifer pardalis) (I) LC

==== Family: Crotaphytidae (collared and leopard lizards) ====
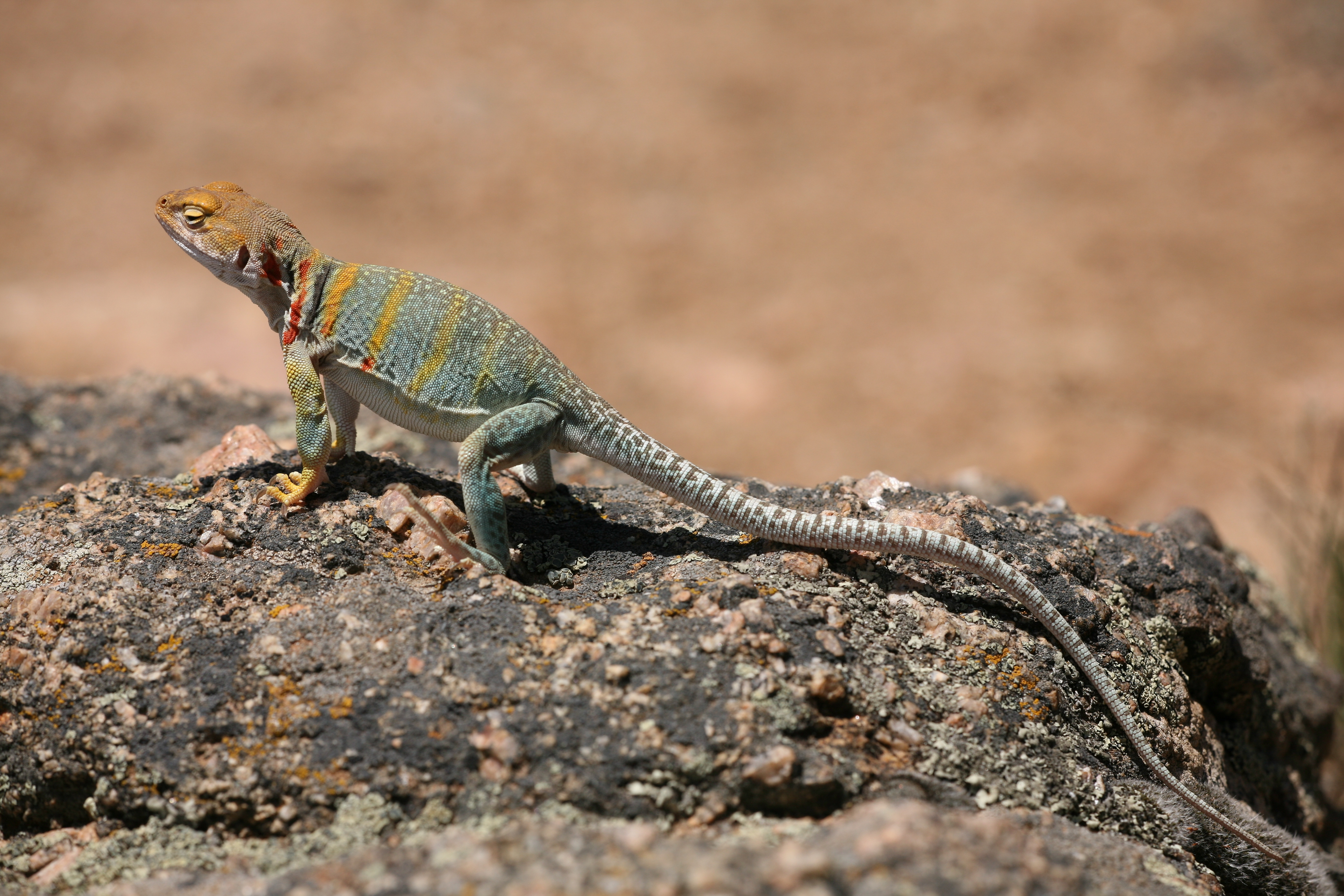
Eastern collared lizard (Crotaphytus collaris)

Collared lizards

- Great Basin collared lizard (Crotaphytus bicinctores) LC
- Eastern collared lizard (Crotaphytus collaris) LC
- Sonoran collared lizard (Crotaphytus nebrius) LC
- Reticulate collared lizard (Crotaphytus reticulatus) VU
- Baja California collared lizard (Crotaphytus vestigium) LC

Leopard lizards

- Cope's leopard lizard (Gambelia copeii) LC
- Blunt-nosed leopard lizard (Gambelia sila) EN E
- Long-nosed leopard lizard (Gambelia wislizenii) LC

==== Family: Iguanidae (iguanas) ====
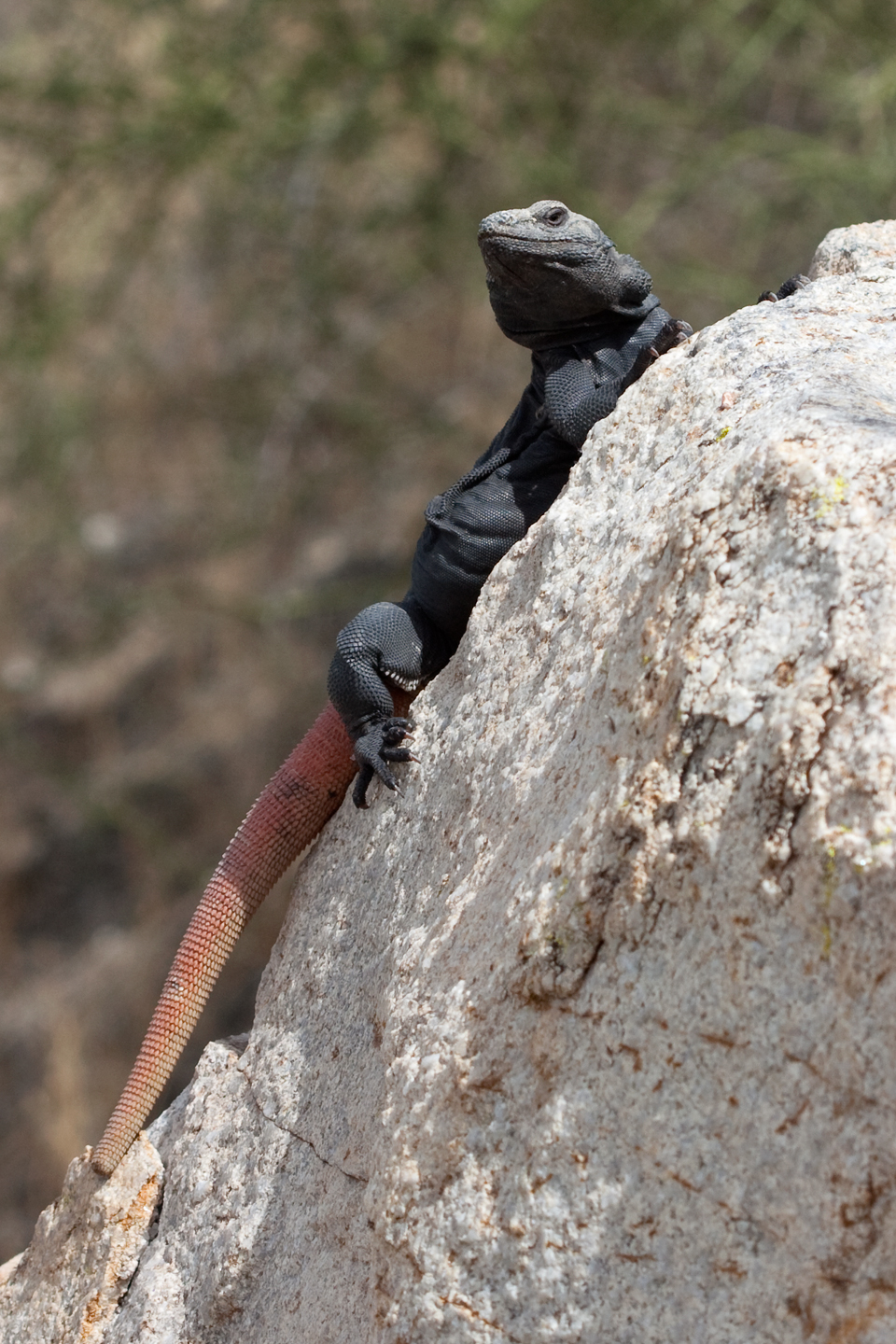
Common chuckwalla (Sauromalus ater)

- San Esteban spinytail iguana (Ctenosaura conspicuosa) (I)
- Sonoran spiny-tailed iguana (Ctenosaura macrolopha) (I)
- Mexican spiny-tailed iguana (Ctenosaura pectinata) (I)
- Gray's spiny-tailed iguana (Ctenosaura similis) (I) LC
- Desert iguana (Dipsosaurus dorsalis) LC
- Green iguana (Iguana iguana) (I)

Chuckwallas

- Common chuckwalla (Sauromalus ater) LC

==== Family: Phrynosomatidae ====
Zebratail lizards

- Zebra-tailed lizard (Callisaurus draconoides) LC

Greater earless lizards

- Greater earless lizard (Cophosaurus texanus) LC

Lesser earless lizards

- Species split from the spot-tailed earless lizard (Holbrookia lacerata) NT:
  - Northern spot-tailed earless lizard (Holbrookia lacerata) (Note: Subspecies elevated to full species rank)
  - Southern spot-tailed earless lizard (Holbrookia (lacerata) subcaudalis)
- Species split from the common lesser earless lizard (Holbrookia maculata):
  - Common lesser earless lizard (Holbrookia maculata) LC and:
    - Speckled earless lizard (Holbrookia (maculata) approximans) (currently not recognized, split from H. maculata)
  - Elegant earless lizard (Holbrookia elegans) LC
- Keeled earless lizard (Holbrookia propinqua) LC

Banded rock lizards

- Mearns's rock lizard (Petrosaurus mearnsi) LC

Horned lizards

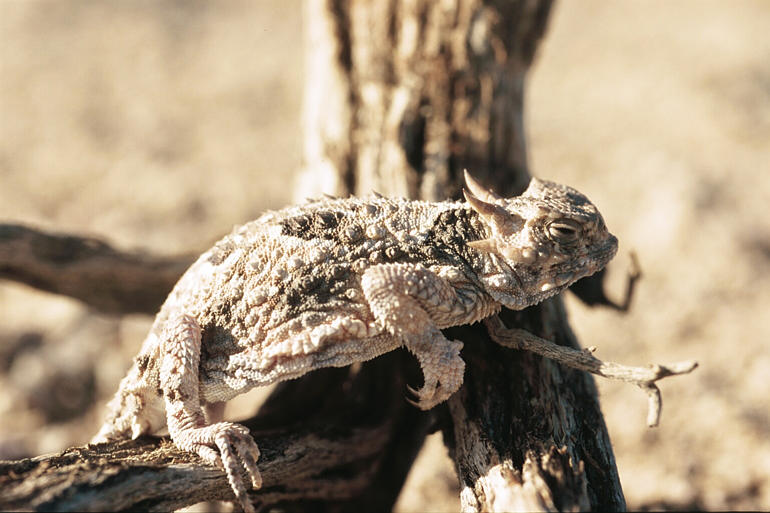
Desert horned lizard (Phrynosoma platyrhinos)

- Texas horned lizard (Phrynosoma cornutum) LC and:
  - Blainville's horned lizard (Phrynosoma blainvillii)
- Short-horned lizards (Phrynosoma douglasii species complex):
  - Pygmy short-horned lizard (Phrynosoma douglasii) LC
  - Species treated by SSAR as subspecies of the greater short-horned lizard (Phrynosoma hernandesi) LC
    - Hernandez's short-horned lizard (Phrynosoma hernandesi)
    - Plains short-horned lizard (Phrynosoma brevirostris)
    - New Mexico short-horned lizard (Phrynosoma ornatissimum)
    - Baur's short-horned lizard (Phrynosoma bauri)
    - San Luis Valley short-horned lizard (Phrynosoma diminutum)
- Desert horned lizard (Phrynosoma platyrhinos) LC and:
  - Goode's horned lizard (Phrynosoma goodei)
- Flat-tail horned lizard (Phrynosoma mcallii) NT
- Round-tailed horned lizard (Phrynosoma modestum) LC
- Regal horned lizard (Phrynosoma solare) LC

Spiny lizards

- Dunes sagebrush lizard (Sceloporus arenicolus) VU
- Desert spiny lizard (Sceloporus magister) LC and:
  - Twin-spotted spiny lizard (Sceloporus bimaculosus)
  - Yellow-backed spiny lizard (Sceloporus uniformis)
- Clark's spiny lizard (Sceloporus clarkii) LC
- Species split from the eastern fence lizard (Sceloporus undulatus) LC:
  - Eastern fence lizard (Sceloporus undulatus)
  - Prairie lizard (Sceloporus consobrinus)
  - Southwestern fence lizard (Sceloporus cowlesi)
  - Plateau fence lizard (Sceloporus tristichus)
- Rough-scaled lizard (Sceloporus serrifer) LC and:
  - Blue spiny lizard (Sceloporus cyanogenys)
- Common sagebrush lizard (Sceloporus graciosus) LC and:
  - Southern sagebrush lizard (Sceloporus (graciosus) vandenburgianus) LC (split from S. graciosus)
- Graphic spiny lizard (Sceloporus grammicus) LC
- Yarrow's spiny lizard (Sceloporus jarrovii) LC
- Canyon lizard (Sceloporus merriami) LC
- Western fence lizard (Sceloporus occidentalis) LC and:
- Island fence lizard (Sceloporus becki) (split from S. occidentalis)
- Texas spiny lizard (Sceloporus olivaceus) LC
- Granite spiny lizard (Sceloporus orcutti) LC
- Crevice spiny lizard (Sceloporus poinsettii) LC
- Slevin's bunchgrass lizard (Sceloporus slevini) LC
- Rose-bellied lizard (Sceloporus variabilis) LC, but only:
  - Texas rose-bellied lizard (Sceloporus (variabilis) marmoratus) (split from S. variabilis)
- Striped plateau lizard (Sceloporus virgatus) LC
- Florida scrub lizard (Sceloporus woodi) NT
- Ornate spiny lizard (Sceloporus ornatus) NT

Fringe-toed lizards

- Coachella fringe-toed lizard (Uma inornata) EN T
- Colorado Desert fringe-toed lizard (Uma notata) NT and:
  - Yuman fringe-toed lizard (Uma rufopunctata) NT
- Mohave fringe-toed lizard (Uma scoparia) LC
- Mohawk Dunes fringe-toed lizard (Uma thurmanae)

Tree and brush lizards

- Long-tailed brush lizard (Urosaurus graciosus) LC
- Small-scaled lizard (Urosaurus microscutatus) (formerly merged with U. nigricaudus LC)
- Ornate tree lizard (Urosaurus ornatus) LC

Side-blotched lizards

- Common sideblotched lizard (Uta stansburiana) LC

==== Family: Dactyloidae (anoles) ====
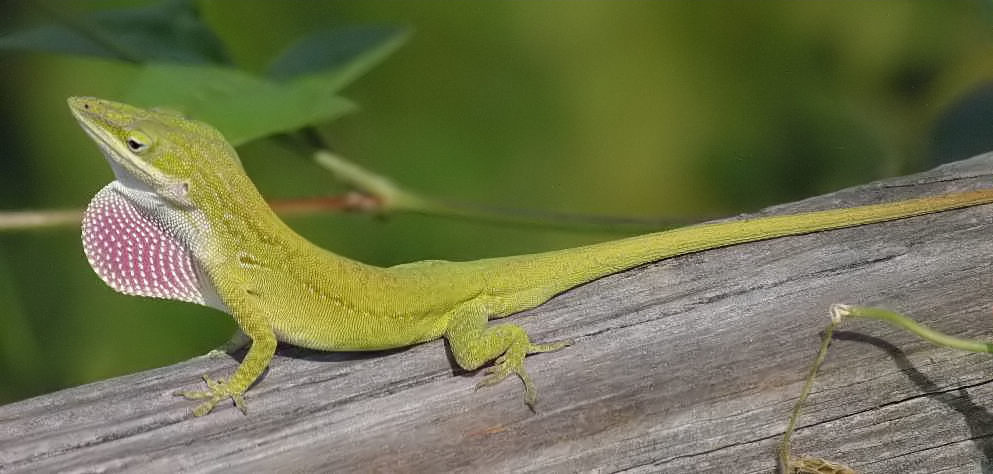
Green anole (Anolis carolinensis)

- Green anole (Anolis carolinensis) LC
- Hispaniolan green anole (Anolis chlorocyanus) (I)
- Large-headed anole (Anolis cybotes) (I)
- Knight anole (Anolis equestris) (I)
- Cuban green anole (Anolis porcatus) (I)
- Crested anole (Anolis cristatellus) (I)
- Species split from the bark anole (Anolis distichus):
  - Bark anole (Anolis distichus) (I) (Note: Additional native status is an unresolved issue)
  - Anolis (distichus) dominicensis (I)
  - Anolis (distichus) ignigularis (I)
- Allison's anole (Anolis allisoni) (I)
- Comb anole (Anolis ferreus) (I)
- Jamaican giant anole (Anolis garmani) (I)
- Brown anole (Anolis sagrei) (I)
- Saint Vincent's bush anole (Anolis trinitatis) (I)

==== Family: Polychrotidae ====
- Many-colored bush anole (Polychrus marmoratus) probably (I)

==== Family: Corytophanidae (casquehead lizards) ====
- Brown basilisk (Basiliscus vittatus) (I)

==== Family: Leiocephalidae (curly-tailed lizards) ====
- Northern curly-tailed lizard (Leiocephalus carinatus) (I) LC
- Red-sided curly-tailed lizard (Leiocephalus schreibersii) (I) LC

=== Suborder: Gekkota ===
==== Family: Gekkonidae (geckos) ====
Subfamily: Gekkoninae

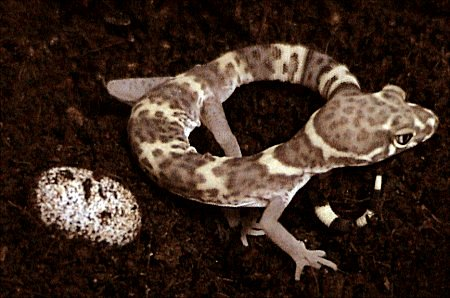
Texas banded gecko (Coleonyx brevis)

- Moorish gecko (Tarentola mauritanica) (I) LC
- Ringed wall gecko (Tarentola annularis) (I)
- Common house gecko (Hemidactylus frenatus) (I) LC
- Indo-Pacific house gecko (Hemidactylus garnotii) (I) (Note: Unisexual)
- Wood slave (Hemidactylus mabouia) (I)
- Sri Lankan spotted house gecko (Hemidactylus parvimaculatus) (I)
- Asian flat-tailed house gecko (Hemidactylus platyurus) (I)
- Mediterranean gecko (Hemidactylus turcicus) (I) LC
- Indo-Pacific tree gecko (Hemiphyllodactylus typus) (I) (Hawaii only)
- Peninsula leaf-toed gecko (Phyllodactylus nocticolus) LC
  (sometimes treated as subspecies of the Xantus' leaf-toed gecko (Phyllodactylus xanti) LC)
- Reef gecko (Sphaerodactylus notatus) LC
- Ocellated gecko (Sphaerodactylus argus) (I)
- Ashy gecko (Sphaerodactylus elegans) (I)
- Gray gecko (Sphaerodactylus cinereus) VU
- Bibron's sand gecko (Chondrodactylus bibronii) (I)
- Rough-tailed gecko (Cyrtopodion scabrum) (I) LC
- Mutilating gecko (Gehyra mutilata) (I) (Hawaii only)
- Golden gecko (Gekko badenii) (I) EN
- Tokay gecko (Gekko gecko) (I)
- Yellow-headed gecko (Gonatodes albogularis) (I)
- Mourning gecko (Lepidodactylus lugubris) (I)
- Madagascan giant day gecko (Phelsuma grandis) (I) LC
- Orange-spotted day gecko (Phelsuma guimbeaui) (I) (Hawaii only)
- Gold dust day gecko (Phelsuma laticauda) (I) LC

Subfamily: Eublepharinae

Banded geckos

- Texas banded gecko (Coleonyx brevis) LC
- Reticulate banded gecko (Coleonyx reticulatus) LC
- Switak's banded gecko (Coleonyx switaki) LC
- Western banded gecko (Coleonyx variegatus) LC

=== Suborder: Autarchoglossa ===
==== Family: Lacertidae (wall or true lizards) ====
Subfamily: Lacertinae

- Western green lacerta (Lacerta bilineata) (I) LC
- Common wall lizard (Podarcis muralis) (I) LC
- Italian wall lizard (Podarcis siculus) (I) LC

==== Family: Scincidae (skinks) ====
Subfamily: Scincinae

- Coal skink (Plestiodon anthracinus) LC
- Mountain skink (Plestiodon callicephalus) LC
- Mole skink (Plestiodon egregius) LC (blue-tailed mole skink (P. e. lividus): T)
- Five-lined skink (Plestiodon fasciatus) LC
- Gilbert's skink (Plestiodon gilberti) LC
- Southeastern five-lined skink (Plestiodon inexpectatus) LC
- Broad-headed skink (Plestiodon laticeps) LC
- Many-lined skink (Plestiodon multivirgatus) LC
- Great Plains skink (Plestiodon obsoletus) LC
- Prairie skink (Plestiodon septentrionalis) LC
- Western skink (Plestiodon skiltonianus) LC
- Four-lined skink (Plestiodon tetragrammus) LC
- Florida sand skink (Plestiodon reynoldsi) VU T
- Ocellated skink (Chalcides ocellatus) (I)

Subfamily: Lygosominae

- Brown mabuya (Mabuya multifasciata) (I)
- Little brown skink (Scincella lateralis) LC
- Pacific snake-eyed skink (Cryptoblepharus poecilopleurus) (I) (Hawaii only)
- Copper-tailed skink (Emoia cyanura) (I) (Hawaii only)
- Azure-tailed skink (Emoia impar) (I) LC (Hawaii only)
- Plague skink (Lampropholis delicata) (I) (Hawaii only)
- Moth skink (Lipinia noctua) (I) (Hawaii only)
- African five-lined skink (Trachylepis quinquetaeniata) (I)

==== Family: Anguidae ====
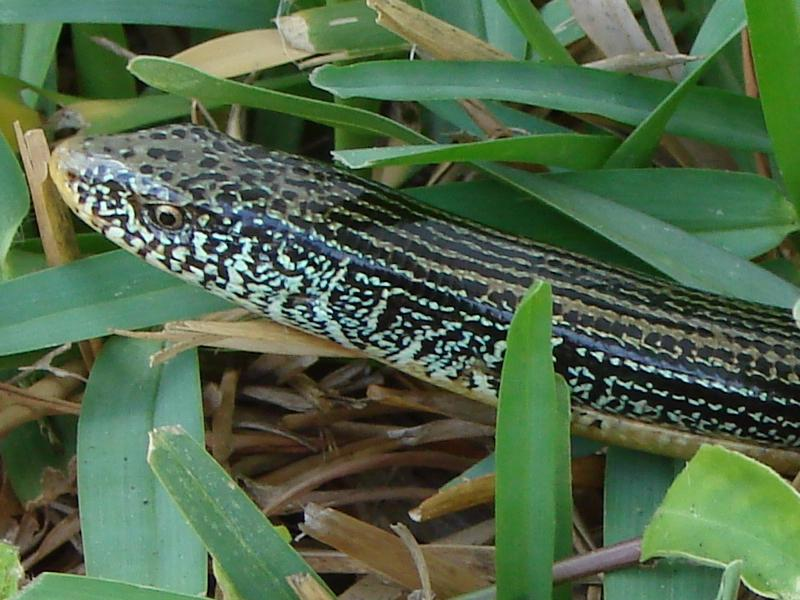
Eastern glass lizard (Ophisaurus ventralis)

Subfamily: Anguinae

Glass lizards

- Slender glass lizard (Ophisaurus attenuatus) LC
- Island glass lizard (Ophisaurus compressus) LC
- Mimic glass lizard (Ophisaurus mimicus) LC
- Eastern glass lizard (Ophisaurus ventralis) LC

Subfamily: Gerrhonotinae

Western alligator lizards

- Northern alligator lizard (Elgaria coerulea) LC
- Madrean alligator lizard (Elgaria kingii) LC
- Southern alligator lizard (Elgaria multicarinata) LC
- Panamint alligator lizard (Elgaria panamintina) VU

Eastern alligator lizards

- Texas alligator lizard (Gerrhonotus infernalis) LC

==== Family: Anniellidae (American legless lizards) ====
California legless lizards

- Species split from the California legless lizard (Anniella pulchra) LC:
  - Temblor legless lizard (Anniella alexanderae)
  - Big Spring legless lizard (Anniella campi)
  - Bakersfield legless lizard (Anniella grinnelli)
  - Northern legless lizard (Anniella pulchra)
  - San Diegan legless lizard (Anniella stebbinsi)

==== Family: Helodermatidae (Gila monsters) ====
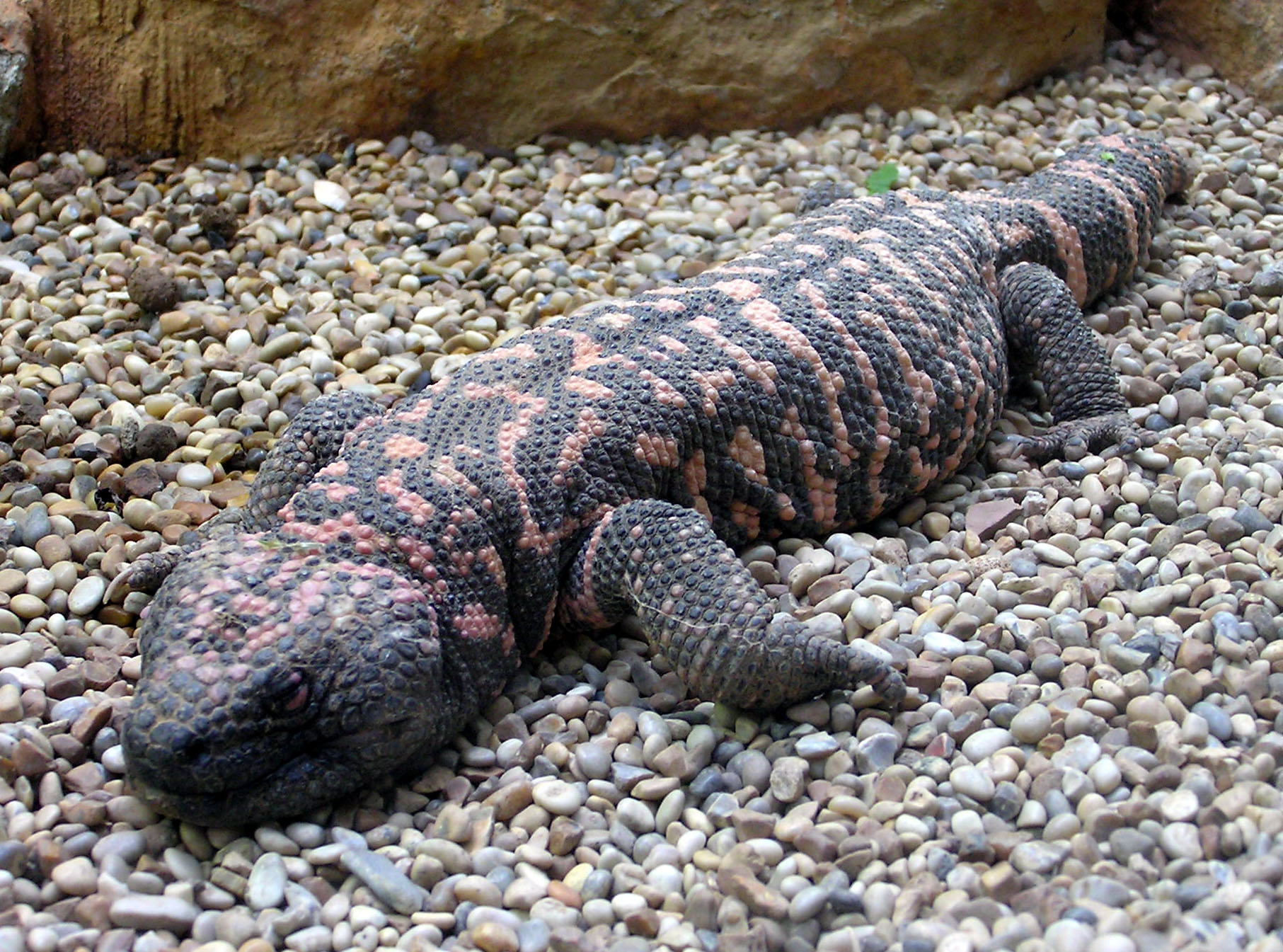
Gila monster at the Bristol Zoo

- Gila monster (Heloderma suspectum) NT

==== Family: Teiidae (tegus or whiptails) ====
- Giant ameiva (Ameiva ameiva) (I)
- Dusky giant ameiva (Ameiva praesignis) (I)
- Species split from the canyon spotted whiptail (Aspidoscelis burti) LC:
  - Giant spotted whiptail (Aspidoscelis (burti) stictogramma)
  - Red-backed whiptail (Aspidoscelis xanthonota)
- Chihuahuan spotted whiptail (Aspidoscelis exsanguis) LC
- Common spotted whiptail (Aspidoscelis gularis) LC
- Orange-throated whiptail (Aspidoscelis hyperythra) LC
- Species split from Aspidoscelis inornata:
  - Little striped whiptail (Aspidoscelis inornata) LC (diploid) and:
    - Little white whiptail (Aspidoscelis (inornata) gypsi) VU (Note: Subspecies elevated to full species rank) (split from A. inornata)
    - Pai striped whiptail (Aspidoscelis (inornata) pai) LC (split from A. inornata)
    - Arizona striped whiptail (Aspidoscelis (inornata) arizonae) NT (split from A. inornata)
  - Plateau striped whiptail (Aspidoscelis velox) LC (triploid)
- Neaves' whiptail (Aspidoscelis neavesi) (Note: A. exsanguis × A. inornata, generated in the laboratory, not known to occur in the wild)
- Laredo striped whiptail (Aspidoscelis laredoensis) LC
- Marbled whiptail (Aspidoscelis marmorata
- Giant whiptail (Aspidoscelis motaguae) (I) LC
- New Mexico whiptail (Aspidoscelis neomexicana) LC
- Aspidoscelis tesselata complex:
  - Common checkered whiptail (Aspidoscelis tesselata) LC (diploid, former A. grahamii)) and:
    - Gray checkered whiptail (Aspidoscelis dixoni) NT (split from A. tesselata)
  - Colorado checkered whiptail (Aspidoscelis neotesselata) NT (triploid, former A. tesselata)
- Plateau spotted whiptail (Aspidoscelis scalaris) LC and:
  - Big Bend spotted whiptail (Aspidoscelis (scalaris) septemvittata)
- Six-lined racerunner (Aspidoscelis sexlineata) LC
- Sonoran spotted whiptail (Aspidoscelis sonorae) LC
  - Gila spotted whiptail (Aspidoscelis flagellicauda) LC (sometimes in A. sonorae)
- Tiger whiptail (Aspidoscelis tigris) LC
- Desert grassland whiptail (Aspidoscelis uniparens) LC
- Rainbow whiptail (Cnemidophorus lemniscatus) (I)
- Argentine giant tegu (Salvator merianae) (I) LC
- Gold tegu (Tupinambis teguixin) (I)

==== Family: Xantusiidae (night lizards) ====
- Species split from the desert night lizard (Xantusia vigilis) LC:
  - Desert night lizard (Xantusia vigilis)
  - Arizona night lizard (Xantusia arizonae) LC
  - Sierra night lizard (Xantusia sierrae)
  - Wiggins' night lizard (Xantusia wigginsi)
- Bezy's night lizard (Xantusia bezyi) LC
- Sandstone night lizard (Xantusia gracilis) VU
- Granite night lizard (Xantusia henshawi) LC
- Island night lizard (Xantusia riversiana) LC T

==== Family: Varanidae (monitor lizards) ====
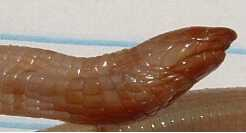
Florida wormlizard (Rhineura floridana)

- Nile monitor (Varanus niloticus) (I)
- Savannah monitor (Varanus exanthematicus) (I) LC
- Common water monitor (Varanus salvator) (I) LC

=== Suborder: Amphisbaenia ===
==== Family: Rhineuridae (North American worm lizards) ====
Worm lizards

- Florida wormlizard (Rhineura floridana) LC

=== Suborder: Serpentes ===
==== Family: Typhlopidae (blind snakes) ====
- Brahminy blindsnake (Indotyphlops braminus) (I)

==== Family: Boidae (boas) ====
Subfamily: Erycinae

Rubber and rosy boas

- Northern rubber boa (Charina bottae) LC
- Southern rubber boa (Charina umbratica)
- Three-lined boa (Lichanura trivirgata) LC and:
  - Rosy boa (Lichanura orcutti)

Subfamily: Boinae

Boas

- Boa constrictor (Boa constrictor) (I)

==== Family: Colubridae (colubrids) ====
Subfamily: Colubrinae

Racers

- North American racer (Coluber constrictor) LC

Whipsnakes

- Sonoran whipsnake (Coluber bilineatus) LC
- Coachwhip (Coluber flagellum) LC and:
  - Baja California coachwhip (Coluber fuliginosus)
- Striped racer (Coluber lateralis) LC (Alameda striped racer C. l. euryxanthus: T)
- Striped whipsnake (Coluber taeniatus) LC and:
  - Schott's whipsnake (Coluber schotti) LC

Desert rat snakes

- Baja California ratsnake (Bogertophis rosaliae) LC
- Trans-Pecos ratsnake (Bogertophis subocularis) LC

Rat snakes and fox snakes

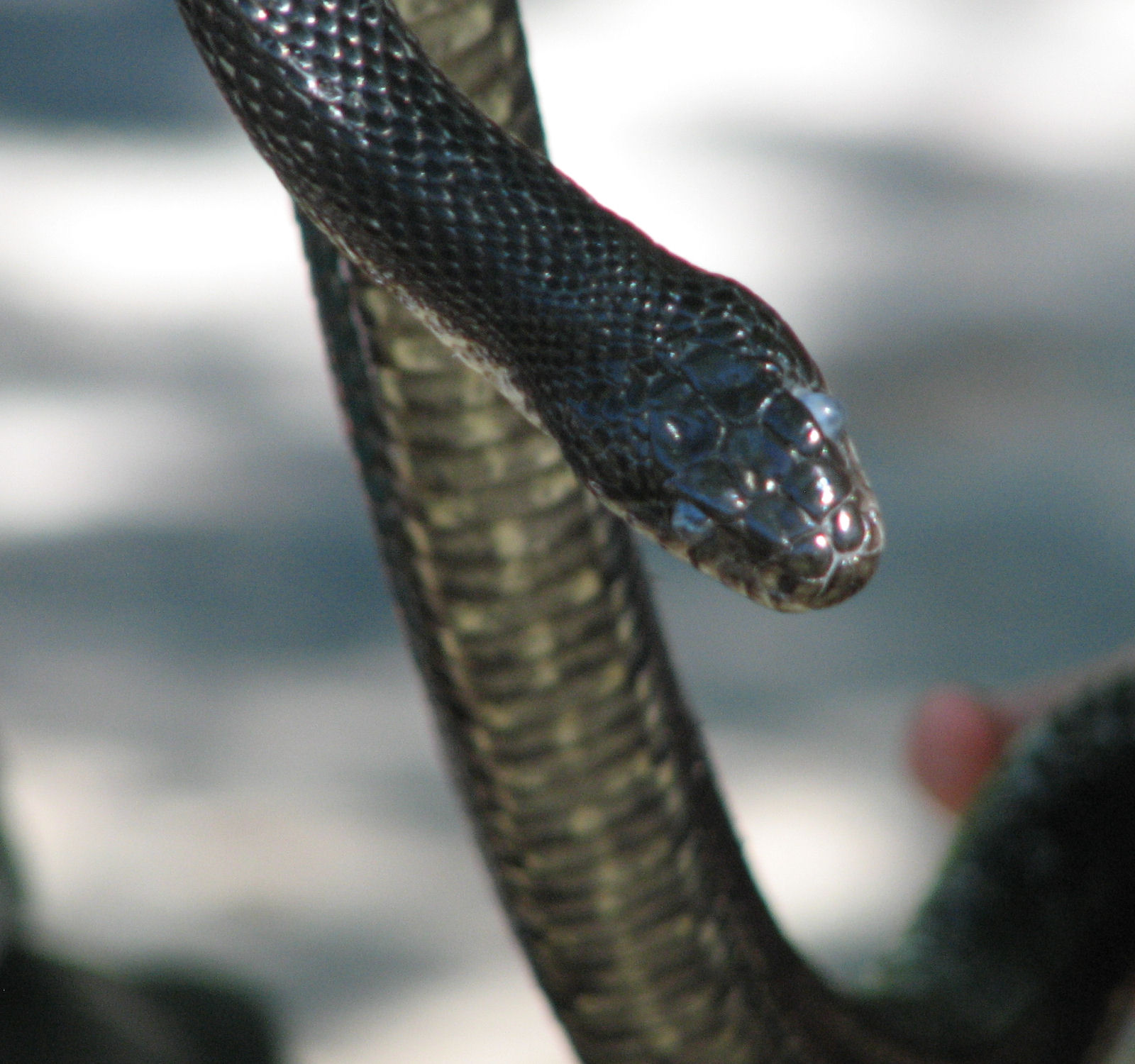
Eastern ratsnake (Pantherophis alleghaniensis)

- Species split from the black rat snake (Pantherophis obsoletus) LC:
  - Western ratsnake (Pantherophis obsoletus)
  - Eastern ratsnake (Pantherophis quadrivittatus)
  - Central ratsnake (Pantherophis alleghaniensis)
- Baird's ratsnake (Pantherophis bairdi) LC
- Great Plains ratsnake (Pantherophis emoryi) LC
- Species split from the foxsnake (Pantherophis vulpinus) LC
  - Eastern foxsnake (Pantherophis vulpinus) including:
  - Western fox snake (Pantherophis ramspotti)
- Red cornsnake (Pantherophis guttatus) LC and:
  - Slowinski's cornsnake (Pantherophis slowinskii) DD

Glossy snakes

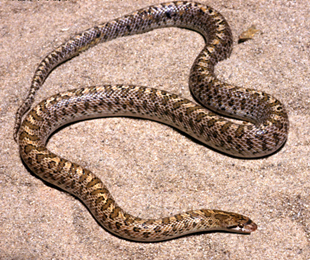
Glossy snake (Arizona elegans)

- Glossy snake (Arizona elegans) LC

Scarlet snakes

- Scarlet snake (Cemophora coccinea) LC and:
  - Texas scarletsnake (Cemophora lineri)

Sand snakes

- Variable sandsnake (Sonora straminea, syn. Chilomeniscus stramineus) LC and:
  - Banded sand snake (Sonora cincta, syn. Chilomeniscus cinctus) (split back from Ch. stramineus)

Ground snake

- Variable groundsnake (Sonora semiannulata) and:
  - Southern Texas groundsnake (Sonora (semiannulata) taylori) (split from the western groundsnake (S. semiannulata))
- Great Plains groundsnake (Sonora episcopa)

Shovel-nosed snakes

- Mohave shovel-nosed snake (Sonora occipitalis, syn. Chionactis occipitalis) LC and:
  - Resplendent desert shovel-nosed snake (Sonora annulata, syn. Chionactis annulata)
- Sonoran shovel-nosed snake (Sonora palarostris, syn. Chionactis palarostris) LC

Indigo snakes

- Eastern indigo snake (Drymarchon couperi) LC T
- Gulf coast indigo snake (Drymarchon kolpobasileus)
- Central American indigo snake (Drymarchon melanurus) LC

Speckled racers

- Speckled racer (Drymobius margaritiferus)

Mexican hognose snakes

- Tamaulipan hook-nosed snake (Ficimia streckeri) LC

Plateau hooknose snakes

- Chihuahuan hook-nosed snake (Gyalopion canum) LC
- Thornscrub hook-nosed snake (Gyalopion quadrangulare) LC

Night snakes

- Gray-banded kingsnake (Lampropeltis alterna) LC
- Species split from the yellow-bellied kingsnake (Lampropeltis calligaster) LC:
  - Prairie kingsnake (Lampropeltis calligaster)
  - South Florida mole kingsnake (Lampropeltis occipitolineata)
  - Northern mole kingsnake (Lampropeltis rhombomaculata)

Short-tailed snake

- Short-tailed kingsnake (Lampropeltis extenuata) NT

Kingsnakes

- Species split from the common kingsnake (Lampropeltis getula) LC:
  - Eastern kingsnake (Lampropeltis getula)
  - California kingsnake (Lampropeltis californiae)
  - Speckled kingsnake (Lampropeltis holbrooki)
  - Eastern black kingsnake (Lampropeltis nigra)
  - Desert kingsnake (Lampropeltis splendida)
  - Florida kingsnake (Lampropeltis floridana)
  - Apalachicola kingsnake (Lampropeltis meansi)
  - Western black kingsnake (Lampropeltis nigrita)
- Arizona mountain kingsnake (Lampropeltis pyromelana) LC and:
  - Madrean mountain kingsnake (Lampropeltis (pyromelana) knoblochi)
- Species split from the milksnake (Lampropeltis triangulum):
  - Eastern milksnake (Lampropeltis triangulum)
  - Scarlet kingsnake (Lampropeltis elapsoides)
  - Mexican milksnake (Lampropeltis (triangulum) annulata)
  - Western milksnake (Lampropeltis gentilis)
- California mountain kingsnake (Lampropeltis zonata) LC and:
  - Coast mountain kingsnake (Lampropeltis (zonata) multifasciata)

Rough green snake

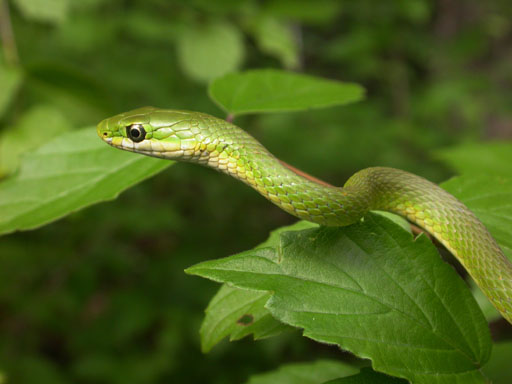
Rough greensnake (Opheodrys aestivus)

- Rough greensnake (Opheodrys aestivus) LC

Smooth green snake

- Smooth greensnake (Opheodrys vernalis) LC

Neotropical vine snakes

- Brown vinesnake (Oxybelis aeneus) and:
  - Thrornscrub vine snake (Oxybelis microphthalmus)

Leaf-nosed snakes

- Saddled leaf-nosed snake (Phyllorhynchus browni) LC
- Spotted leaf-nosed snake (Phyllorhynchus decurtatus) LC

Bull, gopher, and pine snakes

- Gopher snake (Pituophis catenifer) LC
- Pinesnake (Pituophis melanoleucus) LC
- Louisiana pine snake (Pituophis ruthveni) EN

Pine wood snake

- Pine woods littersnake (Rhadinaea flavilata) LC

Long-nosed snake

- Long-nosed snake (Rhinocheilus lecontei) LC

Patch-nosed snakes

- Eastern patch-nosed snake (Salvadora grahamiae) LC and:
  - Texas patchnose snake (Salvadora lineata)
- Western patch-nosed snake (Salvadora hexalepis) LC and:
  - Big Bend patch-nosed snake (Salvadora (hexalepis) deserticola) (split from S. hexalepis)

Mountain ratsnake

- Green ratsnake (Senticolis triaspis) LC

Black-headed, flat-headed, and crowned snakes

- Mexican black-headed snake (Tantilla atriceps) LC
- Southeastern crowned snake (Tantilla coronata) LC
- Trans-Pecos black-headed snake (Tantilla cucullata) LC (formerly in T. rubra)
- Flat-headed snake (Tantilla gracilis) LC
- Smith's black-headed snake (Tantilla hobartsmithi) LC
- Plains black-headed snake (Tantilla nigriceps) LC
- Rim rock crowned snake (Tantilla oolitica) EN
- Western black-headed snake (Tantilla planiceps) LC
- Florida crowned snake (Tantilla relicta) LC
- Chihuahuan black-headed snake (Tantilla wilcoxi) LC
- Yaqui black-headed snake (Tantilla yaquia) LC

Lyre snakes

- Sonoran lyresnake (Trimorphodon lambda)
- California lyresnake (Trimorphodon lyrophanes)
- Texas lyresnake (Trimorphodon vilkinsonii) LC (formerly in T. biscutatus)

Subfamily: Natricinae

Shovel-nosed snakes

- Kirtland's snake (Clonophis kirtlandii) NT

Water snakes

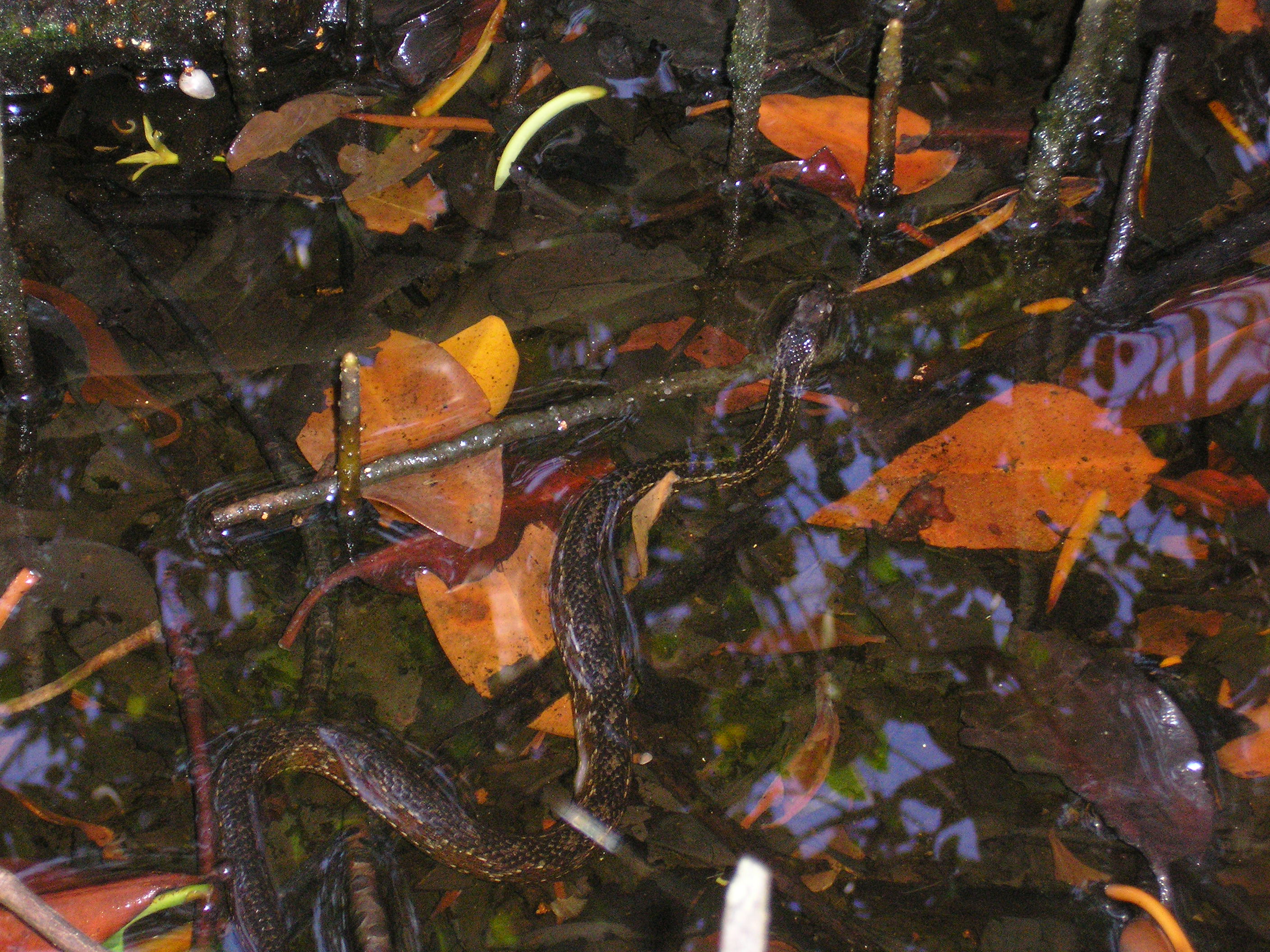
Saltmarsh watersnake (Nerodia clarkii)

- Saltmarsh snake (Nerodia clarkii) LC:
  - Gulf saltmarsh watersnake (N. c. clarkii)
  - Mangrove saltmarsh watersnake (N. c. compressicauda)
  - Atlantic saltmarsh watersnake (N. c. taeniata) T
- Mississippi green watersnake (Nerodia cyclopion) LC
- Plain-bellied watersnake (Nerodia erythrogaster) LC
  - Copper-bellied watersnake (N. e. neglecta) T)
- Southern watersnake (Nerodia fasciata) LC:
  - Broad-banded watersnake (N. f. confluens)
  - Banded watersnake (N. f. fasciata)
  - Florida watersnake (N. f. pictiventris)
- Florida green watersnake (Nerodia floridana) LC
- Brazos River watersnake (Nerodia harteri) NT
- Concho watersnake (Nerodia paucimaculata) NT
- Diamond-backed watersnake (Nerodia rhombifer) LC
- Common watersnake (Nerodia sipedon) LC
- Brown watersnake (Nerodia taxispilota) LC

Crayfish snakes

- Graham's crayfish snake (Regina grahamii) LC
- Queensnake (Regina septemvittata) LC

Swampsnakes

- Striped swampsnake (Liodytes alleni) LC
- Glossy swampsnake (Liodytes rigida) LC
- Black swampsnake (Liodytes pygaea) LC

Brown snakes

- Dekay's brown snake (Storeria dekayi) LC and:
  - Florida brown snake (Storeria victa)
- Red-bellied snake (Storeria occipitomaculata) LC

Garter snakes

- Aquatic gartersnake (Thamnophis atratus) LC
- Short-headed gartersnake (Thamnophis brachystoma) LC
- Butler's gartersnake (Thamnophis butleri) LC
- Sierra gartersnake (Thamnophis couchii) LC
- Black-necked gartersnake (Thamnophis cyrtopsis) LC
- Terrestrial gartersnake (Thamnophis elegans) LC
- Mexican gartersnake (Thamnophis eques) LC
- Giant gartersnake (Thamnophis gigas) VU T
- Two-striped gartersnake (Thamnophis hammondii) LC
- Checkered gartersnake (Thamnophis marcianus) LC
- Northwestern gartersnake (Thamnophis ordinoides) LC
- Western ribbonsnake (Thamnophis proximus) LC
- Plains gartersnake (Thamnophis radix) LC
- Narrow-headed gartersnake (Thamnophis rufipunctatus) LC
- Eastern ribbonsnake (Thamnophis saurita) LC
- Common gartersnake (Thamnophis sirtalis) LC
  - San Francisco gartersnake (T. s. tetrataenia) E)

Lined snake

- Lined snake (Tropidoclonion lineatum) LC

Earth snakes

- Rough earthsnake (Haldea striatula) LC
- Smooth earthsnake (Virginia valeriae) LC

Subfamily: Dipsadinae

Sharp-tailed snakes

- Forest sharp-tailed snake (Contia longicaudae)
- Common sharp-tailed snake (Contia tenuis) LC

Night snakes

- Species split from the night snake (Hypsiglena torquata) LC:
  - Desert nightsnake (Hypsiglena chlorophaea)
  - Chihuahuan nightsnake (Hypsiglena jani)
  - Coast nightsnake (Hypsiglena ochrorhyncha)

Cat-eyed snakes

- Northern cat-eyed snake (Leptodeira septentrionalis)

Subfamily: Xenodontinae

Worm snakes

- Common wormsnake (Carphophis amoenus) LC
- Western wormsnake (Carphophis vermis) LC

Black-striped snake

- Regal black-striped snake (Coniophanes imperialis) LC

Ringneck snake

- Ring-necked snake (Diadophis punctatus) LC

Mud snake and rainbow snake

- Red-bellied mudsnake (Farancia abacura) LC
- Rainbow snake (Farancia erytrogramma) LC

Hog-nosed snakes

- Species split from the western hog-nosed snake (Heterodon nasicus) LC:
  - Plains hog-nosed snake (Heterodon nasicus)
  - Dusty hog-nosed snake (Heterodon gloydi)
  - Mexican hog-nosed snake (Heterodon kennerlyi)
- Eastern hog-nosed snake (Heterodon platirhinos) LC
- Southern hog-nosed snake (Heterodon simus) VU

==== Family: Viperidae ====
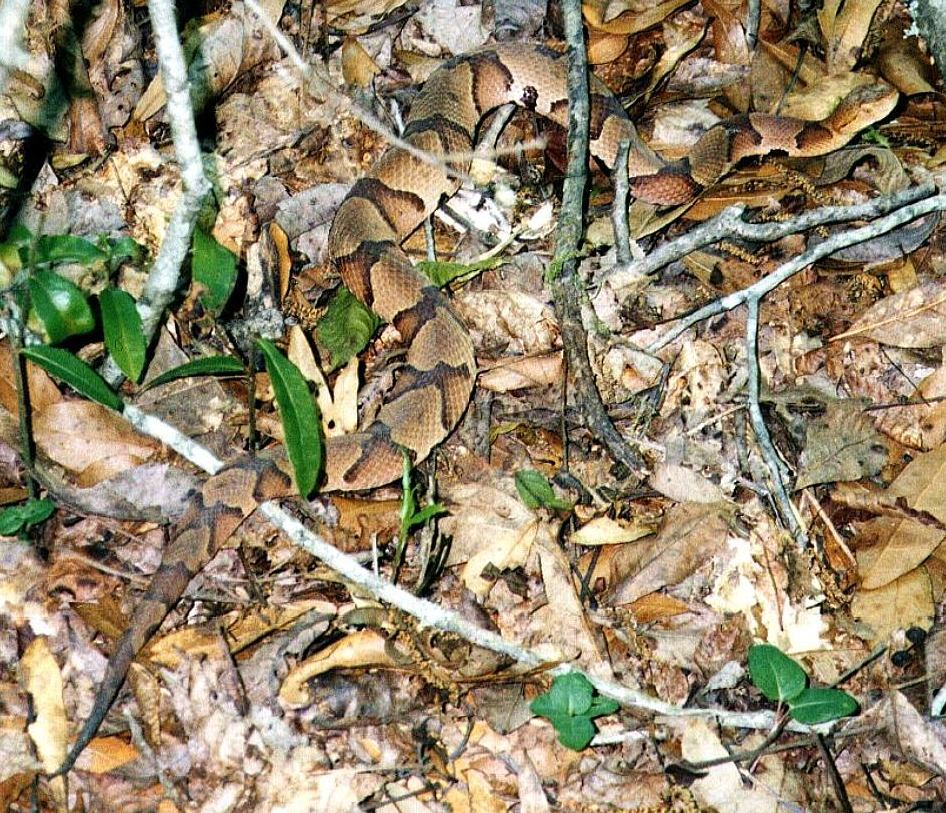
Copperhead (Agkistrodon contortrix) camouflaged in dead leaves

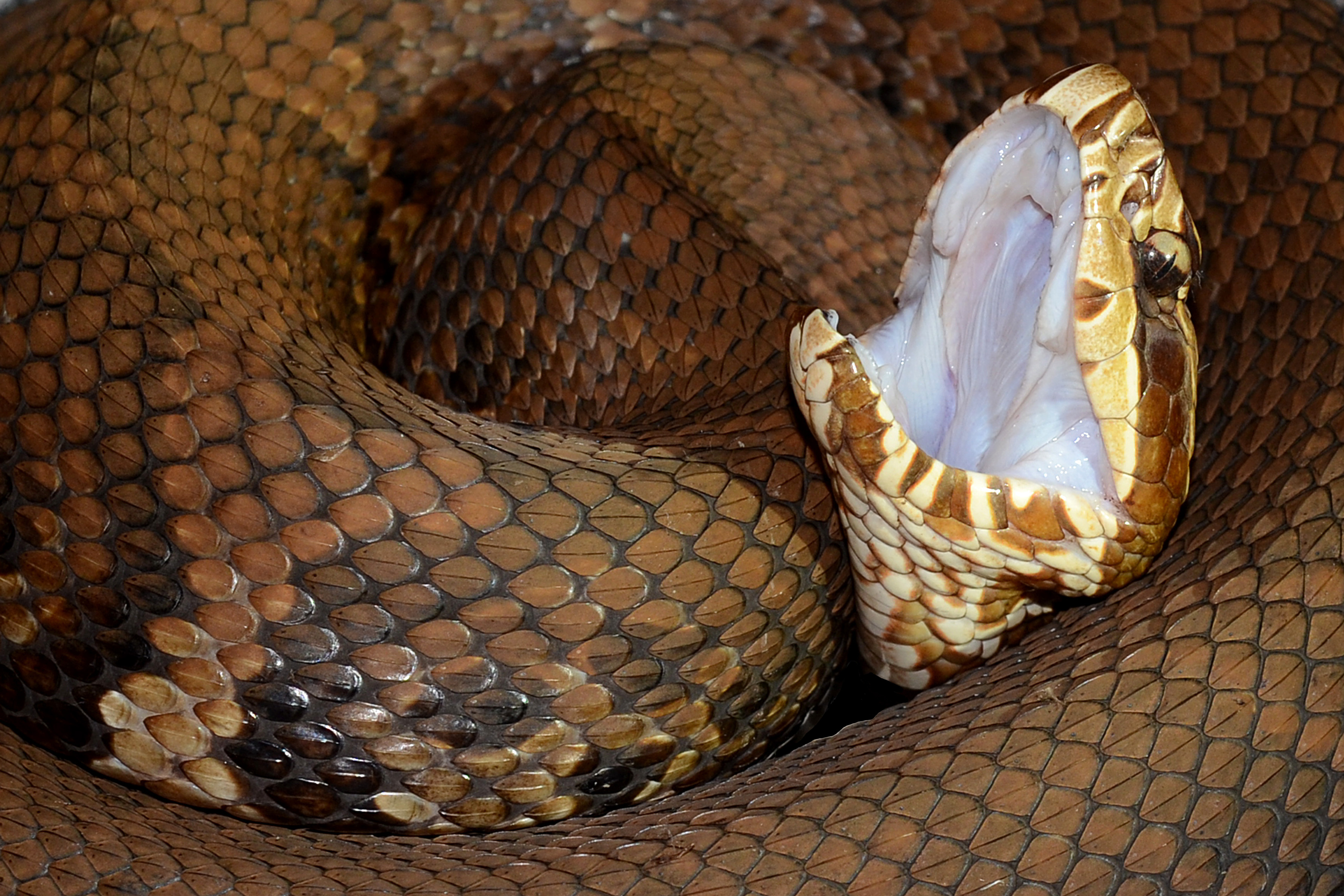
Cottonmouth (Agkistrodon piscivorus)

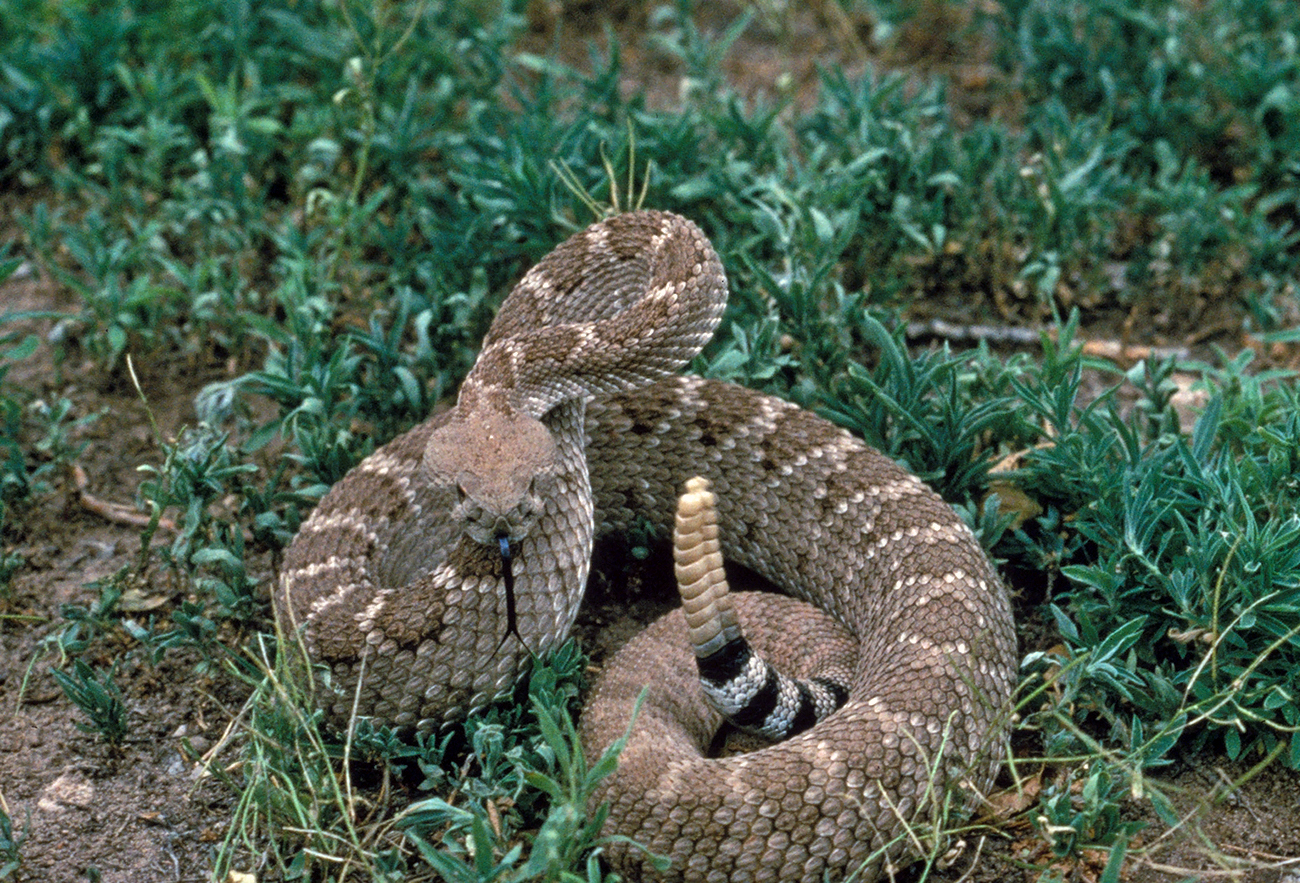
Western diamondback rattlesnake (Crotalus atrox)

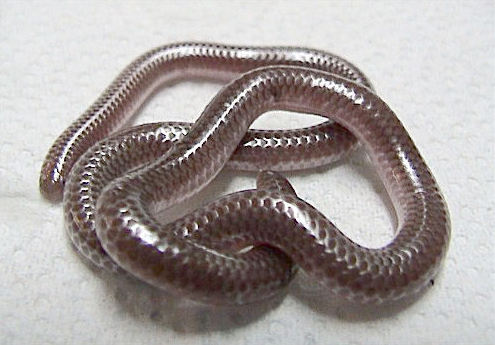
Texas threadsnake (Rena dulcis)

Subfamily: Crotalinae

Copperhead and cottonmouth

- Eastern copperhead (Agkistrodon contortrix) LC and:
  - Broad-banded copperhead (Agkistrodon laticinctus)
- Northern cottonmouth (Agkistrodon piscivorus) LC and:
  - Florida cottonmouth (Agkistrodon conanti)

Rattlesnakes

- Eastern diamondback rattlesnake (Crotalus adamanteus) LC
- Western diamondback rattlesnake (Crotalus atrox) LC
- Sidewinder (Crotalus cerastes) LC
- Timber rattlesnake (Crotalus horridus) LC
- Rock rattlesnake (Crotalus lepidus) LC
- Species split from the speckled rattlesnake (Crotalus mitchellii):
  - Panamint rattlesnake (Crotalus stephensi)
  - Southwestern speckled rattlesnake (Crotalus pyrrhus)
- Species split from the black-tailed rattlesnake (Crotalus molossus) LC:
  - Western black-tailed rattlesnake (Crotalus molossus)
  - Eastern black-tailed rattlesnake (Crotalus ornatus)
- Species split from the prairie rattlesnake (Crotalus viridis) LC:
  - Prairie rattlesnake (Crotalus viridis)
  - Arizona black rattlesnake (Crotalus cerberus)
- Species split from the western rattlesnake (Crotalus oreganus) LC:
  - Northern Pacific rattlesnake (Crotalus (oreganus) oreganus)
  - Great Basin rattlesnake (Crotalus lutosus)
  - Midget faded rattlesnake (Crotalus (oreganus) concolor)
  - Southern Pacific rattlesnake (Crotalus (oreganus) helleri)
- Twin-spotted rattlesnake (Crotalus pricei) LC
- Red diamond rattlesnake (Crotalus ruber) LC
- Mohave rattlesnake (Crotalus scutulatus) LC
- Tiger rattlesnake (Crotalus tigris) LC
- Ridge-nosed rattlesnake (Crotalus willardi) LC
  (New Mexico ridgenosed rattlesnake (C. w. obscurus): T)

Pigmy rattlesnakes

- Eastern massasauga (Sistrurus catenatus) LC and:
  - Western massasauga (Sistrurus tergeminus)
- Pygmy rattlesnake (Sistrurus miliarius) LC

==== Family: Elapidae ====
Western coral snake

- Sonoran coral snake (Micruroides euryxanthus) LC

Eastern coral snake

- Harlequin coral snake (Micrurus fulvius) LC
- Texas coral snake (Micrurus tener) LC

Subfamily: Hydrophiinae

Pelagic sea snake

- Yellow-bellied seasnake (Hydrophis platurus) LC

==== Family: Leptotyphlopidae (slender blind snakes) ====
Blind snakes

- Texas threadsnake (Rena dulcis) LC and:
  - New Mexico threadsnake (Rena dissecta) LC
- Western threadsnake (Rena humilis) LC and:
  - Trans-Pecos blind threadsnake (Rena (humilis) segrega) (split from R. humilis)

==== Family: Acrochordidae (file snakes) ====
- Javanese file snake (Acrochordus javanicus) (I) LC

==== Family: Pythonidae (pythons) ====
- Burmese python (Python bivittatus) (I) (P. (molurus) bivittatus: VU, introduced to Florida)
- Northern African rock python (Python sebae) (I)

== See also ==
- List of amphibians of North America north of Mexico
- List of U.S. state amphibians
- List of U.S. state reptiles
- List of threatened reptiles and amphibians of the United States
- List of U.S. state birds
- List of birds of North America
- List of U.S. state mammals
- List of mammals of North America
- Lists of reptiles by region
- Lists of amphibians by region
