= List of reptiles of California =

This list of reptiles of California includes the snakes, turtles and lizards found in the US state of California.

- ^{[e]} Endemic species.
- ^{[i]} Introduced species.

== Lizards ==
=== Family Anguidae ===
Species	Common name	Occurrence	Photo
Elgaria coerulia	Northern alligator lizard	North of Monterey Bay and in the Sierra Nevada	
Elgaria multicarinata	Southern alligator lizard	Throughout the state, excluding the deserts and most of the Central Valley	
Elgaria panamintina ^{[e]}	Panamint alligator lizard	Inyo and Mono Counties	

=== Family Anniellidae ===
Species	Common name	Occurrence	Photo
Anniella alexanderae ^{[e]}	Temblor legless lizard	Between California State Highway 33 and southeast base of Temblor Range, Kern County	
Anniella campi ^{[e]}	Southern Sierra legless lizard	Western Mojave Desert in Kern and Inyo Counties	
Anniella grinnelli ^{[e]}	Bakersfield legless lizard	Southern San Joaquin Valley and the east side of the Carrizo Plain	
Anniella pulchra ^{[e]}	Northern California legless lizard	Contra Costa County south to Ventura County	
Anniella stebbinsi	Southern California legless lizard	Southern California south of the Transverse Ranges into northern Baja California	

=== Family Chamaeleonidae ===
Species	Common name	Occurrence	Photo
Trioceros jacksonii ^{[i]}	Jackson's chameleon	San Luis Obispo, Los Angeles, and San Diego Counties	

=== Family Crotaphytidae ===
Species	Common name	Occurrence	Photo
Crotaphytus bicinctores	Great Basin collared lizard	East of the Sierra Nevada	
Crotaphytus vestigium	Baja California collared lizard	East of Peninsular Ranges south of Mount San Jacinto	
Gambelia copeii	Cope's leopard lizard	Barely extends into CA, around Campo, San Diego County.	
Gambelia sila ^{[e]}	Blunt-nosed leopard lizard	San Joaquin Valley	
Gambelia wislizenii	Long-nosed leopard lizard	Mojave and Sonoran Deserts	

=== Family Dactyloidae ===
Species	Common name	Occurrence	Photo
Anolis carolinensis ^{[i]}	Green anole	Coastal Southern California	
Anolis sagrei ^{[i]}	Brown anole	Small isolated populations in San Diego County	

=== Family Eublepharidae ===
Species	Common name	Occurrence	Photo
Coleonyx switaki	Switak's banded gecko	Borrego Springs south to Baja California	
Coleonyx variegatus	Western banded gecko	Most of inland Southern California	

=== Family Gekkonidae ===
Species	Common name	Occurrence	Photo
Cyrtopodion scabrum ^{[i]}	Rough-tailed gecko	Inyo County near Death Valley	
Hemidactylus garnotii ^{[i]}	Indo-Pacific gecko	Los Angeles, Orange, and San Diego Counties	
Hemidactylus mabouia ^{[i]}	Tropical house gecko	Orange and San Diego Counties	
Hemidactylus turcicus ^{[i]}	Mediterranean house gecko	Southern California and San Joaquin Valley, scattered throughout the rest of the state	
Tarentola annularis ^{[i]}	Ringed wall gecko	Redlands, San Bernardino County	
Tarentola mauritanica ^{[i]}	Moorish gecko	San Diego County	

=== Family Helodermatidae ===
Species	Common name	Occurrence	Photo
Heloderma suspectum	Gila monster	Scattered populations in Inyo, San Bernardino, Riverside, and Imperial Counties	

=== Family Iguanidae ===
Species	Common name	Occurrence	Photo
Dipsosaurus dorsalis	Desert iguana	Mojave and Sonoran Deserts	
Sauromalus ater	Common chuckwalla	Mojave and Sonoran Deserts excluding Algodones Dunes	

=== Family Lacertidae ===
Species	Common name	Occurrence	Photo
Acanthodactylus boskianus ^{[i]}	Bosc's fringe-toed lizard	Coastal Ventura County	
Podarcis siculus ^{[i]}	Italian wall lizard	San Pedro, Los Angeles County	

=== Family Phrynosomatidae ===
Species	Common name	Occurrence	Photo
Callisaurus draconoides	Zebra-tailed lizard	Mojave and Sonoran Deserts	
Petrosaurus mearnsi	Banded rock lizard	East of Peninsular Ranges south of San Gorgonio Pass	
Phrynosoma blainvilli	Coast horned lizard	West of Sierra Nevada and deserts, north to the Bay Area, and inland as far north as Shasta Reservoir	
Phrynosoma douglasii	Pygmy short-horned lizard	Far northeast near Oregon	
Phrynosoma mcallii	Flat-tail horned lizard	Most of Colorado Desert, excluding Algodones Dunes	
Phrynosoma platyrhinos	Desert horned lizard	Sonoran and Mojave Deserts and far northeast in Great Basin Desert	
Sceloporus becki ^{[e]}	Island fence lizard	Channel Islands	
Sceloporus graciosus	Common sagebrush lizard	Mountains surrounding Central Valley north to Oregon and east to Nevada	
Sceloporus magister	Desert spiny lizard	Sonoran Desert	
Sceloporus occidentalis	Western fence lizard	Throughout California excluding most of Sonoran and Mojave Deserts	
Sceloporus orcutti	Granite spiny lizard	Lower slopes of Peninsular Ranges south of San Gorgonio Pass	
Sceloporus uniformis	Yellow-backed spiny lizard	Mojave Desert with scattered populations in Coast Ranges.	
Sceloporus vandenburgianus	Southern sagebrush lizard	Transverse and Peninsular Ranges	
Uma inornata ^{[e]}	Coachella Valley fringe-toed lizard	Coachella Valley	
Uma notata	Colorado Desert fringe-toed lizard	Colorado Desert	
Uma scoparia	Mojave fringe-toed lizard	Mojave Desert between Death Valley and Colorado River	
Urosaurus graciosus	Long-tailed brush lizard	Sonoran and Mojave Deserts	
Urosaurus microscutatus	Small-scaled lizard	East side of Peninsular Ranges south of Borrego Palm Canyon, Marron Valley, Cottonwood, and Deerhorn Flat areas on the west side.	
Urosaurus ornatus	Ornate tree lizard	Native along Colorado River, introduced in San Bernardino County and El Centro	
Uta stansburiana	Common side-blotched lizard	Southern California north to Bay Area, excluding the Central Valley and including Great Basin Desert near Nevada	

=== Family Phyllodactylidae ===
Species	Common name	Occurrences	Photo
Phyllodactylus nocticolus	Peninsular leaf-toed gecko	East of Peninsular Ranges, south of Palm Springs	

=== Family Scincidae ===
Species	Common name	Occurrences	Photo
Chalcides ocellatus ^{[i]}	Ocelated skink	Small populations in San Bernardino and San Diego Counties	
Plestiodon gilberti	Gilbert's skink	Sierra Nevada, Coast, Transverse, and Peninsular Ranges, with populations in Mojave Desert	
Plestiodon skiltonianus	Western skink	Coastal and Northern California, with populations in Sierra Nevada and Great Basin Desert	
Trachylepis Quinquetaeniata ^{[i]}	African five-lined skink	Glendora, Los Angeles County	

=== Family Teiidae ===
Species	Common name	Occurrences	Photo
Aspidoscelis hyperythrus	Orange-throated whiptail	Coastal Southern California west of Peninsular Ranges	
Aspidoscelis tigris	Tiger whiptail	Desert regions, Central Valley, Coast, Transverse, and Peninsular Ranges	
Aspidoscelis sonorae ^{[i]}	Sonoran spotted whiptail	Orange and northern San Diego Counties	

=== Family Xantusiidae ===
Species	Common name	Occurrence	Photo
Xantusia gracilis ^{[e]}	Sandstone night lizard	Anza-Borrego State Park	
Xantusia henshawi	Granite night lizard	Peninsular Ranges south of San Gorgonio Pass	
Xantusia riversiana ^{[e]}	Island night lizard	Santa Barbara Island, Sutil Islet, San Clemente Island, and San Nicolas Island	
Xantusia sierrae ^{[e]}	Sierra night lizard	Southwestern foothills of the Sierra Nevada Mountains along the western edge of the Greenhorn mountains in Kern County	
Xantusia vigilis	Desert night lizard	Throughout the Mojave Desert, Transverse and Coast Ranges, and southern Sierra Nevada, Santa Catalina Island population may be introduced	
Xantusia wigginsi	Baja California night lizard	Scissor's Crossing, San Diego County and east of Jacumba	

== Snakes ==
=== Family Boidae ===
Species	Common name	Occurrence	Photos
Charina bottae	Northern rubber boa	Sierra Nevada and Coast Ranges north of Monterey County, north of Central Valley	
Charina umbratica ^{[e]}	Southern rubber boa	Disjunct areas in the San Bernardino and San Jacinto Mountains	
Lichanura orcutti	Coastal rosy boa	San Diego County north and east into Mojave and Sonoran Deserts, excluding Imperial Valley	

=== Family Colubridae ===
Species	Common name	Occurrence	Photo
Arizona elegans	Glossy snake	Southern California, north up the Coast Ranges to Bay Area.	
Bogertophis rosaliae	Baja California rat snake	May exist near Mexico border in Imperial County	
Chionactis occipitalis	Western shovelnose snake	Mojave Desert	
Coluber constrictor	North American Racer	Throughout California excluding San Joaquin Valley and desert regions	
Contia longicaudae	Forest sharp-tailed snake	Del Norte, Humboldt, Mendocino, San Mateo, Santa Clara, Santa Cruz, Sonoma, and Trinity Counties, hugging the coast.	
Contia tenuis	Sharp-tailed snake	Sierra Nevada and Coast Ranges north of Tulare County	
Diadophis punctatus	Ringneck snake	Mountainous regions and near Nevada	
Hypsiglena chlorophaea	Desert nightsnake	Mojave, Sonoran, and Great Basin Deserts	
Hypsiglena ochrorhynchus	Coast night snake	Sierra Nevada and Coast Ranges, coastal Southern California	
Lampropeltis californiae	California kingsnake	Entire state excluding extreme NW coast, NE Great Basin Desert, and high elevations	
Lampropeltis multifasciata	Coast mountain kingsnake	Coast, Transverse, and Peninsular Ranges from Monterey County south	
Lampropeltis zonata	California mountain kingsnake	Coast Ranges north of Monterey County, and Sierra Nevada	
Masticophis flagellum	Coachwhip	Southern California, San Joaquin Valley, inner Coast Ranges north to Bay Area	
Masticophis fuliginosus	Baja California coachwhip	San Diego County near Mexico	
Masticophis lateralis	California striped whipsnake	Mountainous regions in ring around Central Valley south to Mexico	
Masticophis taeniatus	Striped whipsnake	Great Basin Desert	
Nerodia fasciata ^{[i]}	Banded water snake	Colorado River, Lake Natoma, and Lake Machado	
Neroida sipedon ^{[i]}	Common water snake	Roseville, Placer County	
Phyllorhynchus decurtatus	Western leaf-nosed snake	Sonoran and Mojave Deserts	
Pituophis catenifer	Gopher snake	All of California excluding high Sierras	
Rhinocheilus lecontei	Long-nosed snake	Inner Coast Ranges, Mojave, Sonoran and Great Basin Deserts, and the Sierra Nevada foothills	
Salvadora hexalepis	Western patch-nosed snake	Southern California and Great Basin Desert	
Sonora annulata	Colorado Desert shovelnose snake	Sonoran (Colorado) Desert	
Sonora semiannulata	Western ground snake	Eastern Mojave, Sonoran, and Great Basin Deserts	
Tantilla hobartsmithi	Southwestern blackhead snake	Southern Sierra foothills and Mojave Desert	
Tantilla planiceps	Western black-headed snake	Inner Coast Ranges south from Bay Area, Transverse and Peninsular Ranges	
Thamnophis atratus	Aquatic garter snake	Coast Ranges north from Santa Barbara County to Oregon	
Thamnophis couchii	Sierra garter snake	Sierra Nevada	
Thamnophis elegans	Terrestrial garter snake	Northern California, Sierra Nevada, and Coast Ranges south to Santa Barbara County. Isolated population in San Bernardino Mountains	
Thamnophis gigas	Giant garter snake	Central Valley	
Thamnophis hammondii	Two-striped garter snake	Coastal California south of Monterey Bay	
Thamnophis marcianus	Checkered garter snake	Colorado River and Imperial Valley as north as Mecca	
Thamnophis ordinoides	Northwestern garter snake	Extreme northwest corner of state	
Thamnophis sirtalis	Common garter snake	Most of state excluding desert regions, San Joaquin Valley and high Sierras	
Trimorphodon lambda	Sonoran lyre snake	Near Colorado River	
Trimorphodon lyrophanes	California lyresnake	Southern California, southeast of a line between Inyo and Santa Barbara Counties, but absent from large parts of the Mojave and Colorado Deserts.	

=== Family Hydrophiinae ===
Species	Common name	Occurrences	Photo
Hydrophis platurus	Yellow-bellied sea snake	Occasionally beaches in Southern California	

=== Family Leptotyphlopidae ===
Species	Common name	Occurrences	Photo
Rena humilis	Western threadsnake	Southern California north to southern Great Basin Desert	

=== Family Typhlopidae ===
Species	Common name	Occurrence	Photo
Indotyphlops braminus ^{[i]}	Brahminy blind snake	Southern California	

=== Family Viperidae ===
Species	Common name	Occurrences	Photo
Crotalus atrox	Western diamondback rattlesnake	Sonoran Desert	
Crotalus cerastes	Sidewinder	Mojave and Sonoran Deserts	
Crotalus helleri	Southern Pacific rattlesnake	Transverse and Peninsular Ranges north to Santa Barbara County	
Crotalus lutosus	Great Basin rattlesnake	Great Basin Desert	
Crotalus oreganus	Northern Pacific rattlesnake	North of Santa Barbara County, excluding deserts	
Crotalus ruber	Red diamond rattlesnake	South of San Bernardino County, west of desert region.	
Crotalus pyrrhus	Southwestern speckled rattlesnake	Peninsular Ranges, Sonoran and southern Mojave Deserts, excluding Imperial Valley	
Crotalus scutulatus	Mojave rattlesnake	Mojave Desert	
Crotalus stephensi	Panamint rattlesnake	Northern Mojave Desert	

== Turtles ==
=== Family Cheloniidae ===
Species	Common name	Occurrences	Photo
Caretta caretta	Loggerhead sea turtle	Southern California waters, does not nest	
Chelonia mydas	Green sea turtle	California waters, does not nest	
Eretmochelys imbricata	Hawksbill sea turtle	Southern California waters, does not nest	
Lepidochelys olivacea	Olive ridley sea turtle	Southern California waters, does not nest	

=== Family Chelydridae ===
Species	Common name	Occurrences	Photo
Chelydra serpentina ^{[i]}	Common snapping turtle	Populations scattered throughout the state	

=== Family Dermochelyidae ===
Species	Common name	Occurrences	Photo
Dermochelys coriacea	Leatherback sea turtle	California waters, does not nest	

=== Family Emydidae ===
Species	Common name	Occurrences	Photo
Chrysemys picta ^{[i]}	Western painted turtle	Mostly Bay Area and coastal Southern California	
Actinemys marmorata	Northwestern pond turtle	Central Valley north to Oregon	
Actinemys pallida	Southwestern pond turtle	Peninsular, Transverse, and Coast Ranges north to Bay Area	
Trachemys scripta ^{[i]}	Red-eared slider	Populations scattered throughout the state	

=== Family Kinosternidae ===
Species	Common name	Occurrences	Photo
Kinosternon sonoriense	Sonoran mud turtle	Along Colorado River, probably extirpated	

=== Family Testudinidae ===
Species	Common name	Occurrences	Photo
Gopherus agassizii	Mojave desert tortoise	Mojave and eastern Sonoran Desert	

=== Family Trionychidae ===
Species	Common name	Occurrences	Photo
Apalone ferox ^{[i]}	Florida softshell	Bay Area and Los Angeles Basin	
Apalone spinifera ^{[i]}	Spiny softshell	Colorado River and in scattered populations across the state	
