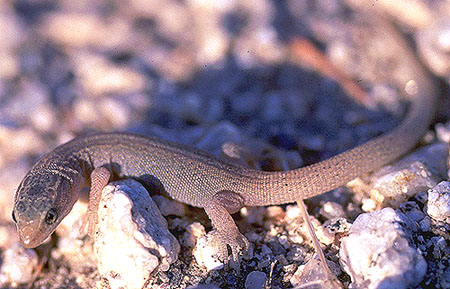
- Xantusia vigilis

Scientific classification
- Kingdom: Animalia
- Phylum: Chordata
- Class: Reptilia
- Order: Squamata
- Family: Xantusiidae
- Subfamily: Xantusiinae
- Genus: Xantusia; Baird, 1859

= Xantusia =

Genus of lizards

Xantusia (/zænˈtuːziə/) is one of three genera of night lizards (family Xantusiidae). Species of Xantusia are small to medium-sized, viviparous (live-bearing) lizards found in the U.S. Southwest and in northern Mexico. These lizards display morphological adaptations to specific microhabitats. They occupy rock crevices and decaying plants. Rock dwellers generally have brighter coloration, longer limbs and digits, and larger size than plant dwellers, which are generally duller, smaller, and have shorter limbs.
Species of the genus Xantusia are remarkably disjunct, with populations scattered throughout the deserts and mountains of the far western borderlands with only a handful of recorded cases of interspecific allopatry. The genus contains at least seven distinct cases of morphological convergence to the rock dwelling ecomorph in Arizona, California, Baja California, and Central Mexico.

== Taxonomy and etymology ==
The names and descriptions of the genus Xantusia and the type species X. vigilis were published in 1859 by Spencer Fullerton Baird, the generic name commemorating the naturalist John Xantus.
Based on the most current phylogenetic analyses of Xantusiid lizards, The earliest-diverging species of the genus is Xantusia riversiana. Sister to this species are two clades: the X. vigilis species complex, and the southern Xantusia. The X. vigilis species complex is made up of X. vigilis, X. arizonae, X. sierrae, X. bezyi, X. wigginsi, and its most recent addition X. jaycolei. The Southern Xantusia contains X. gilberti, X. sherbrookii, X. gracilis, X. henshawi, X. bolsonae, X. extorris, and X. sanchezi.

== Species ==
The following is a list of species in the genus.

- Xantusia arizonae Klauber, 1931 – Arizona night lizard
- Xantusia bezyi Papenfuss, Macey & J.A. Schulte, 2001 – Bezy's night lizard
- Xantusia bolsonae Webb, 1970 – bolsón night lizard
- Xantusia extorris Webb, 1965 – Durango night lizard
- Xantusia gilberti Van Denburgh, 1895 – Gilbert's night lizard
- Xantusia gracilis Grismer & Galvan, 1986 – sandstone night lizard
- Xantusia henshawi Stejneger, 1893 – granite night lizard
- Xantusia jaycolei R. Bezy, K. Bezy & Bolles, 2008
- Xantusia riversiana Cope, 1883 – island night lizard
- Xantusia sanchezi R. Bezy & Flores-Villela, 1999 – Sanchez's night lizard
- Xantusia sherbrookei R. Bezy, K. Bezy & Bolles, 2008
- Xantusia sierrae R. Bezy, 1967 – sierra night lizard
- Xantusia vigilis Baird, 1859 – desert night lizard
- Xantusia wigginsi Savage, 1952 – Wiggins's desert night lizard
