= Xantusia gilberti =

Scientific classification
- Kingdom: Animalia
- Phylum: Chordata
- Class: Reptilia
- Order: Squamata
- Family: Xantusiidae
- Genus: Xantusia
- Species: X. gilberti

Binomial name
- Xantusia gilberti Van Denburgh, 1895

Synonyms
- Xantusia gilberti Van Denburgh, 1895; Amoebopsis gilberti — Cope, 1895; Xantusia vigilis gilberti — Savage, 1952; Xantusia gilberti — Sinclair et al., 2004

Species of lizard

Xantusia gilberti, also known commonly as the Baja California night lizard and la nocturna de Baja California in Mexican Spanish, is a species of small lizard in the family Xantusiidae. The species is native to the southern Baja California Peninsula of Mexico.

== Etymology ==
The specific name, gilberti, is in honor of American ichthyologist Charles Henry Gilbert.

== Description ==
The holotype of X. gilberti has a snout-to-vent length (SVL) of about 4 cm (1.6 in), and a tail length about equal to SVL. The eye is very small, with a vertical pupil. There are nine femoral pores on one leg and eight on the other.

== Reproduction ==
X. gilberti is viviparous.
