= Xantusia sanchezi =

Conservation status
- Least Concern (IUCN 3.1)

Scientific classification
- Kingdom: Animalia
- Phylum: Chordata
- Class: Reptilia
- Order: Squamata
- Suborder: Scinciformata
- Infraorder: Scincomorpha
- Family: Xantusiidae
- Genus: Xantusia
- Species: X. sanchezi

Binomial name
- Xantusia sanchezi Bezy & Flores Villela, 1999

Species of lizard

Xantusia sanchezi, Sanchez's night lizard, is a species of lizard in the family Xantusiidae. It is a small lizard found in Mexico.
