= Durango night lizard =

Conservation status
- Least Concern (IUCN 3.1)

Scientific classification
- Domain: Eukaryota
- Kingdom: Animalia
- Phylum: Chordata
- Class: Reptilia
- Order: Squamata
- Family: Xantusiidae
- Genus: Xantusia
- Species: X. extorris

Binomial name
- Xantusia extorris Webb, 1965

Species of lizard

The Durango night lizard (Xantusia extorris) is a diminutive lizard found in the Mexican state of Durango. It is usually found in niches of agave and yucca plants.
