= Xantusia sherbrookei =

Scientific classification
- Domain: Eukaryota
- Kingdom: Animalia
- Phylum: Chordata
- Class: Reptilia
- Order: Squamata
- Family: Xantusiidae
- Genus: Xantusia
- Species: X. sherbrookei

Binomial name
- Xantusia sherbrookei Bezy, Bezy, & Bolles, 2008

Species of lizard

Xantusia sherbrookei is a species of lizard in the family Xantusiidae. It is a small lizard found in the Baja California Peninsula of Mexico.
