= Xantusia jaycolei =

Scientific classification
- Kingdom: Animalia
- Phylum: Chordata
- Class: Reptilia
- Order: Squamata
- Family: Xantusiidae
- Genus: Xantusia
- Species: X. jaycolei

Binomial name
- Xantusia jaycolei Bezy, Bezy & Bolles, 2008

Species of lizard

Xantusia jaycolei is a species of lizard in the family Xantusiidae. The species is native to Mexico specifically inhabiting the rugged and biodiverse regions of the country.

== Etymology ==
The specific name, jaycolei, is in honor of American herpetologist Charles J. "Jay" Cole.

== Geographic range ==
X. jaycolei is endemic to the Mexican state of Sonora.

== Reproduction ==
X. jaycolei is viviparous.
