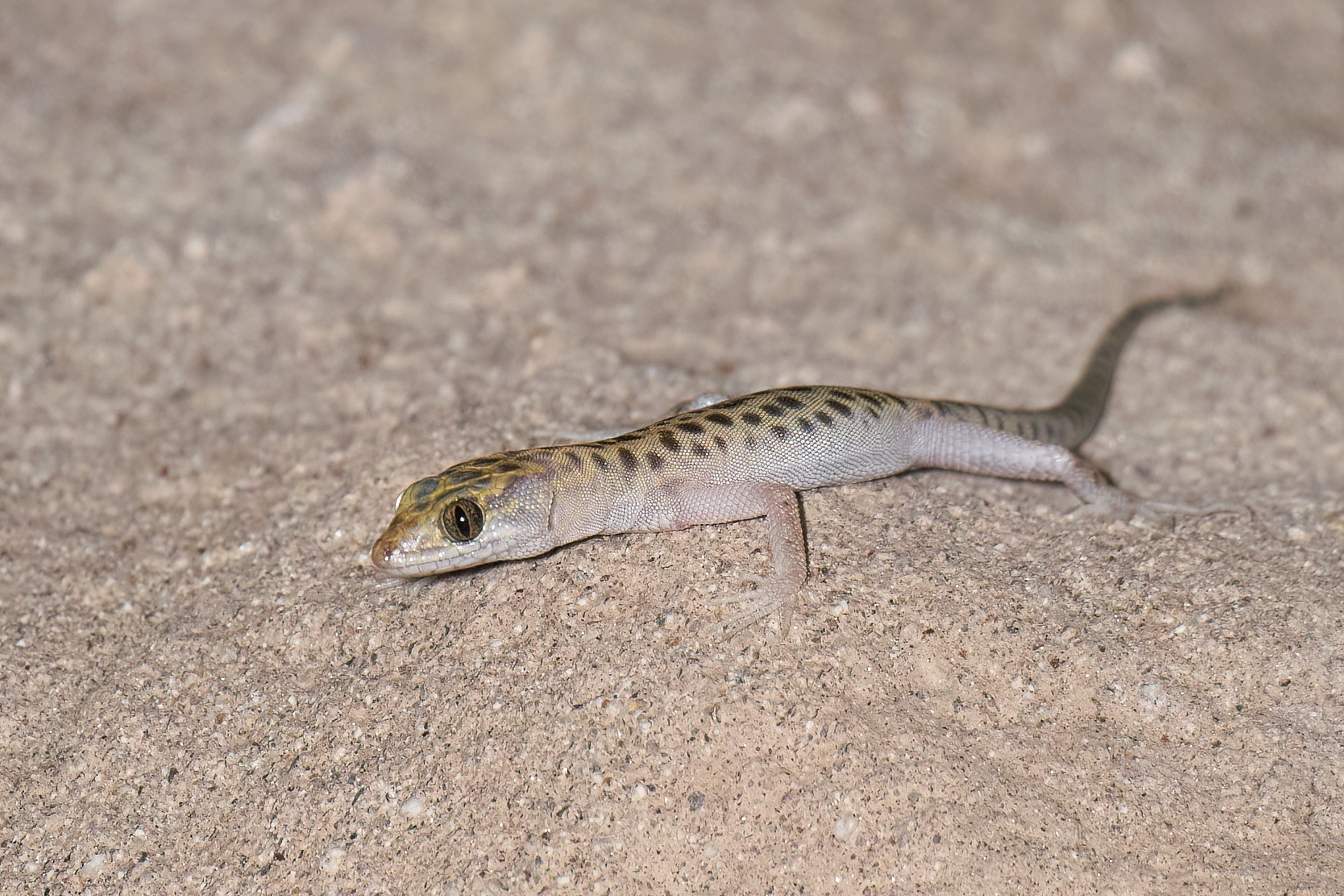

Conservation status
- Vulnerable (IUCN 3.1)

Scientific classification
- Kingdom: Animalia
- Phylum: Chordata
- Class: Reptilia
- Order: Squamata
- Family: Xantusiidae
- Genus: Xantusia
- Species: X. gracilis

Binomial name
- Xantusia gracilis Grismer & Galvan, 1986

Synonyms
- Xantusia henshawi gracilis Grismer & Galvan, 1986

= Sandstone night lizard =

Species of lizard

The sandstone night lizard (Xantusia gracilis) is a species of lizard in the family Xantusiidae. It is endemic to Truckhaven Rocks, a 3 km^{2} (1.2 sq mi) area in the southeastern part of the Santa Rosa Mountains of California, United States.

== Taxonomy ==
The first description of Xantusia gracilis was published by Lee Grismer and Mark Galvan in 1986, who used the name Xantusia henshawi gracilis. The name gracilis is taken from the Latin for 'slender', chosen in reference to the lizard's form. The holotype, a male, was collected by Grismer and Galvan in February 1985, with the type locality being Truckhaven Rocks, Anza-Borrego Desert State Park, California. Robert Lovich was first to recognized gracilis as being a separate species from Xantusia henshawi, doing so in 2001 after conducting a molecular study.

== Description ==
The sandstone night lizard usually has a snout–vent length of 60–71 mm (2.4–2.8 in) in adulthood. Its back is white to yellow with small, uniform black dots, and its underside is white with minor black dotting in some areas. The colouration is in contrast to its relatives Xantusia henshawi and Xantusia bolsonae, who have much more extensive markings on their backs and significant black dotting on their undersides. Other morphological differences to its relatives include a greatly enlarged temporal scale and a narrower head. It also spends more time on the ground instead of climbing than its relatives do.

== Distribution and habitat ==
The sandstone night lizard is only known to inhabit a region in the southeastern part of the Santa Rosa Mountains known as Truckhaven Rocks, located 24.5 km (15.2 mi) to the east and 6.3 km (3.9 mi) to the north of Borrego Springs, San Diego County.

The region consists mainly of sandstone and siltstone, sits at an elevation of about 240–305 m (787–1,001 ft), and is roughly 3 km (1.9 mi) long east to west and 1.3 km (0.81 mi) long north to south, covering an area of about 3 km^{2} (1.2 sq mi). Sandstone crevices and burrows make up the sandstone night lizard's habitat, with most of these being found in and along the many canyons of Truckhaven Rocks, most of which are 30–60 m (98–197 ft) deep.

The species was listed as vulnerable on the IUCN Red List after a 2007 assessment due to the very limited extent of its habitat.
