= Bolsón night lizard =

Conservation status
- Data Deficient (IUCN 3.1)

Scientific classification
- Kingdom: Animalia
- Phylum: Chordata
- Class: Reptilia
- Order: Squamata
- Family: Xantusiidae
- Genus: Xantusia
- Species: X. bolsonae

Binomial name
- Xantusia bolsonae Webb, 1970

Synonyms
- Xantusia henshawi bolsonae Webb, 1970; Xantusia bolsonae — Liner, 1994

Species of lizard

The bolsón night lizard (Xantusia bolsonae) is a species of night lizard in the family Xantusiidae. The species, which was originally described by Robert G. Webb in 1970, is endemic to the state of Durango in Mexico. Not much is known about the lizard at present, as it appears to be simultaneously rare and rather secretive in nature.

== Description ==
The bolsón night lizard is predictably small, due to its behavior and habitat. It tends to be around 6 centimeters (2.4 inches) in snout-to-vent length (SVL) length, with a similar tail length proportionate to body size. The body is covered by scales, totaling 50 in the dorsal region, featuring leopard print markings of a dark brown pigment across the back. The species can be distinguished from close relatives through fewer rows of dorsal scales, a decreased number of upper labials, a lack of dark peppering on the stomach, fewer femoral pores, a narrower head to body ratio, and an attainment of reduced eventual size at the end of maturation.

== Distribution and habitat ==
The species is prevalent in the state of Durango, in particular the area around the township of Pedriceña. It has also been reported in the nearby Cañon San Fernandes protected reserve, and has been observed crossing State Highway 40. The lizard inhabits fissures in andesitic rock outcrops, predominantly within areas dominated by yucca vegetation. Physiographically, the area falls within the boundaries of the Bolsón de Mapimí and the Chihuahuan Desert.

== Reproduction ==
X. bolsonae is viviparous.

== Population ==
The population size of the species X. bolsonae is currently unknown, but the lizard seems to be quite rare. The lack of accurate population data can generally be attributed to the secretive nature of the species, creating issues in regards to collecting and examining specimens. During the initial survey of 1969, researchers located ten male and female individuals including the holotype, and recent colored photographic evidence from 2007 proves that the species is still extant in the original location of surveyal.

== Threats ==
The only apparent threat to the X. bolsonae is the disturbance of the habitat in which it resides. The habitat is not particularly wide-ranging in size, and is concentrated to only a fairly localised area. However, due to a lack of knowledge regarding the species, it is impossible to determine the impacts of habitat encroachment until a later interval.
