= Copper-tailed skink =

There are two species of skink named copper-tailed skink:

- Ctenotus taeniolatus, found in Australia
- Emoia cyanura, found in Borneo and South Pacific islands
