= Bezy's night lizard =

Conservation status
- Least Concern (IUCN 3.1)

Scientific classification
- Kingdom: Animalia
- Phylum: Chordata
- Class: Reptilia
- Order: Squamata
- Family: Xantusiidae
- Genus: Xantusia
- Species: X. bezyi

Binomial name
- Xantusia bezyi Papenfuss, Macey & Schulte, 2001
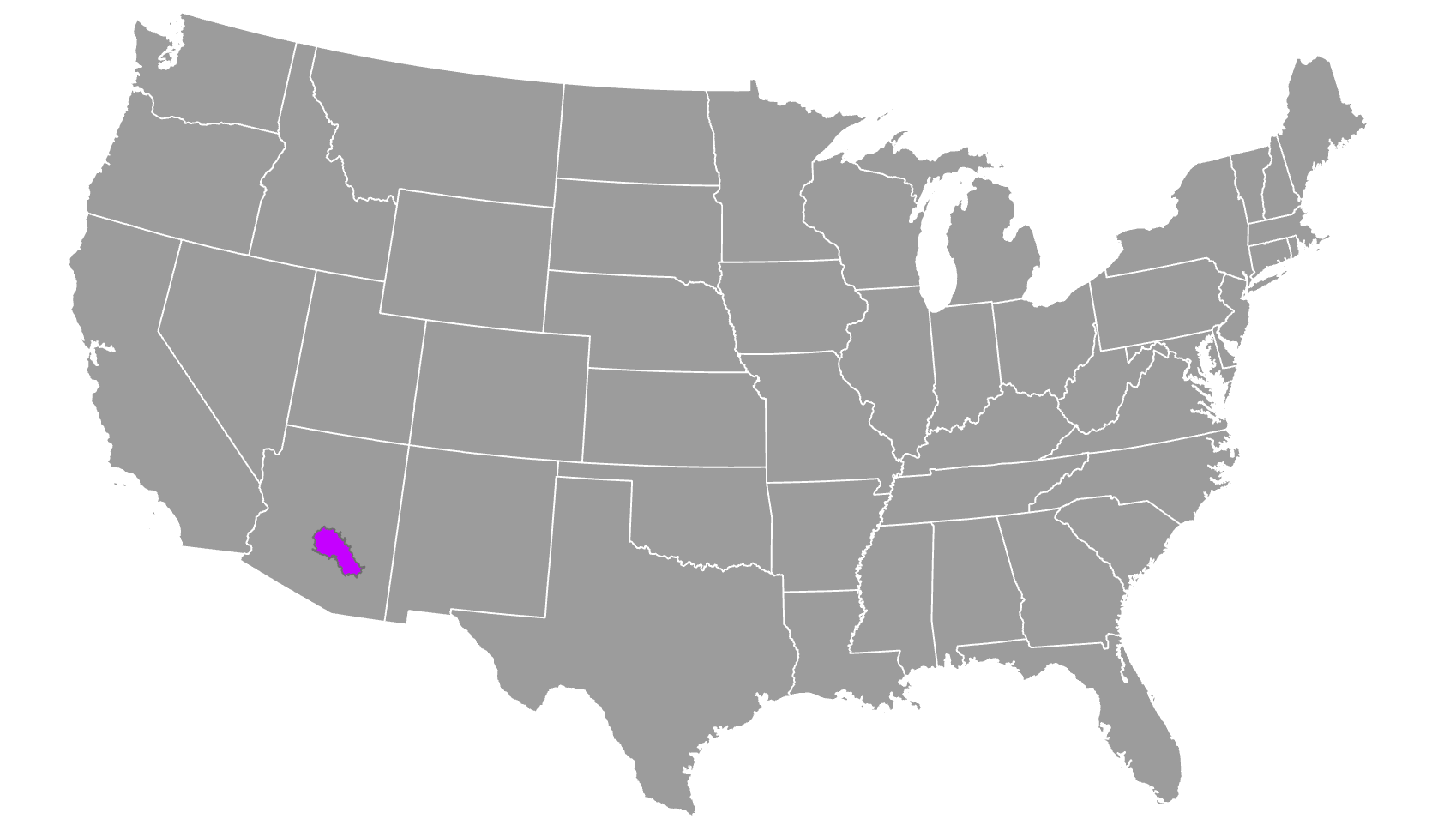
- Bezy's night lizard range

Species of lizard

Bezy's night lizard (Xantusia bezyi) is a species of lizard in the family Xantusiidae. The species is endemic to Arizona.

== Etymology ==
Bezy's night lizard is named after noted American herpetologist Robert Lee Bezy (born 1941).

== Geographic range ==
X. bezyi is found in central Arizona.

== Description ==
Small, smooth-skinned, and gray-brown to yellow-brown, X. bezyi measures 1.5 to 2.75 inches (38 to 70 mm) from its nose to its vent. It has a flattened head, and dark splotches on its back. The eyes lack eyelids and have vertical, linear pupils.

== Habitat ==
Desert highlands and pine woodlands are the preferred habitats of X. bezyi, where it is found under exfoliating rock in granite outcrops.

== Diet ==
The diet of X. bezyi consists of spiders and insects.

== Behavior ==
During daylight hours X. bezyi shelters in rock crevices.

== Reproduction ==
X. bezyi is viviparous.
