= Arizona night lizard =

Conservation status
- Least Concern (IUCN 3.1)

Scientific classification
- Kingdom: Animalia
- Phylum: Chordata
- Class: Reptilia
- Order: Squamata
- Suborder: Scinciformata
- Infraorder: Scincomorpha
- Family: Xantusiidae
- Genus: Xantusia
- Species: X. arizonae

Binomial name
- Xantusia arizonae Klauber, 1931

Synonyms
- Xantusia vigilis subsp. arizonae Klauber, 1931

Species of lizard

The Arizona night lizard (Xantusia arizonae) is a species of small smooth-skinned gray-brown lizards with dark spots that sometimes form partial lines down the back. The lizard has a slightly flattened head. The scales of the underside and tail are larger than those of the upper side. The lizard grows to a length of 6 to 10 cm (2.4 to 3.9 in).

Despite its name, the Arizona night lizard is primarily active during the day. The lizard's range extends across west-central Arizona. It is usually found in rock crevices or under plant debris. Its diet consists of insects and spiders. The young of the lizard are born live, usually one or two around August or September. As the lizard tends not to move about and generally avoids humans, not much is known about it.

== Description ==
The species grows to maximum size of about 10 cm (3.9 in). The head is covered with large, smooth plates. Body scales are small, while belly scales are rectangular. The dorsal side is covered with many small dark spots tending to form rows. The eyes are large and round with a vertical pupil (similar to a snake's eye).

The species is a secretive lizard. It feeds, reproduces, and lives most of its life in seclusion. Populations of night lizards at low elevations become active in the spring and through the summer, while higher elevation populations may not become active until late spring. Daily activity patterns are difficult to determine due to their secretive behavior. Some of the night lizard's predators include larger lizards, many snakes, and birds.

== Ecology ==
The Arizona night lizard is found under exfoliating rock in granite outcrops. The night lizard species occurs primarily in rock-crevice habitat, but also has been found in Neotoma nests and in decaying Yucca baccata. The habitat extends from the Arizona Upland Sonoran Desert scrub to the Interior Chaparral.

The diet consists primarily of ants, termites, flies, beetles, spiders, among other insects. Its predators include larger lizards, birds, and snakes.

== Conservation ==
In January 2014, the Center for Biological Diversity, an environmental group, petitioned the United States Fish and Wildlife Service to add seven species of reptiles and amphibians, including the Arizona night lizard, to the endangered species list. The petition was denied in March 2016.
