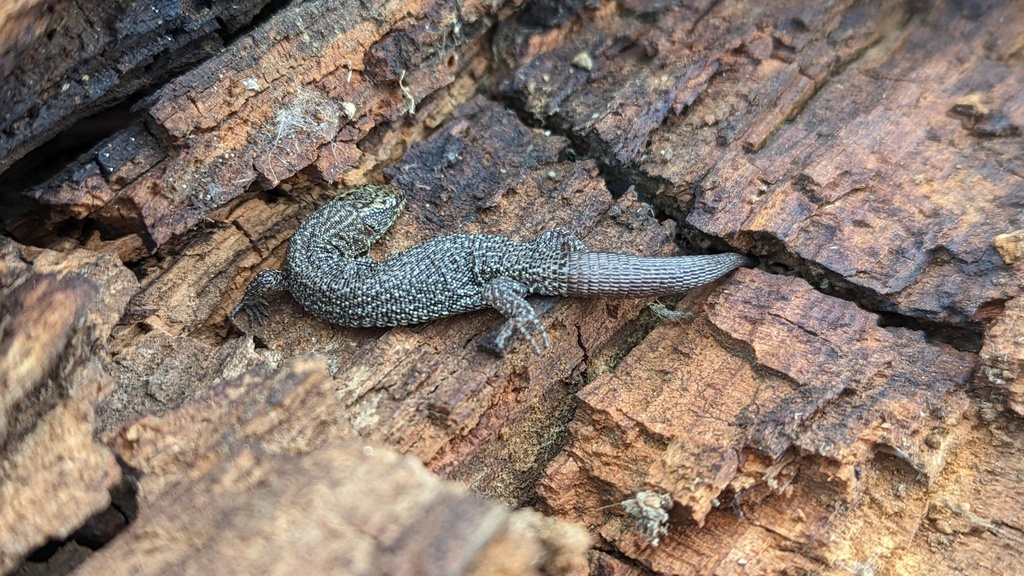

Conservation status
- Critically Imperiled (NatureServe)

Scientific classification
- Kingdom: Animalia
- Phylum: Chordata
- Class: Reptilia
- Order: Squamata
- Suborder: Scinciformata
- Infraorder: Scincomorpha
- Family: Xantusiidae
- Genus: Xantusia
- Species: X. sierrae

Binomial name
- Xantusia sierrae Bezy, 1967
- Xantusia sierrae range map (2021), from the California Department of Fish and Wildlife

Synonyms
- Xantusia vigilis subsp. sierrae Bezy, 1967

= Xantusia sierrae =

Species of lizard

Xantusia sierrae, the Sierra night lizard, is a species of lizard in the family Xantusiidae. It is a small lizard found in California.
