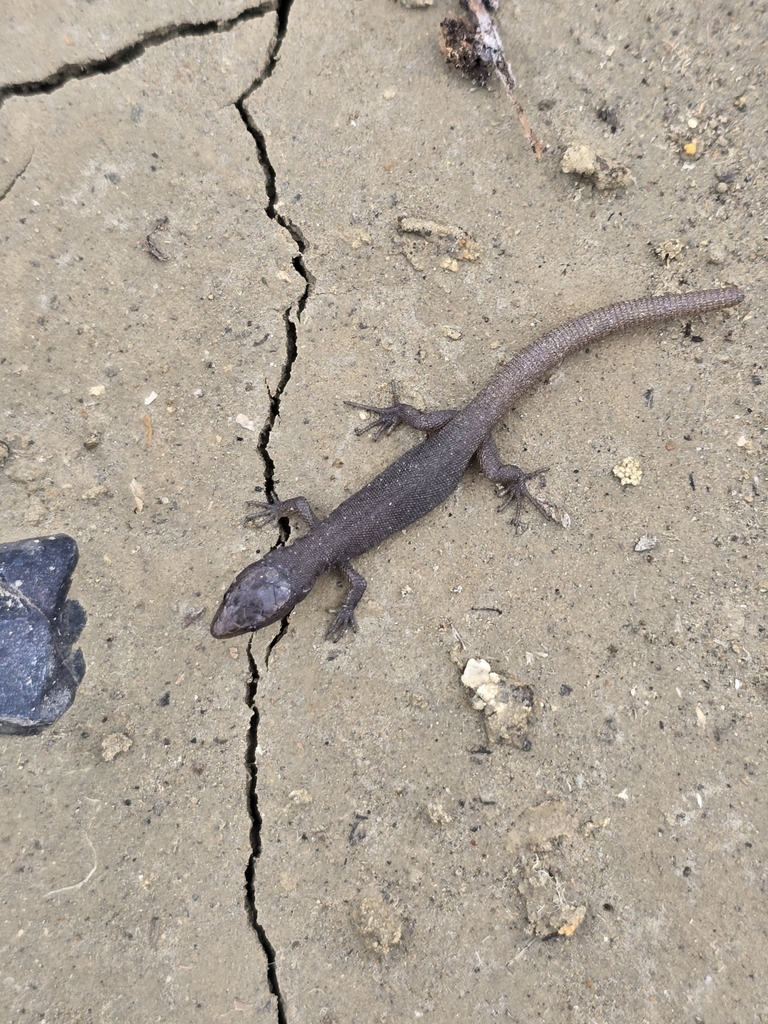

Scientific classification
- Kingdom: Animalia
- Phylum: Chordata
- Class: Reptilia
- Order: Squamata
- Family: Xantusiidae
- Genus: Xantusia
- Species: X. wigginsi

Binomial name
- Xantusia wigginsi Savage, 1952

= Xantusia wigginsi =

Species of lizard

Xantusia wigginsi, Wiggins' desert night lizard, is a species of lizard in the family Xantusiidae. It is a small lizard found in California and Mexico.

== Taxonomy ==
The Wiggins’ desert night lizard was initially described in 1952 by Jay M. Savage in his journal article "Studies on the Lizard Family Xantusiidae I." which was published in The American Midland Naturalist. Xantusia wigginsi is a subspecies of the Xantusia vigilis, the desert night lizard. Savage named Xantusia wigginsi after Ira Wiggins, a botanist at Stanford University who collected its type specimen.

== Description ==
The Wiggins’ desert night lizard is small, with a snout-vent length of around 22.0-44.0 mm, with the tail slightly longer than the body. What distinguishes Xantusia wigginsi from its subspecies are its dorsal pattern of distinct rather than fused spots, ventral size, and presence of tail dark spots only on the scale-tips.

Like other subspecies of Xantusia vigilis, the Wiggins’ desert night lizard is characterized by features including a wedge-shaped head and rounded snout, a flat and tapered tail, and an elongate body with peritoneum black coloring. Specimens have been observed with a grayish-brown base coloring with stripes near the eyes and a light ventrum. Dark brown spots cover the dorsal region and limbs, as well as the sides of the body; the tail tends to be lighter in coloration and display spots at the scale-tips.

== Distribution and habitat ==
The Wiggins’ desert night lizard is endemic to the Americas. In particular, Xantusia wigginsi has been found in Southern California, including the Sonoran Desert and Baja California. It has not been observed in neither the Vizcaino Peninsula nor the Colorado Desert strip, but otherwise has a rather continuous range along the peninsula. It’s often associated with microhabitats of yuccas and agaves, but has also been found near sotol and pine logs.

== Behavior ==
The Wiggins’ desert night lizard tends to give birth in the late summer.

A case of mouth-gaping behavior in Xantusia wigginsi upon being held by hand had been observed prior by Shedd (2010), suspected to be a threat display rather than a reaction to heat.

== Phylogeny ==
Research by Noonan et al. support the current idea that Xantusia is monophyletic, reflecting research by Sinclair et al. In particular, there is a monophyly between the northern clade that Xantusia wigginsi is part of, a southern clade, and Xantusia riversania.
