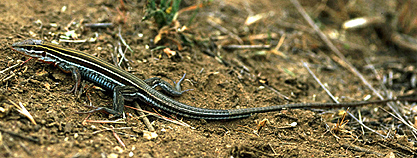

Conservation status
- Least Concern (IUCN 3.1)

Scientific classification
- Kingdom: Animalia
- Phylum: Chordata
- Class: Reptilia
- Order: Squamata
- Family: Teiidae
- Genus: Aspidoscelis
- Species: A. hyperythrus

Binomial name
- Aspidoscelis hyperythrus (Cope, 1863)

Subspecies
- A. h. beldingi (Stejneger, 1894); A. h. hyperythrus (Cope, 1863); A. h. schmidti (Van Denburgh & Slevin, 1921)

= Orange-throated whiptail =

Species of lizard

The orange-throated whiptail (Aspidoscelis hyperythrus) is a species of lizard in the family Teiidae. The species was previously placed in the genus Cnemidophorus. Three subspecies are recognized as being valid, including the nominotypical subspecies.

== Geographic range ==
A. hyperythrus is native to southern California in the United States, and to the states of Baja California and Baja California Sur in Mexico.

== Description ==
A. hyperythrus has five or six light-colored stripes down a black, brown, or grey dorsal side. The middle stripe may be forked at both ends. The species is whitish-yellow or cream on the venter, and has an orange throat (females and juveniles may lack this character). Its head is yellow-brown to olive-colored, and its tongue is forked and flicked continually. It has a snout-to-vent length of 5–7.2 centimetres (2.0–2.8 in).

Juveniles of this species have cobalt blue legs and tails. The entire ventral surface of males, including the tail, may be orange, although gravid females may also have some orange especially lining the lower jaw. The colors are most distinct in the breeding season. Males have larger femoral pores than females.

== Behavior ==
The orange-throated whiptail has a distinctive, jerking gait.

== Etymology ==
The subspecific names, beldingi and schmidti, are in honor of American ornithologist Lyman Belding and American herpetologist Karl Patterson Schmidt, respectively.
