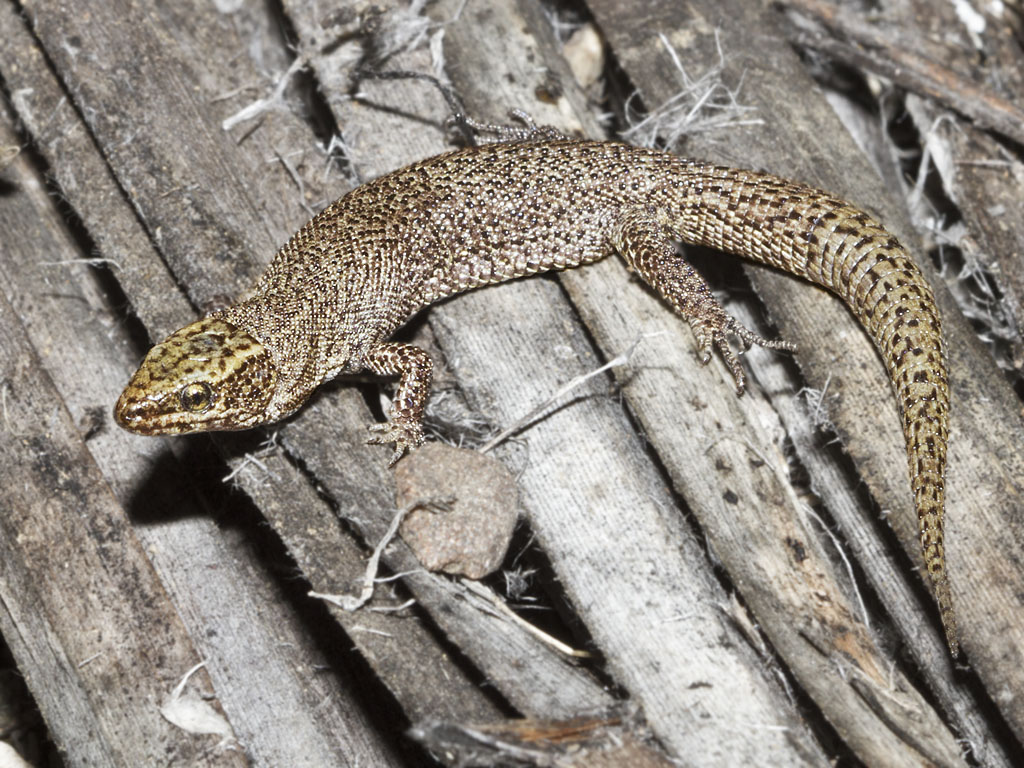

Conservation status
- Least Concern (IUCN 3.1)

Scientific classification
- Kingdom: Animalia
- Phylum: Chordata
- Class: Reptilia
- Order: Squamata
- Family: Xantusiidae
- Genus: Xantusia
- Species: X. vigilis

Binomial name
- Xantusia vigilis Baird, 1859

= Desert night lizard =

Species of lizard

The desert night lizard (Xantusia vigilis) is a night lizard native to the Southern California Eastern Sierra and the San Gabriel Mountains into Baja California, southern Nevada, southwestern Utah and extreme western areas of Arizona.

== Description ==
The desert night lizard attains a snout-to-vent length (SVL) of 1.5 to 2.75 in (3.8 to 7.0 cm) with a tail roughly the same length. The lizard's coloring is usually grey, yellow-brownish, or olive. Despite their name, night lizards are active during the day. They are known to easily change their color, from light olive (usually during the evening) to dark brown during the day. It is a good climber and usually eats termites, small insects, spiders and other arthropods.

The desert night lizard is small for a reptile, with the average adult female at 80 mm in total length and 1.3 g in weight. Adult males are slightly smaller at 65 mm in total length and 1.1 g in weight. Male desert night lizards are distinguishable from females as they are lighter and shorter in length. They also have a stouter and wider tail, as well as enlarged femoral pores. Most desert night lizards have 12 longitudinal rows of rectangular ventral scales with 30-50 granular dorsal scales around their mid-region. Above each eye, they have supraorbital scales (one around the nasal bone, two frontal ones, and two parietal scales). Typically, the color along their body ranges from light gray to brown. They can often be a single, uniform color, but some species have been found to have dark spots.

== Habitat and distribution ==
X. vigilis can be found along the Southwestern coast of the United States and northern regions of Mexico. There is great prevalence of X. vigilis in the Mohave and Sonoran Deserts, throughout southern California and Baja California. Smaller populations of X. vigilis have been found in western Arizona, central California coastal ranges, Colorado, the Sierra Nevada, and Utah.

Like most members of genus Xantusia, "X. vigilis" lives in arid and semi-arid habitats. During the day, it can be found in rock crevices or under fallen plant debris. It is usually associated with Yucca species, including Yucca brevifolia (joshua tree) and Yucca gloriosa. For this reason, "X. vigilis" may locally be referred to as the "Yucca Night Lizard". It occurs in habitats where "Yucca" is absent, but higher population density is usually associated with the presence of yucca plants. Like other night lizards, "X. vigilis" is secretive, rarely leaving cover during the day and being more active at night.

== Social behavior ==
Like all night lizards, the desert night lizard is viviparous, giving birth to live young and producing 1 to 3 young from August to December. Unusually for a lizard, it forms family social groups with a father-mother pair and offspring, which may delay dispersing for years. The young are capable of feeding themselves but will huddle together with their relatives. They do not receive direct care from their parents and older siblings, and it is not yet known what the advantages of staying with their family members are. The baby lizards are well-camouflaged and are not much bigger than a toothpick.

Groups of Xantusia vigilis with higher levels of kin relatedness proved to be more stable than congregates of X. vigilis that lacked close genetic relationships. It is believed that kin presence for these lizard encourages philopatry (or the tendency for an animal to remain in the region of their birth as it proves advantageous to remain in a group) and winter aggregation. Reproductive success was heightened for female X. vigilis when kin presence and kin relatedness within a living group was observed.

Winter groups (aggregates formed to survive through the cold winter) proved advantageous, allowing for greater internal heat retention for individual lizards and for the collective group as a whole. Most winter groups are as large as 20 lizards. However, winter groups do not last past the winter months, typically dissolving by the time copulation occurs in June. Socially, X. vigilis is a largely sedentary species of lizard that remains obscure and hidden from plain sight. X. vigilis follow the group stability hypothesis and are more stable within their families.

== Reproduction and life cycle ==
Xantusia vigilis typically give birth to no more than two offspring per birth. There is a laterality preference based on the specific oviduct and ovary used for ovulation; when only a single ovum is ovulated there is a pressure for the right ovary to overproduce a larger number of mature ova.

Reproduction within X. vigilis is dependent on a few factors, largely centering around climate variations, diet, and nutrition.

Climatic changes heavily dictate the proceedings of gestation within X. vigilis. In damp climates this species of lizard will either prepone or postpone ovulation for drier conditions. For example, in a particularly damp spring, ovulation is typically postponed to occur in the middle of the following summer. Regardless of climate, breeding typically occurs during the spring and winter.

Diet carries a similar importance on determining the reproductive success of a given breeding season. Improper diet and malnutrition often leads to underdeveloped ova and lacking yolk deposition within female desert night lizards. Overly dry climates are heavily associated with underdevelopment in reproductive organs and reduced reproductive processes. One notable exception is that males experiencing drier climates and low resource settings have been shown to reach a greater level of testicular maturation.

The ovulation period for X. vigilis lasts approximately 2 weeks at an optimal temperature range of 75–90 °F (24–32 °C). Gestation typically lasts 90 days. No day versus night preference exists for birth itself, where the event of delivery lasts about 10 minutes. Desert night lizards may live for 8–10 years.

Among night lizards, only a certain percentage of adult females will reproduce in a given year.

The X. vigilis placenta is well developed to allow for exchange of amino acids between mother and fetus. Half of the embryo's weight gain is suspected to happen during the brief egg gestation period, from the oviduct wall to the placenta. At birth, neonates average 22–23 mm in length (SVL) and weigh approximately 0.23 g. X. vigilis mothers are reported to eat their fetal membranes.
