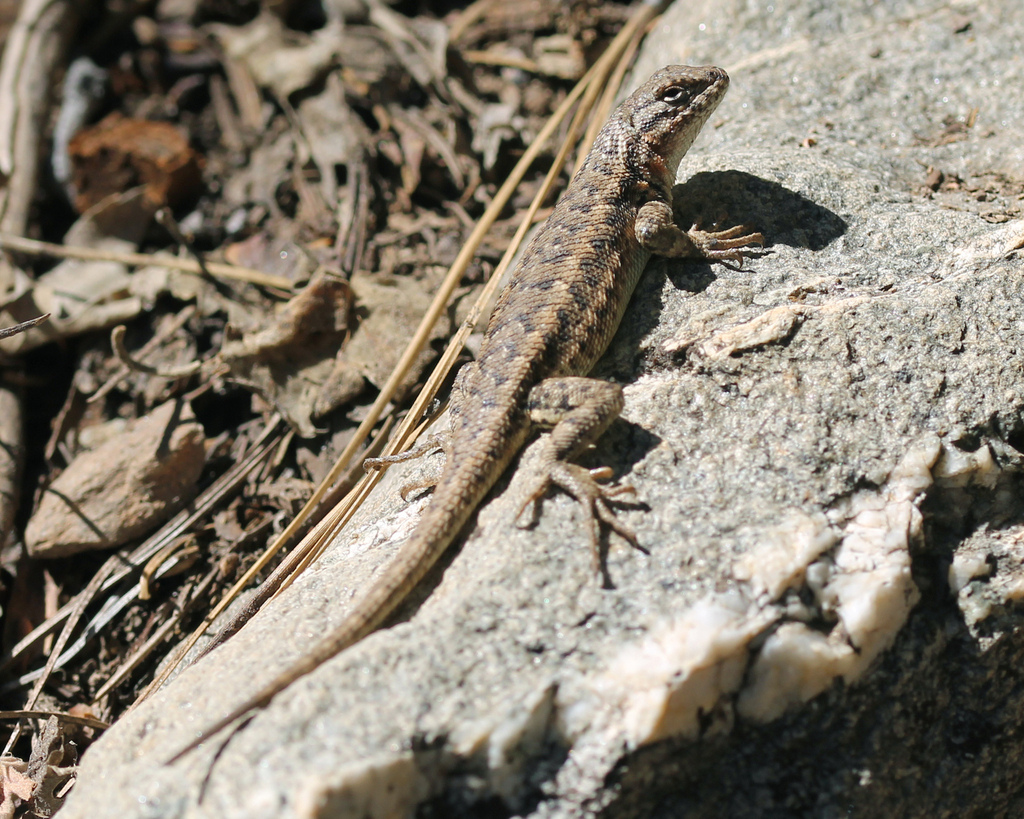
- Sceloporus vandenburgianus in Wrightwood, CA

Conservation status
- Least Concern (IUCN 3.1)

Scientific classification
- Kingdom: Animalia
- Phylum: Chordata
- Class: Reptilia
- Order: Squamata
- Suborder: Iguania
- Family: Phrynosomatidae
- Genus: Sceloporus
- Species: S. vandenburgianus

Binomial name
- Sceloporus vandenburgianus Cope, 1896

= Sceloporus vandenburgianus =

Species of lizard

Sceloporus vandenburgianus, the southern sagebrush lizard, is a species of lizard in the family Phrynosomatidae. It is found in the United States and Mexico.

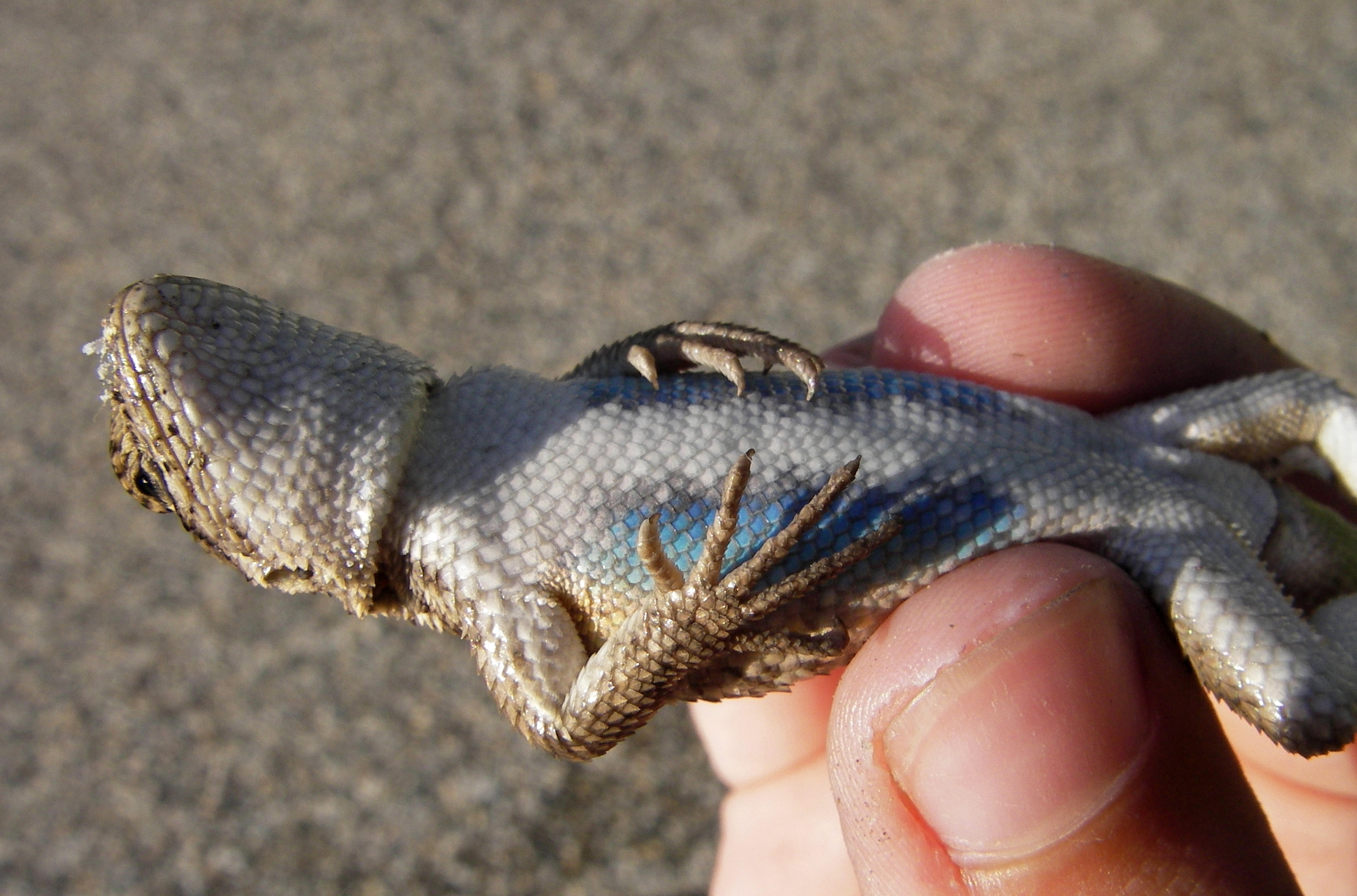
Blue patches on belly distinguish southern sagebrush lizards from related species, but are only found in males.

== Distribution ==
This species of Lizard is commonly found in Ventura County, San Bernardino County, and San Diego County.
