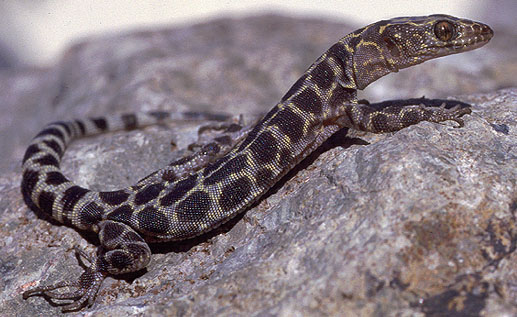

Conservation status
- Least Concern (IUCN 3.1)

Scientific classification
- Kingdom: Animalia
- Phylum: Chordata
- Class: Reptilia
- Order: Squamata
- Family: Xantusiidae
- Genus: Xantusia
- Species: X. henshawi

Binomial name
- Xantusia henshawi Stejneger, 1893

Synonyms
- Xantusia picta Cope, 1895

= Granite night lizard =

Species of lizard

The granite night lizard (Xantusia henshawi), also known commonly as Henshaw's night lizard, is a species of lizard in the family Xantusiidae. The species is endemic to North America.

== Etymology ==
The specific name, henshawi, is in honor of American naturalist Henry Wetherbee Henshaw.

== Geographic range ==
X. henshawi is found in Mexico in the Mexican state of Baja California, and also in the United States in adjacent southern California.

== Description ==
X. henshawi is flat-bodied with a broad, flat head and a soft skin. It has rounded, dark dorsal spots on a pale yellow or cream background. Its scales are granular on its dorsum, but large and squarish on the ventral surface. This lizard has large eyes with vertical pupils, and it lacks eyelids.

== Habitat and behavior ==
The granite night lizard is often found on rocky slopes with large exfoliating boulders and abundant crevices, but is occasionally found in coastal sage scrub and chaparral without boulders. It is active in crevices during the day, but moves on the surface at night.

== Reproduction ==
X. henshawi is oviparous.

== See also ==
- California coastal sage and chaparral ecoregion
