= Baur's short-horned lizard =

Scientific classification
- Kingdom: Animalia
- Phylum: Chordata
- Class: Reptilia
- Order: Squamata
- Suborder: Iguania
- Family: Phrynosomatidae
- Genus: Phrynosoma
- Species: P. bauri

Binomial name
- Phrynosoma bauri Montanucci, 2015

Species of small horned lizard

Baur's short-horned lizard (Phrynosoma bauri) is a species of small horned lizard that is endemic to the United States.

== Taxonomy ==
Populations assigned to this species were long classified in the pygmy short-horned lizard (P. douglasii) and greater short-horned lizard (P. hernandesi), within several different subspecies formerly assigned to P. douglasii. However, it was described as a distinct species, Phrynosoma bauri, by Richard R. Montanucci in 2015 based on morphological evidence. It may be a hybrid species arising from ancient hybridization between the Great Plains short-horned lizard (P. brevirostris) and desert short-horned lizard (P. ornatissimum). It is named after Bertrand E. Baur, a longtime friend of the author and studier of Phrynosoma who died from injuries sustained in a car accident in 2013.

The distinctiveness of P. bauri is still highly contested as it clashes with genetic evidence finding it to fall within P. hernandesi, and thus the American Society of Ichthyologists and Herpetologists classified it as a subspecies of P. hernandesi in 2017, and Gunther Köhler synonymized it with P. hernandesi in 2021; however, the Reptile Database still recognizes it as a distinct species.

== Distribution and habitat ==
It ranges from southern Wyoming and Nebraska south through eastern Colorado to northern New Mexico. It inhabits shortgrass prairie, pinyon–juniper woodland, and pine-douglas fir forest.

== Description ==
It can be distinguished from other members of the P. douglasii complex by its short snout and several other features of the skull, moderately short, upward-pointed cephalic horns, and the coloration of its spots.
