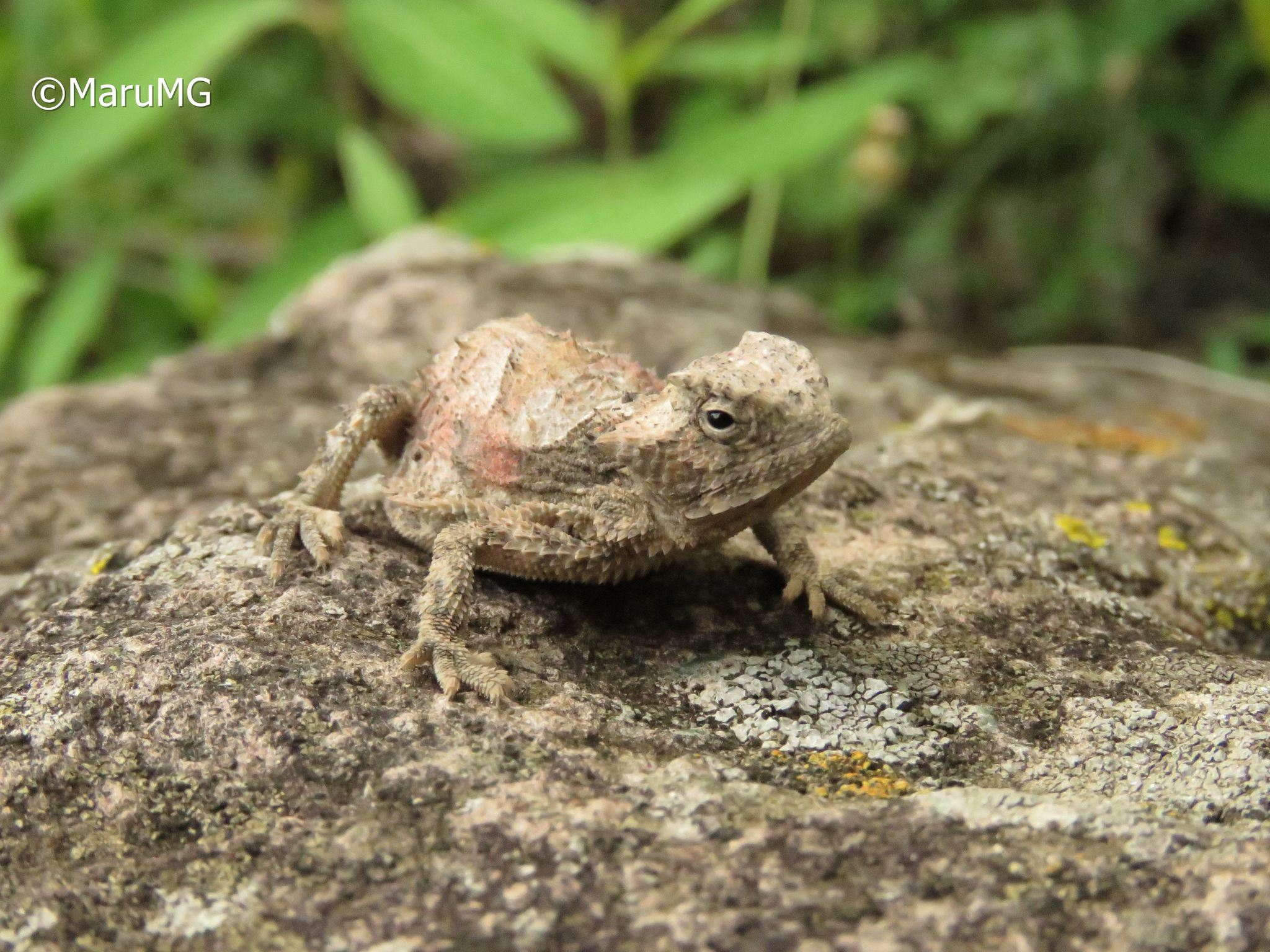

Conservation status
- Least Concern (IUCN 3.1)

Scientific classification
- Domain: Eukaryota
- Kingdom: Animalia
- Phylum: Chordata
- Class: Reptilia
- Order: Squamata
- Suborder: Iguania
- Family: Phrynosomatidae
- Genus: Phrynosoma
- Species: P. taurus

Binomial name
- Phrynosoma taurus Dugès, 1873

= Mexican horned lizard =

Species of lizard

The Mexican horned lizard (Phrynosoma taurus) is a horned lizard species native to Mexico. Horned lizards are sometimes referred to as "horned toads" or "horny toads", although they are not toads. Compared to other members of the horned lizards (genus Phrynosoma), little is known about this species.

== Geographic range ==
It is known to live in the Sierra Madre del Sur mountains, south and southeast of Mexico City, in the states of Guerrero and Puebla, Mexico. Its range partially overlaps with that of Phrynosoma braconnieri.

== Habitat ==
The Mexican horned lizard is a terrestrial species found in arid scrub, high desert, and even tropical dry forest. Phrynosoma taurus can also persist in traditional pastures.

== Reproduction ==
Phrynosoma taurus is viviparous like some horned lizards (Phrynosoma hernandezi, Phrynosoma orbiculare and others).
