= Sonoran horned lizard =

Conservation status
- Least Concern (IUCN 3.1)

Scientific classification
- Kingdom: Animalia
- Phylum: Chordata
- Class: Reptilia
- Order: Squamata
- Suborder: Iguania
- Family: Phrynosomatidae
- Genus: Phrynosoma
- Species: P. goodei

Binomial name
- Phrynosoma goodei Stejneger, 1893

Synonyms
- Phrynosoma goodei Stejneger, 1893; Anota goodei — Cope, 1896; Phrynosoma platyrhinos goodei — Pianka, 1991; Phrynosoma goodei — Mulcahy et al., 2006; Phrynosoma (Doliosaurus) goodei — Crother, 2012

Species of lizard

The Sonoran horned lizard (Phrynosoma goodei), also known commonly as Goode's desert horned lizard and el camaleón de Sonora in Mexican Spanish, is a species of horned lizard in the family Phrynosomatidae. The species is native to Arizona in the United States and to Sonora in Mexico.

== Etymology ==
The specific name, goodei, is in honor of American ichthyologist George Brown Goode.

== Habitat ==
The preferred natural habitat of P. goodei is shrubland.

== Reproduction ==
P. goodei is oviparous. The eggs are buried in the ground.
