= San Luis Valley short-horned lizard =

Scientific classification
- Domain: Eukaryota
- Kingdom: Animalia
- Phylum: Chordata
- Class: Reptilia
- Order: Squamata
- Suborder: Iguania
- Family: Phrynosomatidae
- Genus: Phrynosoma
- Species: P. diminutum

Binomial name
- Phrynosoma diminutum Montanucci, 2015

Species of lizard

The San Luis Valley short-horned lizard (Phrynosoma diminutum) is a horned lizard species native to Colorado in the United States.
