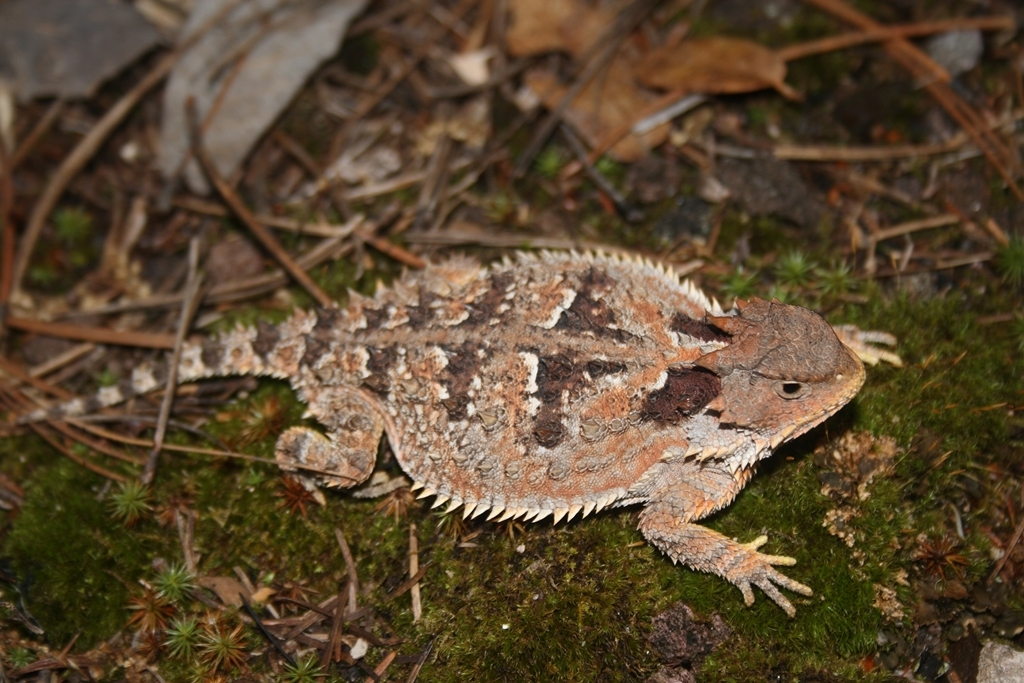
- Mexican plateau horned lizard (P. orbiculare)

Scientific classification
- Kingdom: Animalia
- Phylum: Chordata
- Class: Reptilia
- Order: Squamata
- Suborder: Iguania
- Family: Phrynosomatidae
- Genus: Phrynosoma; Wiegmann, 1828

Type species
- Phrynosoma orbiculare Linnaeus, 1758

= Horned lizard =

Genus of reptiles

Phrynosoma, whose members are known as the horned lizards, horny toads, or horntoads, is a genus of North American lizards and the type genus of the family Phrynosomatidae. Their common names refer directly to their horns or to their flattened, rounded bodies (squat bodied), and blunt snouts.

The generic name Phrynosoma means "toad-bodied". In common with true toads (amphibians of the family Bufonidae), horned lizards tend to move sluggishly, often remain motionless, and rely on their remarkable camouflage to avoid detection by predators. They are adapted to arid or semiarid areas. The spines on the lizard's back and sides are modified reptile scales, which prevent water loss through the skin, whereas the horns on the head are true horns (i.e., they have a bony core). A urinary bladder is absent. Of the 21 species of horned lizards, 15 are native to the US. The largest-bodied and most widely distributed of the American species is the Texas horned lizard.

== Biology ==
=== Rain-harvesting ===
Like the unrelated thorny devil (Moloch horridus) which also lives in arid environments, some species of horned lizards exhibit a behaviour known as "rain-harvesting". As rain falls on the scales of a lizard's back, water is passively transported through channels to its mouth by capillary action. The extent of this ability varies between species of horned lizards.

=== Defenses ===
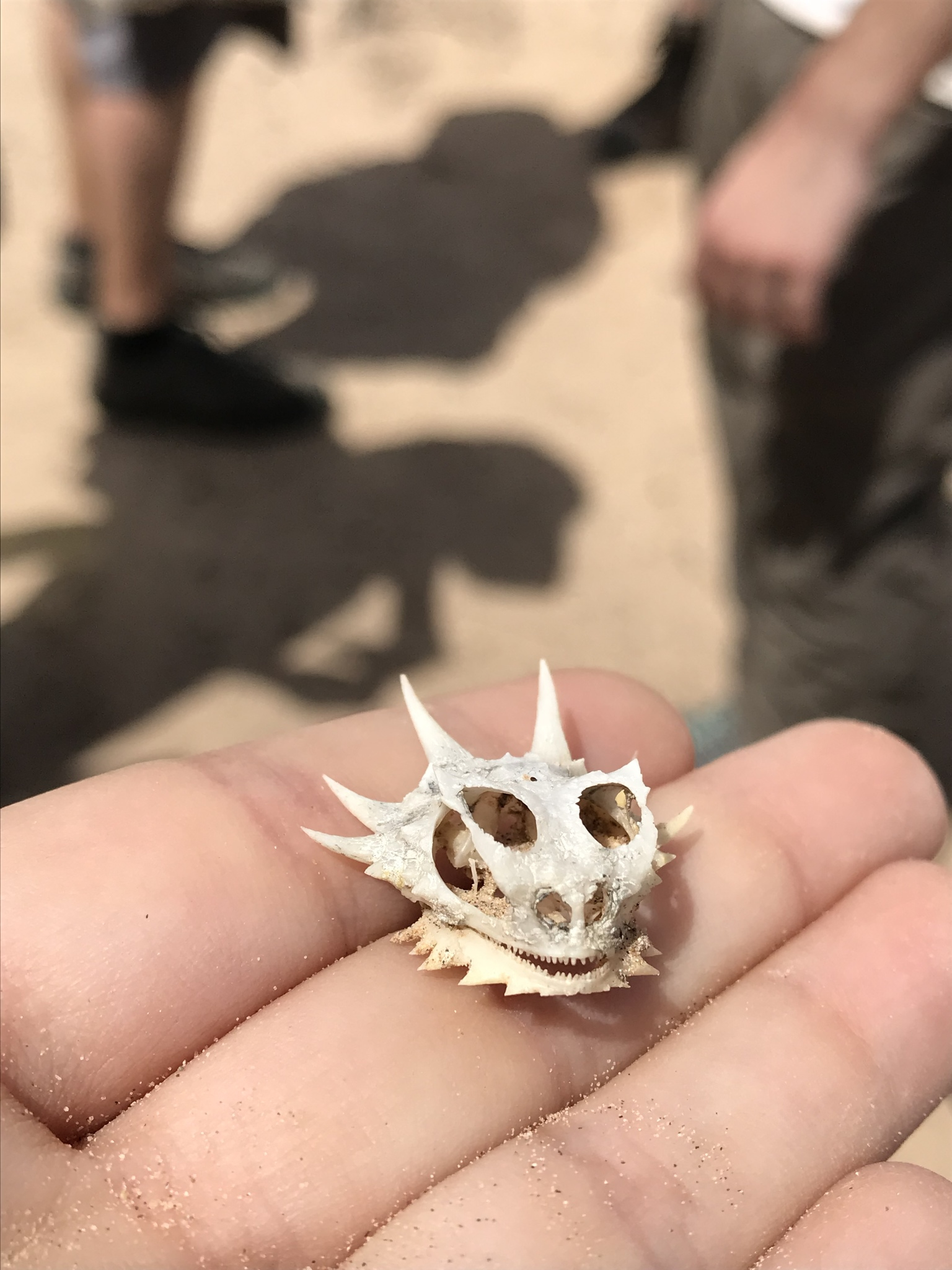
Phrynosoma mcallii skull

Horned lizards use a variety of means to avoid predation. Their coloration generally serves as camouflage. When threatened, their first defense is to remain motionless to avoid detection. If approached too closely, they generally run in short bursts and stop abruptly to confuse the predator's visual acuity. If this fails, they puff up their bodies to cause them to appear more horned and larger so that they are more difficult to swallow.

To avoid being picked up by the head or neck, a horned lizard ducks or elevates its head and orients its cranial horns straight up, or back. If a predator tries to take it by the body, the lizard drives that side of its body down into the ground so the predator cannot easily get its lower jaw underneath.

==== Blood-squirting ====
At least eight species (P. asio, P. cornutum, P. coronatum, P. ditmarsi, P. hernandesi, P. orbiculare, P. solare, and P. taurus) are also able to squirt an aimed stream of blood from the corners of the eyes for a distance up to 5 ft (1.5 m). They do this by restricting the blood flow leaving the head, thereby increasing blood pressure and rupturing tiny vessels around the eyelids. The blood not only confuses predators but also tastes foul to canine and feline predators. It appears to have no effect against predatory birds. Only three closely related species (P. mcallii, P. modestum, and P. platyrhinos) are certainly known to either be unable to squirt blood or only do it extremely rarely.

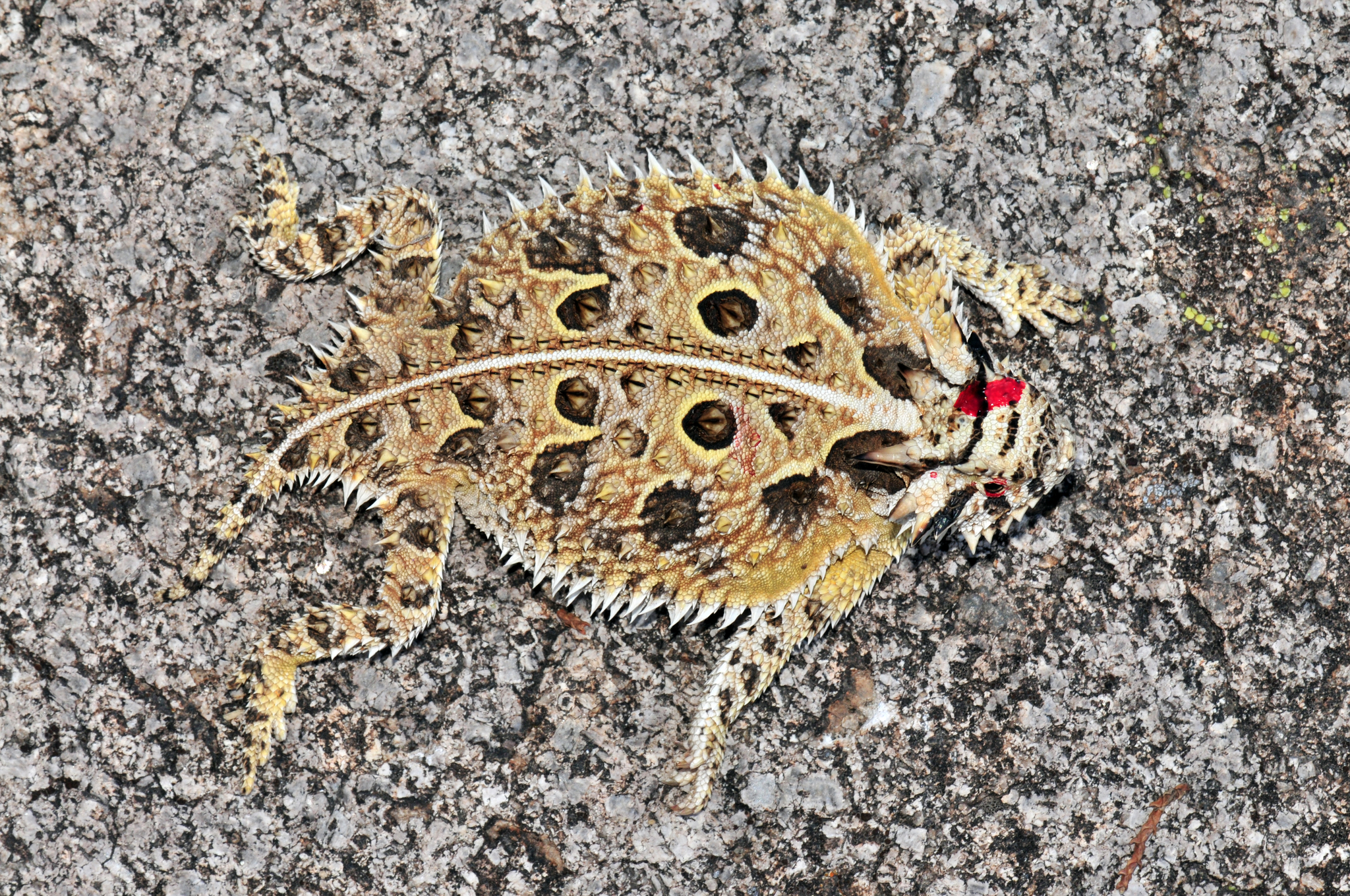
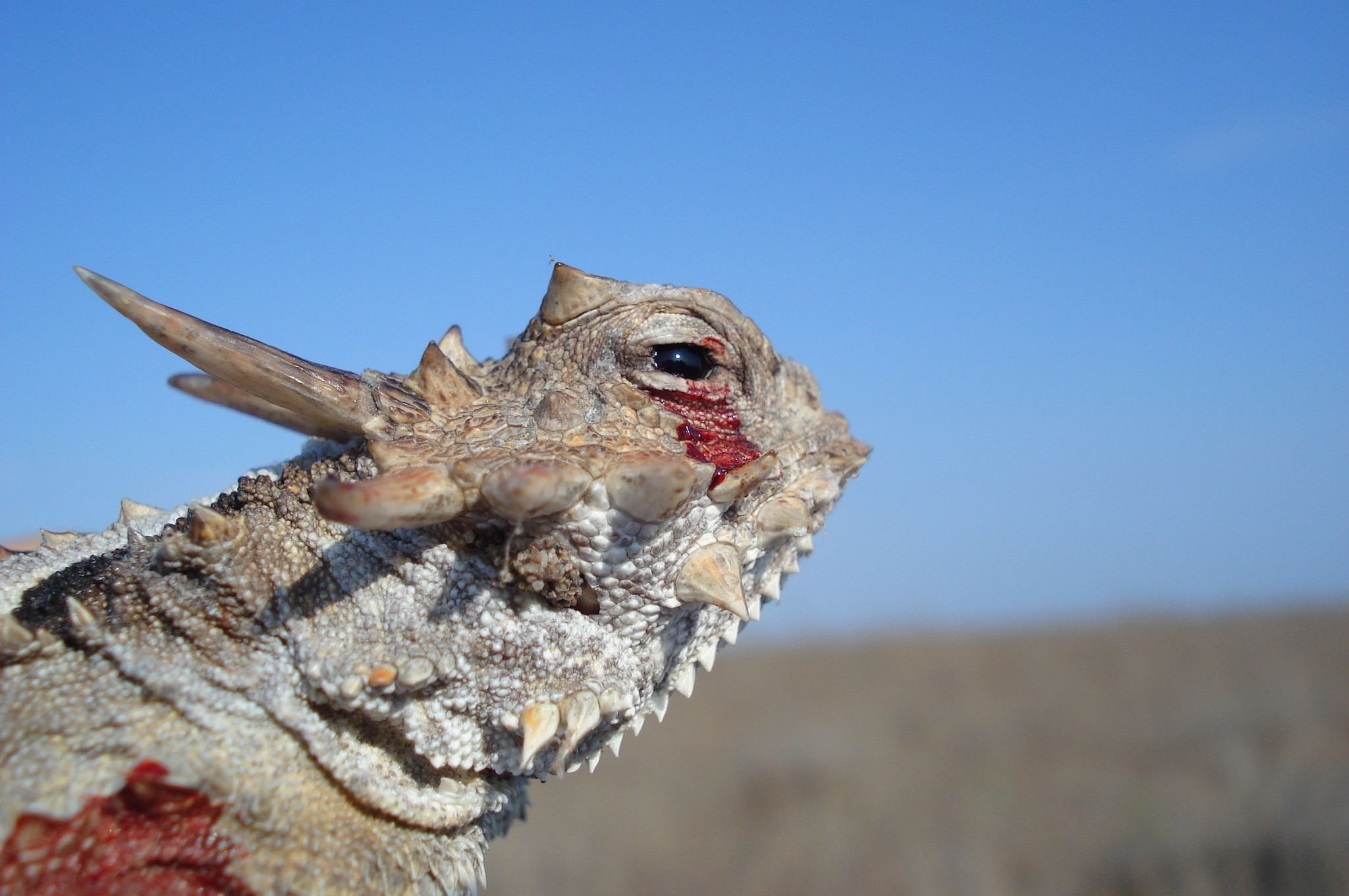
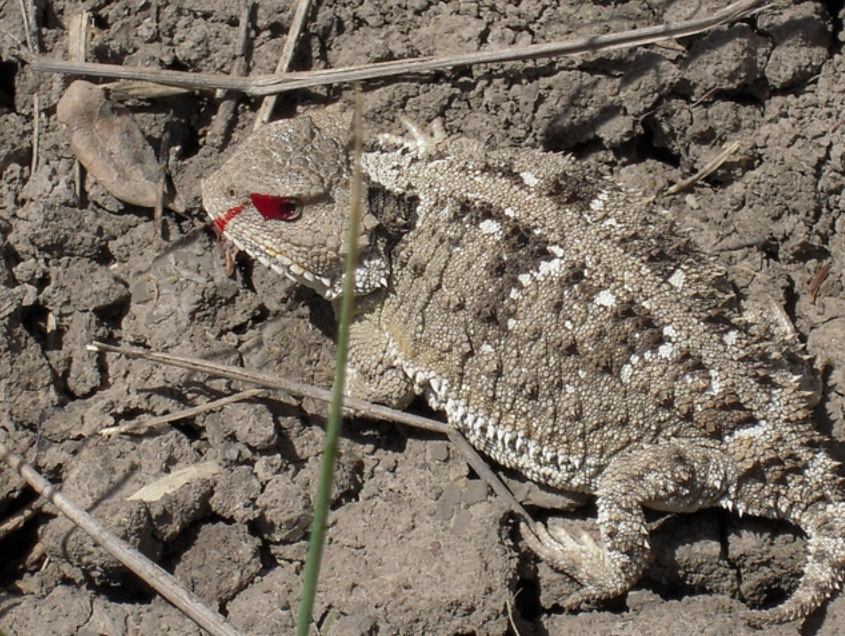
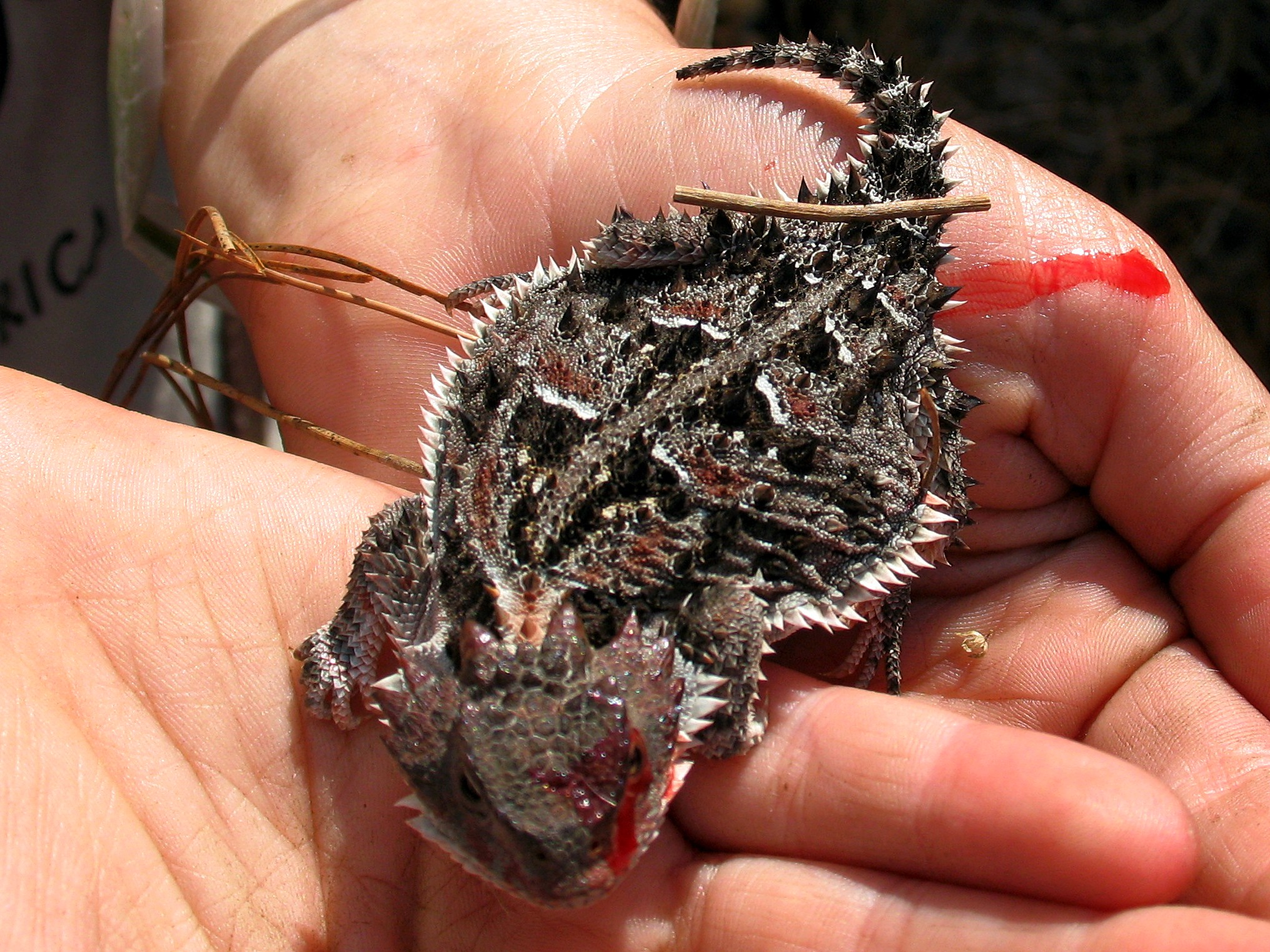
Autohaemorrhaging in P. cornutum, P. coronatum, P. hernandesi, and P. orbiculare (from left to right)

While previous thought held that compounds were added to the blood from glands in the ocular sinus cavity, current research has shown that the chemical compounds that make up the defense are already in the circulating blood. It is possible that their diet of large quantities of venomous harvester ants could be a factor; however, the origin and structure of the chemicals responsible are still unknown. The blood-squirting mechanism increases survival after contact with canine predators; the trait may provide an evolutionary advantage. Ocular autohemorrhaging has also been documented in other lizards, which suggests blood-squirting could have evolved from a less extreme defense in the ancestral branch of the genus. Recent phylogenic research supports this claim, so the species incapable of squirting blood apparently have lost the adaptation for reasons yet unstudied.

== Population decline ==
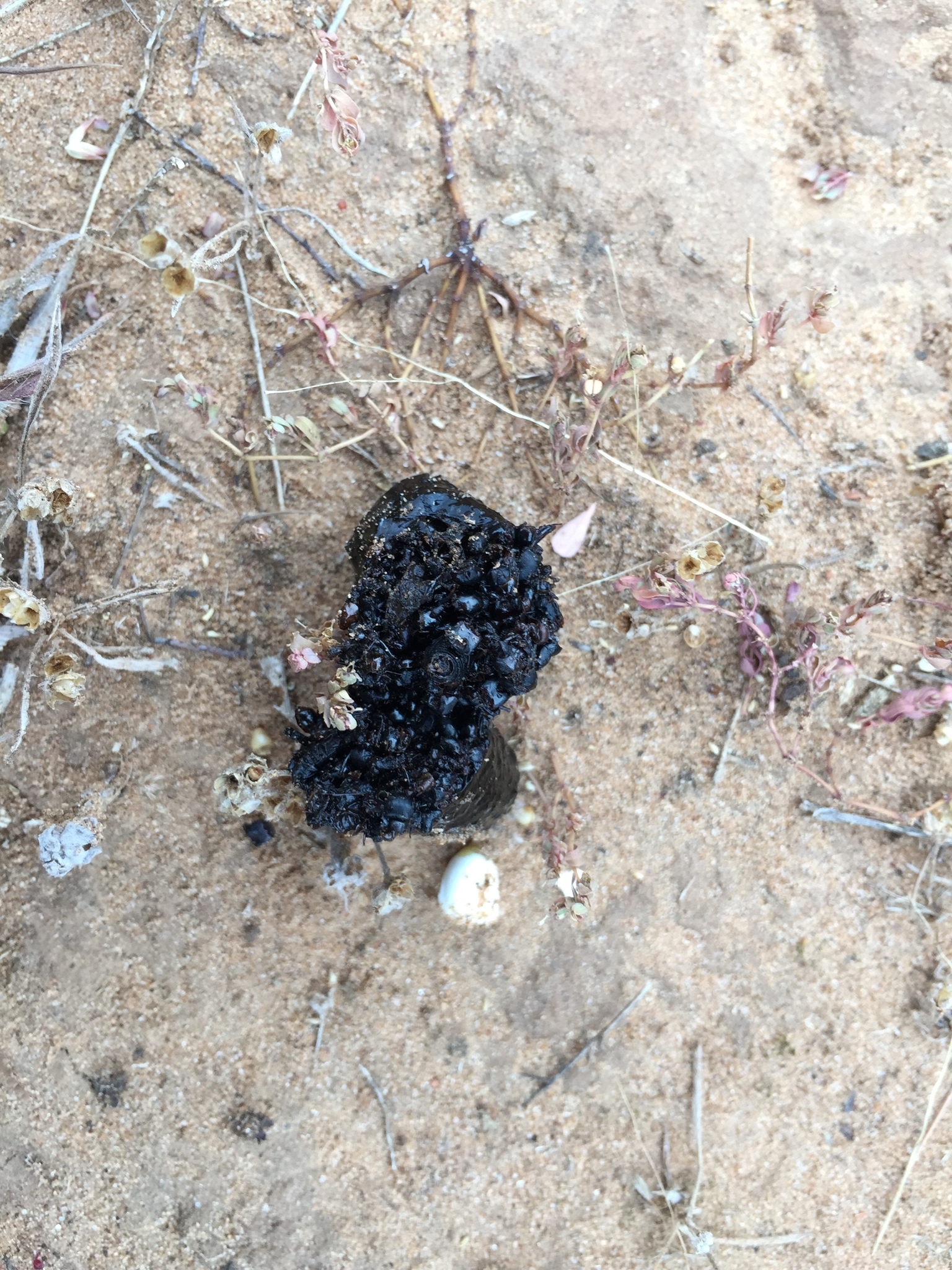
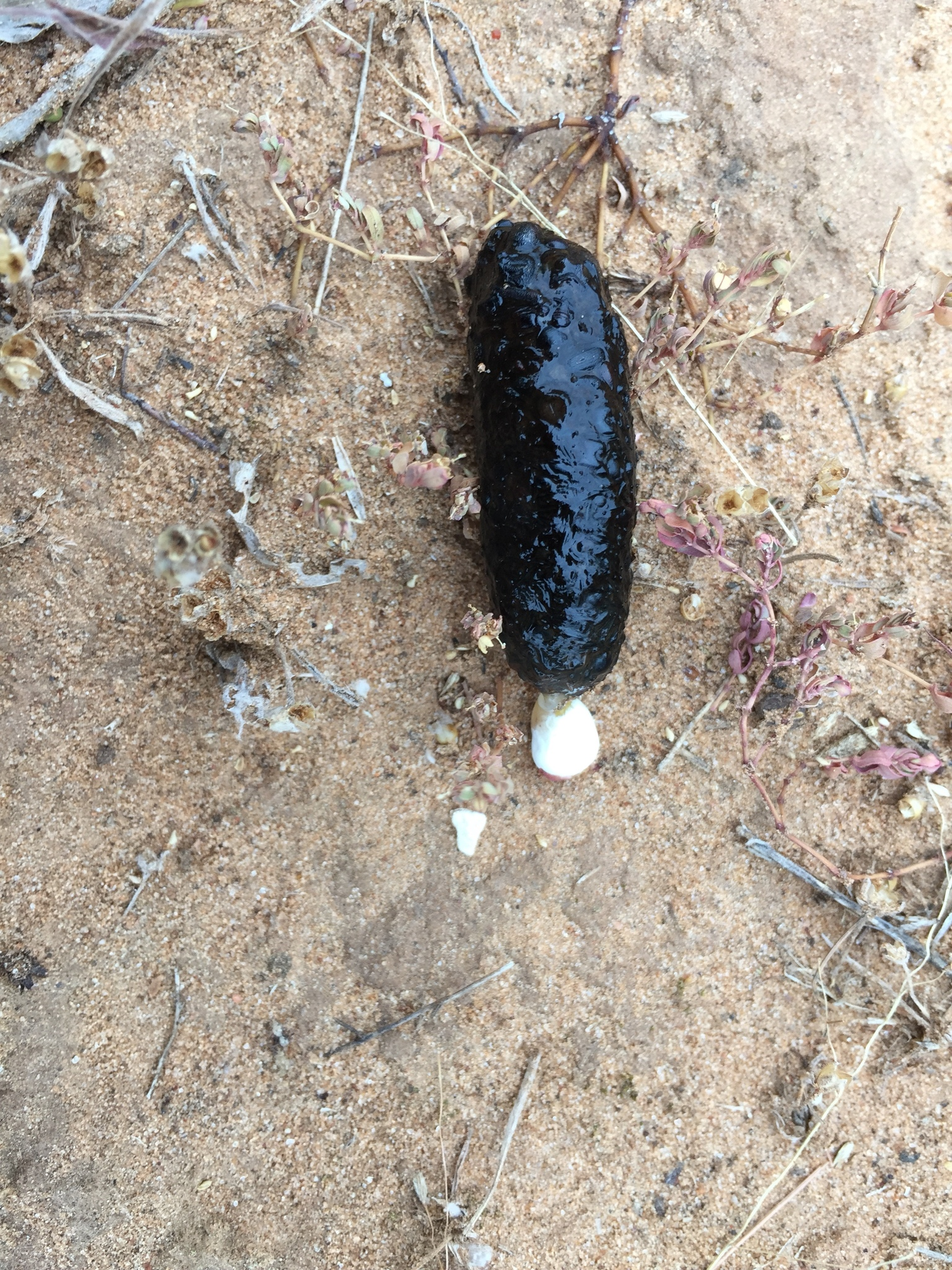
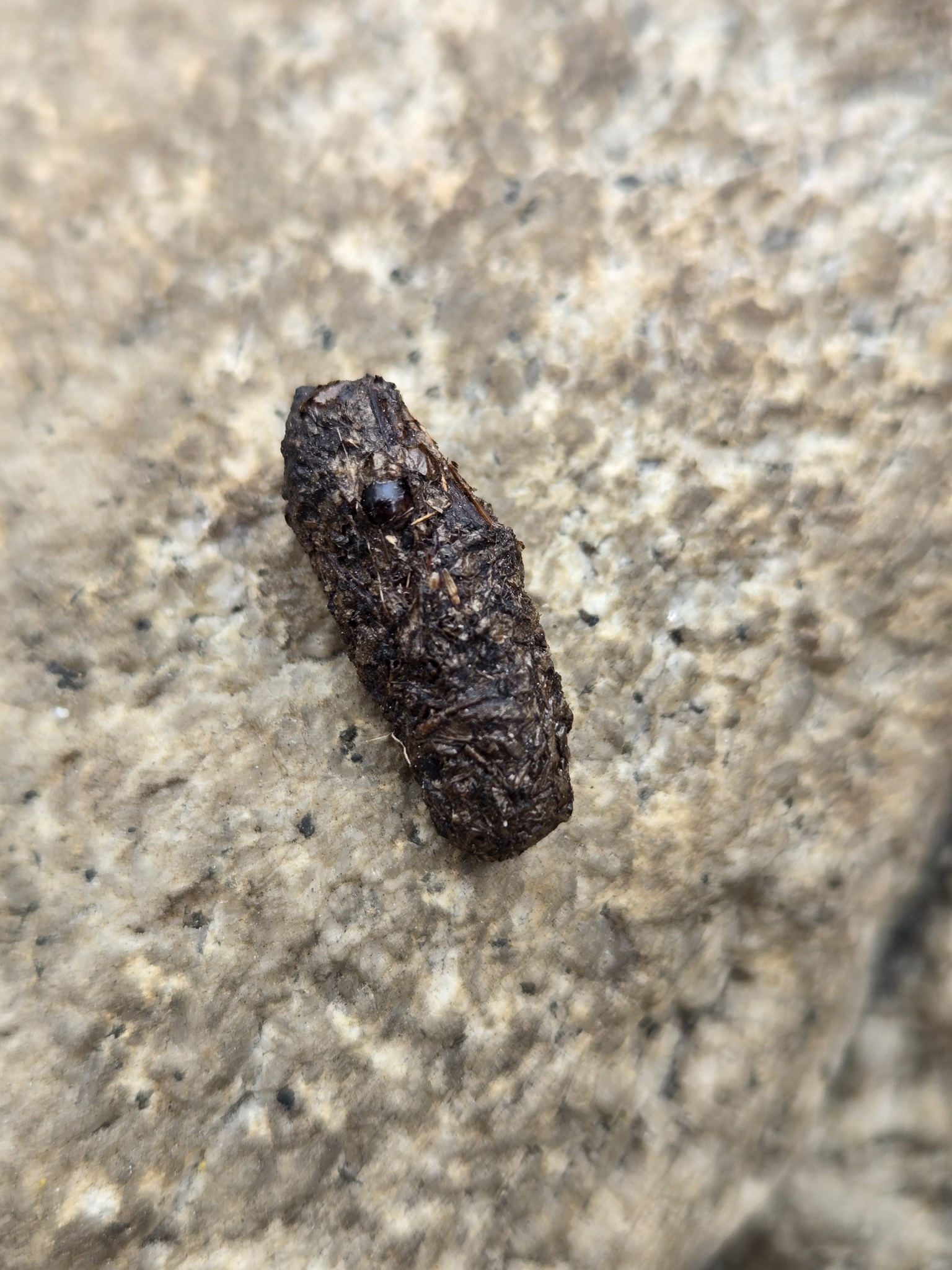
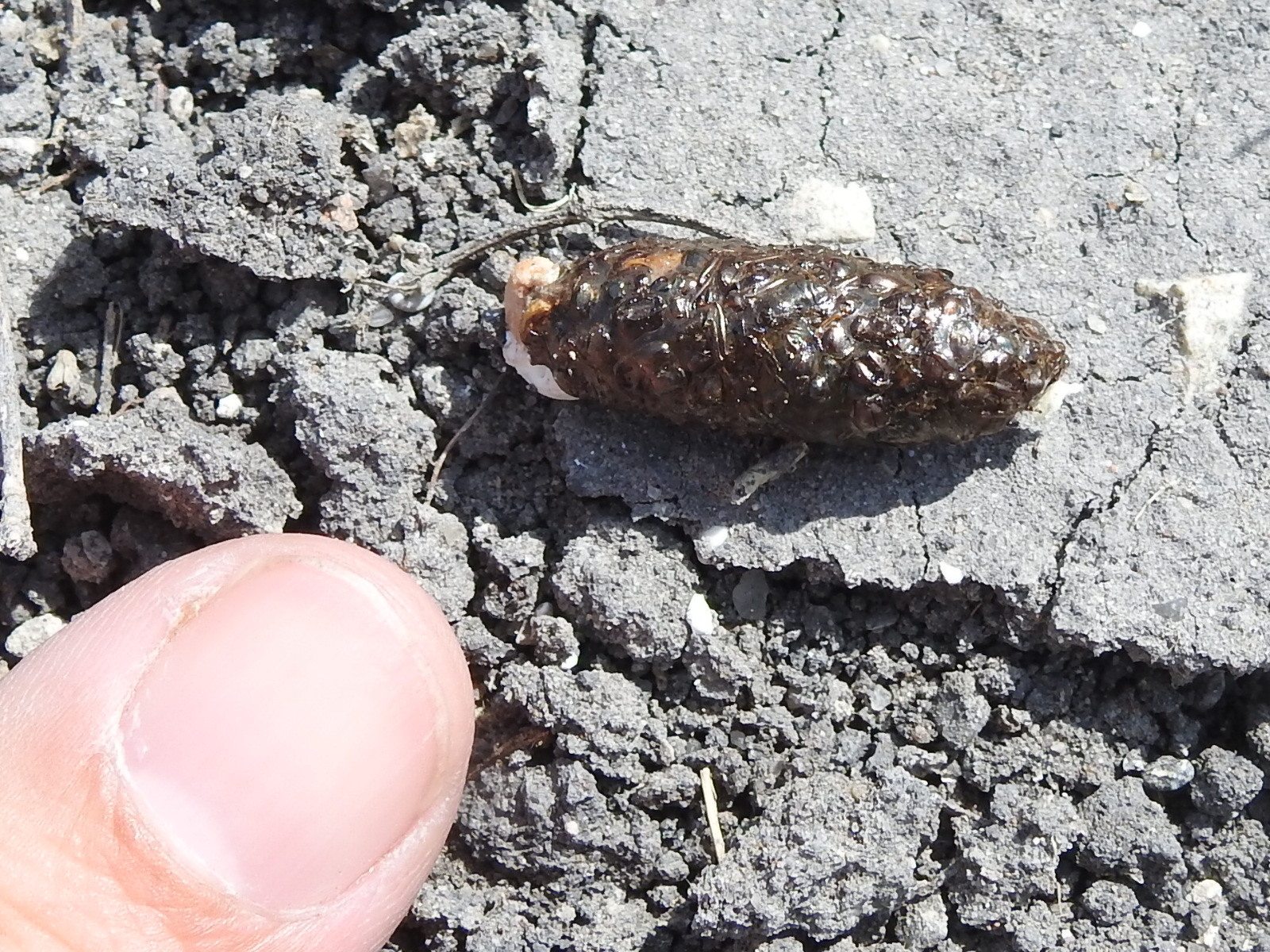
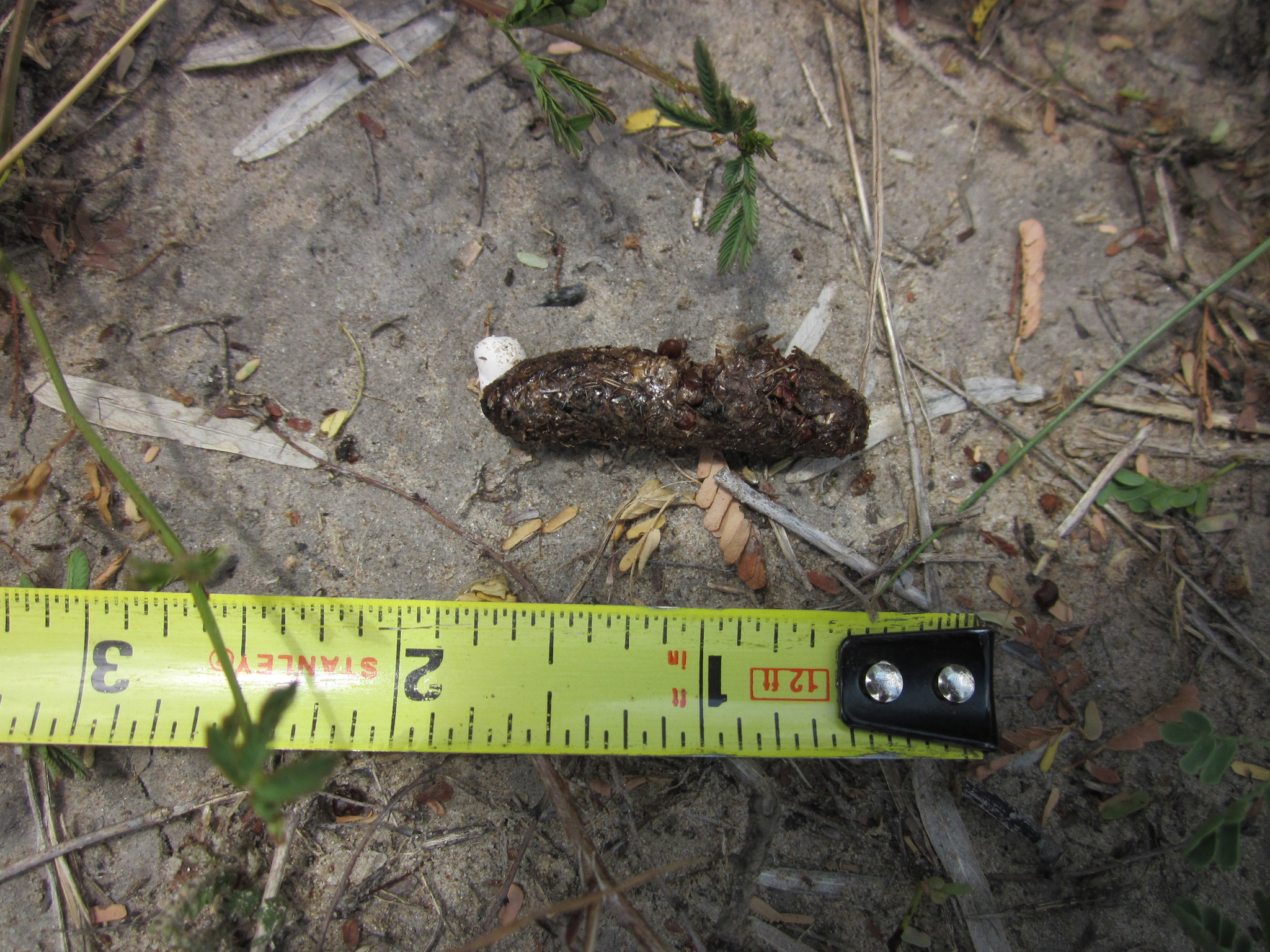
Horned lizards have distinctive scat from their myrmecophagous diet

A University of Texas publication notes that horned lizard populations continue to disappear throughout their distribution despite protective legislation. Population declines are attributed to a number of factors, including the fragmentation and loss of habitat from real estate development and road construction, the planting of non-native grasses (both suburban and rural), conversion of native land to pastureland and agricultural uses, and pesticides. Additionally predation by domestic dogs and cats place continued pressure upon horned lizards.

Fire ants (Solenopsis invicta), introduced from South America via the nursery industry's potted plants, pose a significant threat to all wildlife including horned lizards. Phrynosoma species do not eat fire ants. Fire ants kill many species of wildlife, and are fierce competitors against the native ants, which horned lizards require for food (with their specialized nutritional content). Fire ants, and human attempts to eradicate ants, including invasive species and the native species on which the lizards prey, contribute to the continued displacement of native ant species and the decline of horned lizards.

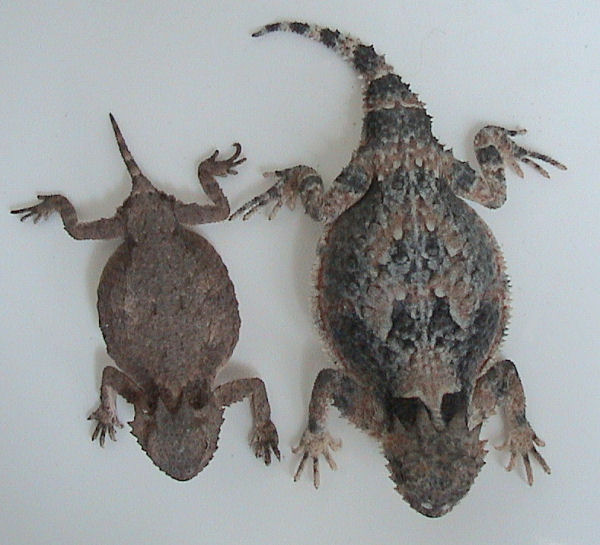
Comparison of P. modestum and P. platyrhinos

The Texas horned lizard (Phrynosoma cornutum) has disappeared from almost half of its geographic range. Their popularity in the early to mid-20th-century pet trade, where collectors took thousands from the wild populations to sell to pet distributors, without provision for their highly specialized nutritional needs (primarily formic acid from harvester ants), resulted in certain death for almost all the collected lizards. In 1967, the state of Texas passed protective legislation preventing the collection, exportation, and sale of Phrynosoma, and by the early 1970s, most states enacted similar laws to protect and conserve horned lizards in the US. As recently as the early 2000s, though, the state of Nevada still allowed commercial sale of Phrynosoma species. Despite limited federal protection in Mexico, horned lizards are still offered in Mexican "pet" markets throughout the country.

In 2014, the Center for Biological Diversity in Tucson petitioned the Oklahoma Department of Wildlife Conservation to have the Texas horned lizard put on the endangered species list due to the massive decline of its population in Oklahoma, where it was once plentiful. The center said it may later seek protection for the animal on a federal level; it also said that reptiles in general are dying off at up to 10,000 times their historic extinction rate, greatly due to human influences.

== Species and subspecies ==
The following 21 species (listed alphabetically by scientific name) are recognized as being valid by the Reptile Database, three species of which have recognized subspecies:

Image	Common name	Scientific name		Distribution
	Giant horned lizard	Phrynosoma asio Cope, 1864		southern Mexico
	Baur's short-horned lizard	Phrynosoma bauri Montanucci, 2015 (disputed, may be conspecific with P. hernandesi)		United States (southern Wyoming and Nebraska south through eastern Colorado to northern New Mexico)
	San Diego horned lizard, Blainville's horned lizard	Phrynosoma blainvillii Gray, 1839		United States (southern and central California), Mexico (northern Baja California)
	Short-tailed horned lizard	Phrynosoma braconnieri A.H.A. Duméril, 1870		Mexico (Puebla and Oaxaca)
	Great Plains short-horned lizard	Phrynosoma brevirostris (Girard, 1858) (disputed, may be conspecific with P. hernandesi)		Canada and the United States
	Cedros Island horned lizard	Phrynosoma cerroense Stejneger, 1893		Mexico (Cedros Island)
	Texas horned lizard	Phrynosoma cornutum (Harlan, 1825)		United States (southeast Colorado, central and southern areas of Kansas, central and western areas of Oklahoma and Texas, southeast New Mexico, and extreme southeast Arizona), Mexico (eastern Sonora, most of Chihuahua, northeast Durango, northern Zacatecas and San Luis Potosí, and throughout most of Coahuila, Nuevo León, and Tamaulipas)
	Coast horned lizard	Phrynosoma coronatum (Blainville, 1835)	Cape horned lizard, P. c. coronatum (Blainville, 1835); California horned lizard, P. c. frontale Van Denburgh, 1894; Central peninsular horned lizard, P. c. jamesi Schmidt, 1922	Mexico (Baja California Sur)
	San Luis Valley short-horned lizard	Phrynosoma diminutum Montanucci, 2015 (disputed, may be conspecific with P. hernandesi)		United States (Colorado)
	Ditmars' horned lizard, rock horned lizard	Phrynosoma ditmarsi Stejneger, 1906		Mexico (Sonora), United States (Arizona)
	Pygmy short-horned lizard	Phrynosoma douglasii (Bell, 1828)		northwestern United States and adjacent southwestern Canada
	Sonoran horned lizard, Goode's desert horned lizard	Phrynosoma goodei Stejneger, 1893		United States (Arizona) and Mexico (Sonora)
	Greater short-horned lizard	Phrynosoma hernandesi Girard, 1858		southwestern United States and northwestern Mexico
	Flat-tail horned lizard	Phrynosoma mcallii (Hallowell, 1852)		United States and Mexico
	Roundtail horned lizard	Phrynosoma modestum Girard, 1852		United States (Texas, New Mexico eastern Arizona, southeastern Colorado), northcentral Mexico
	Mexican Plateau horned lizard, Chihuahua Desert horned lizard	Phrynosoma orbiculare (Linnaeus, 1758)	P. o. bradti Horowitz, 1955; P. o. cortezii (A.H.A. Duméril & Bocourt, 1870); P. o. dugesii (A.H.A. Duméril & Bocourt, 1870); P. o. orbiculare (Linnaeus, 1758); P. o. orientale Horowitz, 1955	Mexico (Chihuahua, Durango, Morelos, Nuevo León, Puebla, and Veracruz)
	Desert short-horned lizard	Phrynosoma ornatissimum (Girard, 1858) (disputed, may be conspecific with P. hernandesi)		Canada and the United States
	Desert horned lizard	Phrynosoma platyrhinos Girard, 1852	Southern desert horned lizard, P. p. calidiarum (Cope, 1896); Northern desert horned lizard, P. p. platyrhinos Girard, 1852	southern Idaho in the north to northern Mexico
	Guerreran horned lizard	Phrynosoma sherbrookei Nieto-Montes de Oca, Arenas-Moreno, Beltrán-Sánchez & Leaché, 2014		Mexico
	Regal horned lizard	Phrynosoma solare Gray, 1845		Arizona and Mexico
	Mexican horned lizard	Phrynosoma taurus Dugès, 1873		Mexico (Guerrero and Puebla)

Note: In the above list, a binomial authority or trinomial authority in parentheses indicates that the species or subspecies was originally described in a genus other than Phrynosoma.

== Gallery ==
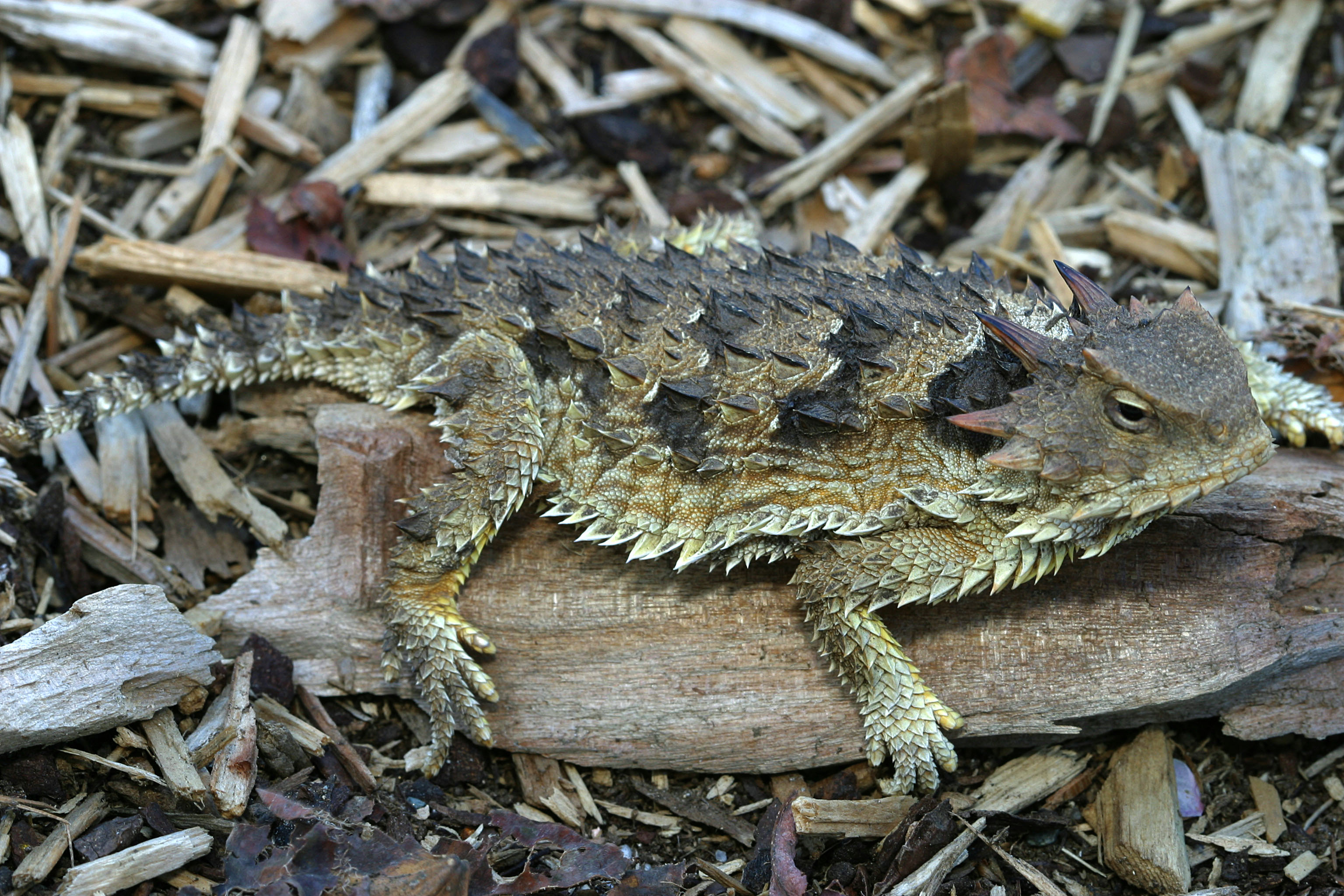
Blainville's horned lizard (P. blainvillii)

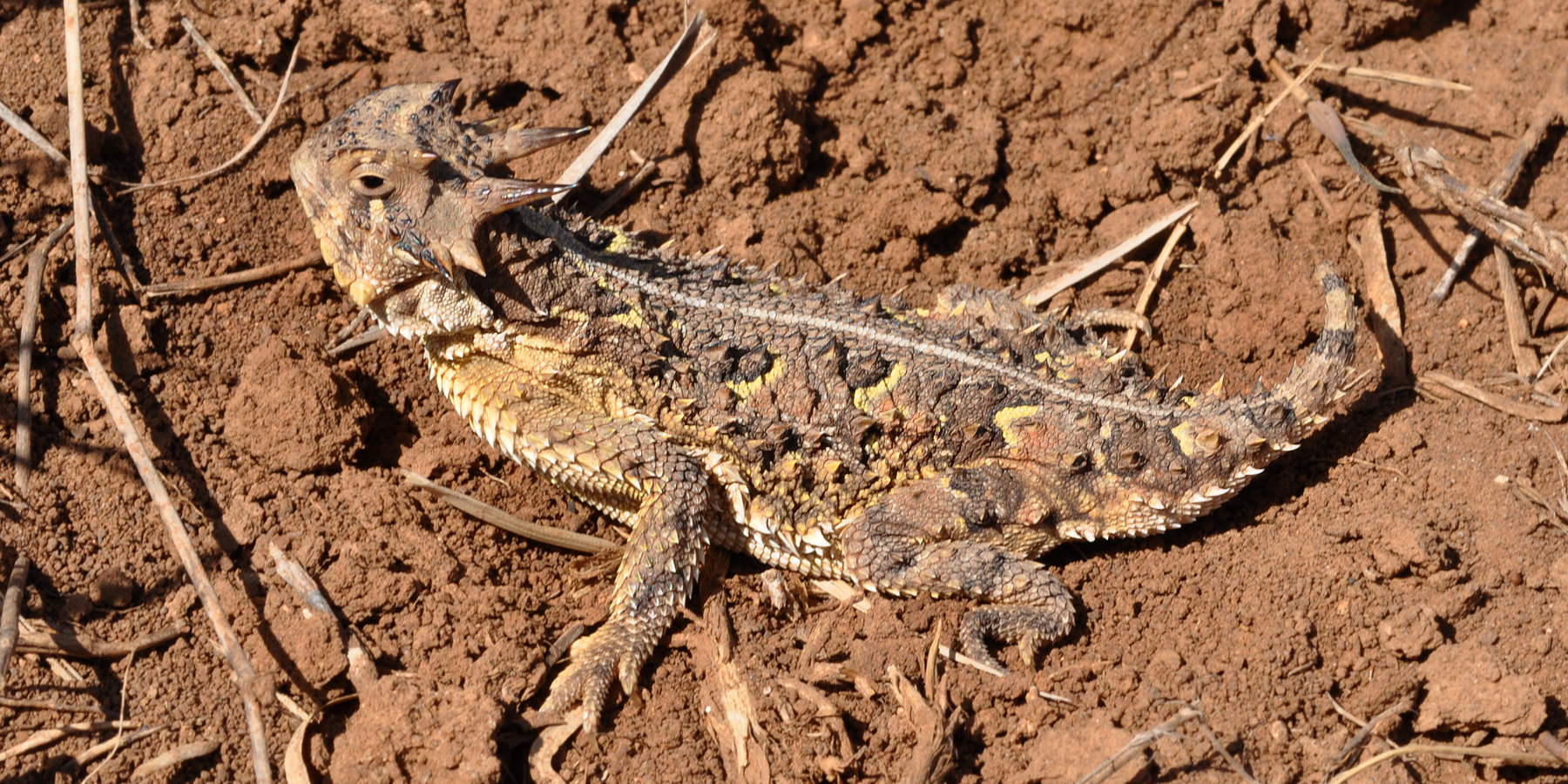
Texas horned lizard (P. cornutum), Texas, US

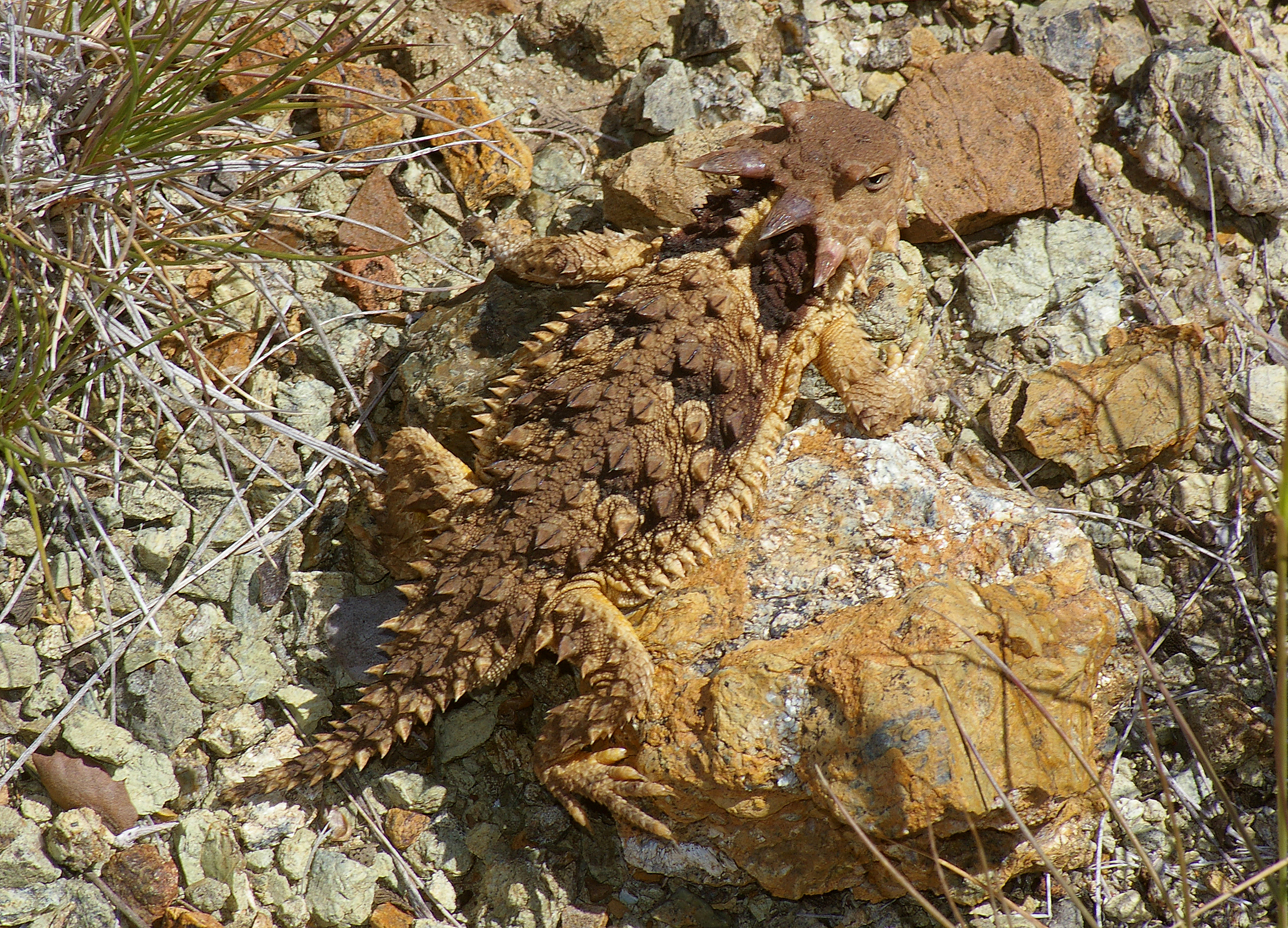
Coast horned lizard (P. coronatum), California, US

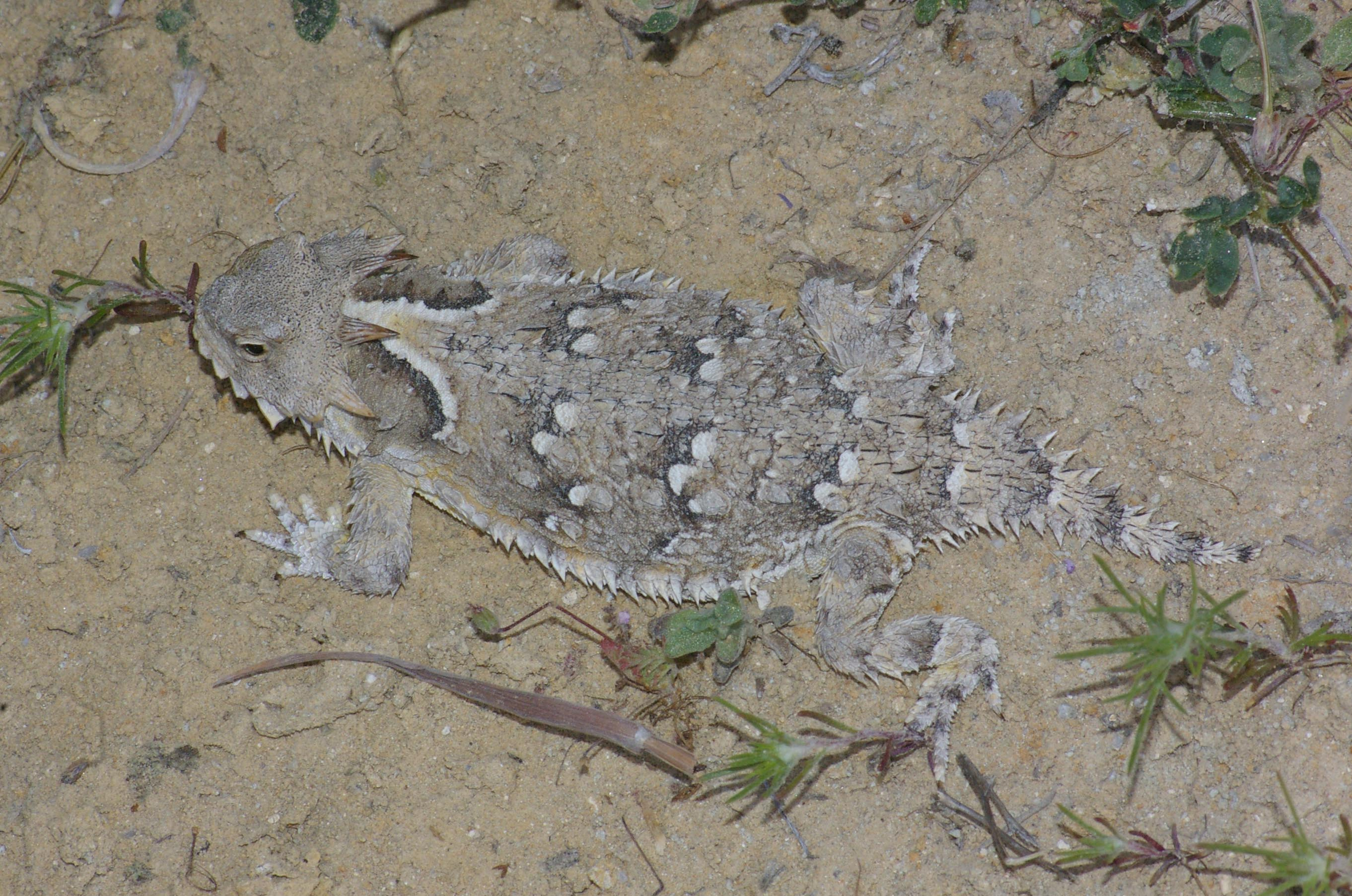
Coast horned lizard (P. coronatum)

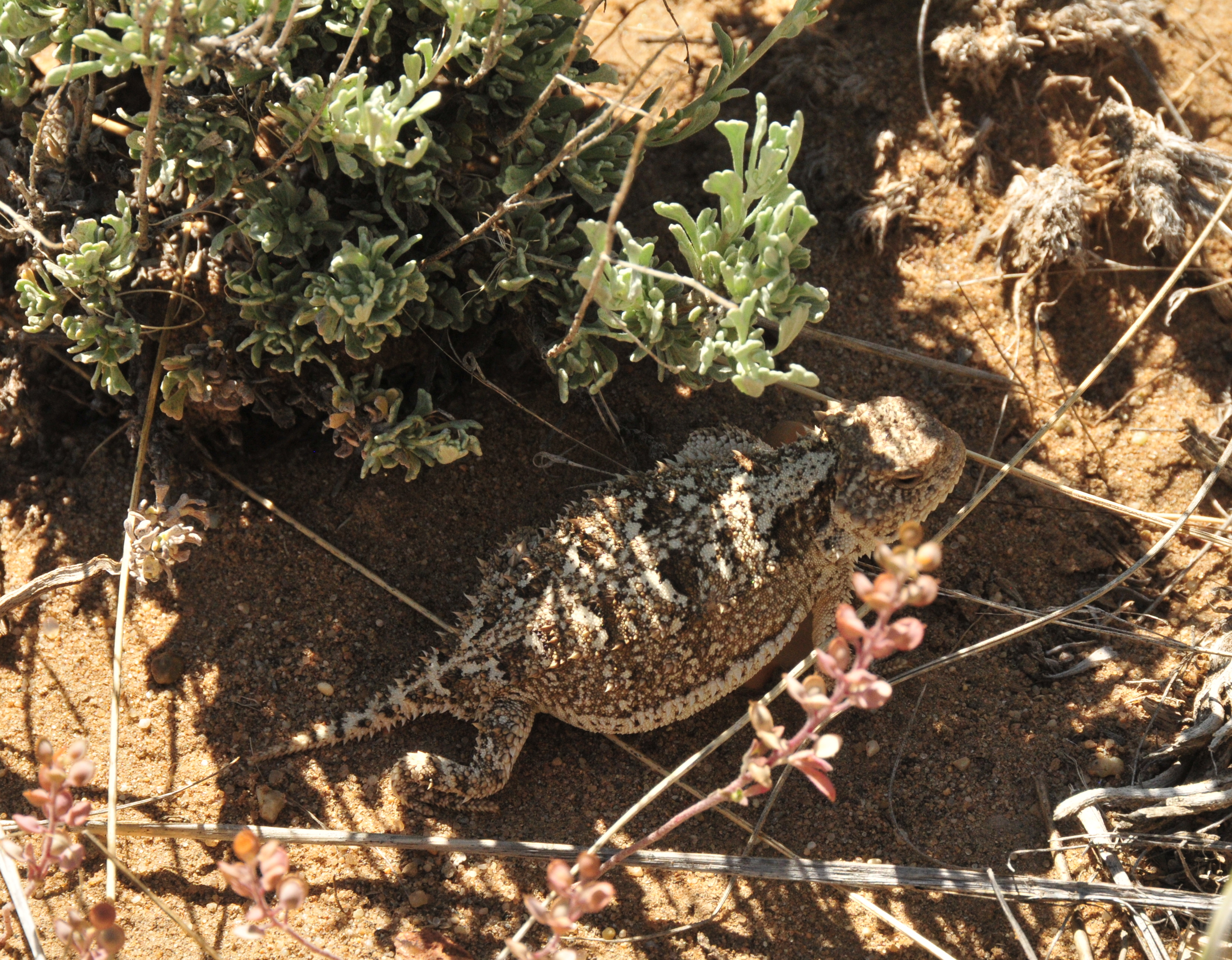
Greater short-horned lizard (P. douglassi brevirostre), Wyoming, US

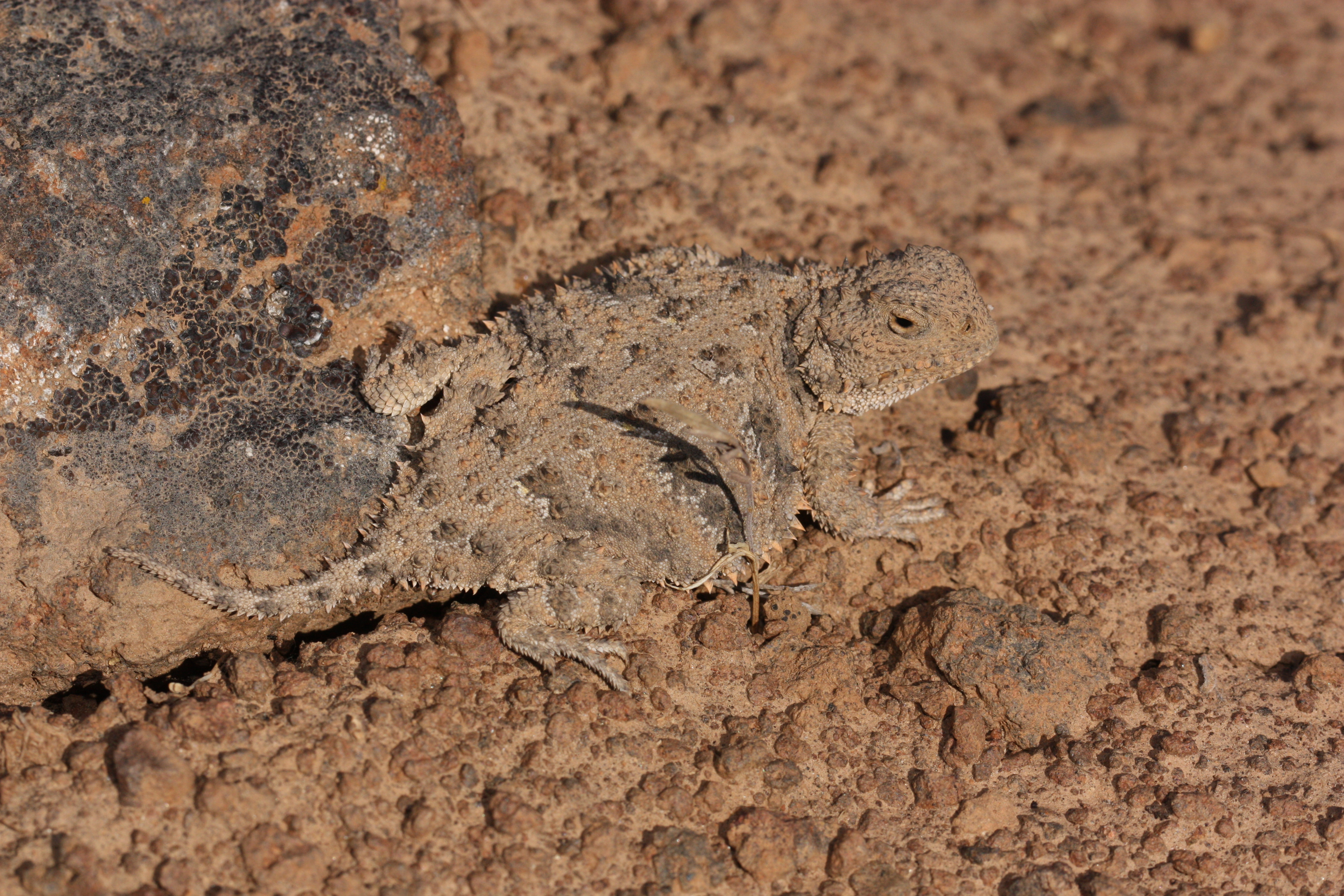
Pygmy short-horned lizard (P. douglasii), Washington, US

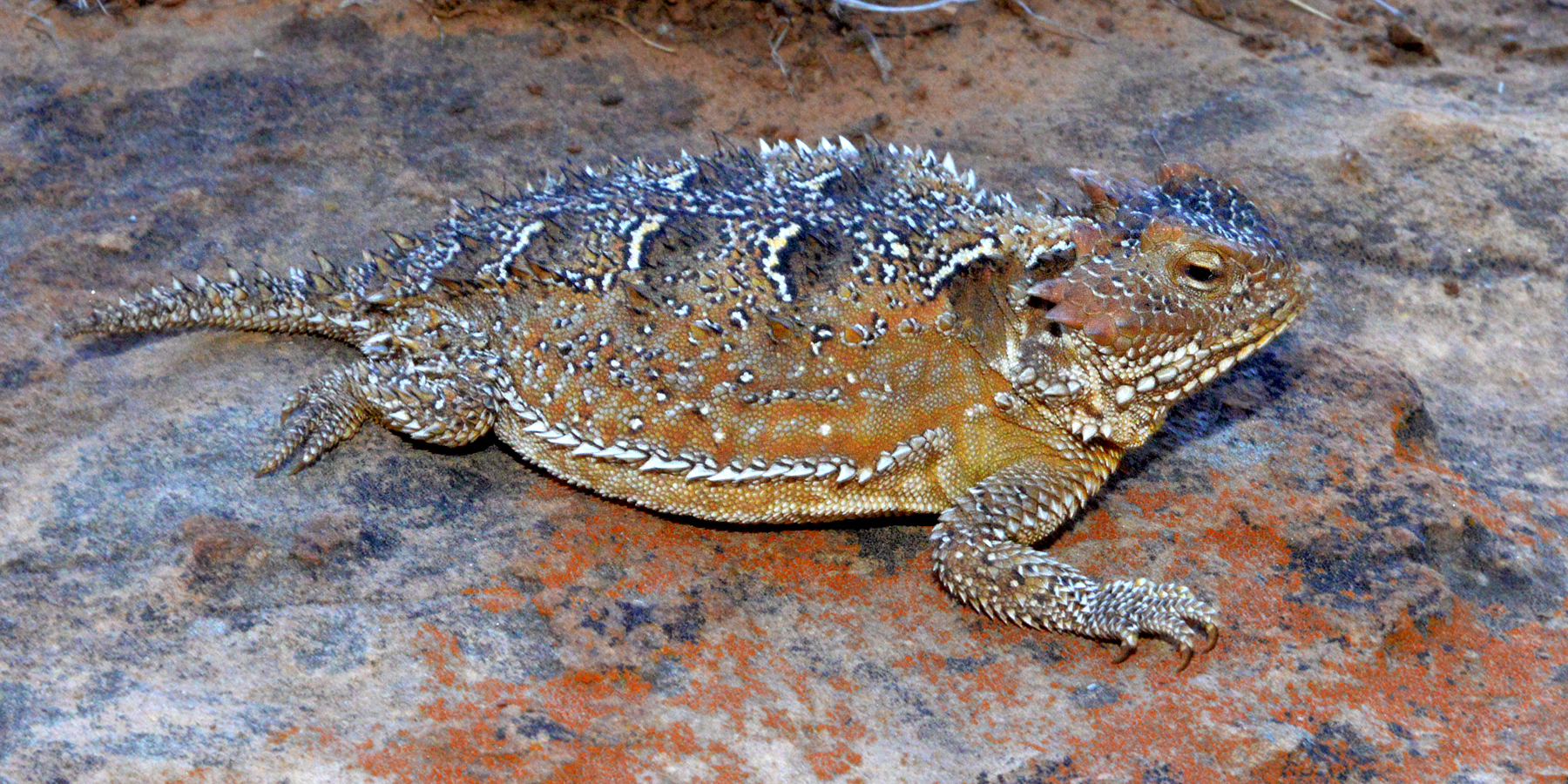
Mountain short-horned lizard (P. hernandesi), Texas, US

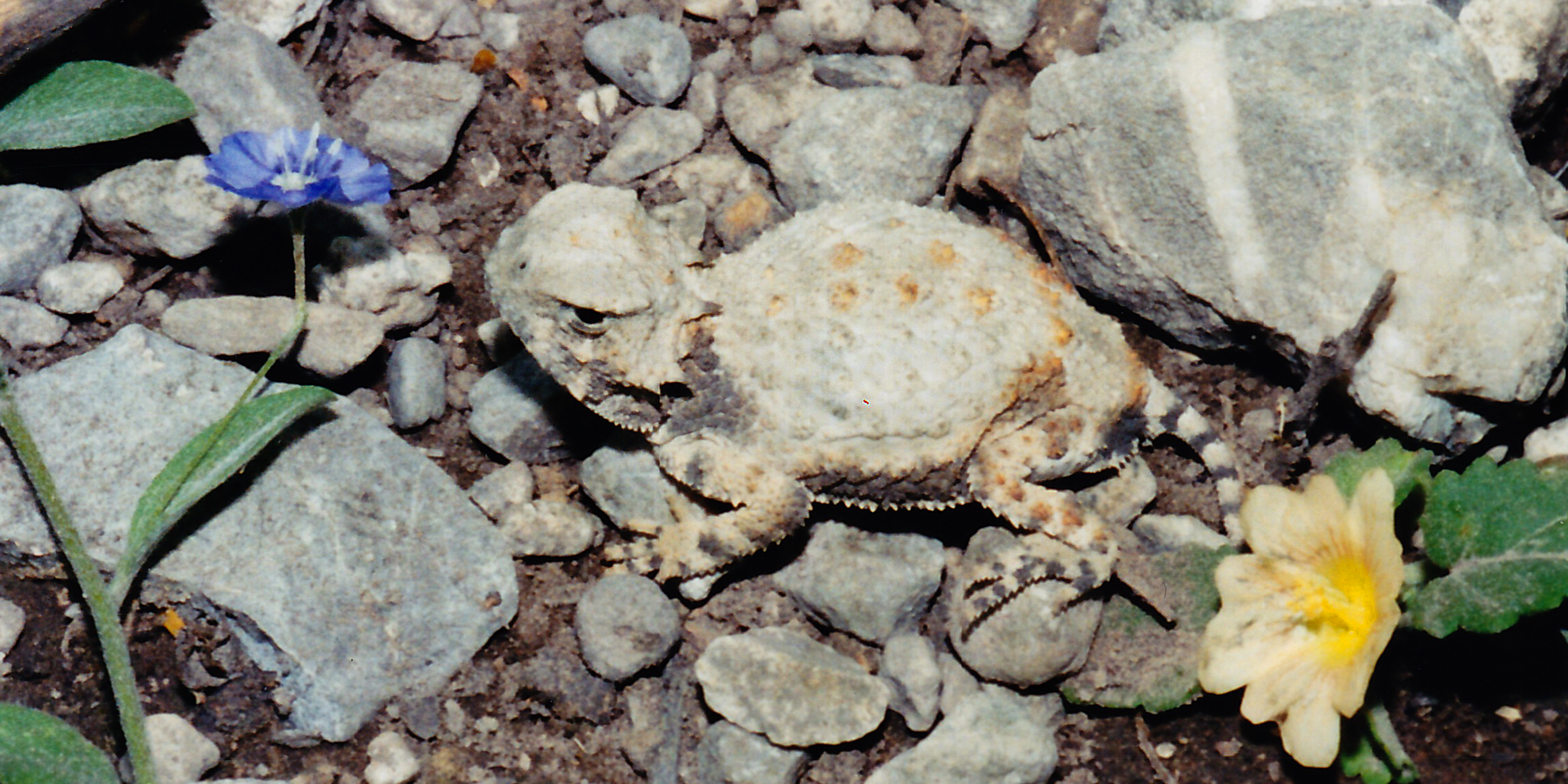
Round-tail horned lizard (P. modestum), Tamaulipas, Mexico

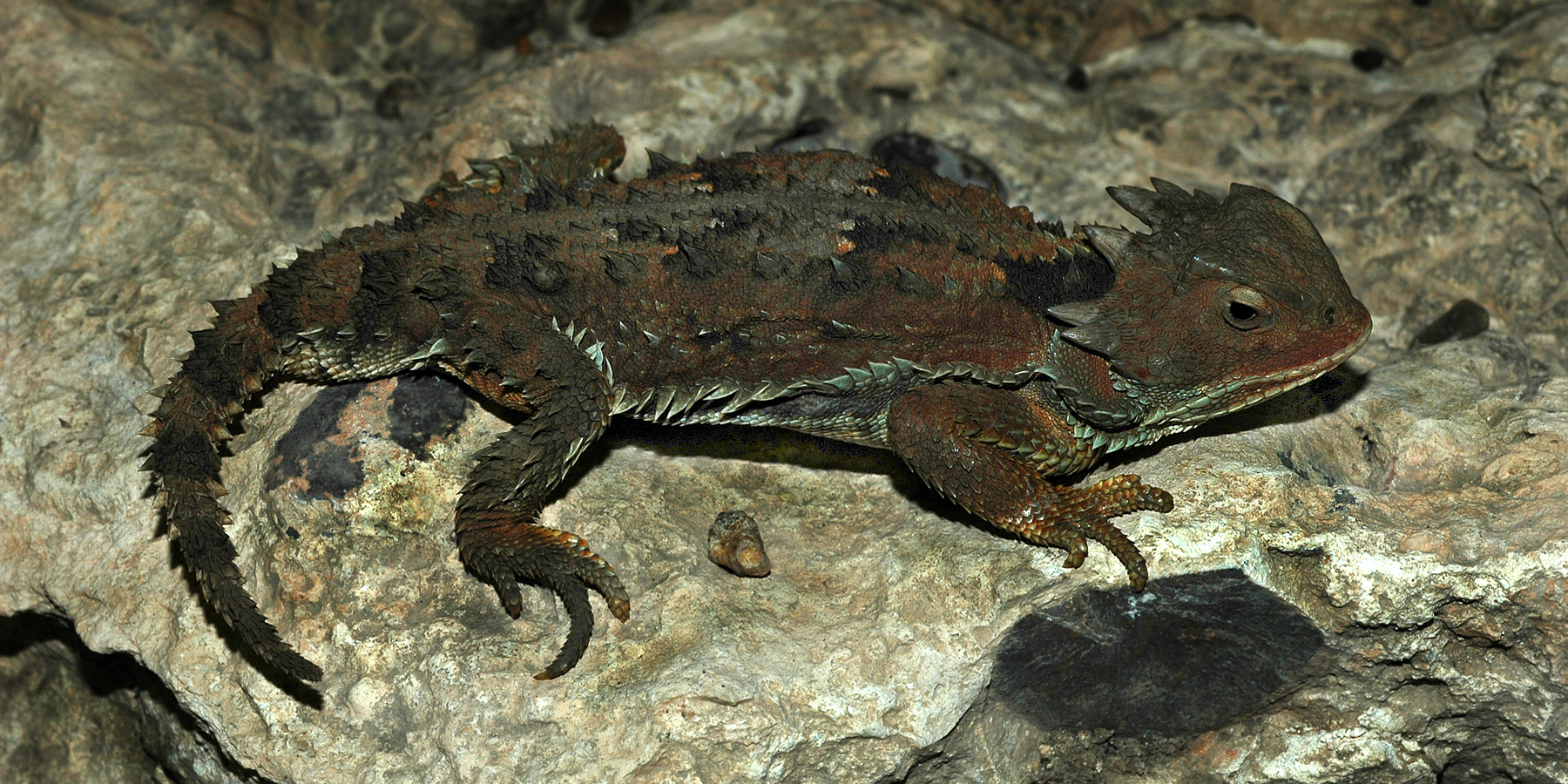
Mountain horned lizard (P. orbiculare orientale), Tamaulipas, Mexico

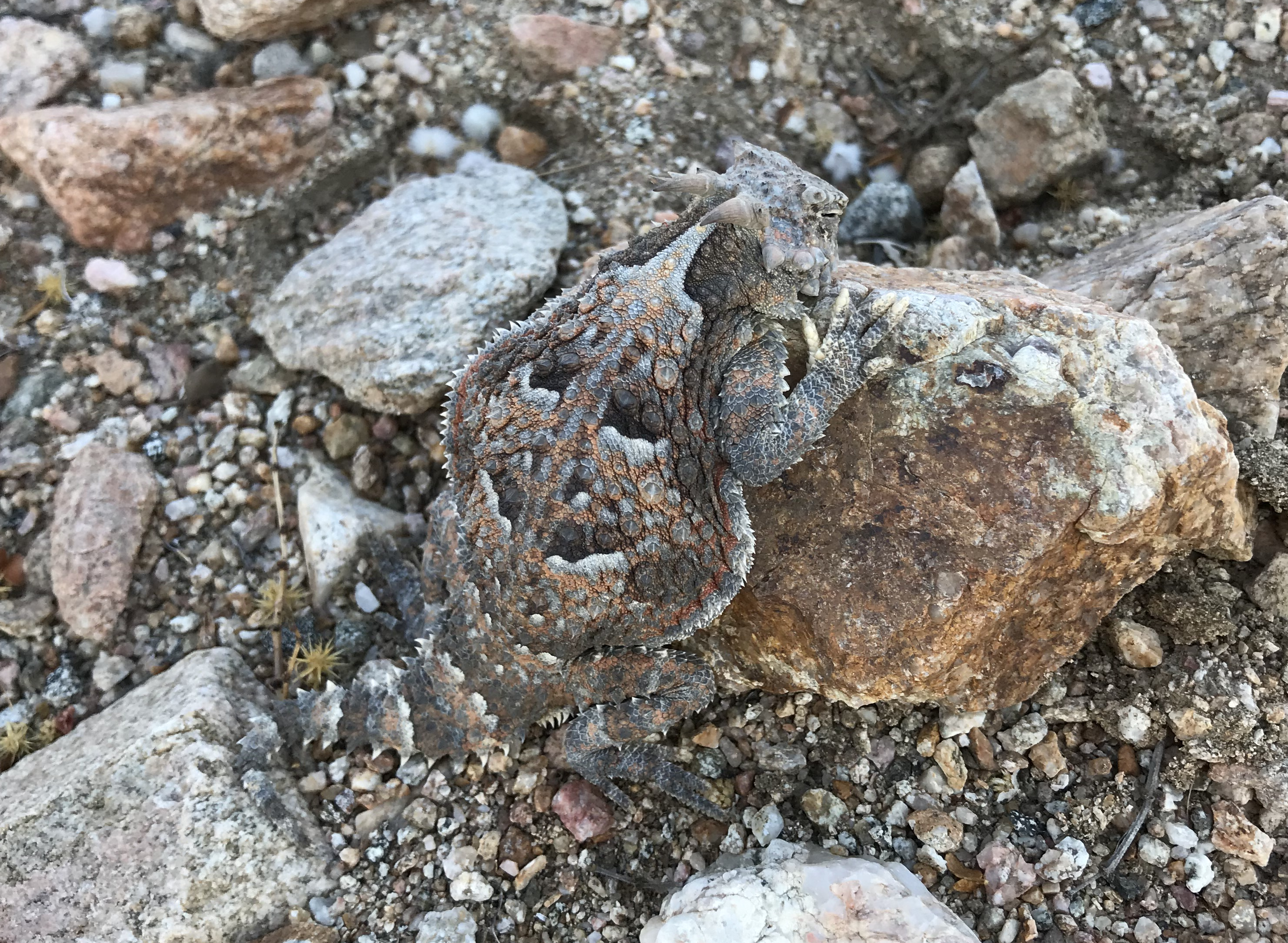
Desert horned lizard (P. platyrhinos), California, US

== In culture ==
Texas designated the Texas horned lizard (Phrynosoma cornutum) as the official state reptile in 1993. Wyoming’s state reptile is the “Horn Toad”, the greater short-horned lizard (Phrynosoma hernandesi).

The "TCU Horned Frog" is the mascot of Texas Christian University in Fort Worth, Texas. The "Horned Toad" is also the mascot for Coalinga High School in Coalinga, California. This school is located in Western Central California and its arid region is home to the San Diego Horned Lizard, which is protected. The City of Coalinga hosts an annual "Horned Toad Derby" on Memorial day weekend which features horned toad races, a carnival and parade.

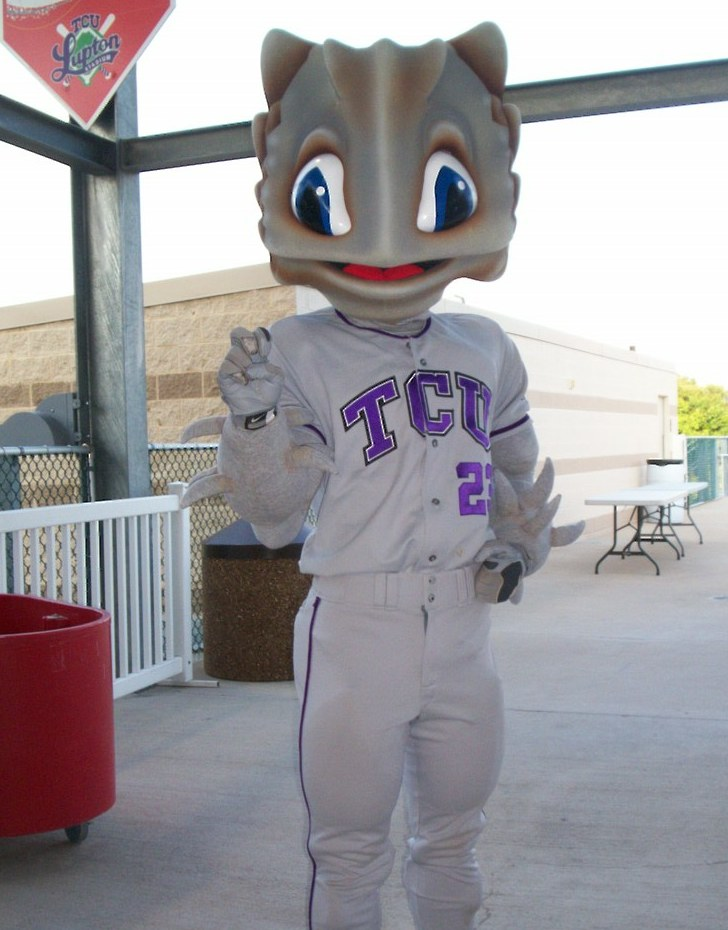
The TCU mascot is commonly known as Super Frog to TCU fans and students. He is usually present at TCU sporting events.

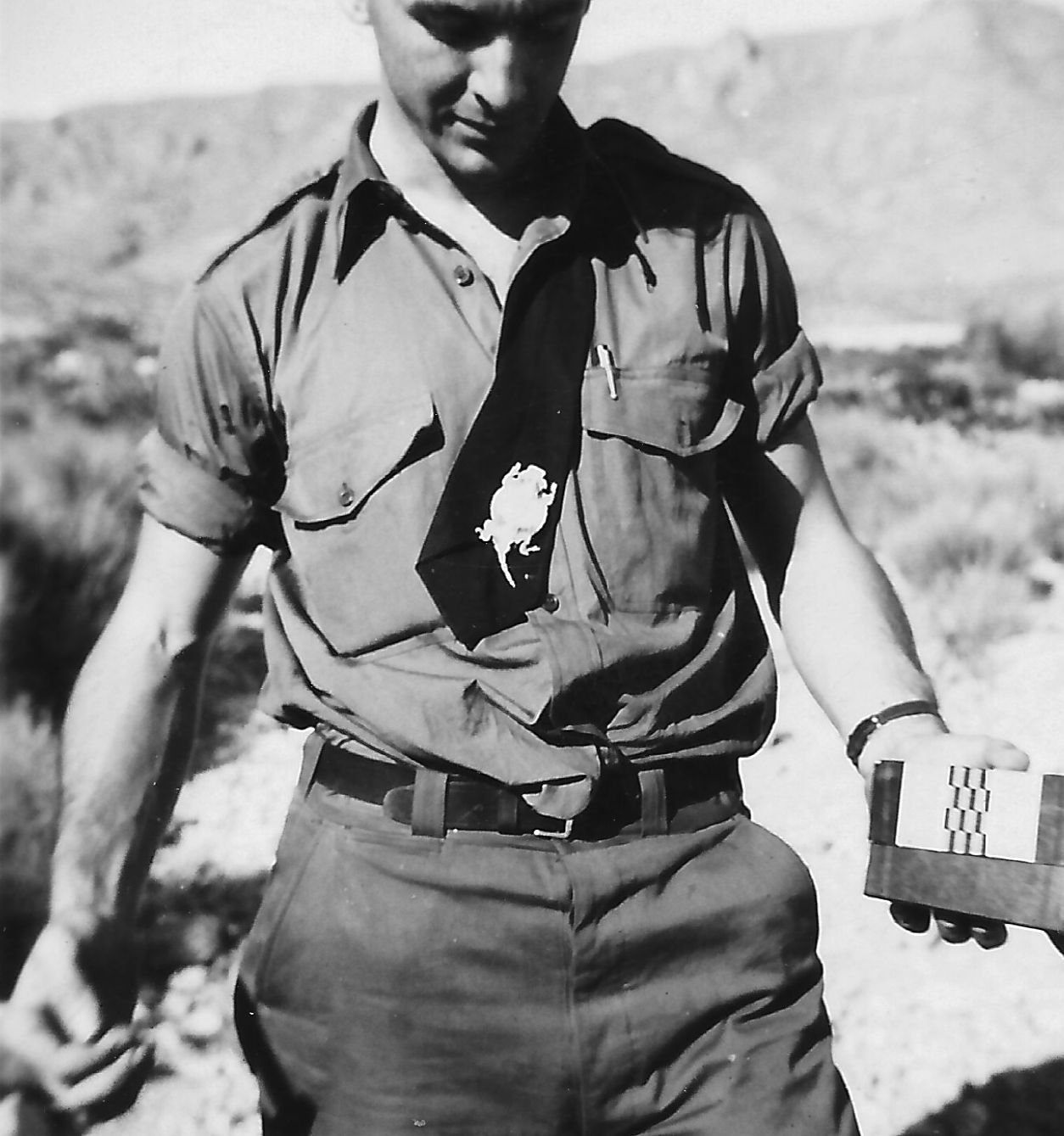
Horned lizard on a necktie at El Paso, Texas, in 1940
