= Guerreran horned lizard =

Scientific classification
- Kingdom: Animalia
- Phylum: Chordata
- Class: Reptilia
- Order: Squamata
- Suborder: Iguania
- Family: Phrynosomatidae
- Genus: Phrynosoma
- Species: P. sherbrookei

Binomial name
- Phrynosoma sherbrookei Nieto-Montes de Oca, Arenas-Moreno, Beltrán-Sánchez, & Leaché, 2014

Species of lizard

The Guerreran horned lizard (Phrynosoma sherbrookei) is a horned lizard species native to Mexico.
