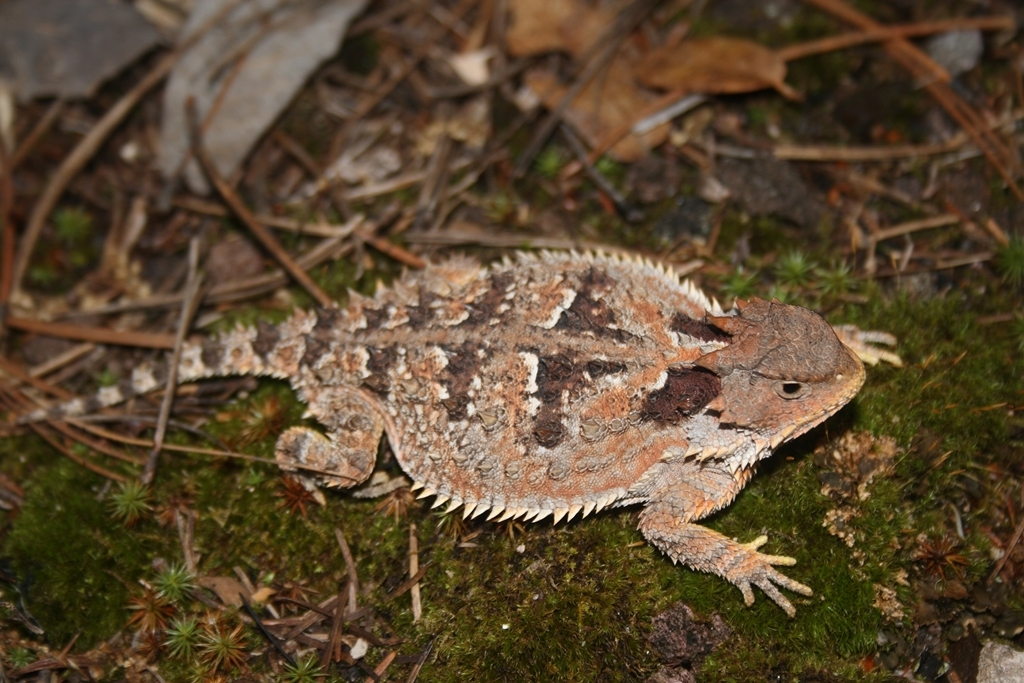
- In Chihuahua, Mexico

Conservation status
- Least Concern (IUCN 3.1)

Scientific classification
- Kingdom: Animalia
- Phylum: Chordata
- Class: Reptilia
- Order: Squamata
- Suborder: Iguania
- Family: Phrynosomatidae
- Genus: Phrynosoma
- Species: P. orbiculare

Binomial name
- Phrynosoma orbiculare (Linnaeus, 1758)

Synonyms
- List: Lacerta orbicularis Linnaeus, 1758; Agama orbicularis — Daudin, 1805; Phrynosoma orbiculare — Wiegmann, 1828; Tapaya orbicularis longicaudatus Dugès, 1888; Phrynosoma orbiculare — H.M. Smith & Taylor, 1950

= Mexican Plateau horned lizard =

Species of lizard

The Mexican Plateau horned lizard (Phrynosoma orbiculare) is a species of horned lizard in the family Phrynosomatidae. The species, also known commonly as the Chihuahua Desert horned lizard, is endemic to Mexico. There are five recognized subspecies. The specific epithet, orbiculare, comes from the Latin adjective orbis, meaning "circular".

== Etymology ==
The subspecific name, cortezii, is in honor of Spanish conquistador Hernán Cortés.

The subspecific name, dugesii, is in honor of French-born Mexican naturalist Alfredo Dugès, who is considered the "father" of Mexican herpetology.

== Distribution ==
P. orbiculare is found only in the high plateau country of central Mexico. Specifically, it is found in the Mexican states of Chihuahua, Durango, Morelos, Nuevo León, Puebla, and Veracruz.

== Subspecies ==
Five subspecies of P. orbiculare are recognized as being valid, including the nominotypical subspecies.

- Phrynosoma orbiculare bradti Horowitz, 1955
- Phrynosoma orbiculare cortezii (A.H.A. Duméril & Bocourt, 1870)
- Phrynosoma orbiculare dugesii (A.H.A. Duméril & Bocourt, 1870)
- Phrynosoma orbiculare orbiculare (Linnaeus, 1758)
- Phrynosoma orbiculare orientale Horowitz, 1955

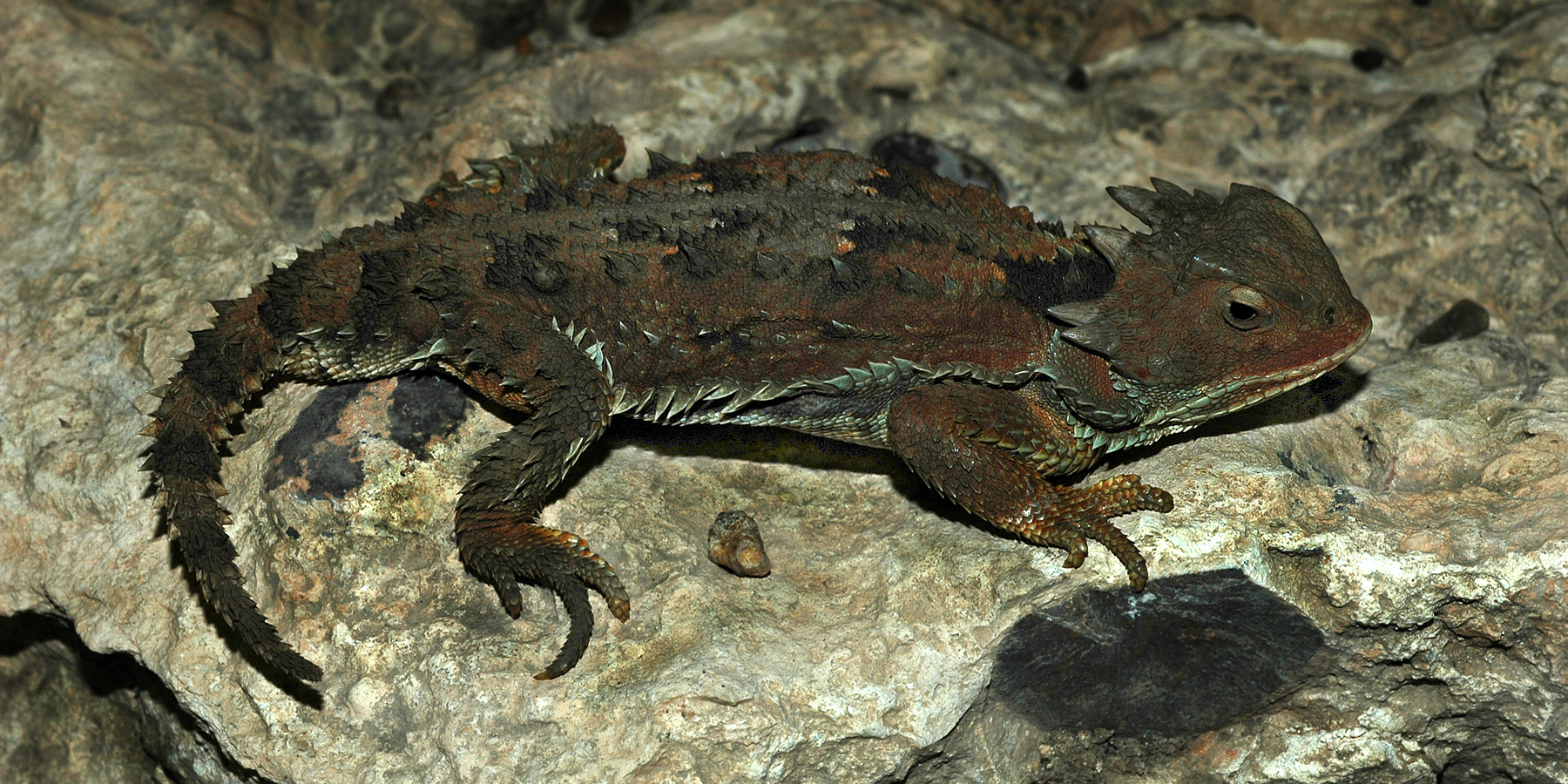
P. o. orientale, at Tamaulipas

Nota bene: A trinomial authority in parentheses indicates that the subspecies was originally described in a genus other than Phrynosoma.

== Description ==
P. orbiculare has a characteristic single row of lateral abdominal fringe scales. This "horned toad" also has two short occipital horns.

== Habitat ==
P. orbiculare occurs in a wide range of primary habitats (dry scrubland, pine-oak forest, oak forest, juniper forest) and secondary habitats (agricultural land, and agave and Opuntia fields).

== Reproduction ==
P. orbicularis is viviparous.

== Gallery ==
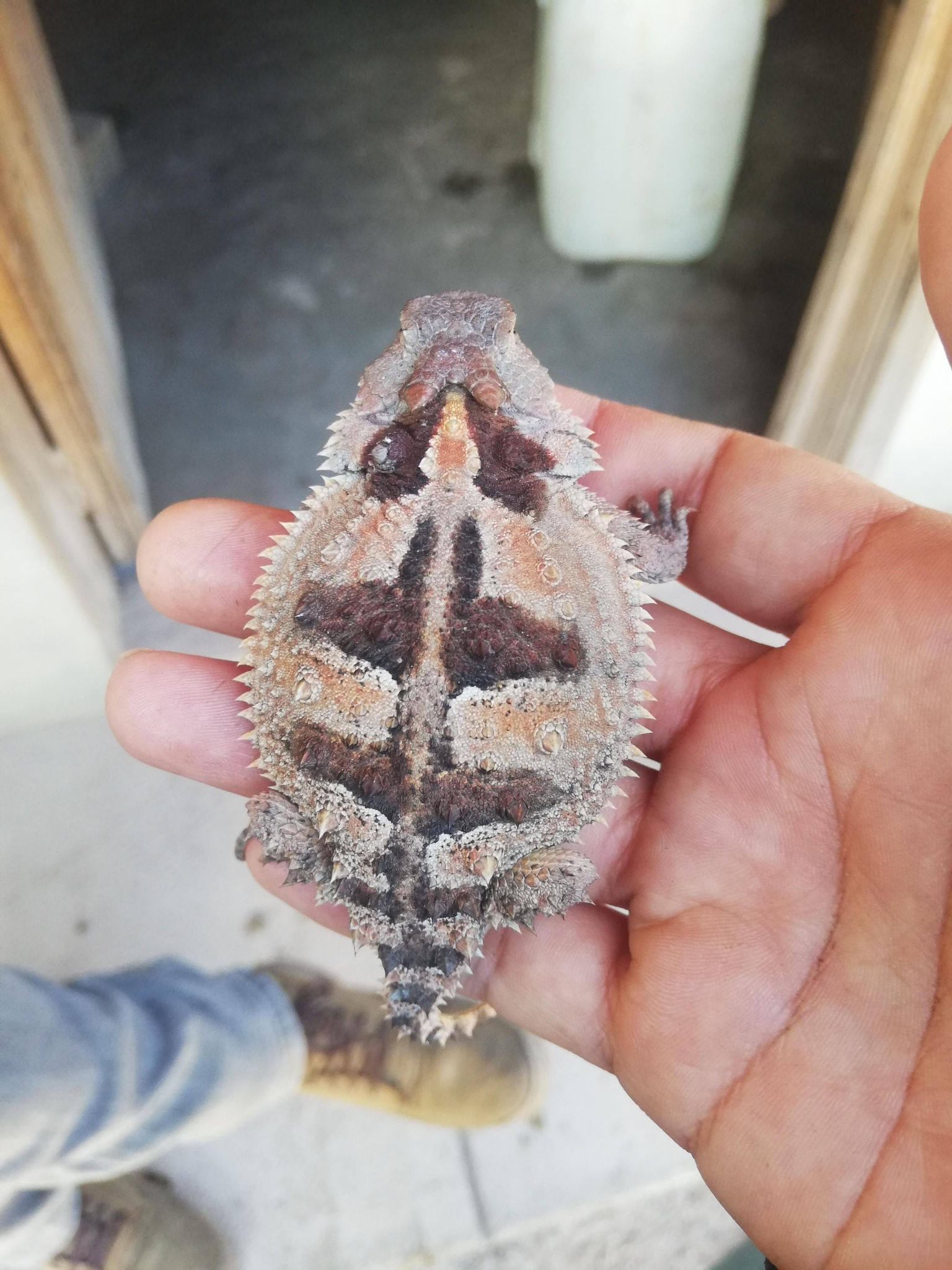
Showing size, at Sinaloa

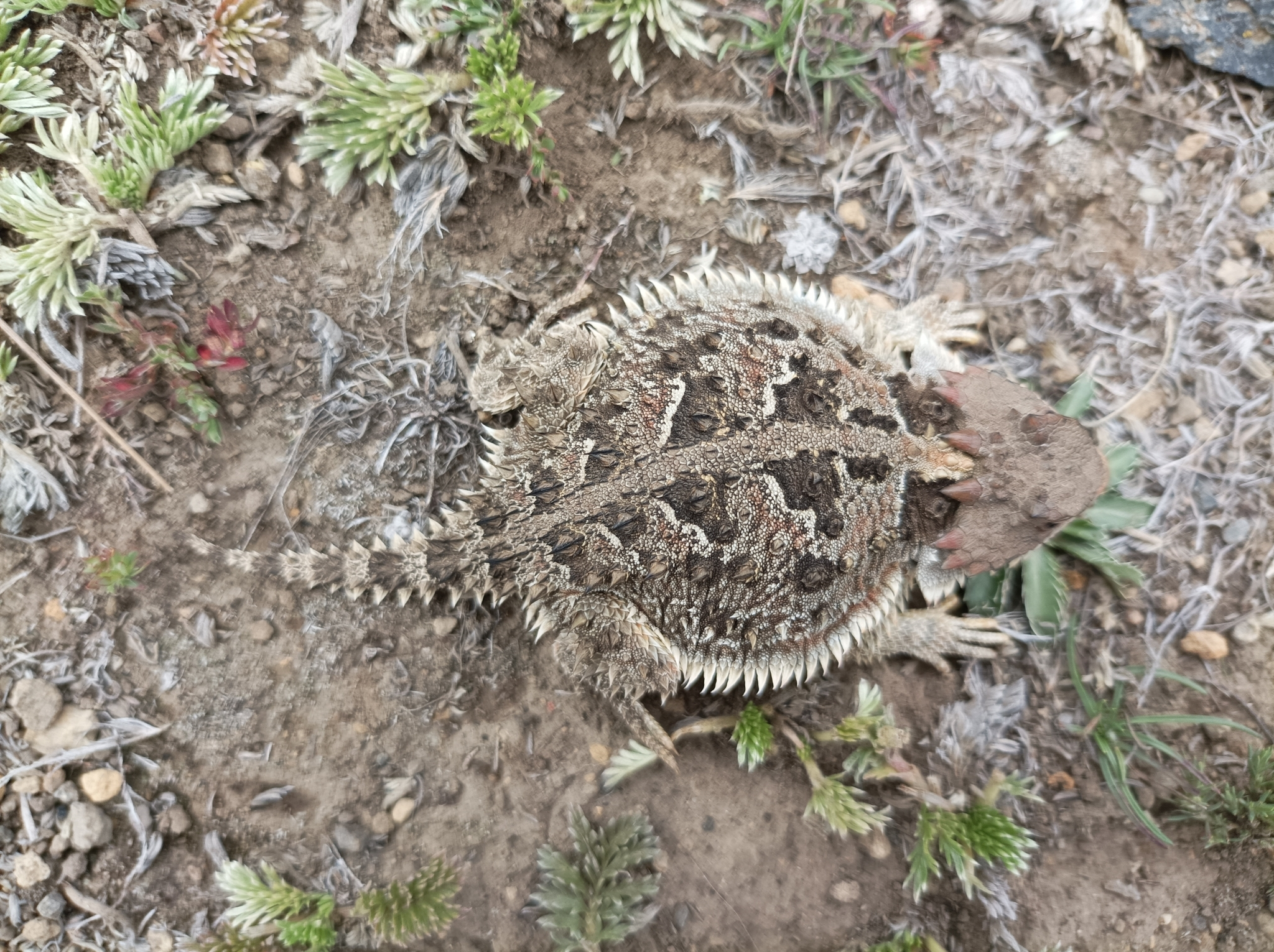
Dorsal view, at Puebla

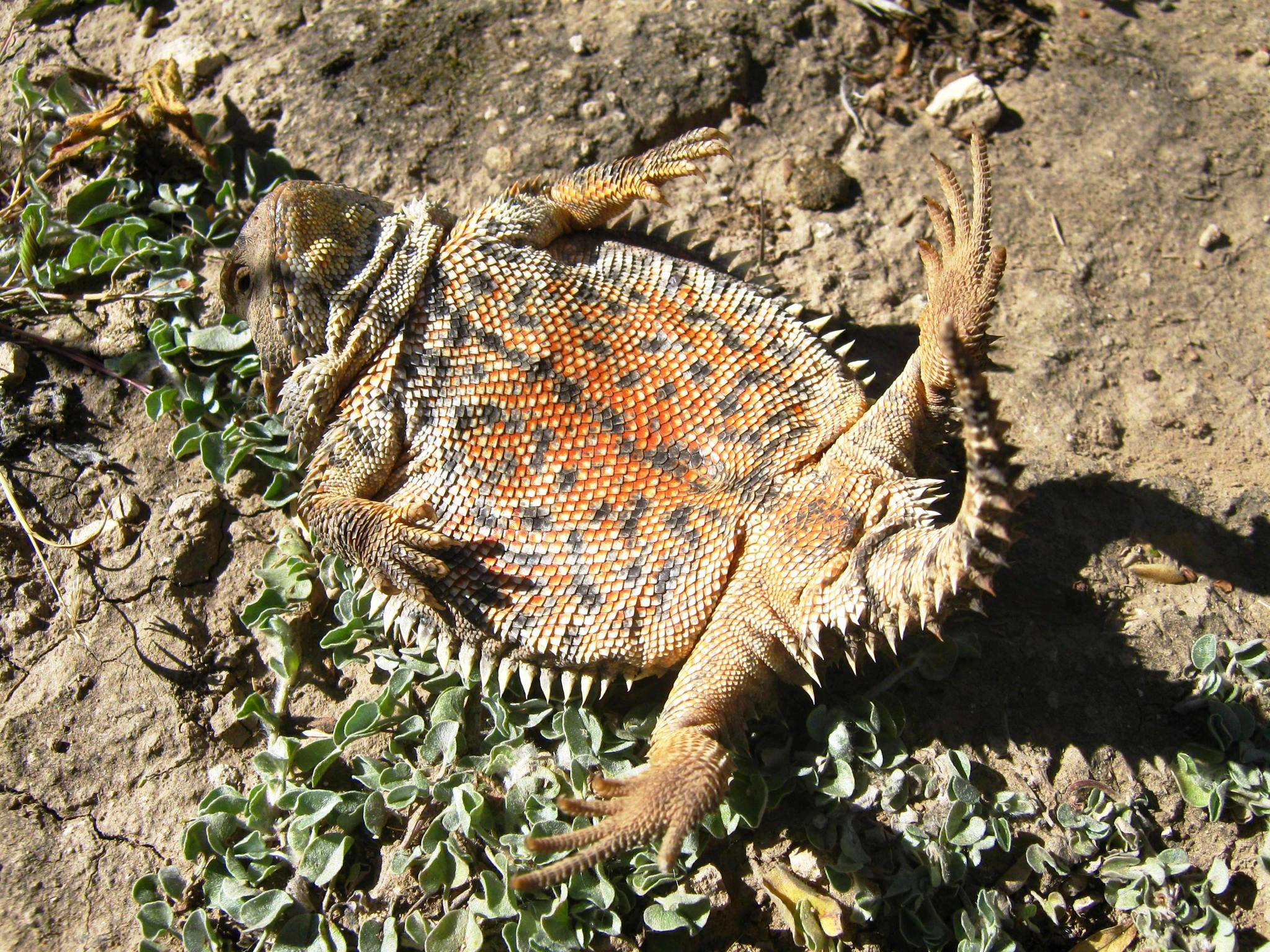
Showing underside, at Hidalgo

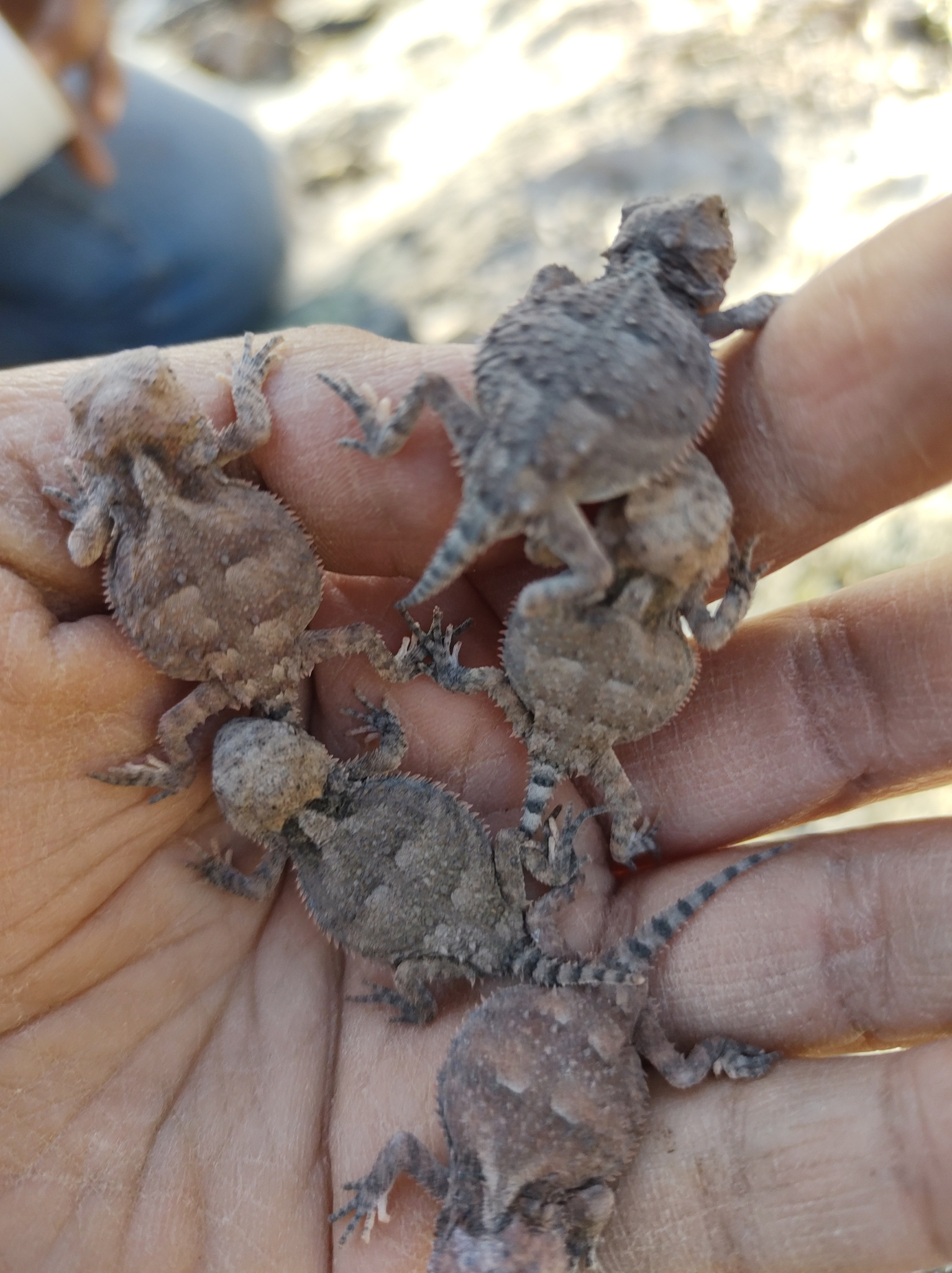
Young juveniles, at Sinaloa

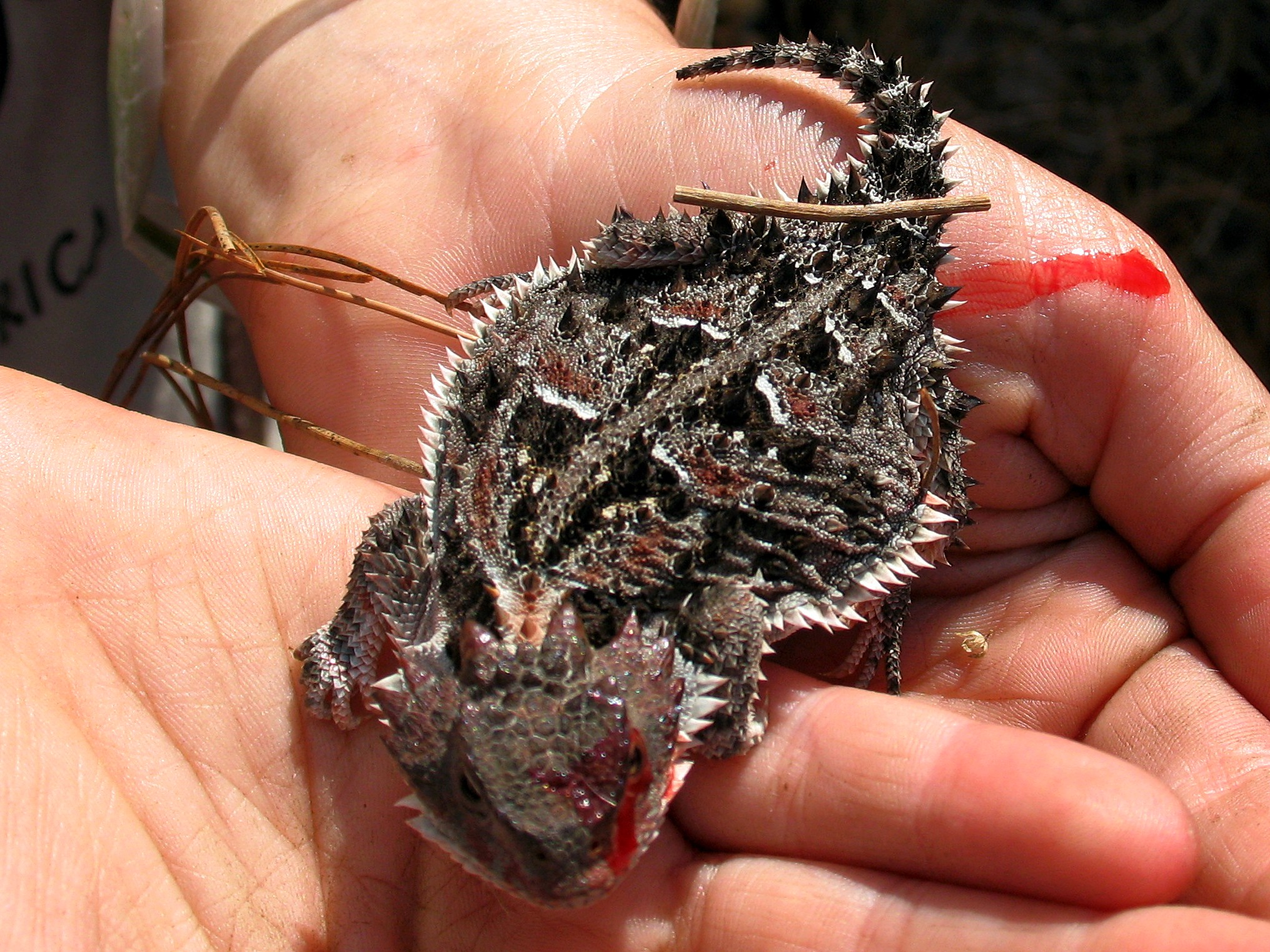
Showing blood from autohaemorrhaging, at Veracruz
