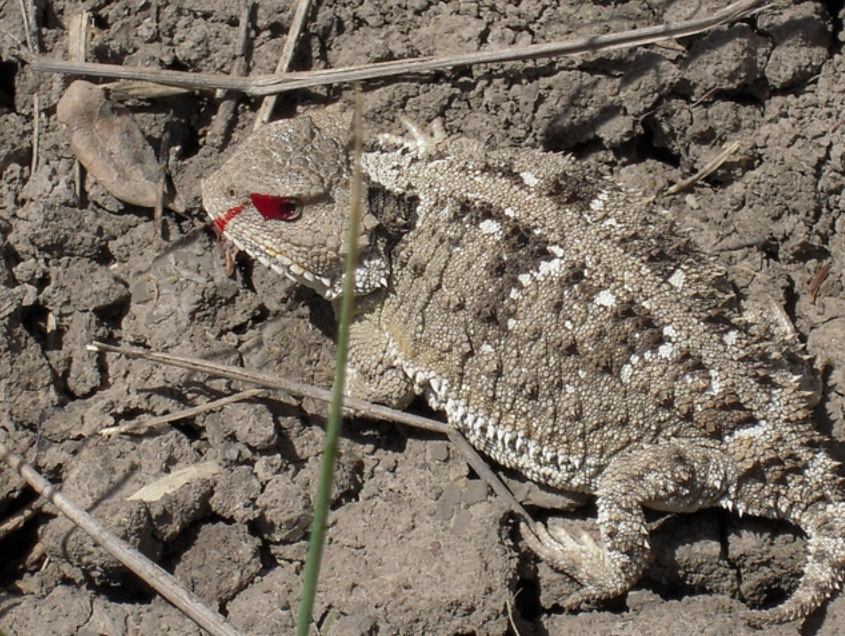

Scientific classification
- Domain: Eukaryota
- Kingdom: Animalia
- Phylum: Chordata
- Class: Reptilia
- Order: Squamata
- Suborder: Iguania
- Family: Phrynosomatidae
- Genus: Phrynosoma
- Species: P. brevirostris

Binomial name
- Phrynosoma brevirostris Girard, 1858

= Great Plains short-horned lizard =

Species of lizard

The Great Plains short-horned lizard (Phrynosoma brevirostris) is a horned lizard species native to Canada and the United States.
