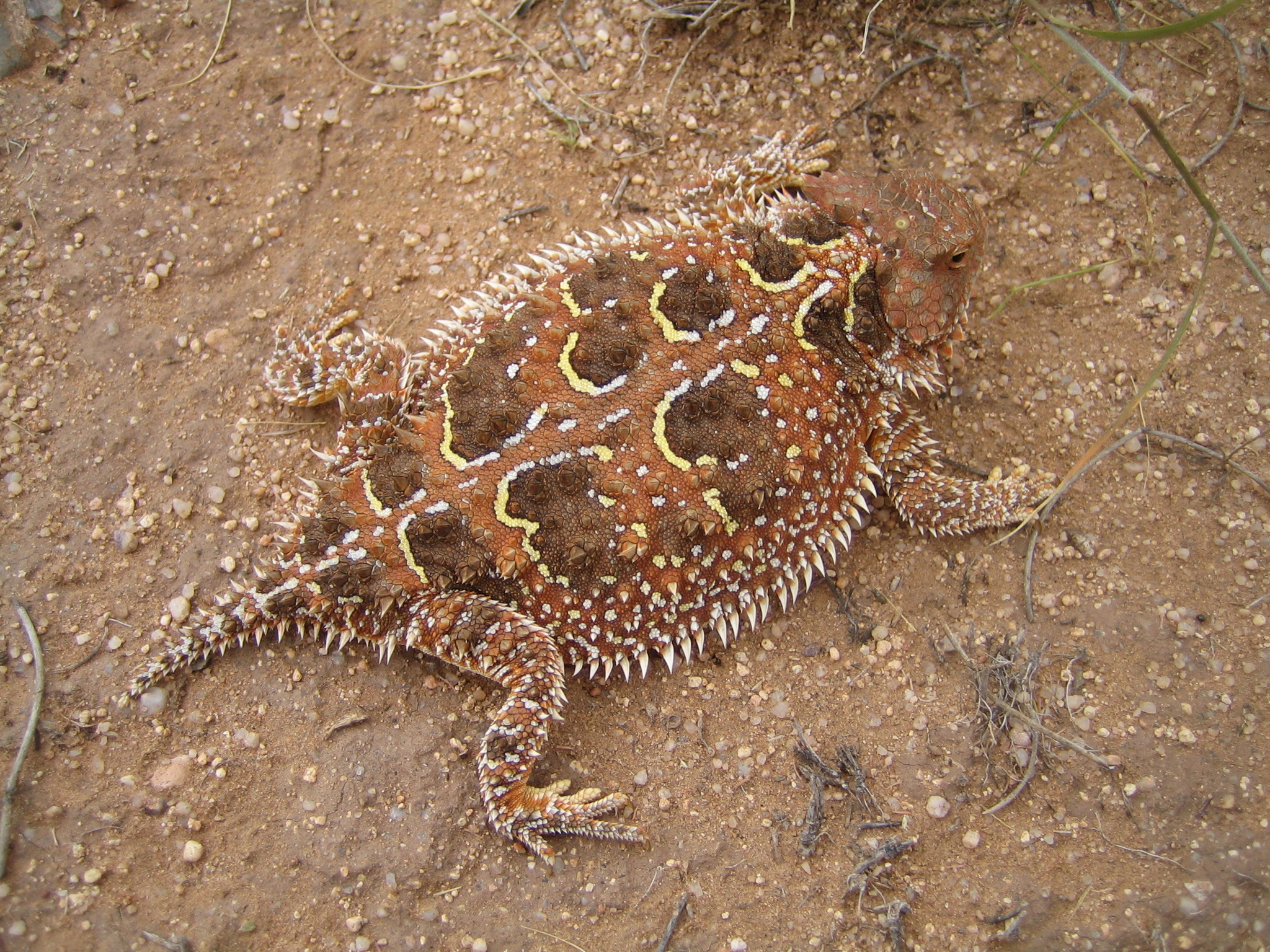
- In New Mexico

Scientific classification
- Kingdom: Animalia
- Phylum: Chordata
- Class: Reptilia
- Order: Squamata
- Suborder: Iguania
- Family: Phrynosomatidae
- Genus: Phrynosoma
- Species: P. ornatissimum

Binomial name
- Phrynosoma ornatissimum Girard, 1858

= Desert short-horned lizard =

Species of lizard

The desert short-horned lizard (Phrynosoma ornatissimum) is a horned lizard species native to Canada and the United States.
