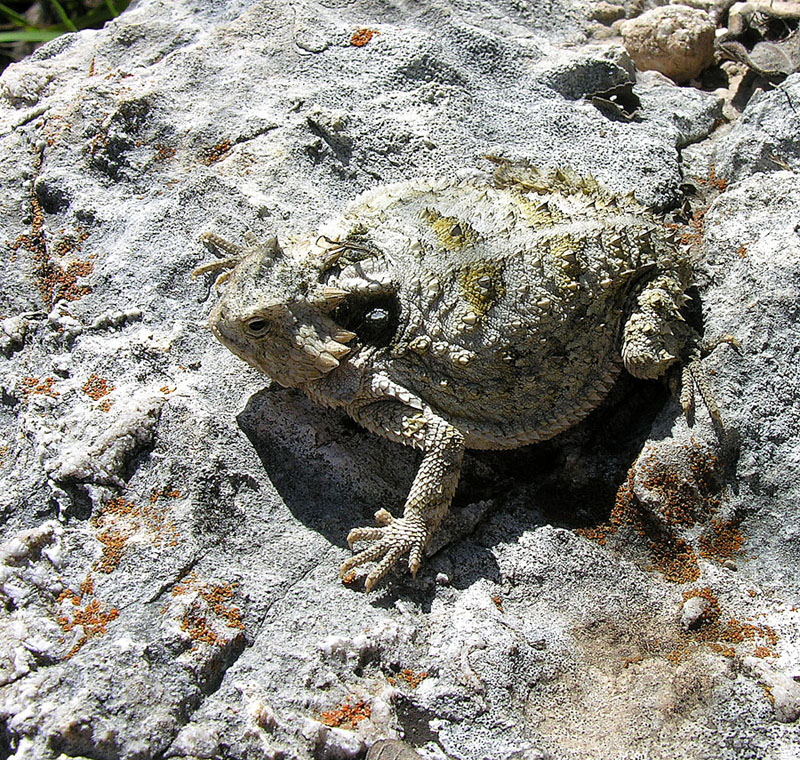

Conservation status
- Least Concern (IUCN 3.1)

Scientific classification
- Kingdom: Animalia
- Phylum: Chordata
- Class: Reptilia
- Order: Squamata
- Suborder: Iguania
- Family: Phrynosomatidae
- Genus: Phrynosoma
- Species: P. braconnieri

Binomial name
- Phrynosoma braconnieri A.H.A. Duméril & Bocourt, 1870

= Short-tailed horned lizard =

Species of lizard

The short-tailed horned lizard (Phrynosoma braconnieri) is a species of lizard in the family Phrynosomatidae. The species is endemic to Mexico. It has a very distinct, shortened tail, which is sometimes not apparent.

== Etymology ==
The specific epithet, braconnieri, is in honor of French naturalist Séraphin Braconnier (1812–1884).

== Description ==
P. braconnieri has a very short tail relative to its body length, the shortest of the horned lizards, or indeed of any lizard, thus its common name.

== Habitat ==
P. braconnieri inhabits pine-oak woodland and xeric thorn-scrub. It can also be found in corn fields or other traditional agricultural areas.

== Geographic range ==
The short-tailed horned lizard is found in the Mexican states of Puebla and Oaxaca. It may also inhabit Veracruz.

== Reproduction ==
P. braconnieri is viviparous. Its mating season begins in the early fall, with their children being born in the following, early spring.
