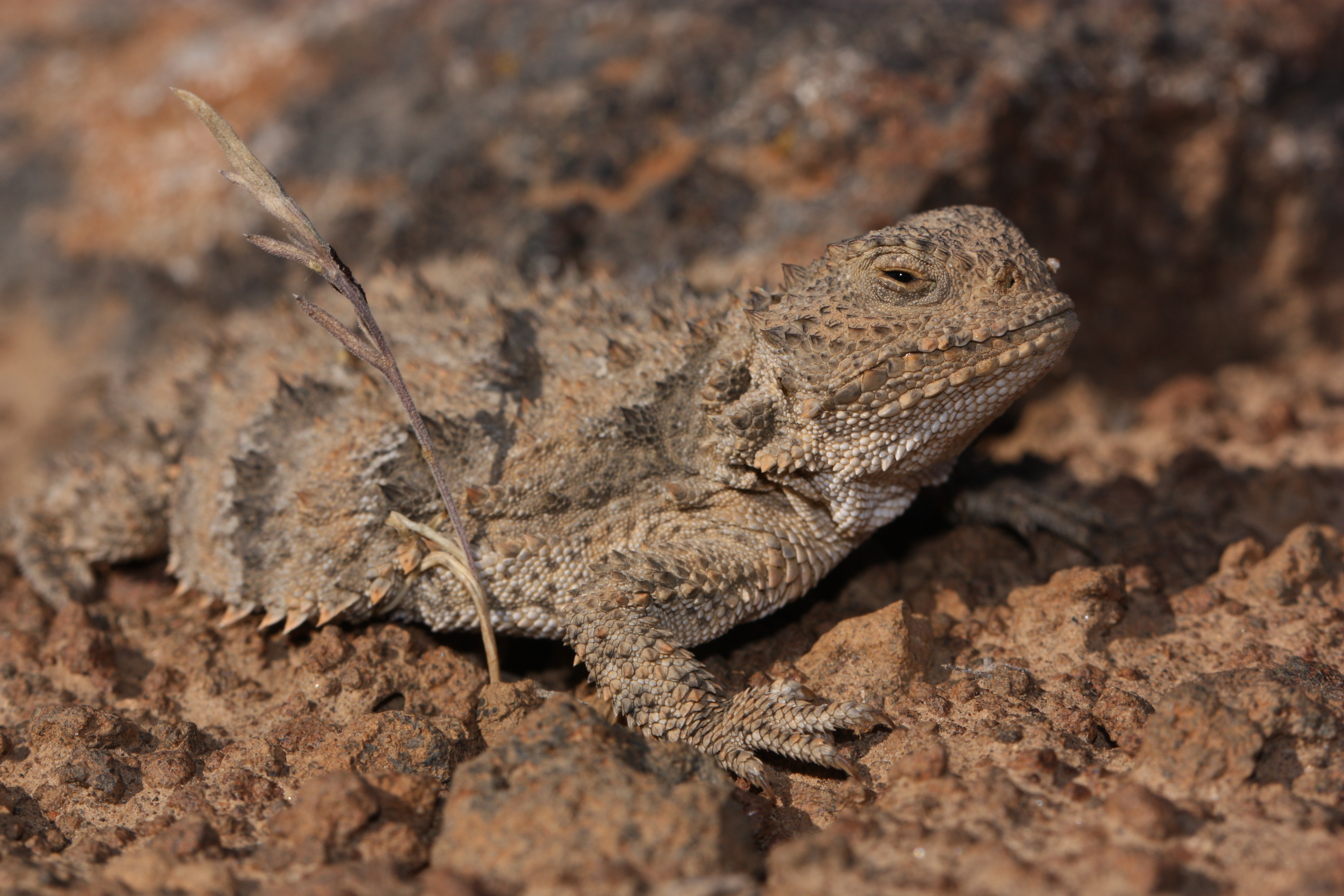

Conservation status
- Least Concern (IUCN 3.1)

Scientific classification
- Kingdom: Animalia
- Phylum: Chordata
- Class: Reptilia
- Order: Squamata
- Suborder: Iguania
- Family: Phrynosomatidae
- Genus: Phrynosoma
- Species: P. douglasii

Binomial name
- Phrynosoma douglasii (Bell, 1828)

= Pygmy short-horned lizard =

Species of lizard

The pygmy short-horned lizard (Phrynosoma douglasii) is a species of small horned lizard in the family Phrynosomatidae. The species is native to the northwestern United States and adjacent southwestern Canada. Like other horned lizards, it is often called a "horned toad" or "horny toad", but it is not a toad at all. It is a reptile, not an amphibian.

== Etymology ==
The specific name, douglasii, is in honor of Scottish botanist David Douglas.

== Identification ==
The pygmy short-horned lizard is often mistaken for its close relative, the greater short-horned lizard (P. hernandesi), as both species have much of the same physiology, such as a squat body and small, "horn"-like, pointed scales located along the head, back and side body. Until recent mitochondrial DNA evidence was revealed, the greater short-horned lizard was considered to be the same species as the pygmy short-horned lizard, but the two are now considered distinct, with the pygmy species occupying the northwest portion of the U.S. and, formerly, the extreme south of British Columbia (now extirpated from Canada). When placed together, the two are easily distinguished at maturity, as the pygmy short-horned lizard is considerably smaller. The greater short-horned lizard is a highly variable species, as well, with different geographic populations exhibiting differences in colouration and patterning, in addition to overall size; some authorities describe up to five subspecies.

The pygmy short-horned lizard measures roughly 1.25–2.5 in (3.2–6.4 cm) from snout-to-vent (SVL) and is a flat-bodied, squat lizard with short (but not sharp) spikes crowning the head. It has a "snub-nosed" side profile compared to the sleeker snouts of many lizards, and relatively short legs. The trunk is fringed by one row of pointed scales, while the belly scales are smooth. Their colour is greyish-beige, yellowish, or reddish-brown, depending on seasonality and region. Additionally, there are two rows of larger, dark spots on the back. When ready to mate, or threatened or reacting defensively, this species' colours become more intense (commonly known as "fired-up").

== Behavior ==
The diet of P. douglasii varies from region to region, by seasonal availability, and by an individual's age or sex; neonates and hatchlings feed almost exclusively on ants (89% of their diet), while it has been documented that mature lizards consume fewer ants (around 72% of their diet). Yearlings consume the lowest proportion of ants (60%), supplementing their diets with various arachnids, beetles and grubs, isopods, terrestrial mollusks (snails, slugs) and earthworms, as well as Lepidopterans and their caterpillars. They may also browse on plant matter. Overall, throughout their lives, pygmy short-horned lizards always consume ants, though total quantities of a particular prey species will vary seasonally.

Predators of P. douglasii include long-nosed leopard lizards, Steller’s jays, northern shrikes, coyotes, foxes, birds of prey, bobcats, and potentially larger, squamate-consuming snakes, such as kingsnakes (e.g. California kingsnakes and California mountain kingsnakes).

Within its family, given that its habitat often freezes during winter, the pygmy short-horned lizard is known as a unique species that tolerates lower temperatures better than others, thus it can inhabit biomes not generally accessible to related species.
