= Low Desert =

Term for low-lying deserts in California, US

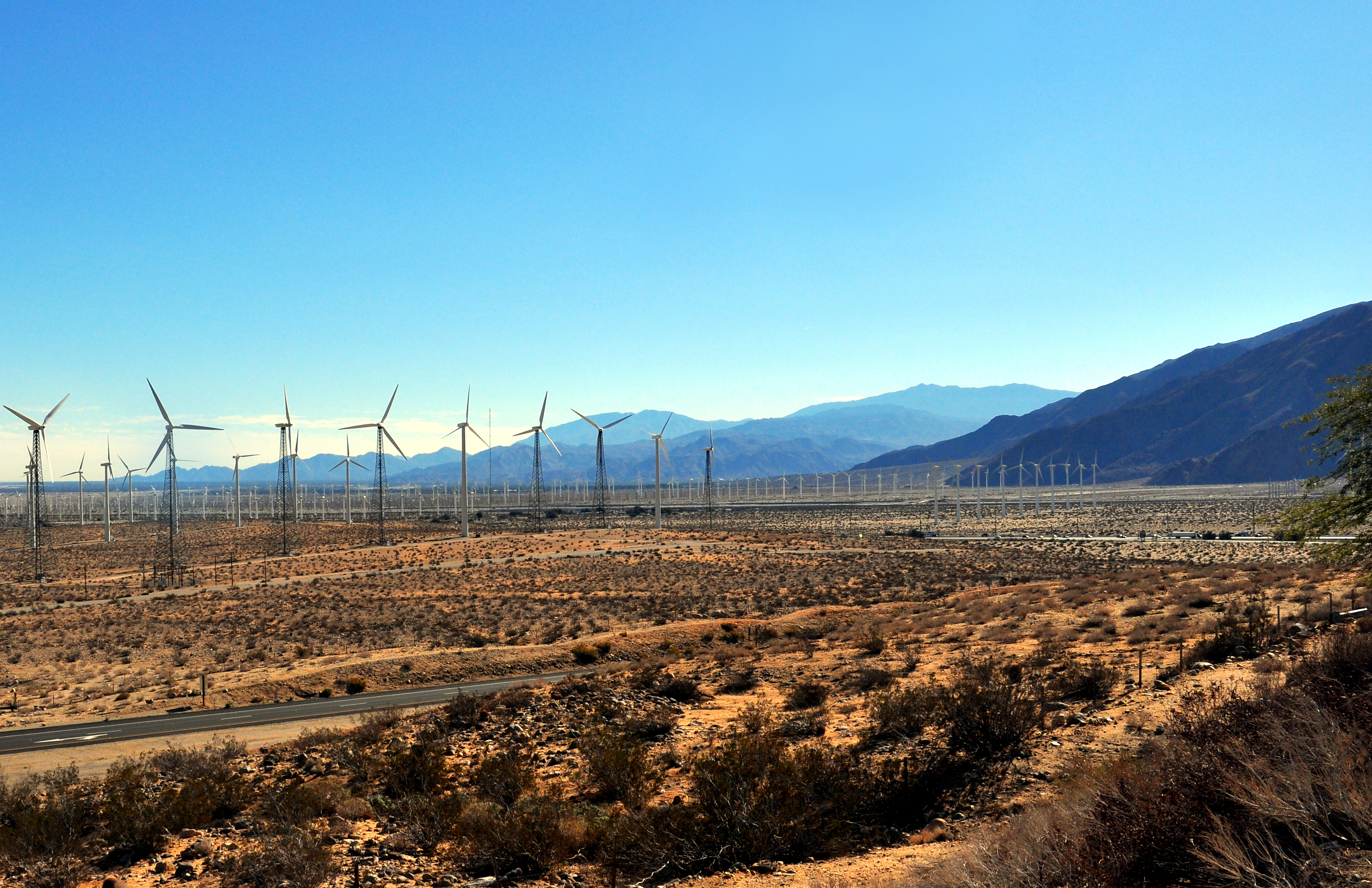
Gateway to Palm Springs, California as seen from above California State Route 62 in the Sonoran Desert, California

The Low Desert (colloquially referred to as the Desert within the region) is a common name for any desert in California that is under 2,000 feet (609.6 m) in altitude. These areas include, but are not exclusive to, the Colorado Desert and Yuha Desert branches of the Sonoran Desert, in the far southeasternmost portion of Southern California. The Low Desert is distinguished in biogeography from the adjacent northern High Desert or Mojave Desert by latitude, elevation, animal life, climate, and native plant communities.

== Communities ==
The cities and towns in the Low Desert include:

- Coachella Valley area
  - Bermuda Dunes
  - Cathedral City
  - Coachella
  - Desert Hot Springs
  - Indian Wells
  - Indio
  - La Quinta
  - Mecca
  - Palm Desert
  - Palm Springs
  - Rancho Mirage
  - Thermal
  - Thousand Palms
- Imperial Valley area
  - Brawley
  - Calexico
  - Calipatria
  - El Centro
  - Holtville
  - Imperial
  - Niland
  - Westmorland
- Lower Colorado River Valley area
  - Blythe
  - Palo Verde
  - Winterhaven
- Salton Sea area
  - Bombay Beach
  - North Shore
  - Salton City
- Borrego Springs
- Ocotillo Wells

== Parks and Protected Areas ==
- Anza-Borrego Desert State Park
- Coachella Valley Preserve
- Joshua Tree National Park – Southern portion of the Park is included in the Low Desert, the northern portion is within the Mojave Desert
- Salton Sea State Recreation Area
- Indio Hills Palms Park
- Santa Rosa and San Jacinto Mountains National Monument
- Big Morongo Canyon Preserve

=== Wildlife refuges and wilderness areas ===
- Coachella Valley National Wildlife Refuge
- Imperial National Wildlife Refuge
- Havasu National Wildlife Refuge
- Cibola National Wildlife Refuge
- Sonny Bono Salton Sea National Wildlife Refuge
- Fish Creek Mountains Wilderness
- Santa Rosa Wilderness
- Indian Pass Wilderness
- Whipple Mountains Wilderness
- Sawtooth Mountains Wilderness
- Little Picacho Wilderness

== See also ==
- Category:Populated places in the Colorado Desert
- Category:Protected areas of the Colorado Desert
- Category:Wilderness areas within the Lower Colorado River Valley
- Category:Flora of the California desert regions
- Category:Mountain ranges of the Colorado Desert
