= Bibliography of encyclopedias: biology =

This is a list of encyclopedias as well as encyclopedic and biographical dictionaries published on the subject of biology in any language.

Entries are in the English language unless specifically stated as otherwise.

== General biology ==
- Becher, Anne, Joseph Richey. American environmental leaders: From colonial times to the present. Grey House, 2008. ISBN 9781592371198.
- Butcher, Russell D., Stephen E. Adair, Lynn A. Greenwalt. America's national wildlife refuges: A complete guide. Roberts Rinehart Publishers in cooperation with Ducks Unlimited, 2003. ISBN 1570983798.
- Cullen, Katherine E. (2009). Encyclopedia of Life Science. Infobase Publishing. ISBN 978-0-8160-7008-4.
- Ecological Internet, Inc. EcoEarth.info: Environment portal and search engine. Ecological Internet, Inc. .
- Encyclopedia of Life Sciences. John Wiley & Sons. 25 May 2007. ISBN 978-0-470-06651-5.
- Encyclopedia of Life Sciences. Groves Dictionaries Incorporated. 1 November 2001. ISBN 978-1-56159-238-8.
- Friday, Adrian & Davis S. Ingram. The Cambridge Encyclopedia of Life Sciences. Cambridge, 1985.
- Gaither, Carl C., Alma E. Cavazos-Gaither, Andrew Slocombe. Naturally speaking: A dictionary of quotations on biology, botany, nature and zoology. Institute of Physics, 2001. ISBN 0750306815.
- Gibson, Daniel, National Audubon Society. Audubon guide to the national wildlife refuges. Southwest: Arizona, Nevada, New Mexico, Texas. St. Martin's Griffin, 2000. ISBN 0312207778.
- Goudie, Andrew, David J. Cuff. Encyclopedia of global change: Environmental change and human society. Oxford University Press, 2002. ISBN 0195108256.
- Gove, Doris. Audubon guide to the national wildlife refuges. Southeast : Alabama, Florida, Georgia, Kentucky, Mississippi, North Carolina, Puerto Rico, South Carolina, Tennessee, U.S. Virgin Islands. St. Martin's Griffin, 2000. ISBN 0312241283.
- Grassy, John. Audubon guide to the national wildlife refuges: Northern Midwest: Illinois, Indiana, Iowa, Michigan, Minnesota, Nebraska, North Dakota, Ohio, South Dakota, Wisconsin. St. Martin's Griffin, c2000. ISBN 0312243154.
- Grassy, John. Audubon guide to the national wildlife refuges: Rocky Mountains: Colorado, Idaho, Montana, Utah, Wyoming. St. Martin's Griffin, 2000. ISBN 0312245742.
- Gray, Peter. Encyclopedia of the Biological Sciences. Krieger, 1981.
- Grinstein, Louise S., Carol A. Biermann, Rose K. Rose. Women in the biological sciences: A biobibliographic sourcebook. Greenwood Press, 1997. ISBN 0313291802.
- Hancock, John M., Marketa J. Zvelebil. Dictionary of bioinformatics and computational biology. Wiley-Liss, 2004. ISBN 0471436224.
- Hosansky, David. The environment A to Z. CQ Press, 2001. ISBN 1568025831.
- Laubach, René. Audubon guide to the national wildlife refuges. New England : Connecticut, Maine, Massachusetts, New Hampshire, Rhode Island, Vermont. St. Martin's Griffin, 2000. ISBN 0312204507.
- Mac Arthur, Loren, Debbie S. Miller. Audubon guide to the national wildlife refuges. Alaska and the Northwest: Alaska, Oregon, Washington. St. Martin's Griffin, 2000. ISBN 0312253729.
- Mac Arthur, Loren. Audubon guide to the national wildlife refuges. California & Hawaii : California, Hawaii. St. Martin's Griffin, 2000. ISBN 0312206895.
- Marinelli, Janet, Stephen K.-M. Tim, Brooklyn Botanic Garden. The Brooklyn Botanic Garden gardener's desk reference. Henry Holt, 1998. ISBN 0805050957.
- McAinish, T. F. Physics in Medicine & Biology Encyclopedia. Pergamon Press, 1986.
- Mongillo, John F.; Zierdt-Warshaw, Linda (2000). Encyclopedia of Environmental Science. University Rochester Press. ISBN 978-1-57356-147-1.
- Munn, R. E. Encyclopedia of global environmental change. Wiley, 2002. ISBN 0471977969.
- National Academy of Sciences. Biographical memoirs of the national academy of sciences. National Academy of Sciences. .
- Nature Publishing Group. Encyclopedia of life sciences. Nature Publishing Group, 2002. ISBN 1561592749.
- Niergenberg, William Aaron, Edward O. Wilson, Peter H. Raven. Encyclopedia of environmental biology. Academic Press, 1995. ISBN 0122267303.
- Nybakken, James Willard, William W. Broenkow, T. L. Vallier. Interdisciplinary encyclopedia of marine sciences. Grolier Academic Reference, 2003. ISBN 0717259463.
- O'Daly, Anne. Encyclopedia of life sciences. Marshall Cavendish, 2004. ISBN 0761474420.
- Palmer, William, National Audubon Society. Audubon guide to the national wildlife refuges. South Central: Arkansas, Kansas, Louisiana, Missouri, Oklahoma. St. Martin's Griffin, 2000. ISBN 0312244878.
- Pilch, Richard F., Raymond A. Zilinskas. Encyclopedia of bioterrorism defense. Wiley-LISS, 2005. ISBN 0471467170.
- Polunin, Nicholas, Lynn M. Curme. World who is who and does what in environment and conservation. St. Martin's Press; Foundation for Environmental Conservation, 1997. ISBN 0312174489.
- Porter, Roy, Marilyn Bailey Ogilvie. The biographical dictionary of scientists. Oxford University Press, 2000. ISBN 0195216636.
- Ricciuti, Edward R. Audubon guide to the national wildlife refuges. Mid-Atlantic: Delaware, Maryland, New Jersey, New York, Pennsylvania, Virginia, West Virginia. St. Martin's Griffin, 2000. ISBN 0312204817.
- Roberts, Keith (2007). Handbook of plant science. John Wiley. ISBN 978-0-470-05723-0.
- Royal Society (Great Britain). Biographical memoirs of fellows of the royal society. Royal Society, 1955–. ISSN 0080-4606.
- Shearer, Benjamin F., Barbara Smith Shearer. Notable women in the life sciences: a biographical dictionary. Greenwood Press, 1996. ISBN 0313293023.
- Sterling, Keir B. Biographical dictionary of American and Canadian naturalists and environmentalists. Greenwood Press, 1997. ISBN 0313230471.
- U. S. Department of Energy, Office of Scientific and Technical Information. Science.gov. U. S. Dept. of Energy, Office of Scientific and Technical Information, 2002-. .
- Wexler, Philip, Bruce D. Anderson, Ann de Peyster. Encyclopedia of toxicology. Elsevier Academic, 2005. ISBN 0127453512.

=== Lifeforms ===
- Association for Biodiversity Information. NatureServe explorer: An online encyclopedia of life. NatureServe. .
- Beacham, Walton, Frank V. Castronova, Suzanne Sessine. Beacham's guide to the endangered species of North America. Gale Group, 2001. ISBN 0787650285.
- Center for Applied Biodiversity Science. Biodiversity hotspots. Conservation International. .
- Field Museum of Natural History. The encyclopedia of life: EOL. Encyclopedia of Life, 2007-. .
- Henry, Helen L., Anthony W. Norman. Encyclopedia of hormones. Academic Press, 2003. ISBN 0123411033.
- IUCN Invasive Species Specialist Group. Global invasive species database. IUCN Invasive Species Specialist Group. 2000-. .
- Levin, Simon A. Encyclopedia of biodiversity. Academic Press, 2001. ISBN 0122268652.
- Pagel, Mark D. Encyclopedia of evolution. Oxford University Press, 2002. ISBN 0195122003. .
- Polistes Foundation. Discover life. Polistes Corporation, 1999-. .
- Tree of Life Web Project. Tree of life. University of Arizona. .
- World Wildlife Fund. World wildlife fund. World Wildlife Fund. .

==== Animals ====
- Audubon Society Encyclopedia of Animal Life. Clarkson N. Potter, 1982.
- Bekoff, Marc, Jane Goodall. Encyclopedia of animal behavior. Greenwood Press, 2004. ISBN 0313327459.
- Bruce, Jenni. The encyclopedia of animals: A complete visual guide. University of California Press, 2004. ISBN 0520244060.
- Burton, Maurice, Robert Burton. International wildlife encyclopedia. Marshall Cavendish, 2002. ISBN 0761472665.
- Encyclopedia of Animal Behavior. Facts on File, 1987.
- Encyclopedia of Animal Biology. Facts on File, 1987.
- Encyclopedia of Animal Ecology. Facts on File, 1987.
- Encyclopedia of Animal Evolution. Facts on File, 1987.
- Grzimek, Bernhard. Grzimek's Animal Life Encyclopedia. Van Nostrand, 1972–1975.
- Grzimek's Encyclopedia of Ethology. Van Nostrand, 1972–1977.
- The Illustrated Encyclopedia of Wildlife. Grey Castle Press, 1991.
- Knobil, Ernst and Jimmy D. Neill. Encyclopedia of reproduction. Academic Press, 1998. ISBN 0122270207.
- Macmillan Illustrated Animal Encyclopedia. Macmillan, 1984.
- Marshall Cavendish International Wildlife Encyclopedia. Marshall Cavendish, 1990.
- Nowak, Ronald M., David W. Macdonald, Roland W. Kays. Walker's carnivores of the world. Johns Hopkins University Press, 2005. ISBN 0801880335.
- The Oxford Companion to Animal Behaviour. Oxford, 1987.
- World Nature Encyclopedia. Raintree/Steck-Vaughn, 1989.

===== Aquatic =====
- Banister, Keith & Andrew Campbell. The Encyclopedia of Aquatic Life. Facts on File, 1985.
- Dakin, Nick. Macmillan Book of the Marine Aquarium. Macmillan, 1993.
- The Encyclopedia of Marine Invertebrates. T. F. H. Publications, 1983.
- Folkens, Pieter A., Randall R. Reeves, National Audubon Society. Guide to marine mammals of the world. A. A. Knopf, 2002. ISBN 0375411410.
- George, David and Jennifer. Marine Life: An Illustrated Encyclopedia of Invertebrates in the Sea. Wiley, 1979.
- Halstead, Bruce. Dangerous Aquatic Animals of the World: A Color Atlas. Darwin Press, 1992.
- Sterba, Gunther. The Aquarium Encyclopedia. MIT Press, 1983.
- Stickney, Robert R. Encyclopedia of aquaculture. Wiley, 2000. ISBN 0471291013.

====== Fishes ======
- Dr. Axelrod's Atlas of Freshwater Aquarium Fishes. T. F. H. Publications, 6th ed., 1991.
- Dr. Burgess's Mini-Atlas of Freshwater Aquarium Fishes. T. F. H. Publications, 1991.
- Eschmeyer, William N., Earl Stannard Herald, Howard Hammann. A field guide to Pacific Coast fishes of North America: From the Gulf of Alaska to Baja, California. Houghton Mifflin, 1983. ISBN 0395331889.
- Froese, R., D. Pauly International Center for Living Aquatic Resources Management. FishBase: A global information system on fishes. FishBase, [2000?]-. .
- Gilbert, Carter Rowell, James D. Williams, National Audubon Society. National Audubon Society field guide to fishes. Alfred A. Knopf, 2002. ISBN 0375412247.
- Goldstein, Robert J., Rodney W. Harper, Richard Edwards. American aquarium fishes. Texas A&M University Press, 2000. ISBN 0890968802.
- Page, Lawrence M., Brooks M. Burr, Eugene C. Beckham III, National Audubon Society. A field guide to freshwater fishes: North America north of Mexico. Houghton Mifflin, 1991. ISBN 0395910919.
- Paxton, John R., William N. Eschmeyer, David Kirshner. Encyclopedia of fishes. Academic Press, 1998. ISBN 0125476655.

===== Arthropods =====
====== Insects ======
- Audubon Society Book of Insects. Abrams, 1983.
- Capinera, John L. Encyclopedia of entomology. Kluwer Academic, 2004. ISBN 0792386701.
- Johnson, Warren T., Howard H. Lyon, C. S. Koehler. Insects that feed on trees and shrubs. Comstock Publishing Associates, 1991. ISBN 0801426022.
- Marshall, S. A. Insects: Their natural history and diversity; With a photographic guide to insects of eastern North America. Firefly Books, 2006. ISBN 1552979008.
- Milne, Lorus Johnson, Margery Joan Greene Milne, Susan Rayfield. The Audubon Society field guide to North American insects and spiders. Knopf, 1980. ISBN 0394507630.
- O'Toole, Christopher. The Encyclopedia of Insects. Facts on File, 1986.
- Pyle, Robert Michael, Carol Nehring, Jane Opper, National Audubon Society. The Audubon Society field guide to North American butterflies. Knopf, 1981. ISBN 0394519140.
- Resh, Vincent H., Ring T. Cardé. Encyclopedia of insects. Academic Press, 2003. ISBN 0125869908.
- Solomon, J. D., U.S. Dept. of Agriculture, Forest Service. Guide to insect borers in North American broadleaf trees and shrubs. U.S. Dept. of Agriculture, Forest Service, 1995.

===== Birds =====
- Alderfer, Jonathan K., National Geographic Society (U. S.). National Geographic complete birds of North America. National Geographic, 2006. ISBN 0792241754.
- American Ornithologists' Union, Academy of Natural Sciences of Philadelphia, Cornell University. The birds of North America. American Ornithologists' Union, 1992–2002. ISSN 1061-5466.
- Cambridge Encyclopedia of Ornithology. Cambridge, 1991.
- Campbell, Bruce and Elizabeth Lack. Dictionary of Birds. Buteo, rev. ed., 1985.
- Clark, William S., Brian K. Wheeler. A field guide to hawks of North America. Houghton Mifflin, 2001. ISBN 0395670675.
- Cornell University. All about birds. Cornell Laboratory of Ornithology. .
- del Hoyo, Josep, Andrew Elliott, Jordi Sargatal. Handbook of the birds of the world. Lynx Edicions, 1992–2006. ISBN 8487334105.
- Dunn, Jon, Jonathan K. Alderfer, National Geographic Society (U.S.). National Geographic field guide to the birds of North America. National Geographic, 2006. ISBN 0792253140.
- Ferguson-Lees, David A. Christie, Kim Franklin. Raptors of the world. Houghton Mifflin, 2001. ISBN 0618127623.
- Fuller, Errol. Extinct birds. Comstock, 2001. ISBN 080143954X.
- Montagu, George (1802). Ornithological Dictionary; or Alphabetical Synopsis of British Birds, London: J. White.
- Montagu, George (1813). Supplement to the Ornithological Dictionary, Or Synopsis of British Birds. S. Woolmer, Exeter. p. 1.
- Perrins, Christopher. Illustrated Encyclopedia of Birds. Prentice Hall, 1991.
- Perrins, Christopher and Alex Middleton. Encyclopedia of Birds. Facts on File, 1985.
- Robbins, Chandler S., Bertel Bruun, Herbert Spencer Zim. Birds of North America: A guide to field identification. St. Martin's Press, 2001. ISBN 1582380910.
- Sibley, David. The Sibley field guide to birds of eastern North America. Alfred A. Knopf, 2003. ISBN 067945120X.
- Sibley, David. The Sibley field guide to birds of western North America. Alfred A. Knopf, 2003. ISBN 0679451218.
- Sibley, David, Chris Elphick, John B. Dunning, National Audubon Society. The Sibley guide to bird life and behavior. Alfred A. Knopf, 2001. ISBN 0679451234.
- Sibley, David. The Sibley guide to birds. Alfred A. Knopf, 2000. ISBN 0679451226.
- Terres, John K. Audubon Society Encyclopedia of North American Birds. Knopf, 1991.

===== Endangered species =====
- Endangered Wildlife of the World. Marshall Cavendish, 1993.
- The Grolier World Encyclopedia of Endangered Species. Grolier, 1992.
- Lowe, David W., John R. Matthews, Charles J. Moseley, World Wildlife Fund. The official World Wildlife Fund guide to endangered species of North America. Beacham, 1990–1994. ISBN 0933833172.
- Official World Wildlife Fund Guide to Endangered Species. Beacham, 1990–1992.

===== Mammals =====
- Beacham, Walton, Kirk H. Beetz. Beacham's guide to international endangered species. Beacham, 1998–2001. ISBN 0933833342.
- Elbroch, Mark. Mammal tracks and sign: A guide to North American species. Stackpole Books, 2003. ISBN 0811726266.
- Folkens, Pieter A., Randall R. Reeves, National Audubon Society. Guide to marine mammals of the world. A. A. Knopf, 2002. ISBN 0375411410.
- Grzimek, Bernhard. Grzimek's Encyclopedia of Mammals. McGraw-Hill, 2nd ed., 1990. ISBN 0079095089.
- Macdonald, David. Encyclopedia of Mammals. Facts on File, 2006. ISBN 0816064946.
- Mammals: A Multimedia Encyclopedia. National Geographic Society/IBM, 1990.
- Nowak, Ronald. Walker's Mammals of the World. Johns Hopkins University Press, 1991. ISBN 0801857899.
- Reid, Fiona, National Audubon Society. A field guide to mammals of North America, north of Mexico. Houghton Mifflin, 2006. ISBN 0395935962.
- Whitaker, John O., National Audubon Society. National Audubon Society field guide to North American mammals. Knopf, 1996. ISBN 0679446311.
- Wilson, Don E., Sue Ruff, American Society of Mammalogists. The Smithsonian book of North American mammals. Smithsonian Institution Press, 1999. ISBN 1560988452.

====== Canines ======
- Alderton, David (September 2008). Encyclopedia of Dogs (Hardcover). Bath: Parragon Inc. p. 384. ISBN 978-1-4075-2438-2.
- American Kennel Club. The complete dog book: Official publication of the American Kennel Club. Ballantine Books, 2006. ISBN 0345476263.
- Coile, D. Caroline (April 1, 2005). Encyclopedia of Dog Breeds: Profiles of More than 150 Breeds (2nd ed.). Barron's Educational Series, Incorporated. p. 368. ISBN 978-0-7641-5700-4.
- De Prisco, Andrew and James B. Johnson. Canine Lexicon. T. F. H. Publications, 1993.
- De Vito, Dominique (September 1, 2005). World Atlas of Dog Breeds (Print) (6th ed.). Neptune City, NJ Lanham, MD: TFH Publications, Inc. Distributed in the U.S. to the Bookstore and library trade by National Book Network. p. 960. ISBN 978-0-7938-0656-0.
- DK Publishing (July 15, 2013). The Dog Encyclopedia (Hardcover) (1st ed.). DK Adult. p. 360. ISBN 978-1-4654-0844-0.
- Morris, Desmond. Dogs: The ultimate dictionary of over 1,000 dog breeds. Trafalgar Square, 2002. ISBN 1570762198.
- Wilcox, Bonnie; Walkowicz, Chris (March 1995). Atlas of Dog Breeds of the World (Print) (5th ed.). Neptune City, NJ Lanham, MD: TFH Publications, Inc. Distributed in the U.S. to the Bookstore and library trade by National Book Network. p. 912. ISBN 978-0-7938-1284-4.

====== Cats ======
- Kelsey-Wood, Dennis. The Atlas of Cats of the World: Domesticated and Wild. T. F. H. Publications, 1989.

====== Cattle ======
- Felius, Marleen. Cattle breeds: An encyclopedia. Misset, 1995. ISBN 9054390174.

====== Horses ======
- Ensminger, M. F. The Complete Encyclopedia of Horses. A. S. Barnes, 1977.
- Griffin, James and Tom Gore. Horse Owner's Veterinary Handbook. Howell Book House, 1989.
- Hendricks, Bonnie L.; Dent, Anthony A. (30 August 2007). International Encyclopedia of Horse Breeds. University of Oklahoma Press. p. 42. ISBN 978-0-8061-3884-8.
- Kidd, Jane. International Encyclopedia of Horse Breeds. H. P. Books, 1986.
- Kidd, Jane. International Encyclopedia of Horse Breeds & Breeding. Crescent Books, 1989.

====== Primates ======
- Jacobsen, Lawrence, Raymond Hamel, Cynthia Robinson, Wisconsin Primate Research Center. Primate info net. Wisconsin Primate Research Center, University of Wisconsin. .

====== Human ======
- Blakemore, Colin, Sheila Jennett, Alan Cuthbert. The Oxford companion to the body. Oxford University Press, 2001. ISBN 019852403X.
- Cooper, David N., Nature Publishing Group. Nature encyclopedia of the human genome. Nature Publishing Group, 2003. ISBN 0333803868.
- Dulbecco, Renato. Encyclopedia of Human Biology. Academic Press, 1991.
- Kristic, Radivoj V. Illustrated Encyclopedia of Human Histology. Springer-Verlag, 1984.
- Ramachandran, V. S. Encyclopedia of the human brain. Academic Press, 2002. ISBN 0122272102.
- Ulijaszek, Stanley J., Francis E. Johnston, M. A. Preece. The Cambridge encyclopedia of human growth and development. Cambridge University Press, 1998. ISBN 0521560462.

====== Human evolution ======
- Jones, Stephen. Cambridge Encyclopedia of Human Evolution. Cambridge, 1993.
- Milner, Richard. Encyclopedia of Evolution: Humanity's Search for Its Origins. Facts on File, 1990.
- Tattersall, Ian. The Encyclopedia of Human Evolution and Prehistory. Garland. ISBN 0815316968.

===== Reptiles and Amphibians =====
- Behler, John L., F. Wayne King, National Audubon Society. The Audubon Society field guide to North American reptiles and amphibians. Knopf, 1979. ISBN 0394508246.
- Bonin, Franck, Bernard Devaux, Alain Dupré. Turtles of the world. Johns Hopkins University Press, 2006. ISBN 0801884969.
- Campbell, Jonathan A., William W. Lamar, Edmund D. Brodie III. The venomous reptiles of the Western Hemisphere. Comstock, 2004. ISBN 0801441412.
- Center for North American Herpetology. Center for North American herpetology: Promoting the preservation and conservation of North American amphibians, crocodilians, reptiles, and turtles through scholarship and information. Center for North American Herpetology. .
- Conant, Roger, Joseph T. Collins, Isabelle Hunt Conant. A field guide to reptiles and amphibians: Eastern and central North America. Houghton Mifflin, 1998. ISBN 0395904528.
- Ernst, Carl H. Evelyn M. Ernst. Snakes of the United States and Canada. Smithsonian Books, 2003. ISBN 1588340198.
- Halliday, Tim and Kraig Alder. The Encyclopedia of Reptiles and Amphibians. Facts on File, 1986.
- Rossi, John, Roxanne Rossi. Snakes of the United States and Canada: Natural history and care in captivity. Krieger, 2003. ISBN 1575240319.
- Smith, Hobart Muir. Handbook of lizards: Lizards of the United States and of Canada. Comstock, 1995. ISBN 0801482364.
- Stebbins, Robert C. A field guide to western reptiles and amphibians. Houghton Mifflin, 2003. ISBN 0395982723.

==== Fungi ====
- Hall, Ian R. Edible and poisonous mushrooms of the world. Timber Press, 2003. ISBN 0881925861.
- Kuo, Michael, John David Moore, Darvin DeShazer. 100 edible mushrooms. University of Michigan Press, 2007. ISBN 9780472031269.
- Kuo, Michael. MushroomExpert.com. Michael Kuo, 2000-. . 2000–.
- Lincoff, Gary, Carol Nehring, National Audubon Society. The Audubon Society field guide to North American mushrooms. Knopf, 1981. ISBN 0394519922.
- McKnight, Kent H., Vera B. McKnight, National Audubon Society. A field guide to mushrooms, North America. Houghton Mifflin, 1998. ISBN 0395421012.
- Phillips, Roger, Geoffrey Kibby, Nicky Foy. Mushrooms and other fungi of North America. Firefly Books, 2005. ISBN 1554071151.
- Turner, Nancy J., Adam F. Szczawinski. Common poisonous plants and mushrooms of North America. Timber Press, 1991. ISBN 0881921793.

==== Plants ====
- Bailey, Liberty Hyde & Ethel Zoe Bailey. Hortus Third: A Concise Dictionary of Plants Cultivated in the United States and Canada. Macmillan, 3rd ed., 1976.
- Barker, Joan. The encyclopedia of North American wild flowers. Parragon, 2004. ISBN 1405430354.
- Beckett, Kenneth A. The RHS Encyclopedia of House Plants Including Greenhouse Plants. Salem House, 1987.
- Brickell, Christopher. The American Horticultural Society Encyclopedia of Garden Plants. Macmillan, 1989.
- Brickell, Christopher, Trevor J. Cole, American Horticultural Society. American Horticultural Society encyclopedia of plants and flowers. DK Publishing, 2002. ISBN 0789489937.
- Burrows, George E. Toxic plants of North America. Wiley-Blackwell, 2012. ISBN 978-0-8138-2034-7, doi:10.1002/9781118413425.
- Dirr, Michael. Dirr's hardy trees and shrubs: An illustrated encyclopedia. Timber Press, 1997. ISBN 0881924040.
- Flora of North America Association. Flora of North America. Flora of North America Association. .
- Flora of North America Editorial Committee. Flora of North America North of Mexico. Oxford University Press, 1993–2006. ISBN 0195057139.
- Gerard, John, Thomas Johnson. The herbal; or, General history of plants. Dover Publications, 1975. ISBN 048623147X.
- Graf, Alfred Byrd. Exotica Series 4 International: Pictorial Cyclopedia of Exotic Plants from Tropical and Near-Tropical Regions. Scribner's, 12th ed., 1985.
- Graf, Alfred Byrd. Hortica: A Color Cyclopedia of Garden Flora in All Climates and Indoor Plants. Macmillan, 1992.
- Graf, Alfred Byrd. Tropica: Color Cyclopedia of Exotic Plants. Scribner's, 3rd ed., 1986.
- Herwig, Rob. The New Good Housekeeping Encyclopedia of House Plants. Hearst, rev. ed., 1990.
- Heywood, V. H., D. M. Moore, I. B. K. Richardson. Flowering plants of the world. Oxford University Press, 1993. ISBN 0195210379.
- Heywood, Vernon H. and Stuart R. Chat. Popular Encyclopedia of Plants. Cambridge, 1982.
- Hillier's Manual of Trees and Shrubs. Van Nostrand, 5th ed., 1983.
- Hogan, Sean. Flora: A gardener's encyclopedia. Timber Press, 2003. ISBN 0881925381.
- Hora, Bayard. The Oxford Encyclopedia of Trees of the World. Oxford, 1981.
- Kaufman, Sylvan Ramsey, Wallace Kaufman. Invasive plants: A guide to identification and the impacts and control of common North American species. Stackpole Books, 2007. ISBN 0811733653.
- Lowe, David W., John R. Matthews, Charles J. Moseley, World Wildlife Fund. The official World Wildlife Fund guide to endangered species of North America. Beacham, 1990–1994. ISBN 0933833172.
- Mitchell, Alan. Trees of North America. Facts on File, 1987.
- Moore, David M. The Marshall Cavendish Illustrated Encyclopedia of Plants and Earth Sciences. Marshall Cavendish, 1988.
- Nelson, Lewis S., Richard Shih, Michael J. Balick, Lewis R. Goldfrank, Andrew Weil, New York Botanical Garden. Handbook of poisonous and injurious plants. New York Botanical Garden; Springer, 2007. ISBN 0387312684.
- Ness, Bryan D. Magill's encyclopedia of science: Plant life. Salem Press, 2003. ISBN 1587650843.
- Phillips, Ellen and Colston Burrell. Rodale's Illustrated Encyclopedia of Perennials. Rodale, 1993.
- Quattrocchi, Umberto. CRC world dictionary of grasses: Common names, scientific names, eponyms, synonyms, and etymology. CRC/Taylor & Francis, 2006. ISBN 0849313031.
- Rätsch, Christian, Albert Hofmann, John R. Baker. The encyclopedia of psychoactive plants: Ethnopharmacology and its applications. Park Street Press, 2005. ISBN 0892819782.
- Solomon, Jim, Missouri Botanical Garden. W3Tropicos: VAST (VAScular Tropicos) nomenclatural database. Missouri Botanical Garden. .
- Spellenberg, Richard. National Audubon Society field guide to North American wildflowers: Western region. Knopf, 2001. ISBN 0375402330.
- Stace, Clive A., Hilli Thompson. New flora of the British Isles. Cambridge University Press, 1997. ISBN 0521589355.
- Stickney, Robert R. Encyclopedia of aquaculture. Wiley, 2000. ISBN 0471291013.
- Thieret, John W, William A. Niering, Nancy C. Olmstead. National Audubon Society field guide to North American wildflowers: eastern region. Alfred A. Knopf, 2001. ISBN 0375402322.
- Turner, Nancy J., Adam F. Szczawinski. Common poisonous plants and mushrooms of North America. Timber Press, 1991. ISBN 0881921793.
- Webere, Ewald. Invasive plant species of the world: A reference guide to environmental weeds. CABI, 2003. ISBN 0851996957.
- Zomlefer, Wendy B. Guide to flowering plant families. University of North Carolina Press, 1994. ISBN 0807821608.

===== Botany and horticulture =====
- Bradley, Fern Marshall & Barbara W. Ellis. Rodale's All-New Encyclopedia of Organic Gardening: The Indispensable Resource for Every Gardener. Rodale, 1992.
- Brickell, Christopher. American Horticultural Society Encyclopedia of Gardening. Dorling Kindersley. ISBN 0789496534.
- Everett, Thomas H. The New York Botanical Garden Illustrated Encyclopedia of Horticulture. Garland, 1981–1982.
- Fell, Derek. The Encyclopedia of Flowers. Smithmark, 1993.
- Huxley, Anthony. The New Royal Horticultural Society Dictionary of Gardening. Stockton Press, 1992.
- Moggi, Guido and Luciano Guignolini. Simon & Schuster's Guide to Garden Flowers. Simon & Schuster, 1983.
- Seymour, E. L. D. The Wise Garden Encyclopedia. HarperCollins, rev. ed., 1990.
- Shoemaker, Candice A., Chicago Botanic Garden. Encyclopedia of gardens: History and design. Fitzroy Dearborn, 2001. ISBN 1579581730.
- Taylor, Patrick. The Oxford companion to the garden. Oxford University Press, 2006. ISBN 9780198662556.
- Taylor's Encyclopedia of Gardening. Houghton Mifflin, 4th ed., 1961.
- Thomas, Brian, Denis J. Murphy, Brian G. Murray. Encyclopedia of applied plant sciences. Elsevier Academic, 2003. ISBN 0122270509.
- Westcott's Plant Disease Handbook. Van Nostrand, 5th ed., 1990.
- Woods, Christopher. Encyclopedia of Perennials: A Gardener's Guide. Facts on File, 1982.
- Wyman's Gardening Encyclopedia. Macmillan, 2nd ed., 1986.
- Yepsen, Roger B., Jr. The Encyclopedia of Natural Insect and Disease Control. Rodale, rev. ed., 1984.

===== Trees =====
- Burns, Russell M., Barbara H. Honkala, U. S. Dept. of Agriculture, Forest Service. Silvics of North America. U. S. Dept. of Agriculture, Forest Service. 1990. .
- Cafferty, Steve. Firefly encyclopedia of trees. Firefly Books, 2005. ISBN 1554070511.
- Davis, Richard C. Encyclopedia of American forest and conservation history. Macmillan; Collier Macmillan, 1983. ISBN 0029073502.
- Encyclopedia of Wood: A Tree-by-Tree Guide to the World's Most Versatile Resources. Facts on File, 1989.
- Little, Elbert Luther, Sonja Bullaty, Angelo Lomeo, National Audubon Society. The Audubon Society field guide to North American trees. Knopf, 1980. ISBN 0394507614.
- Plotnik, Arthur, Mary Phelan Morton Arboretum. The urban tree book: An uncommon field guide for city and town. Three Rivers Press, 2000. ISBN 0812931033.
- Preston, Richard Joseph, Richard R. Braham. North American trees. Iowa State Press, 2002. ISBN 0813815266.
- Rushforth, Keith, Charles Hollis. National Geographic field guide to the trees of North America. National Geographic, 2006. ISBN 0792253108.
- Russell, Tony, Catherine Cutler. Trees: An illustrated identifier and encyclopedia. Hermes House, 2003. ISBN 1843099764.

=== Biochemistry ===
- Scott, Thomas A. & Mary Brewer. Concise Encyclopedia of Biochemistry. Walter de Gruyter, 2nd ed., 1988.

=== Bioethics ===
- Post, Stephen Garrard. Encyclopedia of bioethics. Third edition. Macmillan Reference USA, 2003. ISBN 0028657748. ISSN 0950-4125; DOI:10.1108/09504120510573477. (5-Volume Set; 3062 pages).
- Reich, Warren Thomas Encyclopedia of Bioethics. First edition. New York: Free Press, 1978. ISBN 0029261805. ISBN 978-0029261804. (4-Volume Set; 1933 pages)
- Reich, Warren Thomas Encyclopedia of Bioethics. Second edition. New York: Free Press, 1982. (5-Volume Set; 2950 pages)
- Reich, Warren Thomas Encyclopedia of Bioethics. Third edition. New York: Simon & Schuster Macmillan, 1995; London: Simon and Schuster and Prentice Hall International, c1995. Rev. ed. (5-Volume Set; 2950 pages; 464 articles) ISBN 0028973550. ISBN 978-0028973555.

=== Food, nutrition, and agriculture ===
==== Agriculture ====
- American Veterinary Medical Association. AVMA: American Veterinary Medical Association. American Veterinary Medical Association, 2006-..
- Arntzen, Charles J. and Ellen M. Ritter. Encyclopedia of agricultural science. Academic Press, 1994. ISBN 0122266706.
- Bailey, Liberty Hyde. Cyclopedia of American agriculture. Macmillan, 1909.
- Bailey, L. H., Ethel Zoe Bailey, Liberty Hyde Bailey Hortorium. Hortus third: A concise dictionary of plants cultivated in the United States and Canada. Macmillan, 1976. ISBN 0025054708.
- Bains, William. Biotechnology from A to Z. Oxford University Press, 2004. ISBN 0198524986.
- Brooklyn Botanic Garden, Janet Marinelli, and Stephen K-M. Tim. Brooklyn Botanic Garden gardener's desk reference. Henry Holt, 1998. ISBN 0805050957.
- Burns, Russell M., Barbara H. Honkala, U.S. Dept. of Agriculture, Forest Service. Silvics of North America. U.S. Dept. of Agriculture, Forest Service, 1990. .
- Burrows, George E. Toxic plants of North America. Wiley-Blackwell, 2012. ISBN 0813820340..
- Cordell, Charles E., U.S. Forest Service. Forest nursery pests. U.S. Department of Agriculture, Forest Service, 1989.
- Davis, Richard C. Encyclopedia of American forest and conservation history. Macmillan; Collier Macmillan, 1983. ISBN 0029073502.
- Felius, Marleen. Cattle breeds: An encyclopedia. Misset, 1995. ISBN 9054390174.
- Flickinger, Michael C. and Steven W. Drew. Encyclopedia of bioprocess technology: Fermentation, biocatalysis, and bioseparation. John Wiley & Sons, 1999.
- Goodman, Robert M. Encyclopedia of plant and crop science. M. Dekker, 2004. ISBN 0824709446. .
- Goreham, Gary. Encyclopedia of rural America: The land and people. ABC-CLIO, 1997. ISBN 0874368421.
- Hanelt, Peter, R. Buttner, Rudolf Mansfield Institut für Pflanzengenetik und Kulturpflanzenforschung Gatersleben, Germany. Mansfeld's encyclopedia of agricultural and horticultural crops (except ornamentals). Springer, 2001. ISBN 3540410171.
- Heldman, Dennis R. Encyclopedia of agricultural, food, and biological engineering. Marcel Dekker, 2003. ISBN 0824709381.
- Hillel, Daniel and Jerry L. Hatfield. Encyclopedia of soils in the environment. Elsevier/Academic Press, 2005. ISBN 0123485304.
- Holton, James R., Judith A. Curry, J. A. Pyle. Encyclopedia of atmospheric sciences. Academic Press, 2003. ISBN 0122270908.
- Howard, Philip H. Hearth Taub Printup. Handbook of environmental degradation rates. Lewis, 1991. ISBN 0873713583.
- Johnson, Warren T., Howard H. Lyon, C. S. Koehler. Insects that feed on trees and shrubs. Comstock Publishing Associates, 1991. ISBN 0801426022.
- Knobil, Ernst and Jimmy D. Neill. Encyclopedia of reproduction. Academic Press, 1998. ISBN 0122270207.
- Lal, R. Encyclopedia of soil science. Taylor & Francis, 2006. ISBN 0849350530.
- Lederberg, Joshua. Encyclopedia of microbiology. Academic Press, 2000. ISBN 0122268008.
- Lord, Tony and Andrew Lawson. The encyclopedia of planting combinations: The ultimate visual guide to successful plant harmony. Firefly, 2002. ISBN 1552096238.
- Maloy, Otis C. and Timothy D. Murray. Encyclopedia of plant pathology. Wiley, 2001. ISBN 0471298174.
- Melhorn, Heinz. Encyclopedia of parasitology. Springer, 2008. ISBN 3540489975.
- Montgomery, John H. Agrochemicals desk reference. CRC Press, 1997. ISBN 1566701678.
- Nau, Jim. Ball culture guide: The encyclopedia of seed germination. Ball, 1999. ISBN 188305219X.
- Plimmer, Jack R. Encyclopedia of agrochemicals. Wiley-Interscience, 2003. ISBN 0471193631.
- Quattrocchi, Umberto. CRC world dictionary of grasses: Common names, scientific names, eponyms, synonyms, and etymology. CRC/Taylor & Francis, 2006. ISBN 0849313031.
- Roginski, Hubert, John W. Puquay, P. F. Fox. Encyclopedia of dairy sciences. Academic Press, 2003. ISBN 0122272358. .
- Schapsmeier, Edward L. and Frederick H. Schapsmeier. Encyclopedia of American Agricultural History. Greenwood, 1975.
- Scharpf, Robert, U. S. Forest Service. Diseases of Pacific Coast conifers. Forest Service, U.S. Dept. of Agriculture, 1993. ISBN 0160417651.
- Solomon, J. D., U.S. Dept. of Agriculture, Forest Service. Guide to insect borers in North American broadleaf trees and shrubs. U.S. Dept. of Agriculture, Forest Service, 1995.
- Stickney, Robert R. Encyclopedia of aquaculture. Wiley, 2000. ISBN 0471291013.
- Talbot, Ross B. Historical dictionary of the international food agencies: FAO, WFP, WFC, IFAD. Scarecrow Press, 1994. ISBN 0810828472.
- Thomas, Brian, Denis J. Murphy, Brian G. Murray. Encyclopedia of applied plant sciences. Elsevier Academic, 2003. ISBN 0122270509.
- U. S. Food and Drug Administration. FDA directory. Food and Drug Law Institute, 1900s–.
- Wexler, Philip, Bruce D. Anderson, Ann de Peyster. Encyclopedia of toxicology. Elsevier Academic, 2005. ISBN 0127453512.
- Wrigley, Colin W., Harold Corke, Charles E. Walker. Encyclopedia of grain science. Elsevier Academic Press, 2004. ISBN 0127654909.

==== Food ====
- Albala, Ken. Food cultures of the world encyclopedia. Greenwood, 2011. ISBN 9780313376269.
- Claiborne, Craig. The New York Times Food Encyclopedia. Times Books, 1985.
- Considine, Douglas M. & Glenn D. Considine. Foods and Food Production Encyclopedia. Van Nostrand, 1982.
- Coyle, L. Patrick, Jr.. The World Encyclopedia of Food. Facts on File, 1982.
- Encyclopedia of Food Engineering. 2nd ed., AVI Publishing, 1986.
- Encyclopedia of Food Science. AVI Publishing, 1978.
- Encyclopedia of Food Technology. AVI Publishing, 1974.
- Ensminger, Audrey H. Foods and Nutrition Encyclopedia. Pegus Press, 1983.
- Francis, F. J. Encyclopedia of food science and technology. Wiley, 2000. ISBN 0471192856.
- Horn, Jane and Janet Fletcher. Cooking A to Z. Ortho Books, 1988.
- Hui, Y. H. Encyclopedia of Food Science and Technology. Wiley, 1992.
- Hui, Y. H., and J. D. Culbertson. Handbook of food science, technology, and engineering. Taylor & Francis, 2006. ISBN 9780849398476.
- Kraig, Bruce and Colleen Taylor Sen. Street food around the world: an encyclopedia of food and culture. ABC-CLIO, 2013. ISBN 9781598849547.
- Macrae, Robert. Encyclopedia of Food Science, Food Technology, and Nutrition. Academic Press, 1993.
- Mariani, John F. The Dictionary of American Food and Drink. 2nd ed., Hearst, 1994.
- Montagne, Prosper & Robert J. Courtine. Larousse Gastronomique: All-New American Edition of the World's Greatest Culinary Encyclopedia. Rev. ed., Crown, 1988.
- Stobart, Tom. Cook's Encyclopedia. Harper & Row, 1981.

===== Nutrition =====
- Ensminger, Audrey H. Foods and Nutrition Encyclopedia. Pegus Press, 1983.
- Food for Health: A Nutrition Encyclopedia. Pegus Press, 1986.
- Margen, Sheldon. The Wellness Encyclopedia of Food and Nutrition: How to Buy, Store, and Prepare Every Variety of Fresh Food. Rebus, 1992.
- Mount Sinai School of Medicine Complete Book of Nutrition. St. Martin's Press, 1990.
- Tver, David F. and Percy Russell. Nutrition and Health Encyclopedia. 2nd ed., Van Nostrand, 1989.
- Winick, Myron. The Columbia Encyclopedia of Nutrition. Putnam, 1988.
- Yudin, John. Penguin Encyclopedia of Nutrition. Viking, 1985.

===== Wines, beers, and spirits =====
- Alexis Lichine's New Encyclopedia of Wines and Spirits. 5th ed., Knopf, 1987.
- Grossman's Guide to Wines, Beers, & Spirits. 7th ed., Scribner's, 1983.
- Hugh Johnson's Modern Encyclopedia of Wine. 3rd ed., Simon & Schuster, 1991.
- Hugh Johnson's World Atlas of Wine. 3rd ed., Simon & Schuster, 1985.
- Robinson, Jancis. The Oxford companion to wine. Oxford University Press, 1999. ISBN 019866236X.
- Schoonmaker, Frank. The New Frank Schoonmaker Encyclopedia of Wine. Rev. ed., Morrow, 1988.

=== Health, medicine, and drugs ===
- Adelman, George. Encyclopedia of Neuroscience. Birkhauser Boston, 1987.
- Fishbein, Morris. Fishbein's Illustrated Medical and Health Encyclopedia. H. S. Struttman, 1983.
- Who's who in medicine and healthcare. Marquis Who's Who, 1996–. ISSN 0000-1708.

==== Drugs ====
- Plumb, Donald C. Plumb's veterinary drug handbook. PharmaVet; Distributed by Wiley, c2011. ISBN 9780470959640.
- Rätsch, Christian, Albert Hofmann, John R. Baker. The encyclopedia of psychoactive plants: Ethnopharmacology and its applications. Park Street Press, 2005. ISBN 0892819782.
- Stafford, Peter. Psychedelics Encyclopedia. 3rd ed., Ronin Publishing, 1992.
- Swarbrick, James and James C. Boylan. Encyclopedia of Pharmaceutical Technology. Marcel Dekker, 1988-.

===== Drug and alcohol abuse =====
- Evans, Glen. The Encyclopedia of Drug Abuse. 2nd ed., Facts on File, 1991.
- Fay, John. Alcohol/Drug Abuse Dictionary and Encyclopedia. Charles C. Thomas, 1988.
- O'Brien, Robert & Morris Chaftetz. The Encyclopedia of Alcoholism. 2nd ed., Facts on File, 1991.

==== Health ====
- Accomasso, V. (1995). Enciclopedia della medicina (in Italian). Vallardi A. ISBN 978-88-11-93806-4.
- Ammer, Christine (1997). Gesundheitslexikon der Frau: Anatomie, Diagnose, Therapie, Medikamente, Hormone, Sexualität, Schwangerschaft und Geburt, Seelische Gesundheit (in German). Dt. Taschenbuch-Verlag. ISBN 978-3-423-36014-2.
- Axt-Gadermann, Michaela (2005). Bertelsmann, Das grosse Gesundheitslexikon (in German). Wissen-Media-Verlag. ISBN 978-3-577-10373-2.
- Baert, Albert L. (2007). Encyclopedia of Diagnostic Imaging. Springer. ISBN 978-3-540-35278-5.
- Beers, Mark H.; Fletcher, Andrew J. (2008). Encyclopédie médicale: Le Manuel Merck (in French). Larousse. ISBN 978-2-03-582305-2.
- Breslow, Lester (2002). Encyclopedia of Public Health. MacMillan USA. ISBN 978-0-02-865350-1.
- Bullough, Vern L. (2001). Encyclopedia of Birth Control. ABC-CLIO. ISBN 978-1-57607-181-6.
- Fermie, Peter; Shepherd, Stephen; Kelly, Robert F. (2004). Family Health Encyclopedia: The Comprehensive Guide to the Whole Family's Health Needs. Lorenz Books. ISBN 978-0-7548-1162-6.
- Fink, George. Encyclopedia of stress. Elsevier, 2007. ISBN 0120885034.
- Gullotta, Thomas P.; Bloom, Martin (2003). Encyclopedia of Primary Prevention and Health Promotion. Springer. ISBN 978-0-306-47296-1.
- Hamburger, Jean; Méry, Jean-Philippe; Leporrier, Michel (1981). Petite encyclopédie médicale: guide de pratique médicale (in French). Flammarion. 1,421 pages. ISBN 9782257123008.
- Jacoby, David B.; Youngson, R. M. (2004). Encyclopedia Of Family Health. Marshall Cavendish. ISBN 978-0-7614-7486-9.
- Kipman, Simon-Daniel (2005). Dictionnaire critique des termes de psychiatrie et de santé mentale (in French). Wolters Kluwer France. ISBN 978-2-7040-1163-6.
- Langer, Jerk W. (2009). Politikens bog om barnets sygdomme (in Danish). Gyldendals Bogklubber. ISBN 978-87-03-03314-3.
- Loue, Sana; Sajatovic, Martha (2008). Encyclopedia of Aging and Public Health. Springer. ISBN 978-0-387-33753-1.
- Loue, Sana; Sajatovic, Martha (2012). Encyclopedia of Immigrant Health. Springer. ISBN 978-1-4419-5659-0.
- Lovejoy, Frederick H. (1987). The New child health encyclopedia: the complete guide for parents. Delacorte Press. ISBN 978-0-385-29541-3.
- Macmillan Health Encyclopedia. Macmillan, 1993.
- The Marshall Cavendish Encyclopedia of Family Health. Marshall Cavendish, 1991.
- Navarra, Tova (2004). The Encyclopedia of Vitamins, Minerals, and Supplements. Infobase Publishing. ISBN 978-1-4381-2103-1.
- Ohm, Christian; Curic, Anton (1999). Gesundheitslexikon von A – Z.: 3000 verständlich formulierte Einträge zu Krankheiten und ihren Symptomen, Naturheilverfahren und Vorsorge (in German). Eco Verlag GmbH. ISBN 978-3-933468-52-9.
- QA International Collectif (2010). L'encyclopédie Familiale de la Santé: Comprendre, Prévenir, Soigner (in French). Québec Amerique. ISBN 978-2-7644-0865-0.
- Quevauvilliers, Jacques; Perlemuter, Léon; Perlemuter, Gabriel (2009). Dictionnaire médical de l'infirmière (in French). Elsevier Masson. ISBN 978-2-9941008-0-5.
- Reiche, Dagmar (2003). Roche-Lexikon Medizin (in German). Urban & Fischer. ISBN 978-3-437-15180-4.
- Reuter, Peter (2004). Springer Lexikon Medizin (in German). Springer DE. ISBN 978-3-540-20412-1.
- Rizzoli (2001). Grande Enciclopedia Rizzoli della Salute e del Benessere. Con 6 CD-ROM (in Italian). Rizzoli. ISBN 978-88-17-93198-4.
- Ronzio, Robert A. (2003). The Encyclopedia of Nutrition and Good Health. Infobase Publishing. ISBN 978-0-8160-6630-8.
- Rothenberg, Robert E. (1984). Enciclopedia Medica Garzanti (in Italian). Garzanti.
- Turkington, Carol; Mitchell, Deborah R. (2010). The Encyclopedia of Alzheimer's Disease. Infobase Publishing. ISBN 978-1-4381-2858-0.
- U.S. National Library Medicine (2012): MedlinePlus including the freely accessible Medical Encyclopedia.
- Wagman, Richard J., ed. (1987). The medical and health encyclopedia. J.G. Ferguson Pub. Co. ISBN 978-0-89434-077-2.
- Wellness Encyclopedia. Houghton Mifflin, 1991.

===== Physical disorders =====
- Wynbrandt, James & Mark D. Ludman. The Encyclopedia of Genetic Disorders and Birth Defects. Facts on File, 1991.

====== Hearing disorders ======
- Turkington, Carol and Allen Sussman. Encyclopedia of Deafness and Hearing Disorders. Facts on File, 1992.
- Van Cleve, John V. Gallaudet Encyclopedia of Deaf People and Deafness. McGraw-Hill, 1987.

====== Vision impairment ======
- Sardegna, Jill & T. Otis Paul. The Encyclopedia of Blindness and Vision Impairment. Facts on File, 1991.

===== Women's health =====
- Ammer, Christine. The New A to Z of Women's Health: A Concise Encyclopedia. Facts on File, 1989.
- Foley, Denise and Eileen Nechas. Women's Encyclopedia of Health & Emotional Healing. Rodale, 1993.
- New Our Bodies, Ourselves. Rev. ed., Simon & Schuster, 1992.

==== Medicine ====
- Bailey, Hamilton, W. J. Bishop, Harold Ellis. Bailey and Bishop's notable names in medicine and surgery. Lewis, 1983. ISBN 0718604660.
- Bendiner, Jessica, Elmer Bendiner. Biographical dictionary of medicine. Facts on File, 1990. ISBN 0816018642.
- Berkow, Robert. The Merck Manual of Diagnosis and Therapy. 16th ed., Merck, 1992.
- Bremer, Sydney, Jeffrey H. Miller, William Broughton. Encyclopedia of genetics. Academic Press, 2002. ISBN 0122270800.
- Bynum, W. F., Helen Bynum. Dictionary of medical biography. Greenwood Press, 2006. ISBN 0313328773.
- Clayman, Charles B. The American Medical Association Encyclopedia of Medicine. Random House, 1989.
- Delves, Peter J., Ivan M. Roitt. Encyclopedia of immunology. Academic Press, 1998. ISBN 0122267656.
- Fischer, Isidor. Biographisches Lexikon der hervorragenden Ärzte der letzten 50 Jahre. 1932–33.
- Ganten, Detlev, Klaus Ruckpaul. Encyclopedic reference of genomics and proteomics in molecular medicine. Springer, 2005. ISBN 3540442448.
- Gomez, Joan. Dictionary of Symptoms. Rev. ed., Stein & Day, 1985.
- Griffith, H. Winter. Complete Guide to Symptoms, Illness & Surgery. 2nd ed., Price Stern Sloan, 1989.
- Hafner, Arthur Wayne, Fred W. Hunter, B. Michael Tarpey. Directory of deceased American physicians, 1804–1929: A genealogical guide to over 149,000 medical practitioners providing brief biographical sketches drawn from the American Medical Association's Deceased Physician Masterfile. American Medical Association, c1993. ISBN 0899705278.
- Hirsch, August, Ernst Julius Gurlt, A. Wernich, W. Haberling. Biographisches Lexikon der hervorragenden Ärzte aller Zeiten und Völker. Urban & Schwarzenberg, 1929–1934. (German)
- Jorde, Lynn B. Encyclopedia of genetics, genomics, proteomics, and bioinformatics. John Wiley and Sons, 2005. ISBN 9780470849743.
- Kahl, Günter. The dictionary of gene technology: Genomics, transcriptomics, proteomics. Wiley-VCH, 2004. ISBN 3527307656.
- Kaufman, Martin, Stuart Galishoff, Todd Lee Savitt. Dictionary of American medical biography. Greenwood Press, 1984. ISBN 031321378X.
- Kazazian, Haig H., John Wiley & Sons. Wiley encyclopedia of molecular medicine. John Wiley & Sons, 2002. ISBN 0471374946.
- Kaufman, Martin, Joellen Watson Hawkins, Loretta P. Higgins, Alice Howell Friedman. Dictionary of American nursing biography. Greenwood Press, 1988. ISBN 0313245207.
- Kelly, Howard A., Walter L. Burrage. Dictionary of American medical biography: Lives of eminent physicians of the United States and Canada, from the earliest times. London: D. Appleton and Co., 1928.
- Leroy, Francis. A century of Nobel prize recipients: Chemistry, physics, and medicine. Marcel Dekker, 2003. ISBN 0824708768.
  - Levin, Beatrice. Women and medicine. Scarecrow Press, 2002. ISBN 0810842386.
- Magner, Lois N. Doctors, nurses, and medical practitioners: A bio-bibliographical sourcebook. Greenwood Press, 1997. ISBN 0313294526.
- Marquis Who's Who. Who's who in medicine and healthcare. Marquis Who's Who, 1996-.
- Martin, Edward A., Peter Froggatt. A biographical encyclopedia of medical travel authors. Edwin Mellen Press, 2010–. ISBN 9780773436817.
- Meyers, Robert A. Encyclopedia of molecular cell biology and molecular medicine. Wiley-VCH Verlag, 2004–2005. ISBN 3527305432.
- Miller, Sigmund. Symptoms: The Complete Home Medical Encyclopedia. Crowell, 1976.
- Mosby Medical Encyclopedia. Rev. ed., Penguin USA, 1992.
- Munk, William, G. H. Brown, Richard Robertson Trail. The roll of the Royal College of Physicians of London: Comprising biographical sketches of all the eminent physicians whose names are recorded in the Annals... Royal College of Physicians of London, 1878–.
- Pagel, Julius. Biographisches Lexikon hervorragender Ärzte des neunzehnten Jahrhunderts. Urban & Schwarzenberg, 1901. (German).
- Physician's Desk Reference. Medical Economics, 1947-.
- Pinzon, Soledad Mata, Carlos Zolla, Diego Méndez Granados Instituto Nacional Indigenista (Mexico). Diccionario enciclopédico de la medicina tradicional mexicana. Instituto Nacional Indigenista, 1994. ISBN 9682961335.
- Rédei, G. P. Encyclopedic dictionary of genetics, genomics, and proteomics. Wiley-Liss, 2003. ISBN 0471268216.
- Riott, Ivan M. & Peter J. Delves. Encyclopedia of Immunology. Academic Press, 1992.
- Rosenfeld, Isadore. Symptoms. Simon & Schuster, 1989.
- Rothenberg, Robert. New Illustrated Medical Encyclopedia for Home Use. Rev. ed., Galahad, 1986.
- Scrivener, Laurice, J. Suzanne Barnes. A biographical dictionary of women healers: Midwives, nurses, and physicians. Oryx Press, 2002. ISBN 157356219X.
- Talbot, C. H., Eugene Ashby Hammond. The medical practitioners in medieval England: A biographical register. Wellcome Historical Medical Library, 1965.
- Tver, David F. & Howard F. Hunt. Encyclopedic Dictionary of Sports Medicine. Routledge, Chapman & Hall, 1986.
- Walton, John. The Oxford Companion to Medicine. Oxford, 1986.
- Webster, John G. Encyclopedia of Medical Devices and Instrumentation. Wiley, 1988.
- Windsor, Laura Lynn. Women in medicine: An encyclopedia. ABC-CLIO, 2002. ISBN 1576073920.
- The World Book/Rush-Presbyterian-St. Luke's Medical Center Medical Encyclopedia: Your Guide to Good Health. World Book, 1991.

===== History of medicine =====
- Bynum, W. F. and Roy Porter. Companion Encyclopedia of the History of Medicine. Routledge, 1994.
- McGrew, Roderick E. and Margaret P. McGrew. Encyclopedia of Medical History. McGraw-Hill, 1985.

===== Medical ethics =====
- Boyd, Kenneth M., Roger Higgs, A. J. Pinching. The new dictionary of medical ethics. BMJ Publ., 1997. ISBN 0727910019.

===== Medical tests =====
- Griffith, H. Winter. Complete Guide to Medical Tests. Fisher Books, 1988.
- Pinckney, Cathey and Edward R. Pinckney. Do-It-Yourself Medical Testing. 3rd ed., Facts on File, 1989.
- Pinckney, Cathey and Edward R. Pinckney. The Patient's Guide to Medical Tests. 3rd ed., Facts on File, 1986.
- Shtasel, Philip. Medical Tests and Diagnostic Procedures. HarperCollins, 1991.
- Sobel, David and Tom Ferguson. People's Book of Medical Tests. Summit Books, 1985.

===== Natural and alternative medicine =====
- Bricklin, Mark. Practical Encyclopedia of Natural Healing. Rev. ed., Rodale, 1983.
- Bricklin, Mark. Rodale's Encyclopedia of Natural Home Remedies. Rodale, 1982.
- Murray, Michael T. & Joseph E. Pizzorno. An Encyclopedia of Natural Medicine. Prima Publishing, 1991.
- Olsen, Kristin. Encyclopedia of Alternative Health Care. Pocket Books, 1990.
- Visual Encyclopedia of Natural Healing. Rodale, 1991.
- Wade, Carlson. Home Encyclopedia of Symptoms, Ailments, and Their Natural Remedies. Parker, 1991.

===== Nursing =====
- Marquis Who's Who. Who's who in American nursing. Marquis Who's Who, 1984-.

===== Veterinary medicine =====
- American Veterinary Medical Association. AVMA: American Veterinary Medical Association. American Veterinary Medical Association, 2006-..
- Concise Veterinary Dictionary. Oxford, 1988.
- Griffin, James and Tom Gore. Horse Owner's Veterinary Handbook. Howell Book House, 1989.
- Merck Veterinary Manual. Merck.
- Plumb, Donald C. Plumb's veterinary drug handbook. PharmaVet; Distributed by Wiley, c2011. ISBN 9780470959640.
- West, Geoffrey. Black's Veterinary Dictionary. Barnes & Noble Books, 1992.

=== Microbiology ===
- Britton, Gabriel. Encyclopedia of environmental microbiology. Wiley, 2002. ISBN 0471354503.
- Lederberg, Joshua. Encyclopedia of microbiology. Academic Press, 2000. ISBN 0122268008.

=== Neuroscience ===
- Houdé, Olivier Daniel Kayser, Vivian Waltz, Christian Cav. Dictionary of cognitive science: Neuroscience, psychology, artificial intelligence, linguistics, and philosophy. Psychology Press, 2004. ISBN 1579582516.

=== Prehistoric life ===
- Dixon, Dougal. The Macmillan Illustrated Encyclopedia of Dinosaurs and Prehistoric Animals: A Visual Who's Who of Prehistoric Life. Macmillan, 1988.
- Encyclopedia of Prehistoric Life. McGraw-Hill, 1979.

=== Shells ===
- Abbott, Tucker and Peter Dance. Compendium of Seashells. American Melacologists, 4th ed., 1990.
- Collector's Encyclopedia of Shells. McGraw-Hill, 1982.
- Rehder, Harald Alfred, James H. Carmichael, Jr., Carol Nehring, National Audubon Society. The Audubon Society field guide to North American seashells. Knopf, 1981. ISBN 0394519132.
- Wye, Kenneth F. The Encyclopedia of Shells. Facts on File, 1991.
- Murray, Michael T.
