= Raymond B. Cowles =

- Born: Raymond Bridgman Cowles; December 1, 1896; Amanzimtoti, Colony of Natal
- Died: December 7, 1975 (aged 79); Santa Barbara, California
- Education: Cornell University; Pomona College
- Known for: Reptile thermoregulation; Desert ecology
- Scientific career
- Fields: Herpetology
- Workplaces: UCLA
- Doctoral advisor: Albert Hazen Wright

Raymond Bridgman Cowles (pronounced "coals"; 1896–1975) was a herpetologist and professor at University of California, Los Angeles. Born in the British Colony of Natal (in what is now KwaZulu-Natal, South Africa) to American missionary parents, he emigrated to the United States in the early 1900s. He attended Pomona College as an undergrad and earned his PhD at Cornell University under Albert Hazen Wright. He is known for his research on desert ecology and reptile thermoregulation, as well as his popular books on environmental conservation. Cowles died of a heart attack in 1975 at the age of 79. An obituary called him one of America's first ecologists and conservationists.

Cowles is commemorated in the scientific names of three reptiles: the White Sands prairie lizard (Sceloporus cowlesi), the Angolan coral snake (Aspidelaps lubricus cowlesi), and the Yuman Desert fringe-toed lizard (Uma cowlesi).

== Books ==
- Milne, Lorus J.; Milne, Margery (1960-02-12). "Zulu Journal. Field notes of a naturalist in South Africa. Raymond B. Cowles, University of California Press, Berkeley, 1959". Science. 131 (3398): 406–407. doi:10.1126/science.131.3398.406-a. ISSN 0036-8075.
- Cowles, R.B.; Bakker, E.S. (1978). Desert Journal: Reflections of a Naturalist. University of California Press. ISBN 978-0-520-03636-9.
