= Indio Hills =

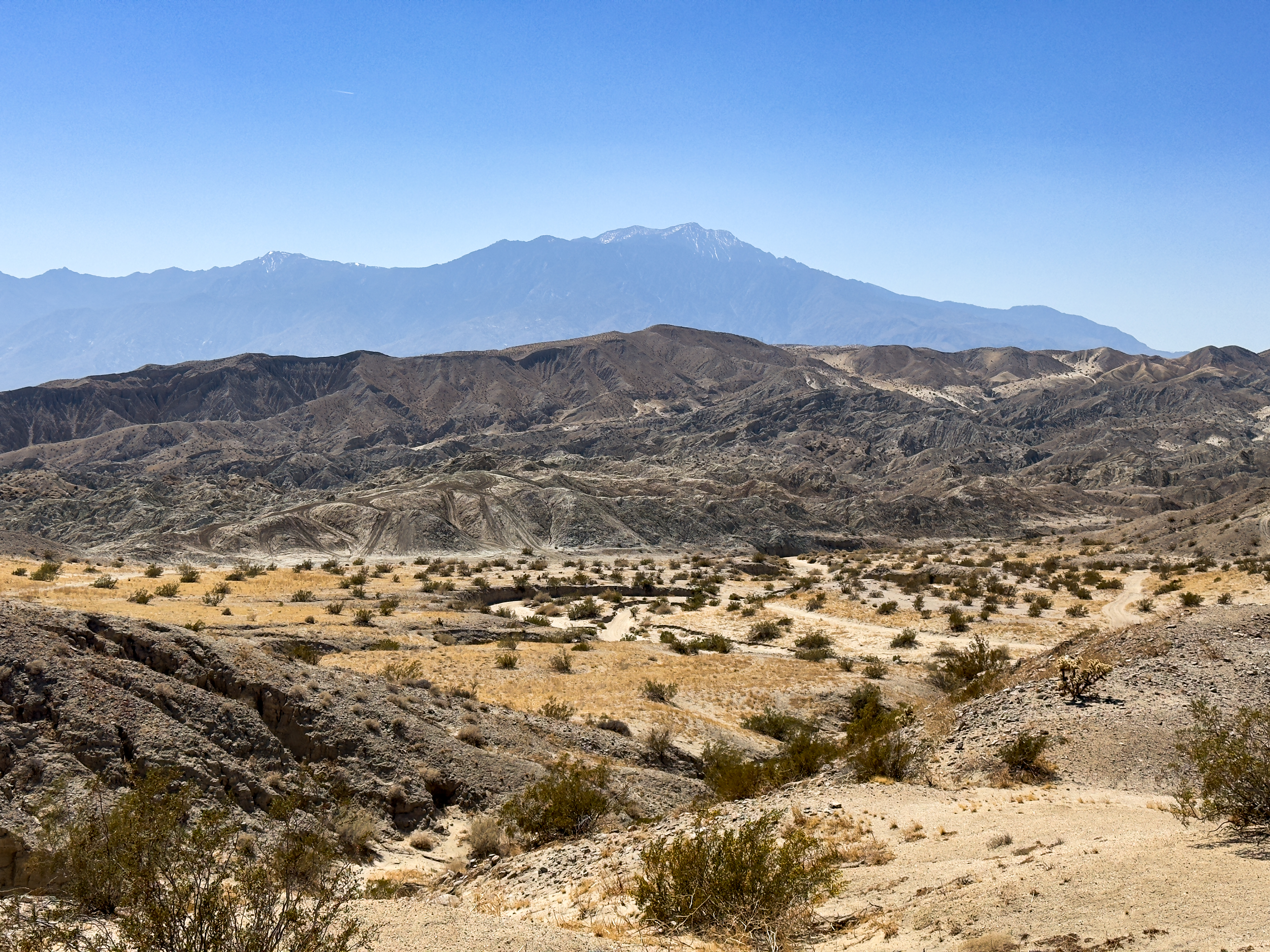
- Indio Hills with San Jacinto Peak in the background

Highest point
- Elevation: 1,744 ft (532 m)

Geography
- Location within California Location within the United States
- Country: United States
- State: California
- Region: Colorado Desert
- District(s): Coachella Valley, Riverside County
- Range coordinates: 33°50′18.061″N 116°19′9.033″W
- Topo map: USGS Myoma

The Indio Hills are a low mountain range in the Colorado Desert. located in Riverside County, California's Coachella Valley. The hills were named for their proximity to the city of Indio, and are sometimes referred to as the Indio Mud Hills or Indio Sand Hills.

== Geology ==
The Indio Hills are located in the Coachella Valley along the San Andreas Fault. The hills have natural springs along the fault. These support native California Fan Palm (Washingtonia filifera) oases habitats.

== Geographic Features ==
=== Peaks ===
- Edom Hill, 1,594 feet (486 m), 33.87018°N 116.42961°W: Located near Thousand Palms, Edom Hill is one of the highest peaks in the range. The prominence of the hill within the Coachella Valley has made it a chosen location for numerous communication towers.
- Flat Top Mountain, 823 feet (251 m), 33.86627°N 116.46840°W
- Múmawet Hill, 609 feet (186 m), 33.83574°N 116.30804°W: A promontory overlooking the Thousand Palms Oasis. https://newsfromnativecalifornia.com/the-renaming-of-mumawet-hill/

=== Canyons ===
- Pushawalla Canyon, 33.8238331°N 116.2818127°W
- Thousand Palms Canyon, 33.8368433°N 116.3103254°W

=== Oases ===
- Biskra Palms, 33.7902621°N 116.2513493°W: Named in honor of Biskra, Algeria.
- Hidden Palms, 33.8198853°N 116.3021139°W
- Macomber Palms, 33.8198853°N 116.2562662°W
- Pushawalla Palms, 33.7978285°N 116.2818127°W
- Thousand Palms Oasis, 33.8368433°N 116.3103254°W: The name origin for the community of Thousand Palms.
- Willis Palms, 33.8265819°N 116.3306839°W

== Parks ==
The Coachella Valley Preserve protects part of the Indio Hills and its surrounding areas. It contains the Coachella Valley National Wildlife Refuge, the Indio Hills Palms Park Property, and the Thousand Palms Oasis Preserve.

== See also ==
- Coachella Valley Preserve
