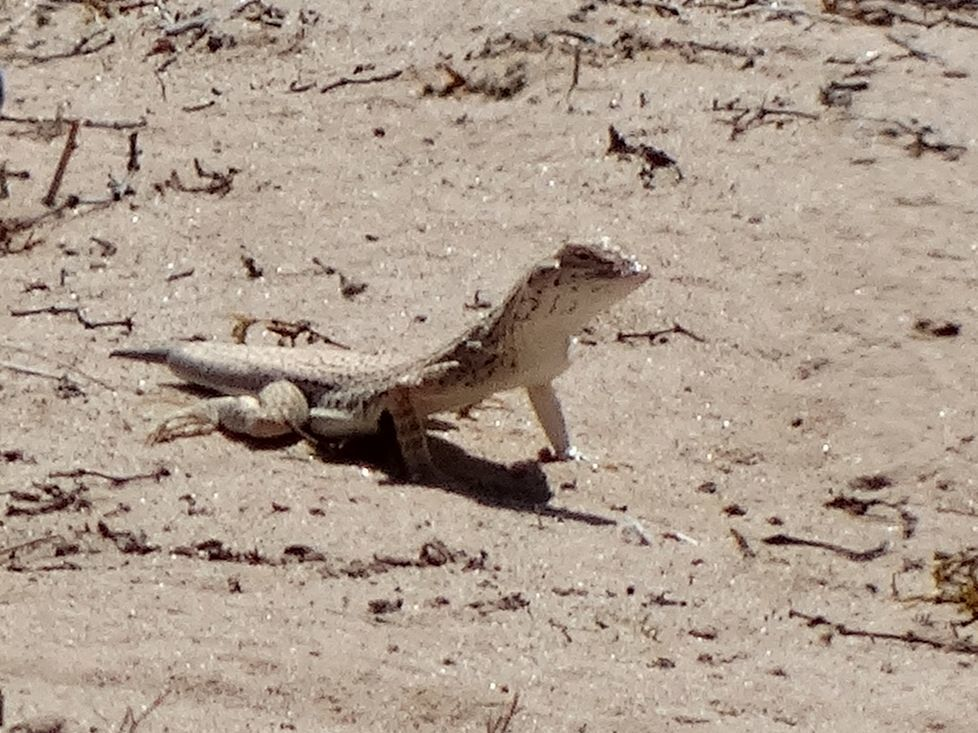

Conservation status
- Critically Imperiled (NatureServe)

Scientific classification
- Kingdom: Animalia
- Phylum: Chordata
- Class: Reptilia
- Order: Squamata
- Suborder: Iguania
- Family: Phrynosomatidae
- Genus: Uma
- Species: U. thurmanae

Binomial name
- Uma thurmanae Derycke, Gottscho, Mulcahy & de Queiroz, 2020

= Mohawk Dunes fringe-toed lizard =

Species of phrynosomatid lizard

The Mohawk Dunes fringe-toed lizard (Uma thurmanae) is a species of phrynosomatid lizard endemic to the U.S. state of Arizona. Its name is a reference to American actress Uma Thurman, as both a pun on the genus name Uma as well as a tribute to the actress for her conservation advocacy.

== Taxonomy ==
It is a cryptic species with few fixed morphological differences from other members of Uma, but has statistical morphological differences, and is also genetically distinct from the rest of the genus according to mtDNA. It was first identified as a potentially distinct species in 2001, which was further verified in a 2016 study, and was ultimately described as a distinct species, Uma thurmanae, in 2020. It is thought to be the most basal member of the Uma notata species complex.

== Distribution ==
It is restricted to the Mohawk Dunes, a dune system west of the Mohawk Mountains in southern Arizona.
