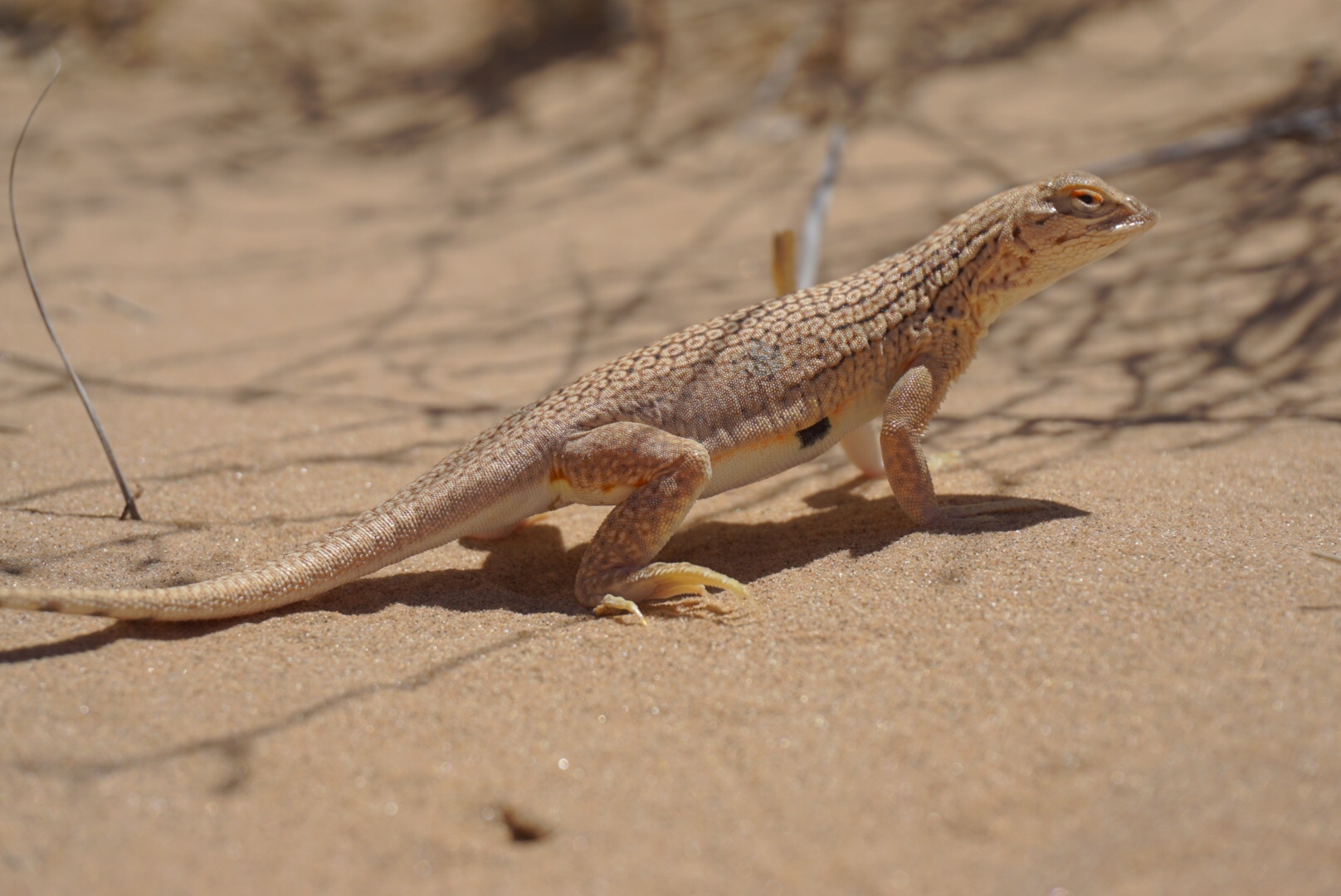

Scientific classification
- Kingdom: Animalia
- Phylum: Chordata
- Class: Reptilia
- Order: Squamata
- Suborder: Iguania
- Family: Phrynosomatidae
- Genus: Uma
- Species: U. cowlesi

Binomial name
- Uma cowlesi Heifetz, 1941

= Yuman Desert fringe-toed lizard =

Species of phrynosomatid lizard

The Yuman Desert fringe-toed lizard (Uma cowlesi) is a species of phrynosomatid lizard endemic to northwestern Mexico, although a hybrid population of it and Uma notata ranges north to southwestern Arizona in the United States.

== Taxonomy ==
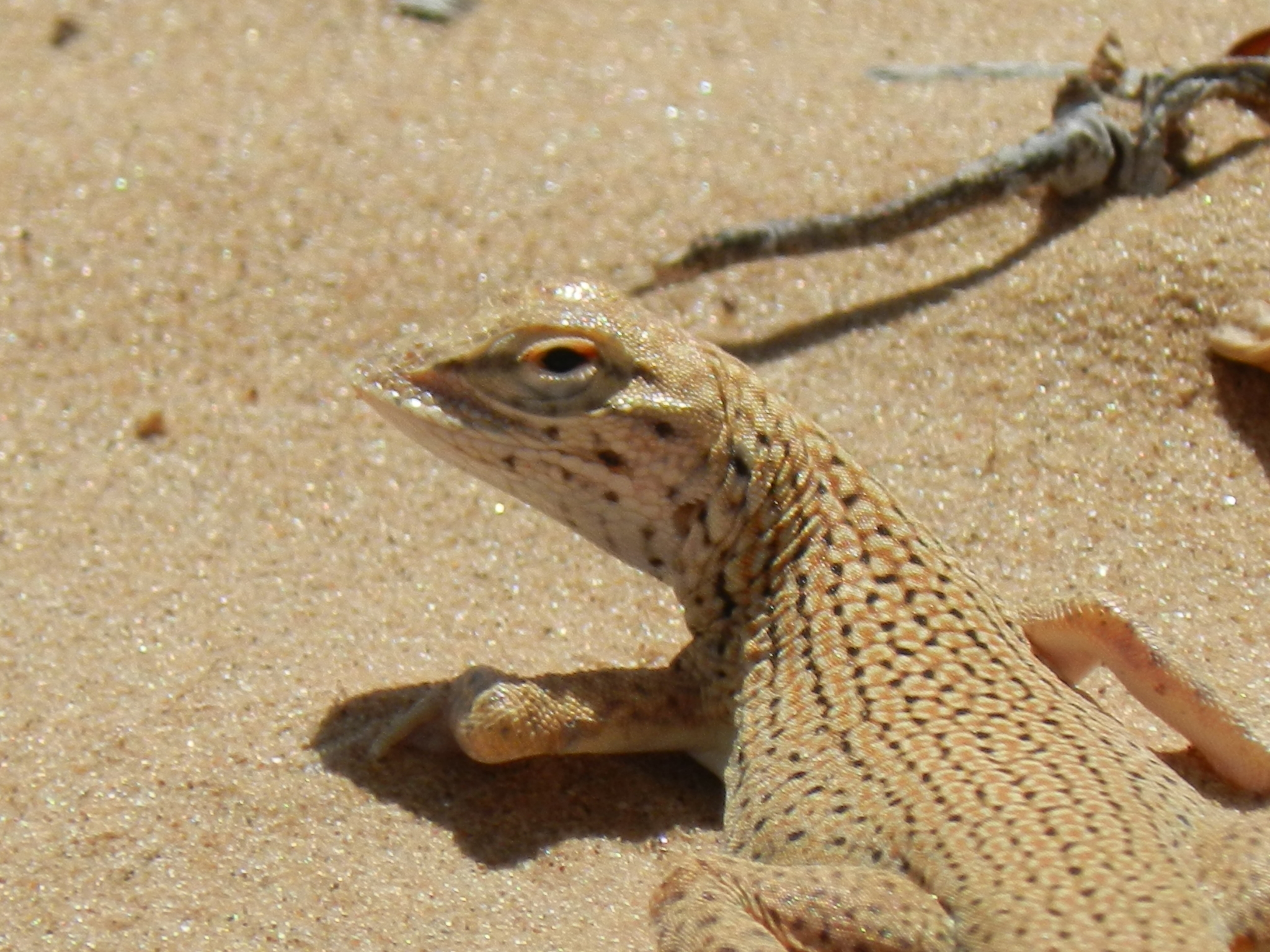
"Uma rufopunctata" in San Luis Río Colorado

This species has a confusing taxonomic history. Previously, it was referred to as Uma rufopunctata (described by Edward Drinker Cope in 1895), and was defined as ranging from the vicinity of Yuma, Arizona south to the Gran Desierto de Altar, and southeast from here through Puerto Penasco south to the Tepoca Bay. In 1941, Heifetz described Uma notata cowlesi as a new subspecies of the Colorado Desert fringe-toed lizard (Uma notata), and synonymized Uma rufopunctata with Uma notata; however, the name Uma rufopunctata was kept for this species by later sources. Finally in 2016, Gottscho et al. found Cope's rufopunctata to in fact represent a hybrid population between Uma notata and Uma cowlesi, and thus only recognized notata and cowlesi as distinct species.

== Distribution ==
This species is restricted to the Yuma Desert, where it is found in a small coastal portion of the Mexican state of Sonora. The hybrid between it and U. notata ("Uma rufopunctata") ranges further north through Sonora into southern Arizona. The Reptile Database erroneously lists it as endemic to Arizona.

== Etymology ==
The specific name, cowlesi, is in honor of American herpetologist Raymond Bridgman Cowles.
