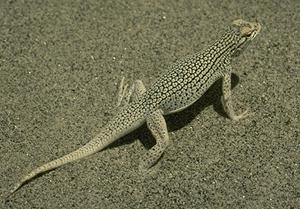

Conservation status
- Endangered (IUCN 3.1)

Scientific classification
- Kingdom: Animalia
- Phylum: Chordata
- Class: Reptilia
- Order: Squamata
- Suborder: Iguania
- Family: Phrynosomatidae
- Genus: Uma
- Species: U. inornata

Binomial name
- Uma inornata Cope, 1895
- Riverside County range map for Uma inornata, 2021, CDFW

= Coachella Valley fringe-toed lizard =

Species of phrynosomatid lizard

The Coachella Valley fringe-toed lizard (Uma inornata) is a species of phrynosomatid lizard, endemic to Riverside County, California.

== Phylogeny and evolution ==
The species is most closely related to Uma notata, the Colorado Desert fringe-toed lizard. Genetic variation within the species is small, equivalent to that of one population of Uma notata. The species population is isolated from other closely related lizards.

== Physical Description ==
Total Length: 6 to 9 inches (15–23 cm). Snout-Vent Length (SVL): Females average 8.1 cm (range 7–9.9 cm), and males average 10.2 cm (range 8–12.2 cm). Body Shape: Flattened body with a shovel-shaped head for diving into sand. Features: Elongated scales (fringes) on hind toes, specialized nostrils, and scales covering ears to navigate loose, windblown sand. Appearance: Whitish or sand-colored body (its binomial name: U. Inornata, e.g. not golden) with dark, eye-like spots (ocelli) forming shoulder stripes extending its length.

== Characteristics ==
The species is well adapted to its desert habitat and has the ability to run on its two hind feet. It has a wedged-shaped nose which enables it to burrow through loose, fine sand. Elongated scales cover the ears to keep out blowing sand, and specialized nostrils allow it to breathe below the sand without inhaling sand particles.

== Ecology, behavior, and feeding ==
During breeding season, male lizards minimize time spent foraging for food to maximize time for mating. They preferentially ate readily-available flowers rather than spending time foraging. Female lizards observed an energy-maximizing feeding strategy all year round

More specifically, in terms of feeding, the Coachella Valley fringe-toed lizard is omnivorous. Their diet consists of ants, beetles, flowers, leaves, spiders, and sometimes even their own shed skin. This, however, varies by season. During the spring, they tend to consume flowers and plant-dwelling arthropods, and during the summer, this switches to ground-dwelling arthropods and leaves. Adult males and females have different diets only during breeding season, where males consume ants and plants in the mornings, whilst females feed on ants and other insects throughout the day.

The Coachella Valley fringe-toed lizards are able to identify when there is an arthropod present underground, and dig them out of the sand to consume. They are agile and sometimes even jump to catch flowers that are too tall. Their water consumption is likely through their food.

== Habitat and distribution ==
The lizard is endemic to Coachella Valley, California. The lizard is restricted to habitats with fine, windblown sand deposits in the sandy plains of the Coachella Valley, Riverside County, California. Since the 1970s, estimates of this species' habitat has decreased by about 75% due to human activities. Only a small portion of its original habitat has wind blowing in the fine sand that creates the "blowsand" habitat that it needs to survive.

The Coachella Valley fringe-toed lizard's habitat has been negatively affected in the past 3 decades, due to increases in the human population, urban development, off-roading, and non-native invasive plants. Thus, the Coachella Valley fringe-toed lizard was declared as federally threatened and endangered in 1980.

Unfortunately, there have been severe droughts in California and the Coachella Valley. In 2002, the yearly precipitation was below 10mm. Low precipitation and frequent droughts reduce the growth of plants and food sources for the Coachella Valley fringe-toed lizard. The lack of food sources contribute to a species' survival; thus, this may be a cause for the decrease in mean reproductive productivity and decline in mean hatchling numbers and population densities.

== Conservation status ==
It is listed as an endangered species in California, a threatened species in the United States, and the IUCN classifies it as endangered.

== Refuge ==
The Coachella Valley National Wildlife Refuge, for the Coachella Valley fringe-toed lizard, is contained within the Coachella Valley Preserve, and Indio Hills Palms State Reserve, located east of Palm Springs near Palm Desert, California, in the Colorado Desert region of the Sonoran Desert.
