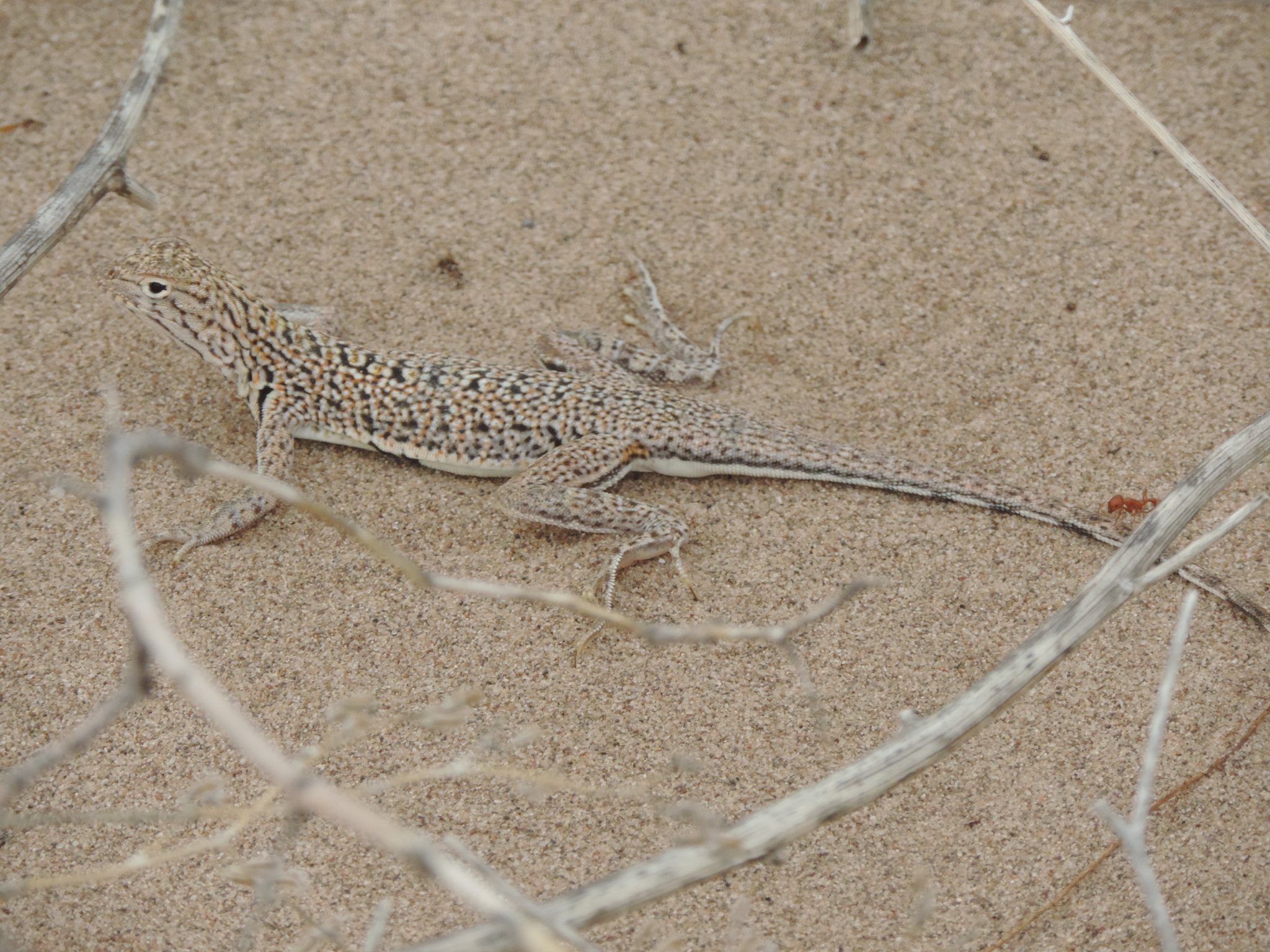

Conservation status
- Near Threatened (IUCN 3.1)

Scientific classification
- Kingdom: Animalia
- Phylum: Chordata
- Class: Reptilia
- Order: Squamata
- Suborder: Iguania
- Family: Phrynosomatidae
- Genus: Uma
- Species: U. paraphygas

Binomial name
- Uma paraphygas K.L. Williams, Chrapliwy, & H.M. Smith, 1959

= Chihuahuan fringe-toed lizard =

Species of lizard

The Chihuahuan fringe-toed lizard (Uma paraphygas) is a species of lizard in the family Phrynosomatidae. It is endemic to Mexico.
