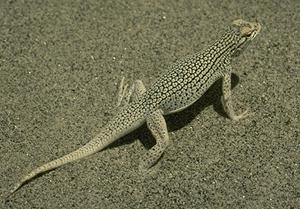
- Coachella Valley fringe-toed lizard, Uma inornata

Scientific classification
- Kingdom: Animalia
- Phylum: Chordata
- Class: Reptilia
- Order: Squamata
- Suborder: Iguania
- Family: Phrynosomatidae
- Genus: Uma; Baird, 1859

= Fringe-toed lizard =

Genus of lizards

Fringe-toed lizards are lizards of the genus Uma in the family Phrynosomatidae, native to deserts of North America. They are adapted for life in sandy deserts with fringe-like scales on their hind toes hence their common name.

== Descriptions ==
Lizards of the genus Uma have a brown and tan coloration that helps them to blend in with the sand. The dorsal surface has a velvety texture with intricate markings. In addition, they also have prominent elongated scales which form a fringe on the sides of their hind toes. These fringes aid with traction and speed, and help the lizard avoid sinking into loose, sandy dunes.

Fringe-toed lizards also possess upper jaws which overlap the lower ones, preventing the intrusion of sand particles, and nostrils that can be closed at will. Flaps also close against the ear openings when moving through sand, and the upper and lower eyelids have interlocking scales that prevent sand from getting into the eyes.

== Geographic range ==
Fringe-toed lizards range throughout southeast California and southwest Arizona, and extend into northwest Sonora and northeast Baja California.

== Habitat ==
Lizards of the genus Uma are found in low desert areas having fine, loose sand.

== Diet ==
Fringe-toed lizards primarily eat insects, including ants, beetles, grasshoppers, and caterpillars. Flower buds, stems, leaves and seeds of plants are also eaten.

== Behavior ==
Lizards of the genus Uma bury themselves underground in the winter. They sleep in their burrows, and use their burrows for protection from predators and extreme temperatures.

== Species ==
Image	Common name	Scientific name	Distribution
	Coachella Valley fringe-toed lizard	Uma inornata Cope, 1895	Coachella Valley, Riverside County, California
	Colorado Desert fringe-toed lizard	Uma notata Baird, 1858	Imperial County, California to Sonora, Mexico.
	Mohawk Dunes fringe-toed lizard	Uma thurmanae Derycke, Gottscho, Mulcahy, & De Queiroz, 2020	southern Arizona.
	Mojave fringe-toed lizard	Uma scoparia Cope, 1894	California to western Arizona
	Yuman Desert fringe-toed lizard	Uma cowlesi Heifetz, 1941	northwestern Mexico
	Chihuahuan fringe-toed lizard	Uma paraphygas K.L. Williams, Chrapliwy & H.M. Smith, 1959	Mexico.
	Fringe-toed sand lizard	Uma exsul Schmidt & Bogert, 1947	Mexico.

"Uma rufopunctata", the previous name for the Yuman Desert fringe-toed lizard, was found in 2016 to represent a hybrid between U. notata and U. cowlesi. ||

== See also ==
- Meroles, a genus of African lizards with morphological and ecological similarities
- Xerocoles, animals adapted to desert environments
