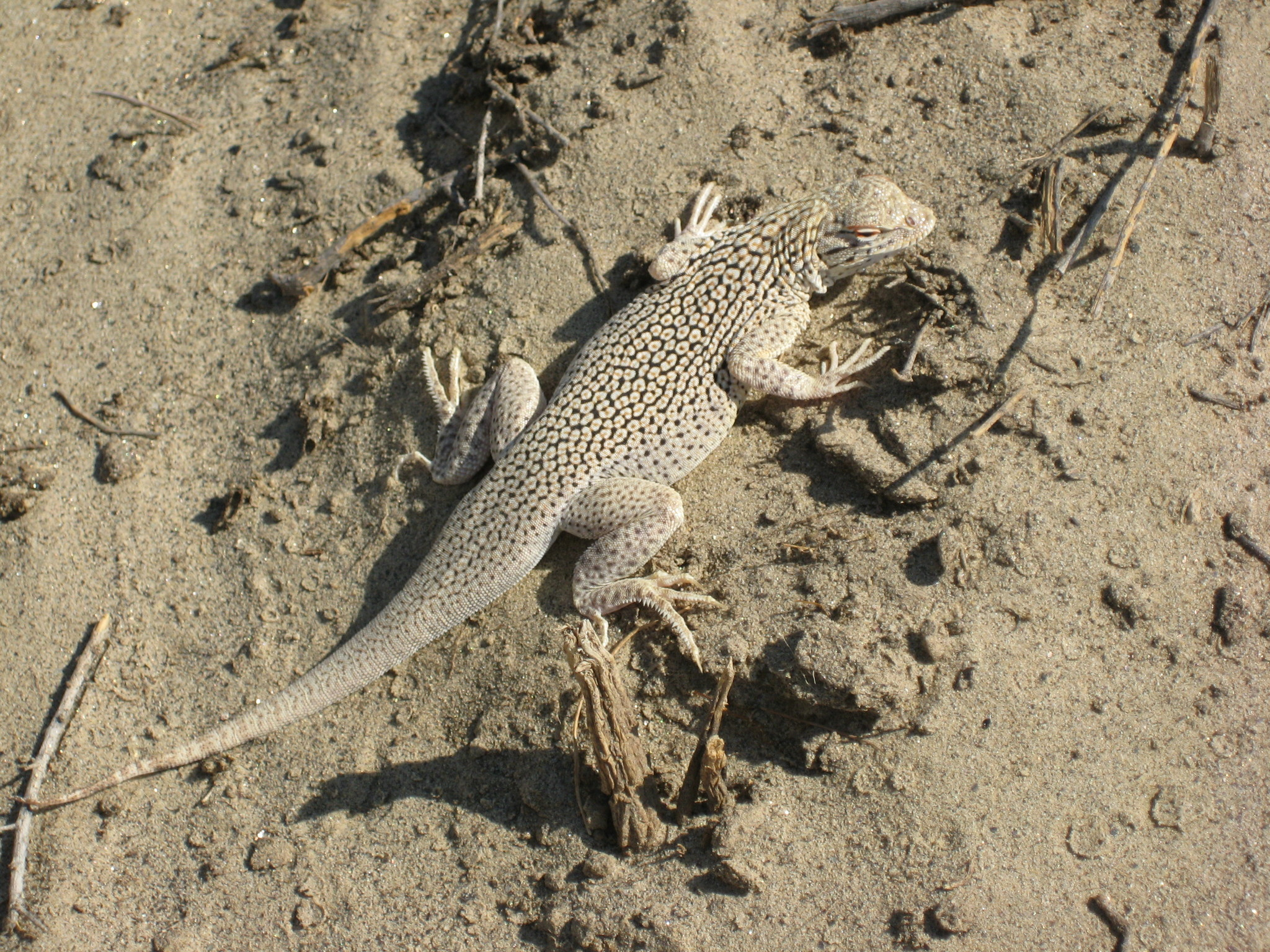

Conservation status
- Near Threatened (IUCN 3.1)

Scientific classification
- Kingdom: Animalia
- Phylum: Chordata
- Class: Reptilia
- Order: Squamata
- Suborder: Iguania
- Family: Phrynosomatidae
- Genus: Uma
- Species: U. notata

Binomial name
- Uma notata Baird, 1859

= Colorado Desert fringe-toed lizard =

Species of lizard

The Colorado Desert fringe-toed lizard (Uma notata) is a species of medium-sized, diurnal lizard in the family Phrynosomatidae. It is adapted to arid climates and is most commonly found in sand dunes within the Colorado Desert of the United States and Mexico.

It was originally described by Baird in 1859 as having a head that was two-fifths the size if the head and body, was a light pea-green spotted with darker green and with a white underside.

It can be distinguished from the Mojave fringe-toed lizard and the Coachella Valley fringe-toed lizard by its orange/pinkish stripes on the sides of its underside, while the backs have much similar appearances.

The former subspecies Uma notata rufopunctata has had an unsettled taxonomy, and in 2016 was found to represent a hybrid between Uma notata and Uma cowlesi.

== Habitat ==
The Colorado Desert fringe-toed lizard occupy the vast windblown sands of the Algodones Dunes in Imperial County, California and crossing the border into Sonora, Mexico.
