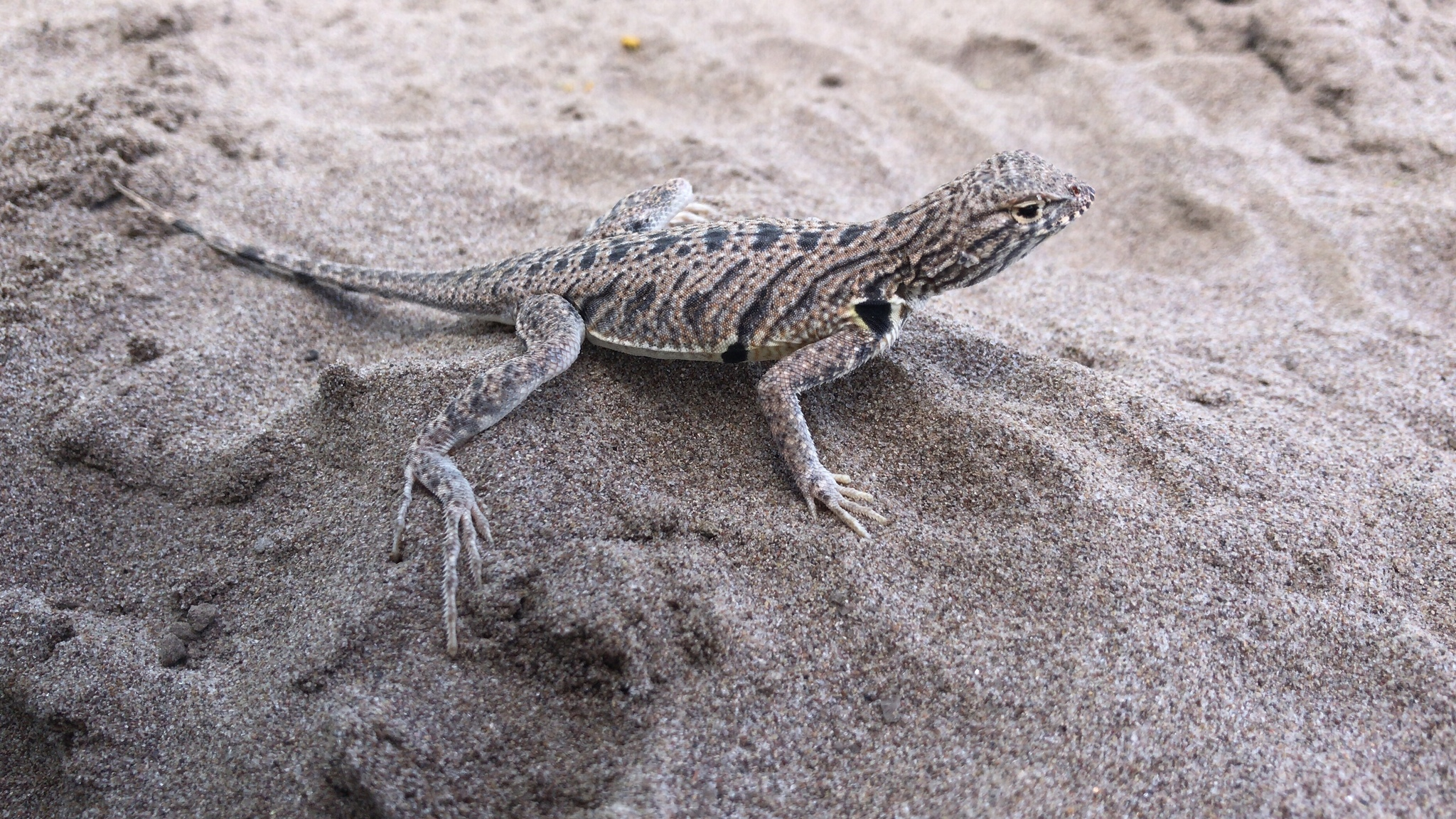

Conservation status
- Endangered (IUCN 3.1)

Scientific classification
- Kingdom: Animalia
- Phylum: Chordata
- Class: Reptilia
- Order: Squamata
- Suborder: Iguania
- Family: Phrynosomatidae
- Genus: Uma
- Species: U. exsul

Binomial name
- Uma exsul Schmidt & Bogert, 1947

= Fringe-toed sand lizard =

Species of lizard

The fringe-toed sand lizard (Uma exsul) is a species of lizard in the family Phrynosomatidae. It is endemic to Mexico. It is omnivorous, with the ability to detect food chemically by tongue-flicking.
