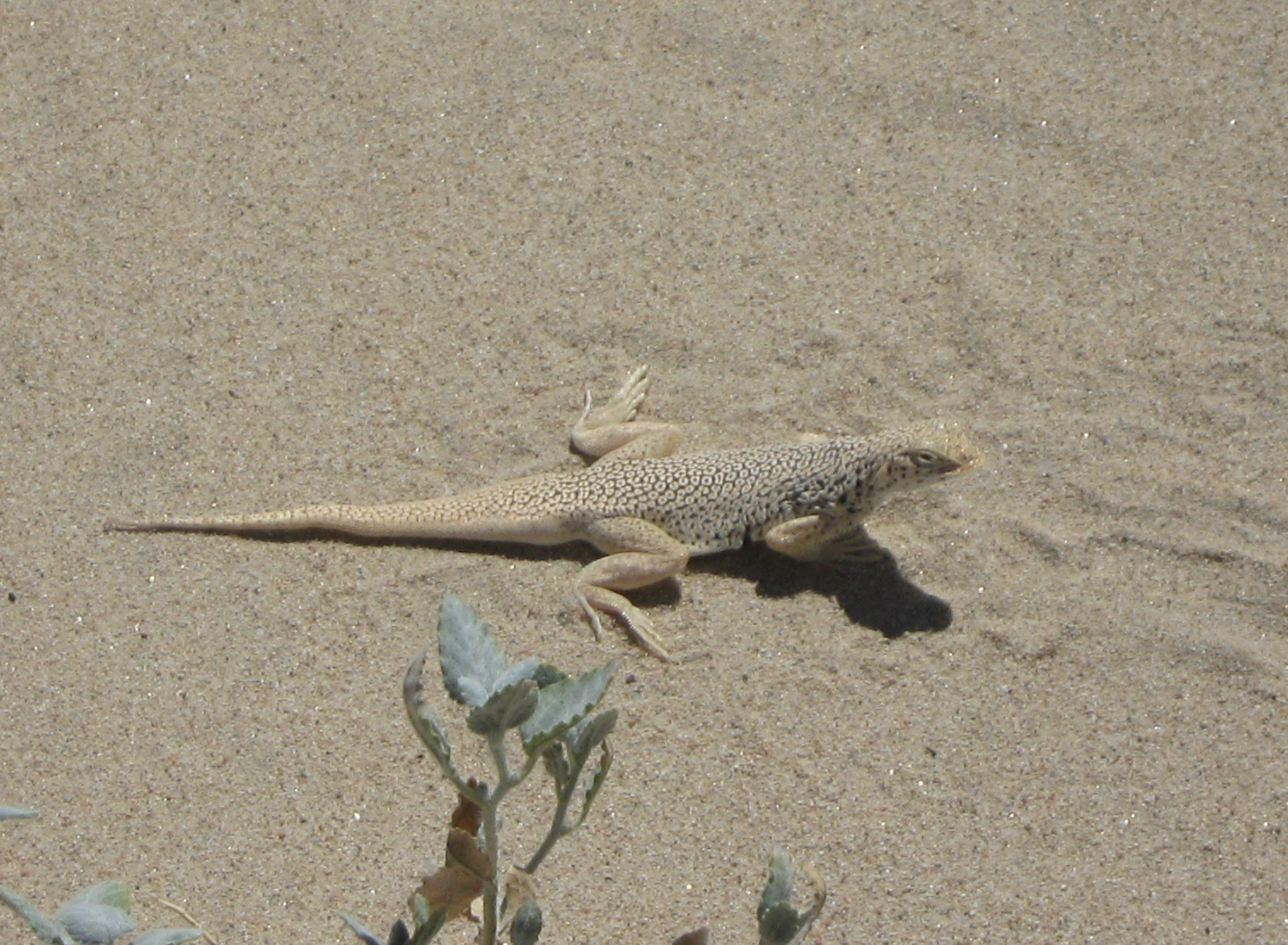

Conservation status
- Least Concern (IUCN 3.1)

Scientific classification
- Kingdom: Animalia
- Phylum: Chordata
- Order: Squamata
- Suborder: Iguania
- Family: Phrynosomatidae
- Genus: Uma
- Species: U. scoparia

Binomial name
- Uma scoparia Cope, 1894

= Mojave fringe-toed lizard =

Species of lizard

The Mojave fringe-toed lizard (Uma scoparia) is a species of medium-sized, white or grayish, black-spotted diurnal lizard in the family Phrynosomatidae. It is adapted to arid climates and is most commonly found in sand dunes within the Mojave Desert. Fringe-toed lizards are characterized by their fringed scales on their hind toes which make locomotion in loose sand possible.

== Description ==
The Mojave fringe-toed lizard is a flat-bodied lizard with smooth skin. Like other members of the Uma genus, they also have prominent elongated scales which form a fringe on the sides of their hind toes..

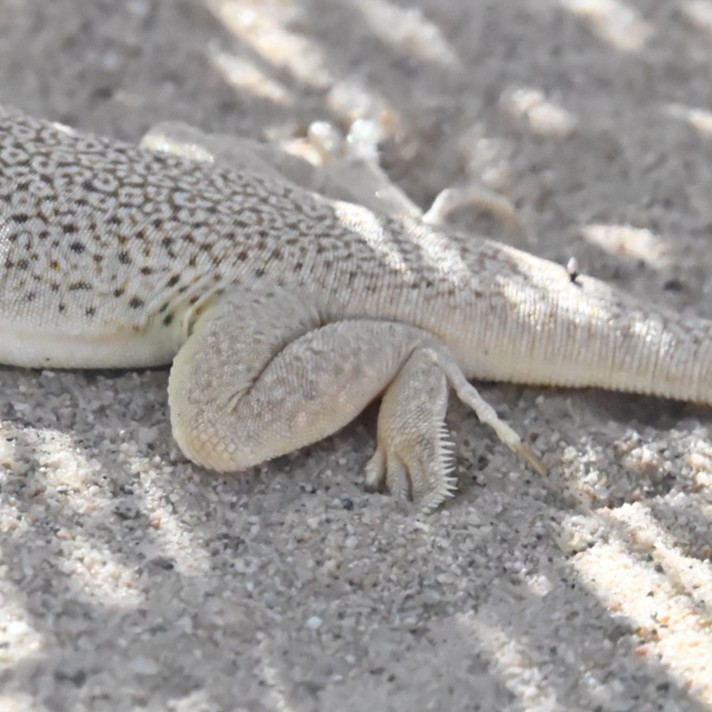
Mojave fringe-toed lizard hind foot with prominent fringes.

The color of its skin resembles the environment it inhabits, ranging from a tannish white to a grayish white, and likely contains small black spots along its back. On its underside, there are up to three crescent-shaped throat markings which are characteristic of the Mojave fringe-toed lizard. Also characteristic of this species are the dark bands on its tail and dark blotches on the sides of its belly. During breeding season, the dark spots on its belly-sides turn pink, and its underside turns pale-yellow. The length of this lizard's tail matches the length of its body, with the whole organism reaching lengths of around 7 inches long.

The males are protective of their territory, as they walk the perimeter of their of their home and exhibit assertion displays. These displays are associated with reproduction rather than resource protection. Females are not seen to protect their territory, but rather exhibit territoriality over a specific site.

== Life cycle ==
The adult form typically hibernates from November to February by burying itself around a foot below the sand. Juveniles hibernate much closer to the surface, but some don't hibernate at all and are active throughout the whole year. During March and April, this species of lizard is active for fewer hours in comparison to its close Uma relatives due to the cooler temperature of the Mojave desert.

The Mojave fringe-toed lizard reaches sexual maturity during its second year, and its mating season is around late spring. The amount of rainfall influences the breeding capacity of the lizard, and females typically lay 1-5 eggs per mating season with an average of 2-3 eggs, hatching in September. There is no seasonal migration in this species. The lizards likely bury their eggs in the sand similar to other lizard species. More young are produced after wet winters, likely due to the abundance of spring annual plants and insects.

== Diet ==
The lizard primarily feeds on invertebrates which live near the surface such as ants, beetles, scorpions, hemipterans, spiders, antlion larvae, and grasshoppers. They are also seen to eat plant matter such as seeds, leaves, flowers, and grasses. As annual plants become less common during the summer months, their diet shifts from primarily herbivorous to insectivorous. Occasionally, they have been observed to eat smaller lizards of different species as well as smaller conspecifics. During mating season, there are differences of behavior in regards to eating. Males have been observed to eat plants and insects during the morning only, while females and juveniles have been observed to eat these at all points in the day.

== Geographic range ==
The Mojave fringe-toed lizard's range extends from Inyo County, Los Angeles County, Riverside County, and San Bernardino County in California to western Arizona in La Paz County. Most are restricted to areas which have fine sand, dry lake beds, desert washes, and hillsides. The elevational range of their habitat is from sea level up to 3000 ft.

== Threats ==
The Mojave fringe-toed lizard has a number of predators in its environment, consisting of roadrunners, badgers, loggerhead shrikes, coyotes, and various snakes. As these lizards are camouflaged within their surroundings or hidden beneath the surface, many have been killed due to off-roading recreational vehicles. These vehicles also damage the shrubbery which act as a source of food and protection for the lizards. Off-roading has tripled in dune areas since 1999, leading to increased lizard casualties and the decline of their population. Habitat loss can also be attributed to increased toxins from military operations, urban development, air pollution, and global warming.

== See also ==
- Dumont Dunes
