= Coachella Valley Preserve =

Protected area in California, United States

- IUCN category V (protected landscape/seascape)
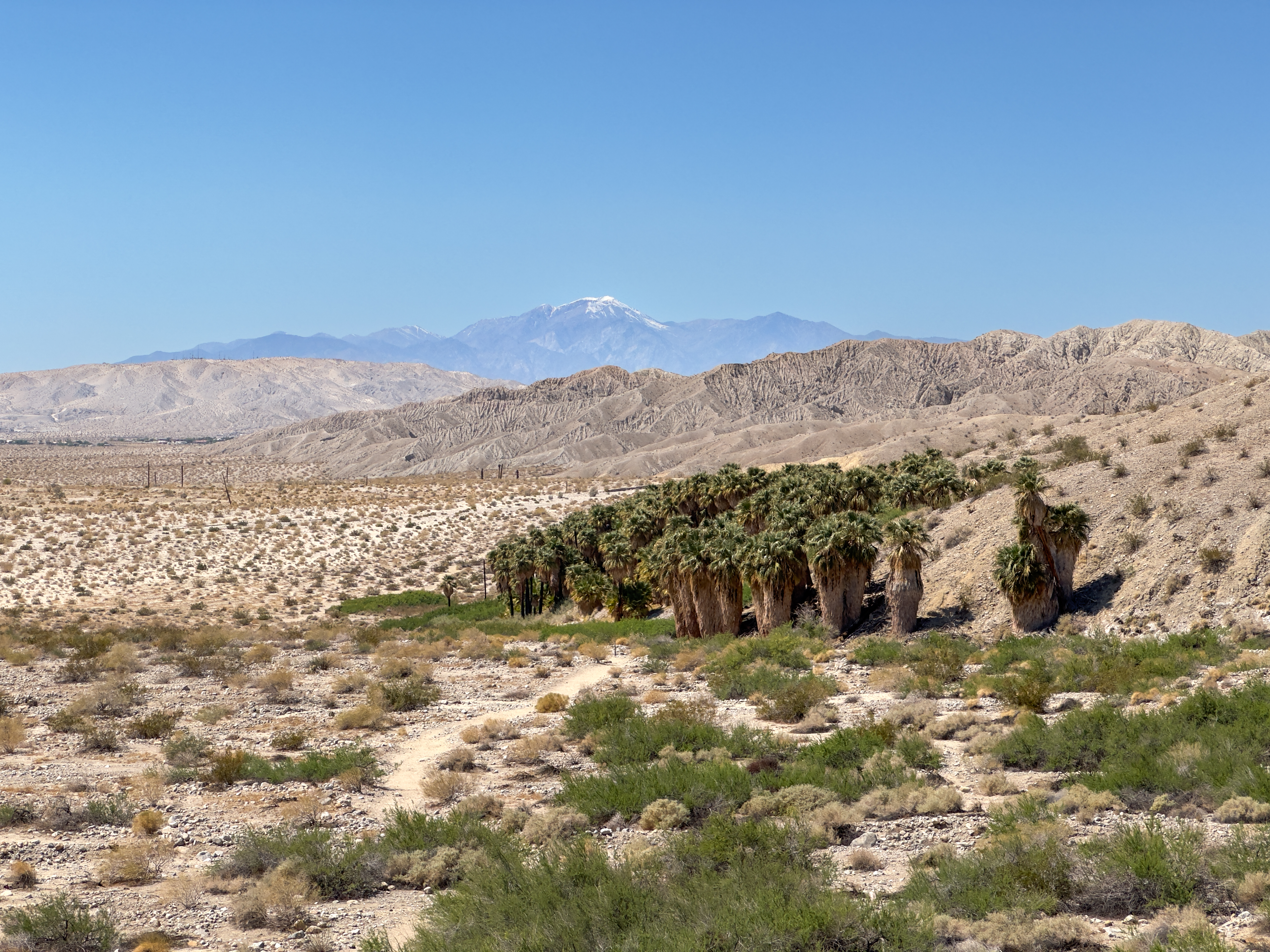
- Indio Hills, a California Fan Palm oasis, and San Gorgonio Mountain

- Location within the United States
- Location: Riverside County, California, United States
- Nearest city: Palm Desert, California
- Coordinates: 33.831205°N 116.309518°W
- Governing body: U.S. Bureau of Land Management
- Website: Coachella Valley Preserve

The Coachella Valley Preserve is a protected area in the Coachella Valley located east of Palm Springs near Palm Desert, California. It protects parts of the Indio Hills and its surrounding areas. It contains the Coachella Valley National Wildlife Refuge, the Indio Hills Palms Park Property, and the Thousand Palms Oasis Preserve. All are in the Colorado Desert section of the Sonoran Desert and adjacent to the Lower Colorado River Valley region.

== Management ==
The Coachella Valley Preserve, a 2,206-acre (8.93 km^{2}) area, is maintained by the non-profit Nature Conservancy. The Indio Hills Palms Park Property is managed by the California Department of Parks and Recreation.

== California Fan Palm oasis ==
The area is one of the few in the desert with an oasis fed by natural springs that supports the only California native palm, the Washingtonia filifera, or California Fan Palm. The San Andreas Fault, visible from the valley floor as a line of greenery along the base of the hills, captures groundwater that nurtures the palms. The 1,000 Palms Oasis grove is easily reached by foot from the trailhead.

== Desert pupfish ==
Naturally occurring artesian ponds provide habitat for the Desert pupfish, a small, endangered species of freshwater fish - roughly the size of a young goldfish. These ponds are part of the self-guided tour among the California Fan Palm groves.

== Coachella Valley Fringe-toed Lizard ==
The Coachella Valley National Wildlife Refuge is a restricted access habitat for the Coachella Valley Fringe-toed Lizard, listed as an endangered species in California, a threatened species in the United States and the IUCN classifies it as endangered.

== See also ==
- Category:Geography of the Colorado Desert
- Category:Fauna of the Colorado Desert
- List of Sonoran Desert wildflowers
