= Lorus Milne =

Canadian-American biologist and writer

- Born: Lorus Johnson Milne; September 12, 1910; York, Ontario, Canada
- Died: May 4, 1987 (aged 76); Dover, New Hampshire, U.S.
- Occupations: Biologist, ecology expert, science writer, teacher
- Known for: Science writing, education, conservation and research
- Notable work: The Biotic Man and World; A Multitude of Living Things; The Senses of Animals and Men
- Spouse: Margery Milne
- Awards: AAAS Award Honorable Mention 1947; Young Entomologist Society Award; 1993 Best Children's Book

Lorus Johnson Milne (September 12, 1910 – May 4, 1987) was a Canadian and American biologist, naturalist, conservationist, professor, and author. He co-wrote over fifty books, and over one hundred articles in the field of natural science alongside his wife, Margery Milne. His works appeared in Science, The New York Times, Scientific American, and The Atlantic Monthly.

Milne expressed his philosophy as the following: “The unifying joy in my life stems from discoveries, both personal and the observation of others, about the ongoing interaction among all kinds of life… A reverence for life and a delight in learning about plants and animals, I find, opens the way to friendly communication with people of all nations, regardless of language, education, or economic status.”

== Early life ==
Milne was born in York (later Toronto), Canada, to Charles Milne and Edna Johnson. Raised in a rural area, he developed a love of nature since childhood. He was fascinated the most by insects and collected them on his grandparents’ farm. With time, he learned entomological techniques and compiled a collection for which he won first place in the Canadian Natural Exhibition in 1925, when he was fifteen years old. As a result, he was offered a job at the National Museum of Canada, but because of his young age the offer was postponed. Milne helped out in the museum during the summer and later as a student at the University of Toronto.

== Education ==
In 1929, Milne entered the University of Toronto to pursue a Bachelor’s degree in biology. During his time at the University, he specialized in Trichoptera, an order of insects also known as caddisfly, and worked as a part-time assistant curator at the Royal Ontario Museum to support himself financially.

In 1933, he graduated with highest honors and received a scholarship to attend Harvard University. At Harvard he wrote and self-published his major contribution to Trichopterology, Studies in North American Trichoptera, which provided deep understanding of the entire caddisfly fauna of the United States and Canada known at the time. He also chose unusual names for species, such as Pycnopsyche sonso and 22 species of Rhyacophila with adjectives beginning with v’s.

Milne received both a M.A. (1934) and a PhD (1936) from Harvard.

== Career ==
After leaving Harvard, Milne broadened his interests from caddisfly taxonomy to the whole field of biology and worked at six universities.

In 1936, he became a professor of biology and geology at Southwestern University in Texas. He moved to Virginia in 1939 and started teaching at Randolph-Macon Woman's College before accepting a position at the University of Pennsylvania to teach and research in the field of Medical Physics. There, he got interested in the human visual problems and in animals’ color and in black and white vision. He collaborated with Nobel Prize winner Haldan Keffer Hartline on aviation medicine in the War Research Division, Johnson Foundation of Medical Physics.

After the Second World War, in 1947, Milne was hired by the University of Vermont, but then he accepted a position at the University of New Hampshire. In 1948, he started teaching zoology at UNH, where he worked for over 28 years and where he was formed as a naturalist writer and lecturer. For his merits, he was elected president of the UNH Honor’s Society Sigma Xi and chairman of the biology program.

== Awards ==
Milne earned a large number of scholarly awards and research travel grants together with his wife Margery. Among the first achievements was Ford Fellowship to South America.

In 1947, the Milnes received an honorable mention from the American Association for the Advancement of Science for the article Life of the Water Film.

In 1951, the Milnes conducted research at the Barro Colorado Island biological sanctuary in Panama through a grant from the Smithsonian Institution. After that they published several scientific papers and made a film called Panama Venture.

Following the release of the significant textbook The Biotic World and Man(1952), the Milnes were awarded a research grant by the United Nations Education Council, later UNESCO, which allowed them to conduct fieldwork in Australia and New Zealand.

In 1960, the Milnes participated in the United States–South Africa Leader Exchange Program which promoted the exchange of experience between different professionals of these countries.

After the publication of Water and Life in 1964, the Milnes were awarded a research grant by the National Geographic Society which allowed them to go to Israel, Tunisia, Libya, and Kuwait, where they studied the importance of fresh water.

The book Nature's Great Carbon Cycle was noted with an honorable mention by the Cooperative Children's Book Center in 1983.

In the 1980s, the Milnes traveled to the Soviet Union to investigate the aftermath of the 1986 nuclear disaster and its long-term consequences. Based on their research, they wrote a book for young adults Understanding Radioactivity, which was published in 1989.

== Legacy ==
=== Insect collection ===
Throughout his life, Milne collected various caddisflies out of professional interest. Most of his personal collection, including types, was given to the Illinois Natural History Survey in Champaign, Illinois. Some of the caddisfly types that Milne amassed are at the Museum of Comparative Zoology, Harvard University. He donated much of his big collection that contained over 13,000 specimens, to the University of New Hampshire.

=== Milne Nature Sanctuary ===
In 1961, Milne and his wife purchased 1.5 acres of land in Durham, New Hampshire, on Mill Pond. Their goal was to save the place in its natural state. Soon after, swans began settling on the pond and returning each year to raise a family. The Milnes maintained the land and protected the swans as part of their conservation work. In 1968, the town council appointed them as "Durham's Keepers of the Swans". After the couple's death, the land was designated a nature sanctuary and deeded to the town of Durham. In 2009, a commemorative bench and stone were placed to honor their legacy.

=== Scholarships ===
Multiple scholarship programs and research awards have been created in the names of Lorus Milne and his wife. The University of New Hampshire offers the Drs. Lorus & Margery Milne Memorial Scholarship to students in the biological sciences. In 2008, the University of Toronto established the Milne Research Award, granted to outstanding undergraduate students. The Marine Biological Laboratory at the University of Chicago has the Lorus J. and Margery J. Milne Scholarship, aimed at supporting student research.

== Publications ==
Milne co-authored over fifty five books, including textbooks and children’s literature, and more than one hundred scientific articles, book reviews, and magazine pieces.

=== Books ===
Title	Publisher	Year
A Multitude of Living Things	Dodd, Mead & Co.	1947
The Mating Instinct	Little, Brown & Co.	1954
The World of Night	Harper Books	1956
Paths Across the Earth	First Edition, Harper	1958
The Balance of Nature	Knopf	1960
The Lower Animals: Living Invertebrates of the World	DoubleDay	1960
The Mountains	Time-Life Books	1962
The Senses of Animal and Man	Atheneum	1962
The Valley: Meadow, Grove, and Stream	Harper	1963
Water and Life	Atheneum	1964
Living Plants of the World	Random House	1967
The Ages of Life: A New Look at the Effects of Time on Mankind and Other Living Things	Harcourt	1968
The Nature of Life: Earth, Plants, Animals, Man, and Their Effect on Each Other	Crown	1970
The Arena of Life: The Dynamics of Ecology	Doubleday	1972
The Animal in Man	McGraw-Hill	1973
The Secret Life of Animals	Weidenfeld and Nicolson	1976
Ecology Out of Joint: New Environments and Why They Happen	Scribner Book Company	1977
National Audubon Society Field Guide to Insects and Spiders: North America	Knopf	1980
Insect Worlds: A Guide for Man on Making the Most of the Environment	Scribner Book Company	1980
Dreams of a Perfect Earth	Atheneum	1982
World Alive: The Natural Wonders of a New England River Valley	Yankee Books	1991
Nature's Clean Up Crew	Dodd, Mead & Co.	1982

=== Textbooks ===
Title	Publisher	Year
The Biotic World and Man	Prentice-Hall	1952
Animal Life	Prentice-Hall	1959
Plant Life	Prentice-Hall	1959
Patterns of Survival	Prentice-Hall	1967
North American Birds	Prentice-Hall	1969
The Cougar Doesn't Live Here Any More: Does the World Still Have Room for Wildlife?	Prentice-Hall	1971

=== Scientific articles ===
Notes on Silphidae in Haliburton Co., Ontario	1928
The Arctopsychidae of continental America north of Mexico	1938
A new species of Rhyacophila, described from metamorpho-types (Rhyacophilidae; Trichoptera)	1940
Autecology of the Golden-Rod Gall Fly	1940
Caddis Flies (Trichoptera) and Pitcher Plants	1944
Notes on the Behavior of Burying Beetles (Nicrophorus spp.)	1944
Notes on the Behavior of the Ghost Crab	1946
Insect Vision	1948
The Life of the Water Film	1948
Temperature and Life	1949
Right Hand, Left Hand	1948
Notes on the Behavior of Horned Toads	1950
Animal Courtship	1950
The Eelgrass Catastrophe	1951
The Quantum and Life	1951
Study of invertebrate photo- receptors-anatomy and physiology, including role in normal living habits	1952
How Animals Change Colors	1952
Electrical Events in Vision	1956
What do Animals See?	1958
Stabilization of the Visual Field	1965
Insects of the Water Surface	1978

== Personal life ==
Milne married biologist Margery Joan Greene on September 10, 1936, two years after they met at the Marine Biological Laboratory at Woods Hole, Massachusetts. The couple shared passion for natural world and education and soon started traveling and researching as a team. They collaborated on most of their publications and some of the lectures. Photography of the wildlife played a big role in their work as well. In 1948, they moved to Durham, New Hampshire, and lived out their lives.

== Death ==
Milne died on May 4, 1987, after a sudden illness, at the age of seventy-six in Dover, New Hampshire.
