= Margery Milne =

American Biologist and Writer

- Born: Margery Joan Greene Milne; January 18, 1914; Bronx, New York, U.S.
- Died: February 28, 2006 (aged 92); Durham, New Hampshire
- Occupations: Biologist, Ecologist, Science Writer
- Known for: Science writing, Education, Conservation and Research
- Notable work: The Biotic Man and World; A Multitude of Living Things; The Senses of Animals and Men
- Awards: AAAS Award Honorable Mention 1947 Young Entomologist Society Award 1993 Best Children's Book

Margery Joan Greene Milne (January 18, 1914 – February 28, 2006) was an internationally recognized American biologist, ecologist, conservationist, and science writer. She co-authored, alongside her husband, more than fifty books, including numerous works for children, and published over one hundred scientific articles. Her writing appeared in publications such as National Geographic Magazine, The New York Times, and The Atlantic Monthly. Throughout her career, Milne was committed to promoting public understanding of the natural world, using her scientific knowledge to engage audiences through accessible storytelling.

== Early life ==
Born to Samuel Greenburg and Rebecca Gutman, Margery was raised in the Bronx, New York City where her close proximity to the Bronx Zoo fostered an early interest in science and the natural world. This formative exposure played a key role in shaping her lifelong dedication to scientific education and communication. She attended Wadleigh High School, an all-girls public school in New York City.

== Education ==
Her passion for science, combined with her dream of being published in The New York Times, inspired her to pursue a bachelor's degree in biology at Hunter College, a women's college in New York City. She graduated in 1933.

During her time at Hunter College, she was elected president of the Honors Biology Society and received a full-tuition scholarship. She then pursued her graduate studies at Columbia University, earning a Master of Arts in 1934 with highest honors, specializing in microscopic organisms and marine biology. During her graduate studies, she conducted research at the Woods Hole Oceanographic Institution in Cape Cod, Massachusetts where she was one of only two women in the program.

Milne received a fellowship from Radcliffe College in Cambridge Massachusetts, a women's college later incorporated into Harvard University, and earned her M.A. in 1936 and her Ph.D. in 1939. She was awarded the Phi Beta Kappa Key for academic excellence and was elected a member of the Phi Beta Kappa Honor Society.

== Career ==
Milne began her professional career as a biology teacher at Theodore Roosevelt High School in New York City. She was appointed faculty at the University of Maine, before she joined the faculty at Beaver College, now Arcadia University, in Pennsylvania. In 1948, she was appointed as an assistant professor at the University of New Hampshire, where she worked for three years before having to resign due to an anti-nepotism policy. After UNH, Milne continued her research, teaching, and travels and worked as a professor at the University of New Hampshire at Manchester, Granite State College, Northeastern University and Fitchburg State University.

== Publications ==
Milne co-authored over fifty books and published more than one hundred scientific articles, book reviews, and magazine features throughout her career.

=== Books ===
Books co-authored by Milne
Title	Publisher	Year of publication
A Multitude of Living Things	Dodd, Mead & Co.	1947
The Mating Instinct	Little, Brown & Co	1954
The World of Night	Harper Books	1956
Paths Across the Earth	First Edition, Harper	1958
The Balance of Nature	Knopf	1960
The Lower Animals: Living Invertebrates of the World	DoubleDay	1960
The Mountains	Time-Life Books	1962
The Senses of Animal and Men	Atheneum	1962
The Valley: Meadow, Grove, and Stream	Harper	1963
Water and Life	Atheneum	1964
Living Plants of the World	Random House	1967
The Ages of Life: A New Look at the Effects of Time on Mankind and Other Living Things	Harcourt	1968
The Nature of Life: Earth, Plants, Animals, Man, and Their Effect on Each Other	Crown	1970
The Arena of Life: The Dynamics of Ecology	DoubleDay	1972
The Animal in Man	McGraw-Hill	1973
The Secret Life of Animals	Weidenfeld and Nicolson	1976
Ecology out of Joint: New Environments and Why They Happen	Scribner Book Company	1977
National Audubon Society Field Guide to Insects and Spiders: North America	Knopf	1980
Insect Worlds: A Guide for Man on Making the most of the Environment	Scribner Book Company	1980
Dreams of a Perfect Earth	Atheneum	1982
World Alive: The Natural Wonders of a New England River Valley	Yankee Books	1991
Nature's Clean Up Crew	Dodd, Mead & Co.	1982

=== Textbooks ===
Textbooks co-authored by Milne
Title	Publisher	Year of publication
The Biotic World and Man	Prentice-Hall	1952
Animal Life	Prentice-Hall	1959
Plant Life	Prentice-Hall	1959
Patterns of Survival	Prentice-Hall	1967
North American Birds	Prentice-Hall	1969
The Cougar Doesn't Live Here Any More: Does the World Still Have Room for Wildlife?	Prentice-Hall	1971

=== Scientific articles ===
Scientific articles co-authored by Milne
Title	Year of publication
Notes on Silphidae in Haliburton Co., Ontario.	1928
The Arctopsychidae of continental America north of Mexico	1938
A new species of Rhyacophila, described from metamorpho-types (Rhyacophilidae; Trichoptera).	1940
Autecology of the Golden-Rod Gall Fly	1940
Caddis Flies (Trichoptera) and Pitcher Plants	1944
Notes on the Behavior of Burying Beetles (Nicrophorus spp.)	1944
Notes on the Behavior of the Ghost Crab	1946
Insect Vision	1948
The Life of the Water Film	1948
Temperature and Life	1949
Right Hand, Left Hand	1948
Notes on the Behavior of Horned Toads	1950
Animal Courtship	1950
The Eelgrass Catastrophe	1951
The Quantum and Life	1951
Study of invertebrate photo- receptors-anatomy and physiology, including role in normal living habits	1952
How Animals Change Colors	1952
Electrical Events in Vision	1956
What do Animals See?	1958
Stabilization of the Visual Field	1965
Insects of the Water Surface	1978

== Research grants and awards ==
Throughout her career, Milne and her husband were recipients of multiple awards and research travel grants. In 1951, the Milnes conducted research at the Barro Colorado Island biological sanctuary in Panama through a grant from the Smithsonian Institution, leading to the publication of several scientific papers, and a film "Panama Venture".

Following the release of the influential textbook The Biotic World and Man (1952), the Milnes were awarded a research grant by the United Nations Education Council—now known as UNESCO—which enabled them to conduct fieldwork in Australia and New Zealand.

In 1960, the Milnes participated in the United States–South Africa Leader Exchange Program. After the publication of "Water and Life" in 1964, the Milnes were awarded a research grant by the National Geographic Society which took them to Israel, Tunisia, Libya, and Kuwait, where they studied environmental conditions and water scarcity.

In the 1980s, the Milnes traveled to the Soviet Union to investigate the aftermath of the 1986 Chernobyl disaster and its long-term consequences. Following this trip, they wrote a book for young adults Understanding Radioactivity, published in 1989.

=== Awards ===
In 1947, Milne received an honorable mention from the American Association for the Advancement of Science for "Life of the Water Film."

The book Nature's Great Carbon Cycle was recognized with an honorable mention by the Cooperative Children's Book Center in 1983.

== Legacy ==
=== Milne Nature Sanctuary ===
In 1961, Milne and her husband purchased 1.5 acres of land in Durham, New Hampshire that had been rezoned for residential use. They chose to preserve it as a place for reflection and nature contemplation. Over time, swans began nesting on the property and returned each year to raise their young. The Milnes maintained the land and protected the swans as part of their conservation efforts. In 1968, the town council appointed them as "Durham's Keepers of the Swans." After Milne's death, the land was designated a nature sanctuary and deeded to the city of Durham. In 2009, a commemorative bench and stone were placed to honor their legacy.

=== Scholarships ===
Several scholarships and research awards have been established in honor of Margery Milne and her husband, recognizing their contributions to science and education. The University of New Hampshire offers scholarship support to students in the Biological Sciences in their name. In 2008, the University of Toronto established the Milne Research Award, granted to outstanding undergraduate researchers. The Marine Biological Laboratory at the University of Chicago maintains an endowed scholarship supporting student research, the Lorus J. and Margery J. Milne Scholarship.

== Personal life ==
Milne married Lorus Johnson Milne, a PhD student from Harvard University, in September 1936. The couple collaborated on most of their publications. They researched and traveled together, sharing their passion for science and the natural world. They lived in Virginia, Pennsylvania, and in 1948 they moved to Durham, NH and lived out their lives. After Lorus Milne died in 1987 at age seventy-six, Margery Milne continued writing, teaching, and traveling on her own.

Milne died on February 28, 2006, at 94 years old in Durham, NH.
