= Coachella Valley National Wildlife Refuge =

Protected area located near Palm Desert, California

- IUCN category IV (habitat/species management area)
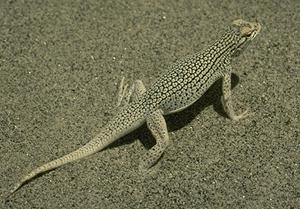
- Coachella Valley Fringe-toed Lizard

- Location within the United States
- Location: Riverside County, California, United States
- Nearest city: Palm Desert, California
- Coordinates: 33.7983°N 116.3186°W
- Area: 3,709 acres (15.01 km^{2})
- Established: 1985
- Governing body: U.S. Fish and Wildlife Service
- Website: Coachella Valley National Wildlife Refuge

Coachella Valley National Wildlife Refuge is a 3,709-acre (15.01 km^{2}) protected area in Riverside County, California's Coachella Valley. It lies within the unincorporated community of Thousand Palms, just north of Palm Desert. The refuge contains the majority of critical habitat for the Coachella Valley Fringe-toed Lizard (Uma inornata) within the Coachella Valley Preserve.

== Refuge habitat ==
The habitat of this threatened species is restricted to the refuge's dune system and a few other small areas. This dune system is in jeopardy as development threatens sand sources and the Coachella Valley fringe-toed lizard's travel corridors.

== Access ==
The refuge, managed by the United States Fish and Wildlife Service, provides for the only significant habitat acreage that is not available for multiple recreating uses by the public. The Coachella Valley Refuge is almost entirely closed to the public to protect the federally listed threatened Coachella Valley Fringe-toed Lizard. However, there is a trail that runs through a section of the refuge available for horseback riders.

== See also ==
- List of Sonoran Desert wildflowers
