= Sceloporus dixoni =

Scientific classification
- Domain: Eukaryota
- Kingdom: Animalia
- Phylum: Chordata
- Class: Reptilia
- Order: Squamata
- Suborder: Iguania
- Family: Phrynosomatidae
- Genus: Sceloporus
- Species: S. dixoni

Binomial name
- Sceloporus dixoni Bryson & Grummer, 2021 in Bryson et al., 2021

Species of lizard

Sceloporus dixoni is a species of lizard in the family Phrynosomatidae. It was split from Sceloporus subniger in 2021. It is endemic to the western half of the Trans-Mexican Volcanic Belt between Morelia, Michoacán, and the lower slopes of the Nevado de Colima in Jalisco. It is named in honor of James R. Dixon who worked extensively on Mexican herpetofauna.

A relatively small species compared to its nearest relatives, Sceloporus dixoni can grow to 54 mm (2.1 in) in snout–vent length.
