= Sceloporus huichol =

Scientific classification
- Kingdom: Animalia
- Phylum: Chordata
- Class: Reptilia
- Order: Squamata
- Suborder: Iguania
- Family: Phrynosomatidae
- Genus: Sceloporus
- Species: S. huichol

Binomial name
- Sceloporus huichol Flores-Villela, Smith, Campillo-Garcia, Martinez-Mendez, & Campbell, 2022

Species of lizard

Sceloporus huichol is a species of lizard in the family Phrynosomatidae. It is endemic to Mexico, and can specifically be found in the mountainous regions of Jalisco and Nayarit. Sceloporus huichol belongs to the species group torquatus. Phylogenetically, Sceloporus huichol is closely related to Sceloporus melanogaster.
