= Sceloporus hesperus =

Scientific classification
- Domain: Eukaryota
- Kingdom: Animalia
- Phylum: Chordata
- Class: Reptilia
- Order: Squamata
- Suborder: Iguania
- Family: Phrynosomatidae
- Genus: Sceloporus
- Species: S. hesperus

Binomial name
- Sceloporus hesperus Bryson & Grummer, 2021 in Bryson et al., 2021

Species of lizard

Sceloporus hesperus is a species of lizard in the family Phrynosomatidae. It was split from Sceloporus subniger in 2021. It is endemic to Sierra de Mascota in Jalisco, in the far western end of the Trans-Mexican Volcanic Belt. The specific name hesperus, from the Greek hesperos meaning "western", refers to this aspects its distribution.

A small species compared to its nearest relatives, Sceloporus hesperus can grow to 47 mm (1.9 in) in snout–vent length.
