= Sceloporus halli =

Conservation status
- Data Deficient (IUCN 3.1)

Scientific classification
- Kingdom: Animalia
- Phylum: Chordata
- Class: Reptilia
- Order: Squamata
- Suborder: Iguania
- Family: Phrynosomatidae
- Genus: Sceloporus
- Species: S. halli

Binomial name
- Sceloporus halli Dasmann & H.M. Smith, 1974

Synonyms
- Sceloporus megalepidurus halli Dasmann & H.M. Smith, 1974

Species of lizard

Sceloporus halli, also known commonly as Hall's spiny lizard and la espinosa de Hall in Mexican Spanish, is a species of lizard in the family Phrynosomatidae. The species is endemic to Mexico.

== Etymology ==
The specific name, halli, is in honor of biologist William Purington Hall III (born 1939).

== Geographic range ==
S. halli is found in the Mexican state of Oaxaca.

== Habitat ==
The preferred natural habitat of S. halli is shrubland.

== Reproduction ==
S. halli is ovoviviparous.
