= Sceloporus insignis =

Conservation status
- Least Concern (IUCN 3.1)

Scientific classification
- Kingdom: Animalia
- Phylum: Chordata
- Class: Reptilia
- Order: Squamata
- Suborder: Iguania
- Family: Phrynosomatidae
- Genus: Sceloporus
- Species: S. insignis

Binomial name
- Sceloporus insignis Webb, 1967

Species of lizard

Sceloporus insignis, the Michoacán blackcollar lizard or Coalcoman black-collared lizard, is a species of lizard in the family Phrynosomatidae. It is endemic to Mexico, where it is found in the western Sierra Madre del Sur and adjacent valleys of southern Jalisco, northern Colima, to western Michoacán, between 800 and 2,400 meters elevation.
