= Sceloporus lunae =

Conservation status
- Least Concern (IUCN 3.1)

Scientific classification
- Kingdom: Animalia
- Phylum: Chordata
- Class: Reptilia
- Order: Squamata
- Suborder: Iguania
- Family: Phrynosomatidae
- Genus: Sceloporus
- Species: S. lunae

Binomial name
- Sceloporus lunae Bocourt, 1873

Synonyms
- Sceloporus acanthinus lunae Bocourt, 1873

Species of lizard

Sceloporus lunae, also known commonly as Luna's spiny lizard, is a species of lizard in the family Phrynosomatidae. The species is endemic to Guatemala.

== Etymology ==
The specific name, lunae, is in honor of Juan J. Rodriguez Luna (1840–1916), who was the director of the Museo Nacional de Historia Natural of Guatemala.

== Description ==
Moderately large for its genus, Sceloporus lunae may attain a snout-to-vent length (SVL) of 9.5 cm (3.7 in). Dorsally, males are uniformly greenish olive, but females have a double series of dark spots. Males have a black shoulder patch, which is absent in females.

== Habitat ==
The preferred natural habitat of Sceloporus lunae is forest, at altitudes of 150–1,000 m (490–3,280 ft).

== Reproduction ==
Sceloporus lunae is viviparous.
