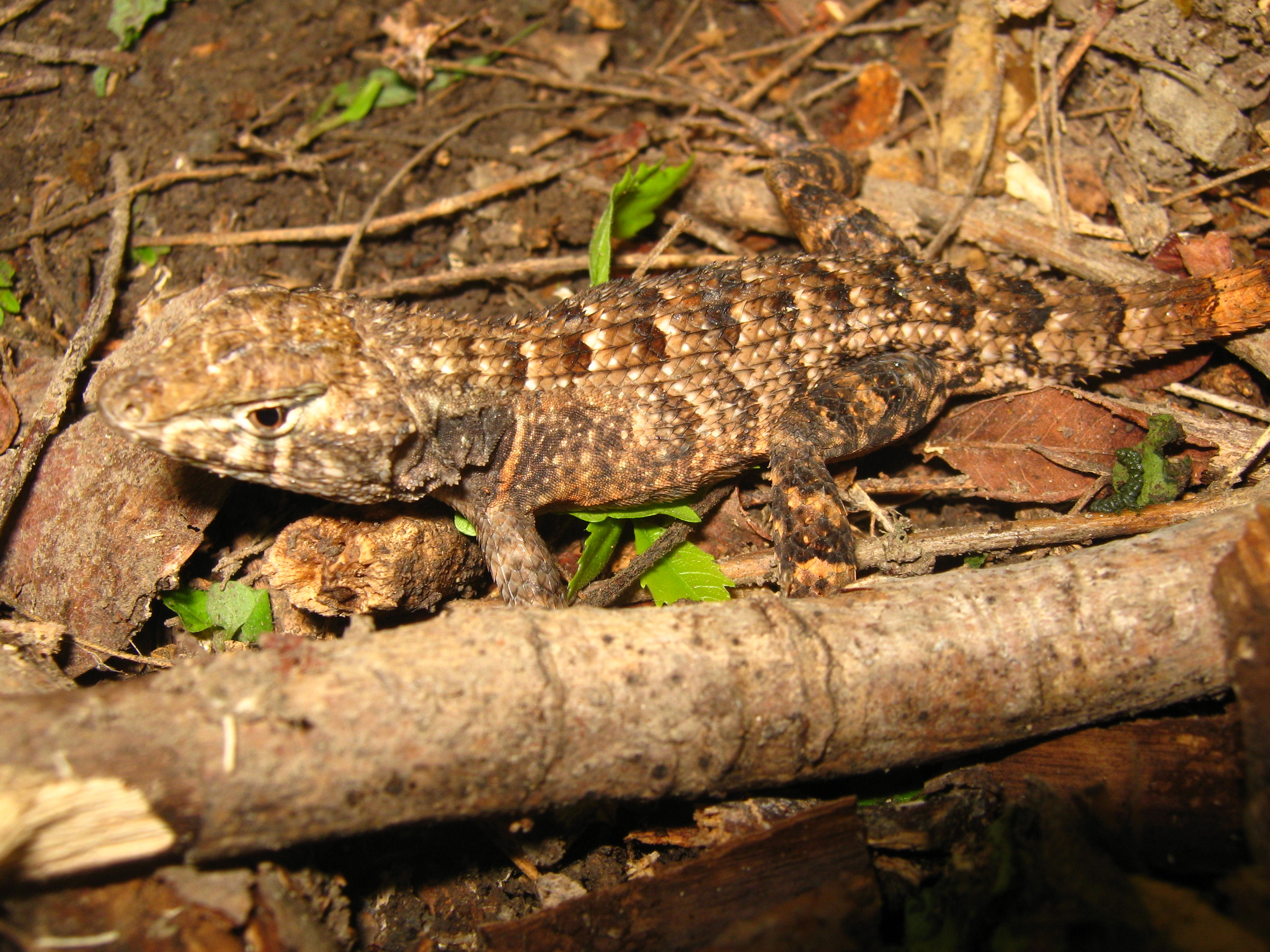

Conservation status
- Least Concern (IUCN 3.1)

Scientific classification
- Domain: Eukaryota
- Kingdom: Animalia
- Phylum: Chordata
- Class: Reptilia
- Order: Squamata
- Suborder: Iguania
- Family: Phrynosomatidae
- Genus: Sceloporus
- Species: S. utiformis

Binomial name
- Sceloporus utiformis Cope, 1864

= Sceloporus utiformis =

Species of lizard

Sceloporus utiformis, Cope's largescale spiny lizard, is a species of lizard in the family Phrynosomatidae. It is endemic to Mexico.
