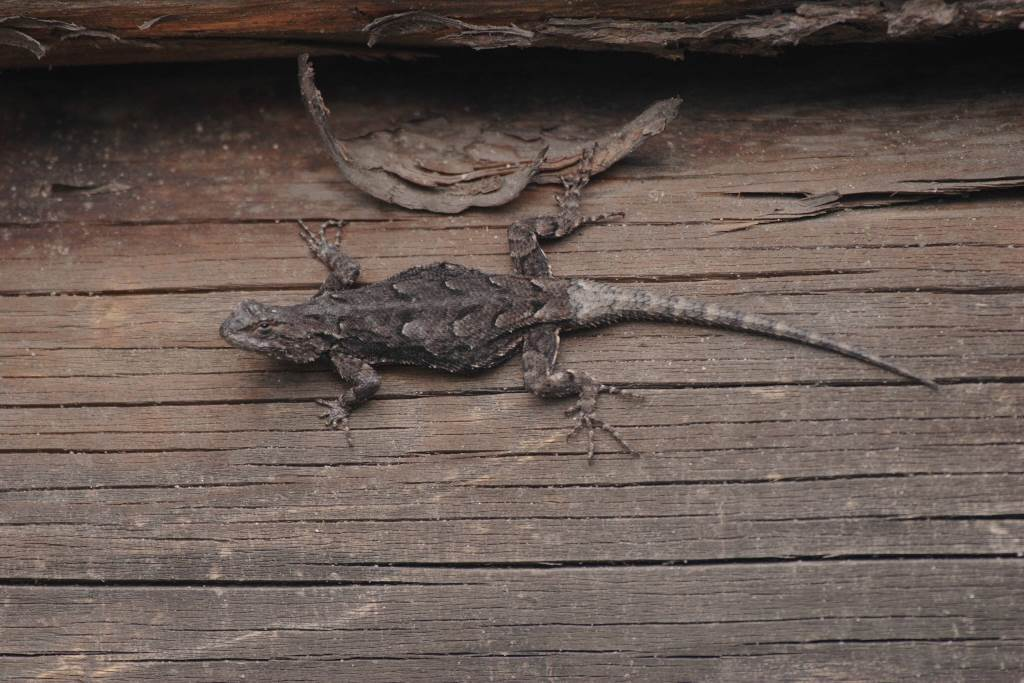

Conservation status
- Data Deficient (IUCN 3.1)

Scientific classification
- Kingdom: Animalia
- Phylum: Chordata
- Class: Reptilia
- Order: Squamata
- Suborder: Iguania
- Family: Phrynosomatidae
- Genus: Sceloporus
- Species: S. lemosespinali

Binomial name
- Sceloporus lemosespinali Lara-Góngora, 2004

= Sceloporus lemosespinali =

Species of lizard

Sceloporus lemosespinali, also known commonly as the Chihuhuan mesquite lizard, Lemos-Espinal's spiny lizard, and la lagartija de Lemos-Espinal in Mexican Spanish, is a species of lizard in the family Phrynosomatidae. The species is endemic to Mexico.

== Etymology ==
The specific name, lemosespinali, is in honor of Mexican herpetologist Julio Alberto Lemos-Espinal.

== Geographic range ==
S. lemosespinali is found in the Sierra Madre Occidental, in the Mexican states of Chihuahua, Sinaloa, and Sonora.

The type locality is "13 km NW of Yécora, Sonora".

== Habitat ==
The preferred natural habitat of S. lemosespinali is forest, at altitudes of 1,800–2,500 m (5,900–8,200 ft).

== Reproduction ==
S. lemosespinali is viviparous.
