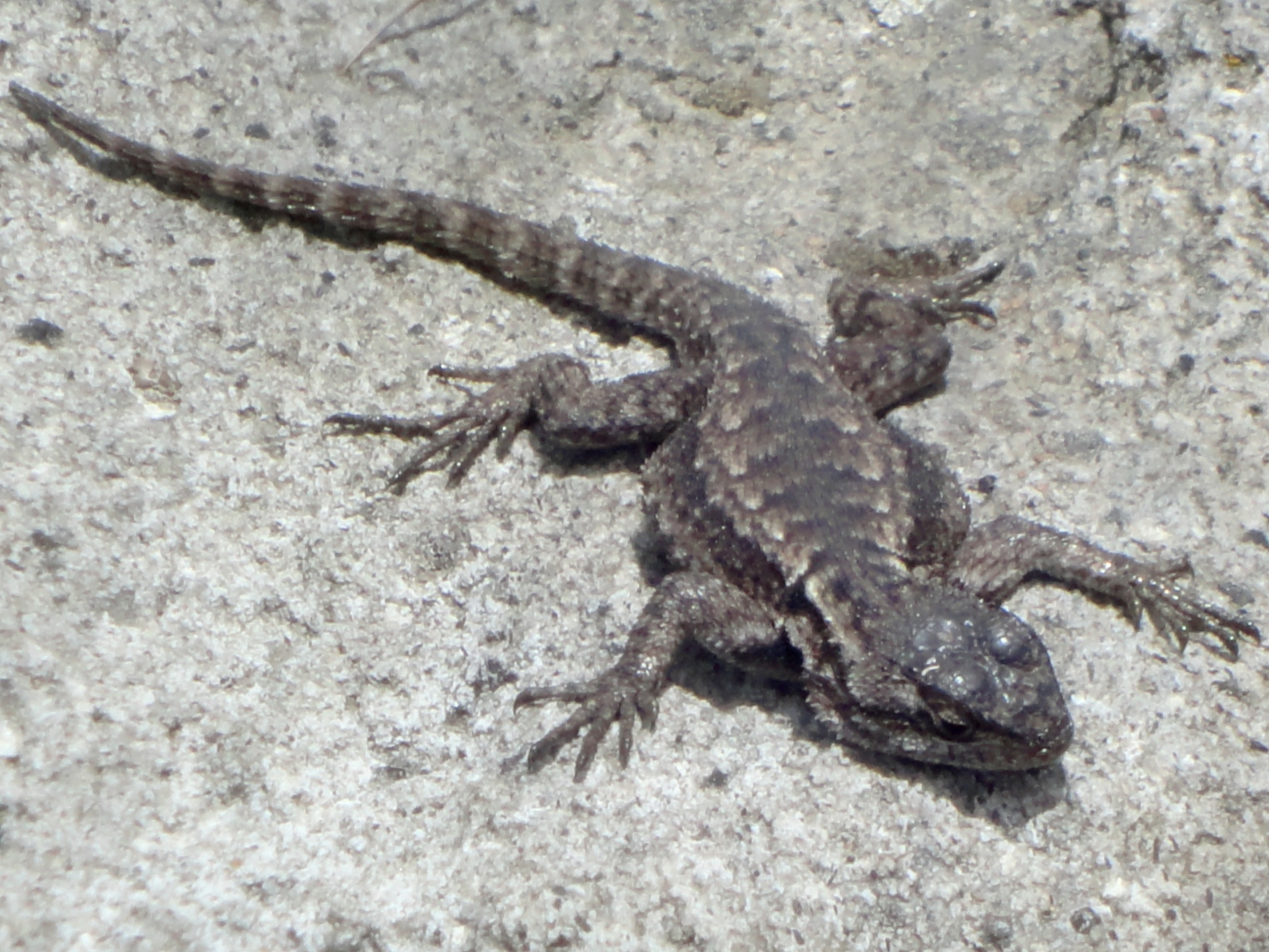

Conservation status
- Least Concern (IUCN 3.1)

Scientific classification
- Domain: Eukaryota
- Kingdom: Animalia
- Phylum: Chordata
- Class: Reptilia
- Order: Squamata
- Suborder: Iguania
- Family: Phrynosomatidae
- Genus: Sceloporus
- Species: S. anahuacus

Binomial name
- Sceloporus anahuacus Lara-Góngora, 1983

= Sceloporus anahuacus =

Species of lizard

Sceloporus anahuacus, the Anahuacan bunchgrass lizard or Anahuacan graphic lizard, is a species of lizard in the family Phrynosomatidae. It is endemic to Mexico.
