= Sceloporus bulleri =

Conservation status
- Least Concern (IUCN 3.1)

Scientific classification
- Kingdom: Animalia
- Phylum: Chordata
- Class: Reptilia
- Order: Squamata
- Suborder: Iguania
- Family: Phrynosomatidae
- Genus: Sceloporus
- Species: S. bulleri

Binomial name
- Sceloporus bulleri Boulenger, 1895

Species of lizard

Sceloporus bulleri, Buller's spiny lizard, is a species of lizard in the family of Phrynosomatidae. It is endemic to Mexico.
