= Sceloporus brownorum =

Scientific classification
- Kingdom: Animalia
- Phylum: Chordata
- Class: Reptilia
- Order: Squamata
- Suborder: Iguania
- Family: Phrynosomatidae
- Genus: Sceloporus
- Species: S. brownorum

Binomial name
- Sceloporus brownorum Smith, Watkins-Colwell, Lemos-Espinal, & Chiszar, 1997

Species of lizard

Sceloporus brownorum, Brown's bunchgrass lizard, is a species of lizard belonging to the family Phrynosomatidae. It is endemic to Mexico.
