= Sceloporus schmidti =

Scientific classification
- Domain: Eukaryota
- Kingdom: Animalia
- Phylum: Chordata
- Class: Reptilia
- Order: Squamata
- Suborder: Iguania
- Family: Phrynosomatidae
- Genus: Sceloporus
- Species: S. schmidti

Binomial name
- Sceloporus schmidti Jones, 1927

Species of lizard

Sceloporus schmidti, Schmidt's emerald lizard, is a species of lizard in the family Phrynosomatidae. It is endemic to Honduras.
