= Sceloporus edbelli =

Scientific classification
- Domain: Eukaryota
- Kingdom: Animalia
- Phylum: Chordata
- Class: Reptilia
- Order: Squamata
- Suborder: Iguania
- Family: Phrynosomatidae
- Genus: Sceloporus
- Species: S. edbelli

Binomial name
- Sceloporus edbelli Smith, Chiszar, & Lemos-Espinal, 2002

Species of lizard

Sceloporus edbelli, Bell's spiny lizard, is a species of lizard in the family Phrynosomatidae. It is endemic to Mexico.
