= Sceloporus binocularis =

Scientific classification
- Domain: Eukaryota
- Kingdom: Animalia
- Phylum: Chordata
- Class: Reptilia
- Order: Squamata
- Suborder: Iguania
- Family: Phrynosomatidae
- Genus: Sceloporus
- Species: S. binocularis

Binomial name
- Sceloporus binocularis Dunn, 1936

Species of lizard

Sceloporus binocularis, the Nuevo León crevice swift, is a species of lizard in the family Phrynosomatidae. It is endemic to Mexico.
