= Sceloporus palaciosi =

Conservation status
- Least Concern (IUCN 3.1)

Scientific classification
- Kingdom: Animalia
- Phylum: Chordata
- Class: Reptilia
- Order: Squamata
- Suborder: Iguania
- Family: Phrynosomatidae
- Genus: Sceloporus
- Species: S. palaciosi

Binomial name
- Sceloporus palaciosi Lara-Góngora, 1983

Synonyms
- Sceloporus altamontanus Lara Góngara, 1978

Species of lizard

Sceloporus palaciosi, also known commonly as Palacios's bunchgrass lizard, Palacios' bunchgrass lizard, and la lagartija arborícola de Palacios in Mexican Spanish, is a species of lizard in the family Phrynosomatidae. The species is endemic to Mexico.

== Etymology ==
The specific name, palaciosi, is in honor of Prococo Palacios of Comunidad Rancho el Capulin, Mexico.

== Geographic distribution ==
Sceloporus palaciosi is found in the Mexican states of Guerrero, Mexico, and Morelos.

== Habitat ==
The preferred natural habitat of Sceloporus palaciosi is forest, at elevations of 2,700–4,400 m (8,900–14,400 ft).

== Reproduction ==
The mode of reproduction of Sceloporus palaciosi has been described as viviparous and as ovoviviparous.
