= Sceloporus heterolepis =

Conservation status
- Least Concern (IUCN 3.1)

Scientific classification
- Domain: Eukaryota
- Kingdom: Animalia
- Phylum: Chordata
- Class: Reptilia
- Order: Squamata
- Suborder: Iguania
- Family: Phrynosomatidae
- Genus: Sceloporus
- Species: S. heterolepis

Binomial name
- Sceloporus heterolepis Boulenger, 1895

Species of lizard

Sceloporus heterolepis, the dorsalkeel spiny lizard or southern odd-scaled lizard, is a species of lizard in the family Phrynosomatidae. It is endemic to Mexico.
