= Sceloporus jalapae =

Conservation status
- Least Concern (IUCN 3.1)

Scientific classification
- Domain: Eukaryota
- Kingdom: Animalia
- Phylum: Chordata
- Class: Reptilia
- Order: Squamata
- Suborder: Iguania
- Family: Phrynosomatidae
- Genus: Sceloporus
- Species: S. jalapae

Binomial name
- Sceloporus jalapae Günther, 1890

Species of lizard

Sceloporus jalapae, the Jalapa spiny lizard, is a species of lizard in the family Phrynosomatidae. It is endemic to Mexico.
