= Sceloporus olloporus =

Scientific classification
- Domain: Eukaryota
- Kingdom: Animalia
- Phylum: Chordata
- Class: Reptilia
- Order: Squamata
- Suborder: Iguania
- Family: Phrynosomatidae
- Genus: Sceloporus
- Species: S. olloporus

Binomial name
- Sceloporus olloporus H.M. Smith, 1937

Species of lizard

Sceloporus olloporus, the southern rosebelly lizard, is a species of lizard in the family Phrynosomatidae. It is found in Guatemala, Honduras, Nicaragua, and Costa Rica.
