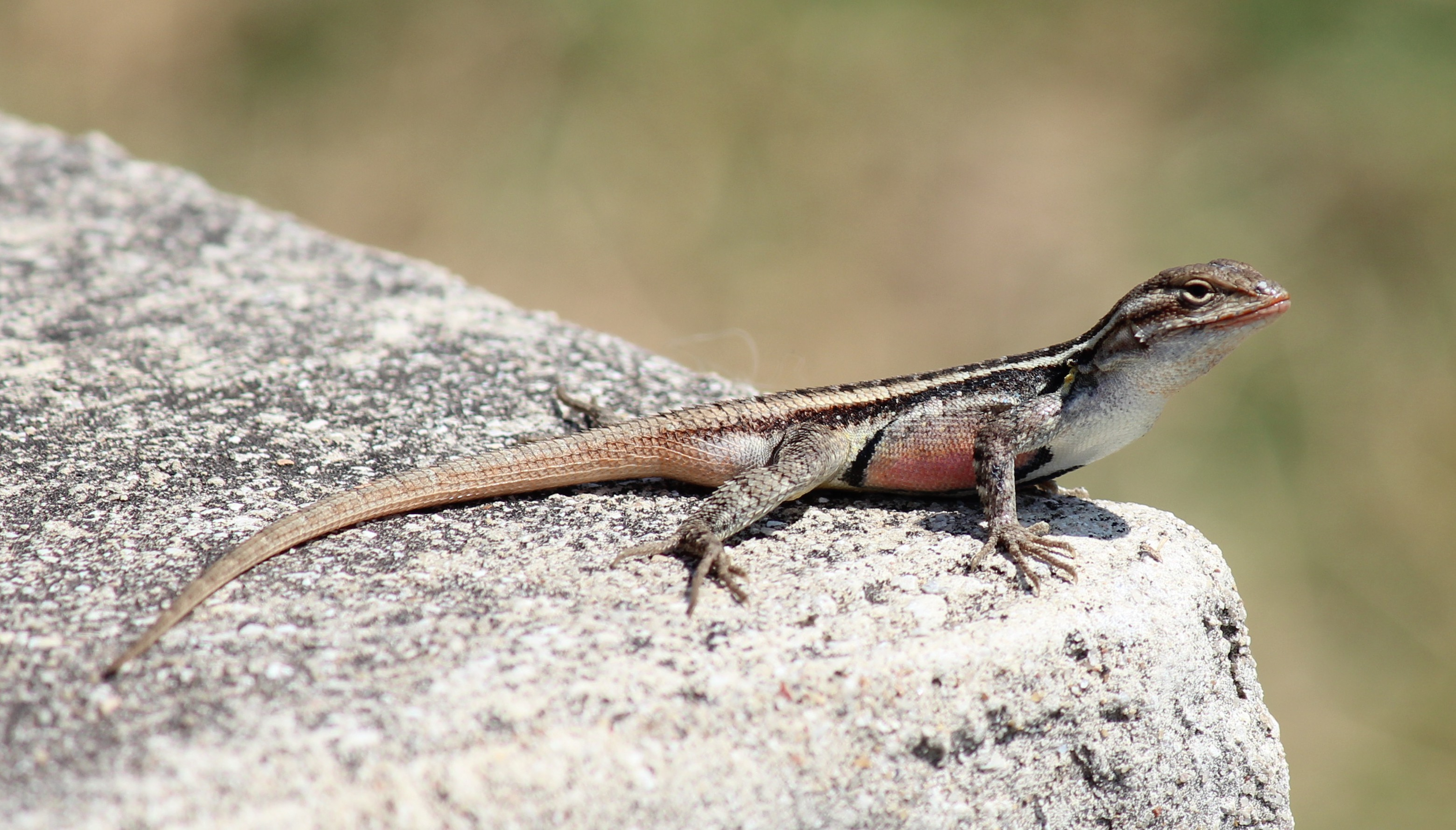

Scientific classification
- Domain: Eukaryota
- Kingdom: Animalia
- Phylum: Chordata
- Class: Reptilia
- Order: Squamata
- Suborder: Iguania
- Family: Phrynosomatidae
- Genus: Sceloporus
- Species: S. marmoratus

Binomial name
- Sceloporus marmoratus Hallowell, 1852

= Sceloporus marmoratus =

Species of lizard

Sceloporus marmoratus, the northern rosebelly lizard, is a species of lizard in the family Phrynosomatidae. It is native to Texas in the United States and Mexico.
