= Sceloporus albiventris =

Scientific classification
- Domain: Eukaryota
- Kingdom: Animalia
- Phylum: Chordata
- Class: Reptilia
- Order: Squamata
- Suborder: Iguania
- Family: Phrynosomatidae
- Genus: Sceloporus
- Species: S. albiventris

Binomial name
- Sceloporus albiventris H.M. Smith, 1939

Species of lizard

Sceloporus albiventris, the white-bellied rough lizard, is a species of lizard in the family Phrynosomatidae. It is endemic to Mexico.
