= Sceloporus macdougalli =

Conservation status
- Least Concern (IUCN 3.1)

Scientific classification
- Kingdom: Animalia
- Phylum: Chordata
- Class: Reptilia
- Order: Squamata
- Suborder: Iguania
- Family: Phrynosomatidae
- Genus: Sceloporus
- Species: S. macdougalli

Binomial name
- Sceloporus macdougalli H.M. Smith & Bumzahem, 1953

Species of lizard

Sceloporus macdougalli, also known commonly as MacDougall's spiny lizard, is a species of lizard in the family Phrynosomatidae. The species is endemic to Mexico.

== Etymology ==
The specific name, macdougalli, is in honor of naturalist Thomas Baillie MacDougall.

== Habitat ==
The preferred natural habitat of Sceloporus macdougalli is forest, at altitudes from near sea level to 600 m (2,000 ft).
