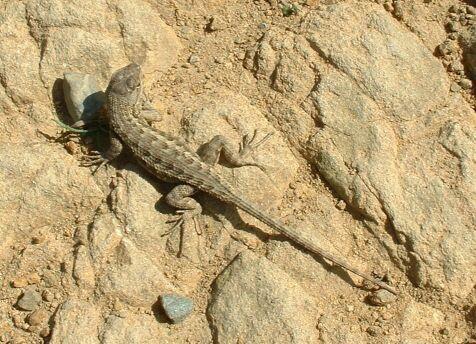
- Western fence lizard, Sceloporus occidentalis

Scientific classification
- Kingdom: Animalia
- Phylum: Chordata
- Class: Reptilia
- Order: Squamata
- Suborder: Iguania
- Family: Phrynosomatidae
- Genus: Sceloporus; Wiegmann, 1828

Synonyms
- Sator Dickerson, 1919

= Spiny lizard =

Genus of lizards

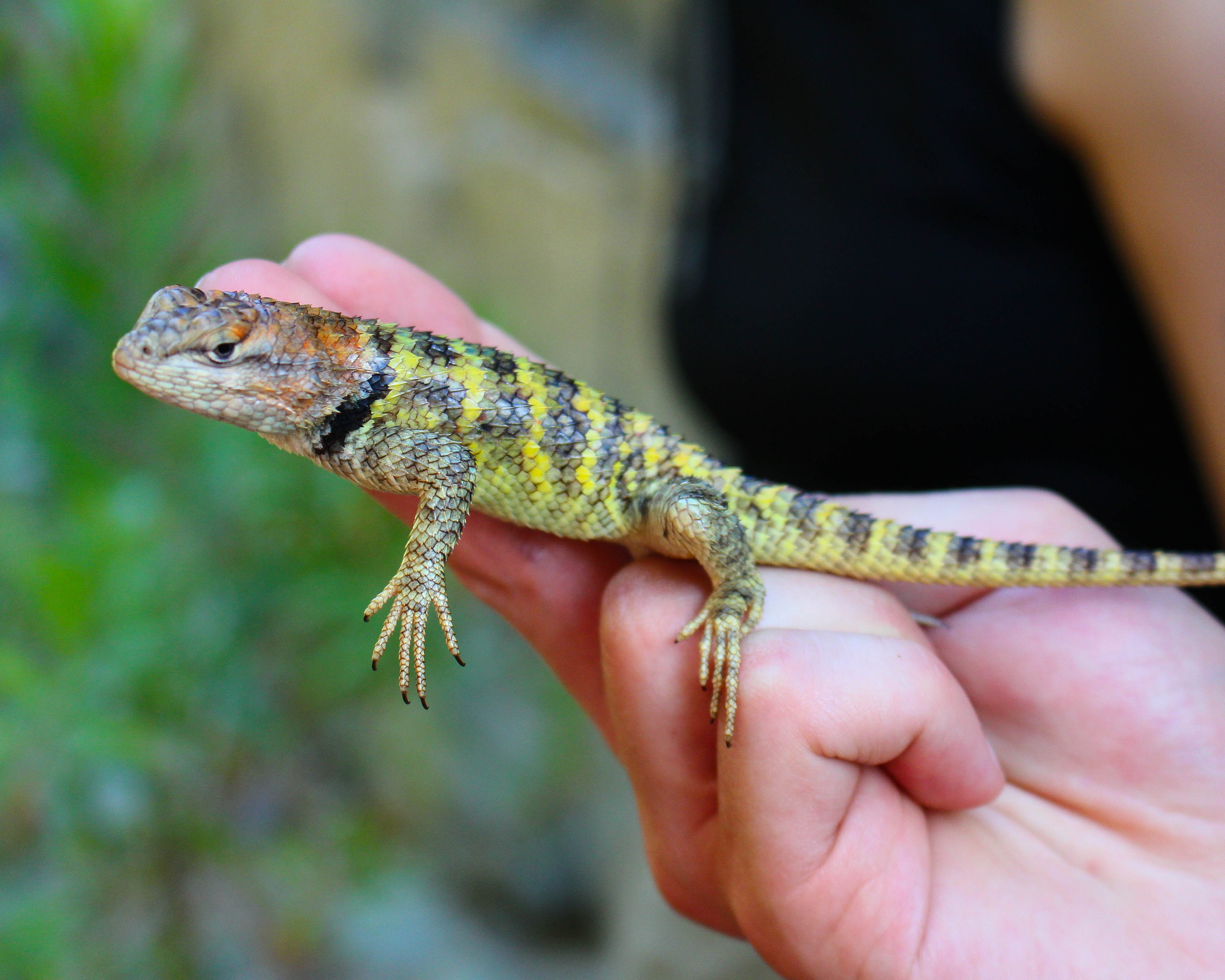
A yellow-backed spiny lizard, Sceloporus uniformis

Spiny lizards is a common name for the genus Sceloporus in the family Phrynosomatidae. The genus is endemic to North America, with various species ranging from New York, to Washington, and one occurring as far south as northern Panama. The greatest diversity is found in Mexico. This genus includes some of the most commonly seen lizards in the United States. Other common names for lizards in this genus include fence lizards, scaly lizards, bunchgrass lizards, and swifts.

== Taxonomy ==
The 114 species in the genus Sceloporus are organized into 21 species groups. However, their relationships to each other are currently under review. Listed below are species of Sceloporus:

=== Species ===
- Sceloporus acanthinus Bocourt, 1873
- Sceloporus adleri H.M. Smith & Savitzky, 1974
- Sceloporus aeneus Wiegmann, 1828
- Sceloporus albiventris H.M. Smith, 1939
- Sceloporus anahuacus Lara-Góngora, 1983
- Sceloporus angustus (Dickerson, 1919) – Santa Cruz Island sator
- Sceloporus arenicolus Degenhardt & K.L. Jones, 1972 – dunes sagebrush lizard
- Sceloporus asper Boulenger, 1897
- Sceloporus aurantius Grummer & Bryson, 2014
- Sceloporus aureolus H.M. Smith, 1942
- Sceloporus becki Van Denburgh, 1905 – island fence lizard
- Sceloporus bicanthalis H.M. Smith, 1937
- Sceloporus bimaculosus Phelan & Brattstrom, 1955 – two-spotted spiny lizard
- Sceloporus binocularis Dunn, 1936
- Sceloporus brownorum H.M. Smith et al., 1997
- Sceloporus bulleri Boulenger, 1895
- Sceloporus caeruleus H.M. Smith, 1936
- Sceloporus carinatus H.M. Smith, 1936
- Sceloporus cautus H.M. Smith, 1938
- Sceloporus chaneyi Liner & Dixon, 1992
- Sceloporus chrysostictus Cope, 1866 – yellow-spotted spiny lizard, Yucatán spiny lizard
- Sceloporus clarkii Baird & Girard, 1852 – Clark's spiny lizard
- Sceloporus consobrinus Baird & Girard, 1854 – prairie lizard
- Sceloporus couchii Baird, 1859
- Sceloporus cowlesi Lowe & Norris, 1956 – southwestern fence lizard
- Sceloporus cozumelae J.P. Jones, 1927
- Sceloporus cryptus H.M. Smith & Lynch, 1967
- Sceloporus cupreus Bocourt, 1873
- Sceloporus cyanogenys Cope, 1885
- Sceloporus cyanostictus R.W. Axtell & C.A. Axtell, 1971
- Sceloporus dixoni Bryson & Grummer, 2021
- Sceloporus druckercolini Pérez-Ramos & Saldaña-de La Riva, 2008
- Sceloporus dugesii Bocourt, 1874
- Sceloporus edbelli H.M. Smith, Chiszar & Lemos-Espinal, 2003
- Sceloporus edwardtaylori H.M. Smith, 1936
- Sceloporus esperanzae McCranie, 2018
- Sceloporus exsul Dixon, Ketchersid & Lieb, 1972
- Sceloporus formosus Wiegmann, 1834
- Sceloporus gadoviae Boulenger, 1905
- Sceloporus gadsdeni Castañeda-Gaytán & Díaz-Cárdenas, 2017
- Sceloporus goldmani H.M. Smith, 1937
- Sceloporus graciosus Baird & Girard, 1852 – sagebrush lizard
- Sceloporus grammicus Wiegmann, 1828 – mesquite lizard or graphic spiny lizard
- Sceloporus grandaevus (Dickerson, 1919)
- Sceloporus halli Dasmann & H.M. Smith, 1974
- Sceloporus hesperus Bryson & Grummer, 2021
- Sceloporus heterolepis Boulenger, 1895
- Sceloporus hondurensis McCranie, 2018
- Sceloporus horridus Wiegmann, 1834
- Sceloporus huichol Flores-Villela, Smith, Campillo-Garcia, Martinez-Mendez, & Campbell, 2022
- Sceloporus hunsakeri Hall & H.M. Smith, 1979
- Sceloporus insignis Webb, 1967
- Sceloporus internasalis H.M. Smith & Bumzahem, 1955
- Sceloporus jalapae Günther, 1890
- Sceloporus jarrovii Cope, 1875 – Yarrow's spiny lizard
- Sceloporus lemosespinali Lara-Góngora, 2004
- Sceloporus licki Van Denburgh, 1895
- Sceloporus lineatulus Dickerson, 1919
- Sceloporus lunae Bocourt, 1873
- Sceloporus lundelli H.M. Smith, 1939
- Sceloporus macdougalli H.M. Smith & Bumzahem, 1953
- Sceloporus maculosus H.M. Smith, 1934
- Sceloporus madrensis Olson, 1986
- Sceloporus magister Hallowell, 1854 – desert spiny lizard, escorpión
- Sceloporus malachiticus Cope, 1864
- Sceloporus marmoratus Hallowell, 1852 – northern rosebelly lizard
- Sceloporus megalepidurus H.M. Smith, 1934
- Sceloporus melanogaster Cope, 1885
- Sceloporus melanorhinus Bocourt, 1876
- Sceloporus merriami Stejneger, 1904 – canyon lizard
- Sceloporus mikeprestoni H.M. Smith & Alvarez, 1974
- Sceloporus minor Cope, 1885
- Sceloporus mucronatus Cope, 1885
- Sceloporus nelsoni Cochran, 1923
- Sceloporus oberon H.M. Smith & B.C. Brown, 1941
- Sceloporus occidentalis Baird & Girard, 1852 – western fence lizard
- Sceloporus ochoterenae H.M. Smith, 1934
- Sceloporus olivaceus H.M. Smith, 1934 – Texas spiny lizard
- Sceloporus olloporus H.M. Smith, 1937 – southern rosebelly lizard
- Sceloporus omiltemanus Günther, 1890
- Sceloporus orcutti Stejneger, 1893 – granite spiny lizard
- Sceloporus ornatus Baird, 1859 – ornate spiny lizard
- Sceloporus palaciosi Lara-Góngora, 1983
- Sceloporus parvus H.M. Smith, 1934
- Sceloporus poinsettii Baird & Girard, 1852 – crevice spiny lizard
- Sceloporus pyrocephalus Cope, 1864
- Sceloporus salvini Günther, 1890
- Sceloporus samcolemani H.M. Smith & Hall, 1974
- Sceloporus scalaris Wiegmann, 1828 – light-bellied bunchgrass lizard
- Sceloporus schmidti Jones, 1927
- Sceloporus scitulus Smith, 1942 – striated emerald lizard
- Sceloporus serrifer Cope, 1866 – blue spiny lizard
- Sceloporus shannonorum Langebartel, 1959
- Sceloporus siniferus Cope, 1870
- Sceloporus slevini H.M. Smith, 1937 – Slevin's bunchgrass lizard
- Sceloporus smaragdinus Bocourt, 1873
- Sceloporus smithi Hartweg & J.A. Oliver, 1937
- Sceloporus spinosus Wiegmann, 1828
- Sceloporus squamosus Bocourt, 1874
- Sceloporus stejnegeri H.M. Smith, 1942
- Sceloporus subniger Poglayen & Smith, H.M. 1958
- Sceloporus subpictus J.D. Lynch & H.M. Smith, 1965
- Sceloporus sugillatus H.M. Smith, 1942
- Sceloporus taeniocnemis Cope, 1885
- Sceloporus tanneri H.M. Smith & Larsen, 1975 – Tanner's spiny lizard
- Sceloporus teapensis Günther, 1890
- Sceloporus torquatus Wiegmann, 1828 - crevice swift
- Sceloporus tristichus Cope, 1875 – plateau fence lizard
- Sceloporus undulatus (Bosc & Daudin, 1801) – eastern fence lizard
- Sceloporus unicanthalis H.M. Smith, 1937
- Sceloporus uniformis Phelan & Brattstrom, 1955 – yellow-backed spiny lizard
- Sceloporus utiformis Cope, 1864
- Sceloporus vandenburgianus Cope, 1896
- Sceloporus variabilis Wiegmann, 1834 – rosebelly lizard
- Sceloporus virgatus H.M. Smith, 1938 – striped plateau lizard
- Sceloporus woodi Stejneger, 1918 – Florida scrub lizard
- Sceloporus zosteromus Cope, 1863

Nota bene: A binomial authority in parentheses indicates that the species was originally described in a genus other than Sceloporus.

== Sceloporus gallery ==
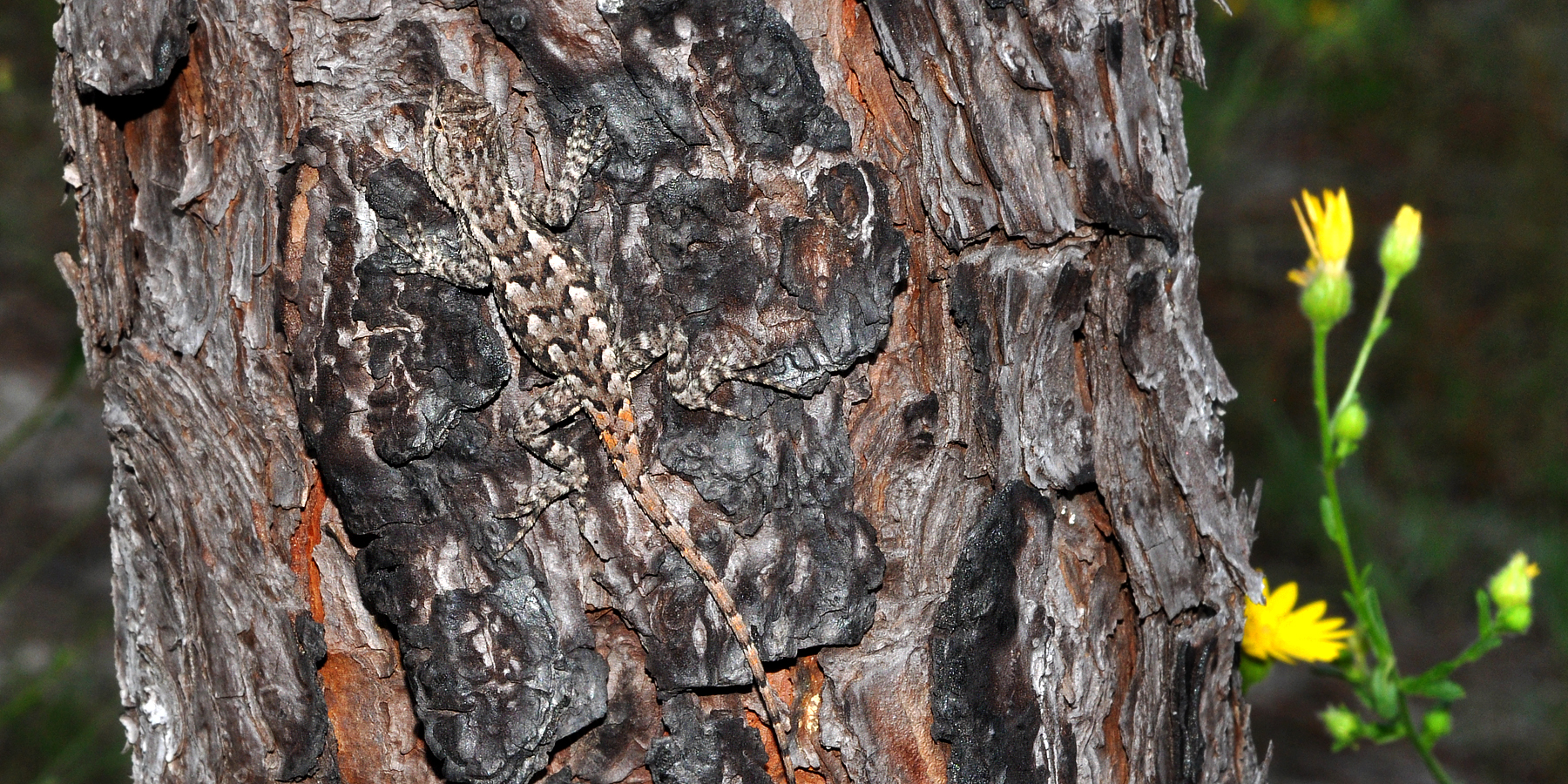
Prairie lizard (S. consobrinus)

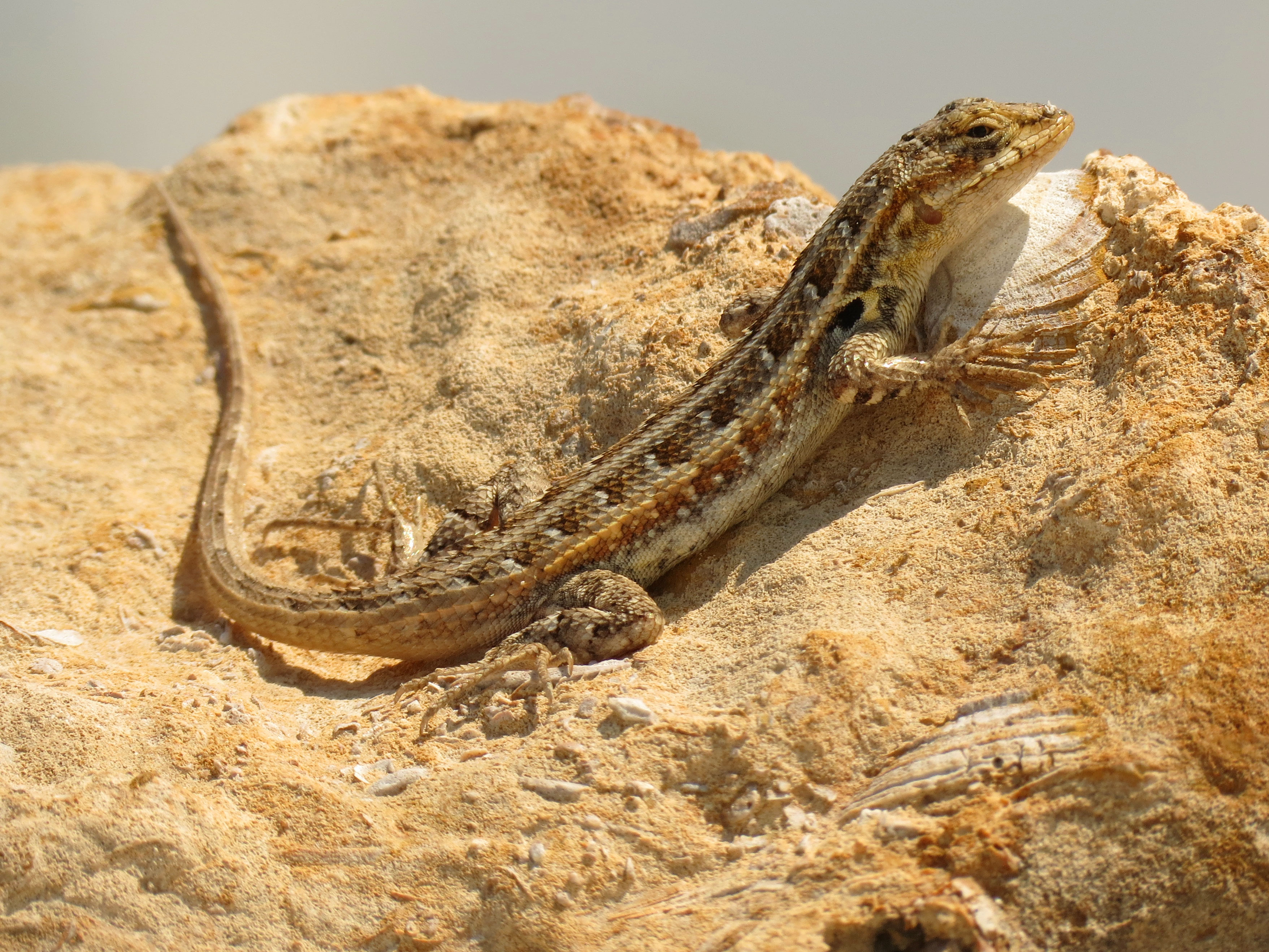
Cozumel spiny lizard (S. cozumelae)

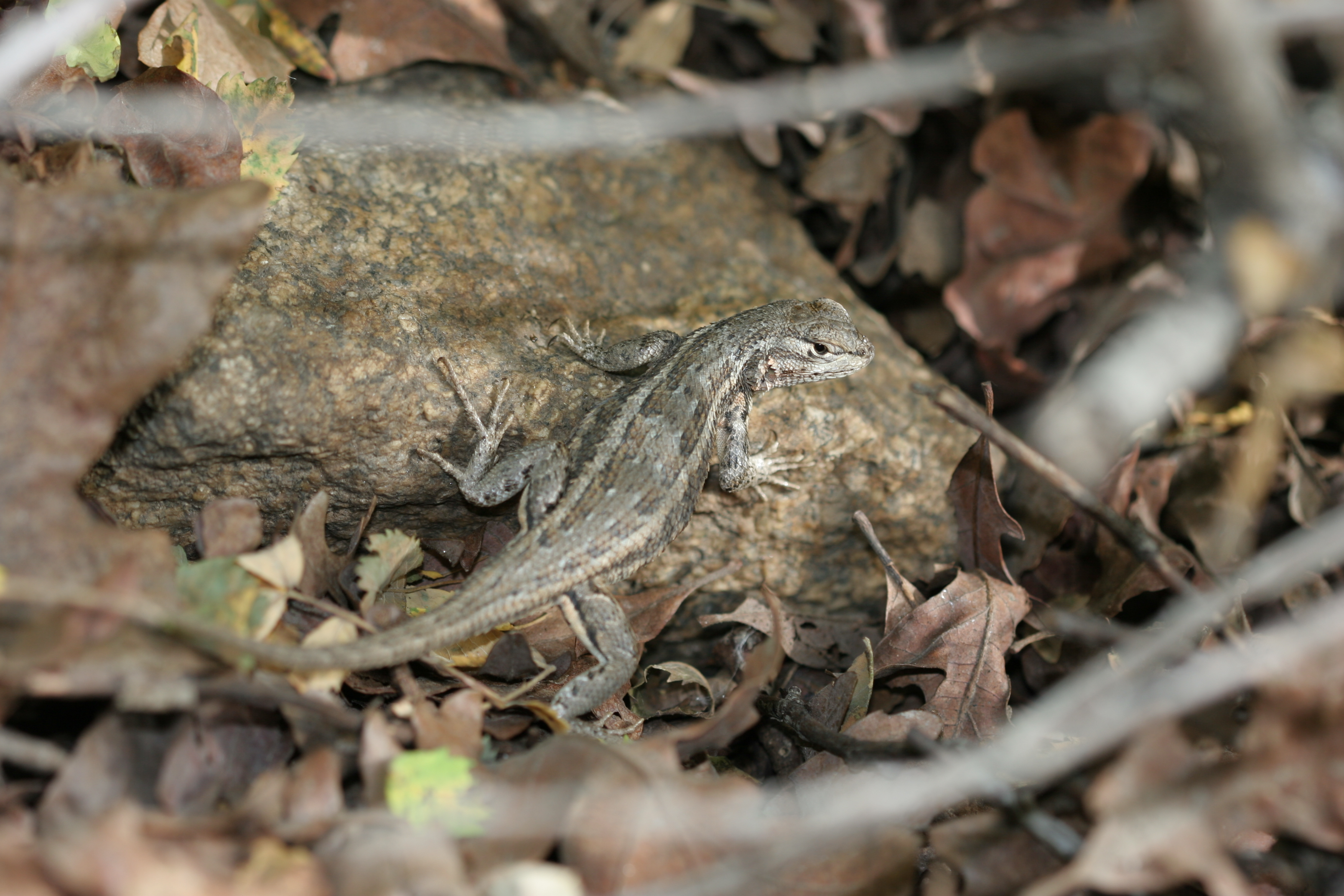
Sagebrush spiny lizard (S. graciosus)

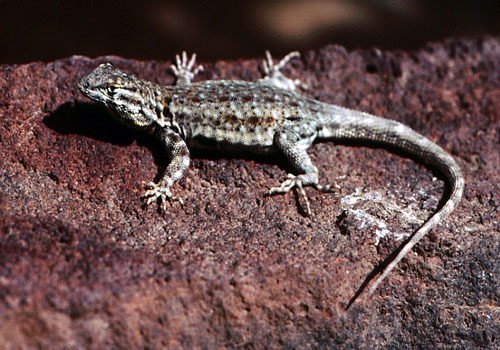
Sagebrush lizard (S. graciosus)

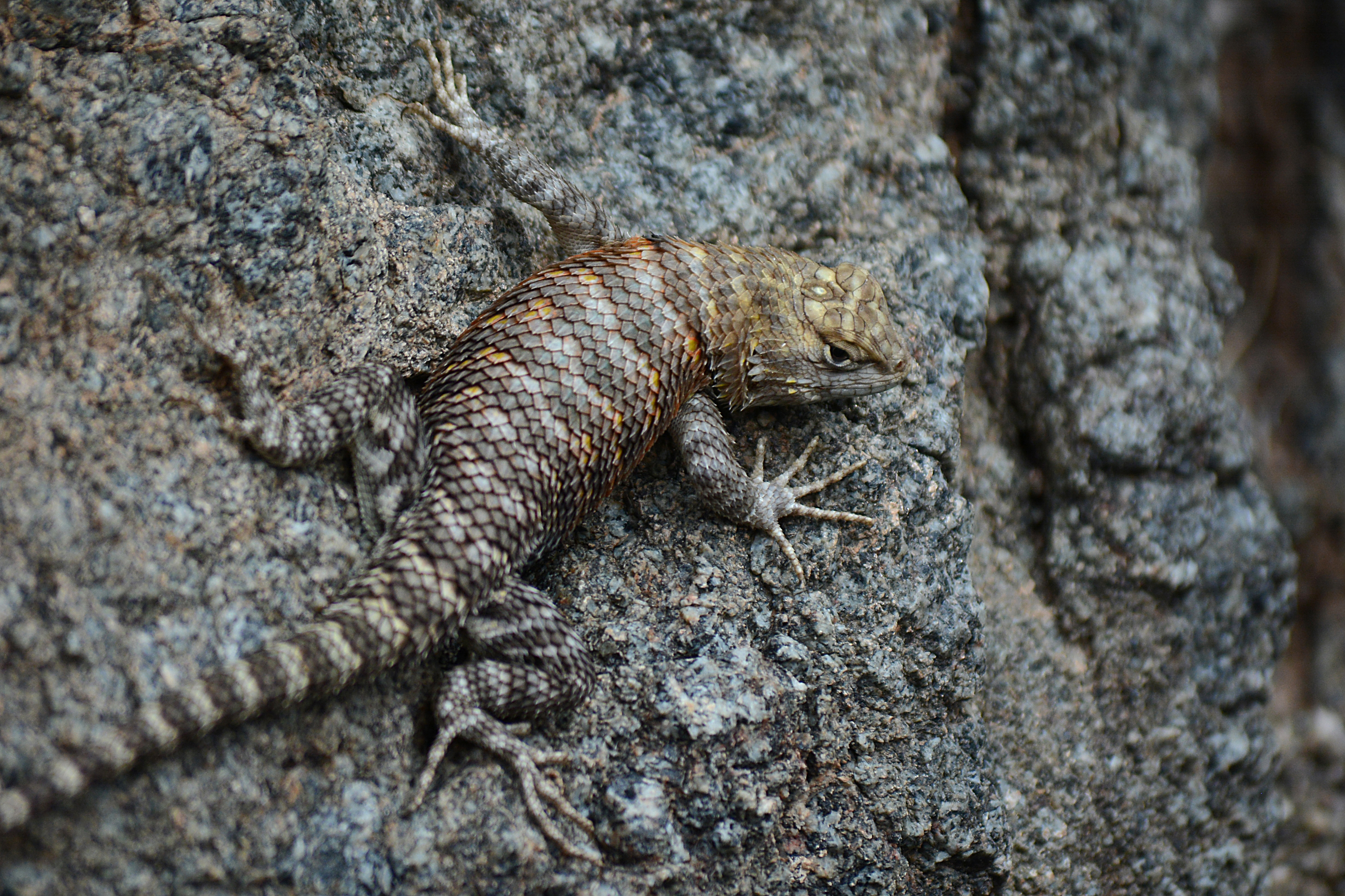
Desert spiny lizard (S. magister)

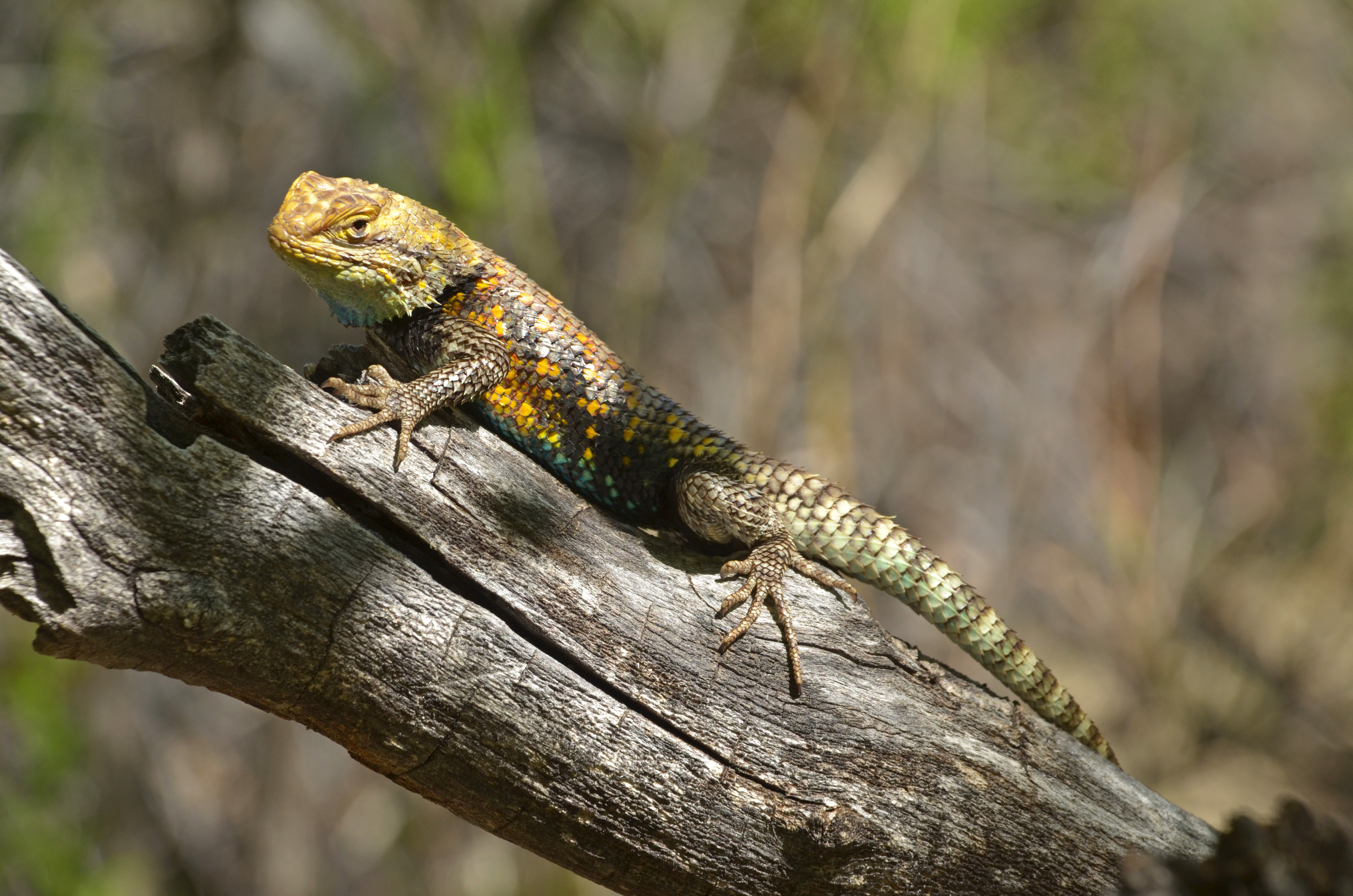
Desert spiny lizard (S. magister)

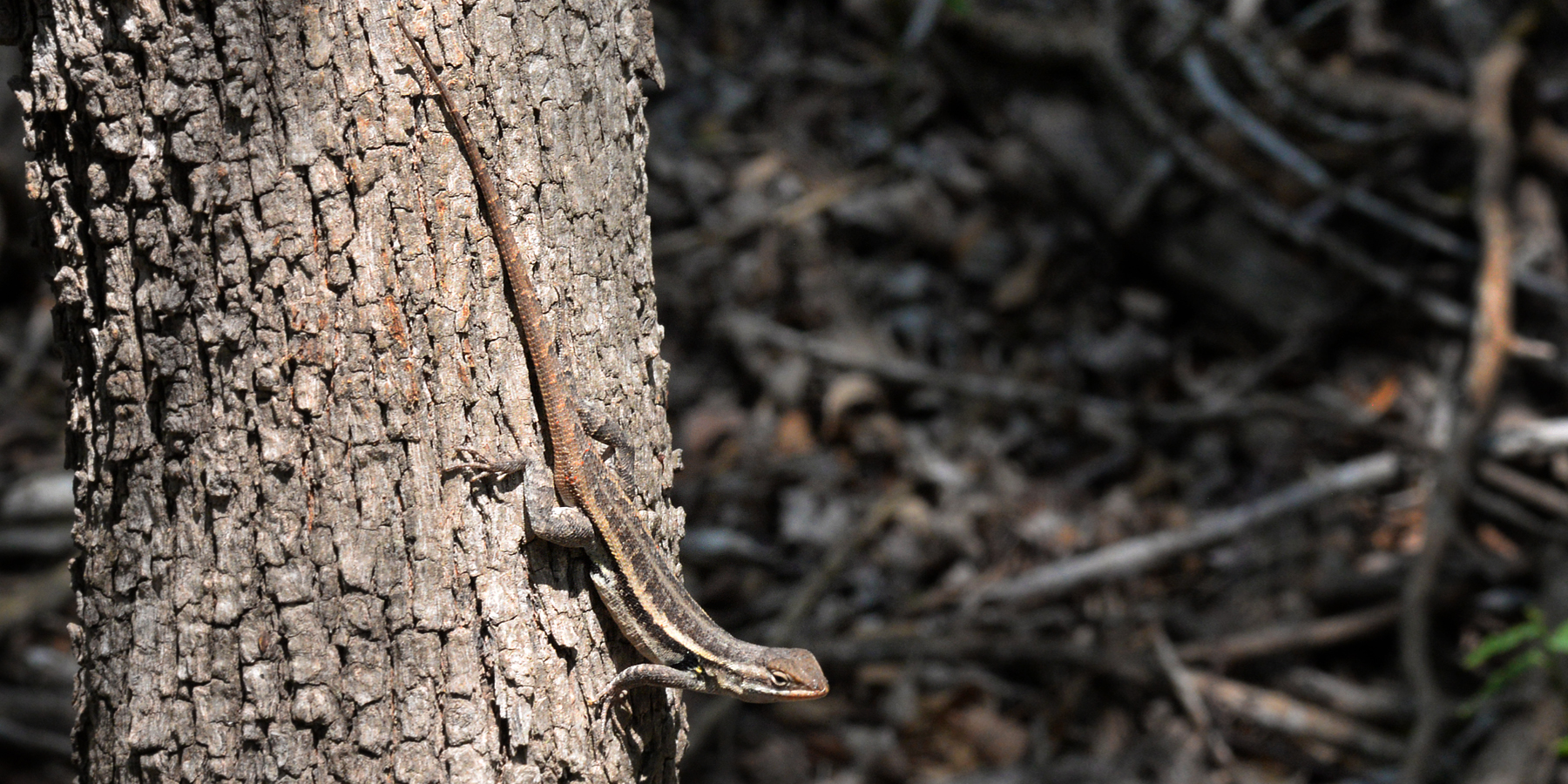
Northern rose-bellied Lizard (S. marmoratus)

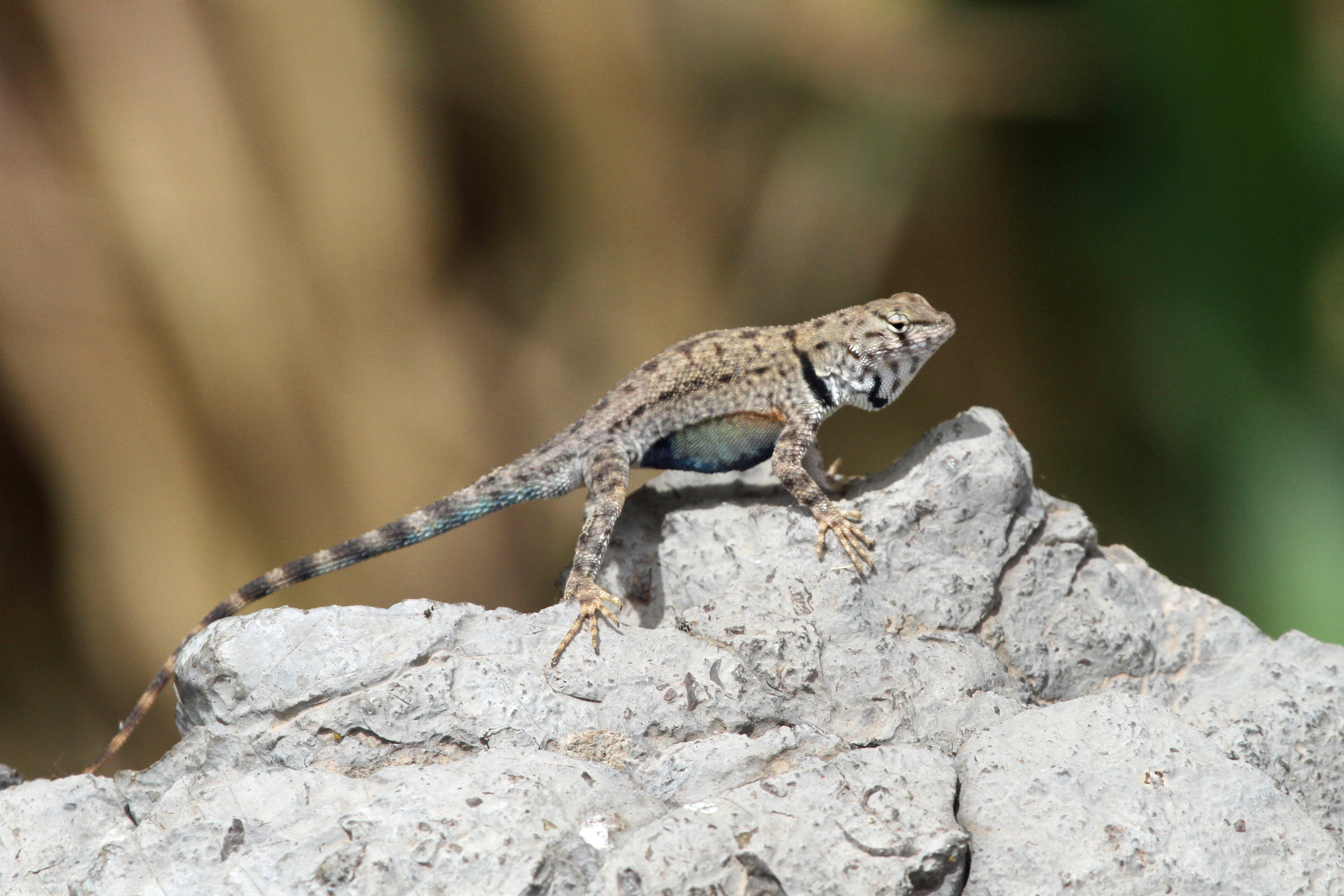
Big Bend canyon lizard (S. merriami annulatus)

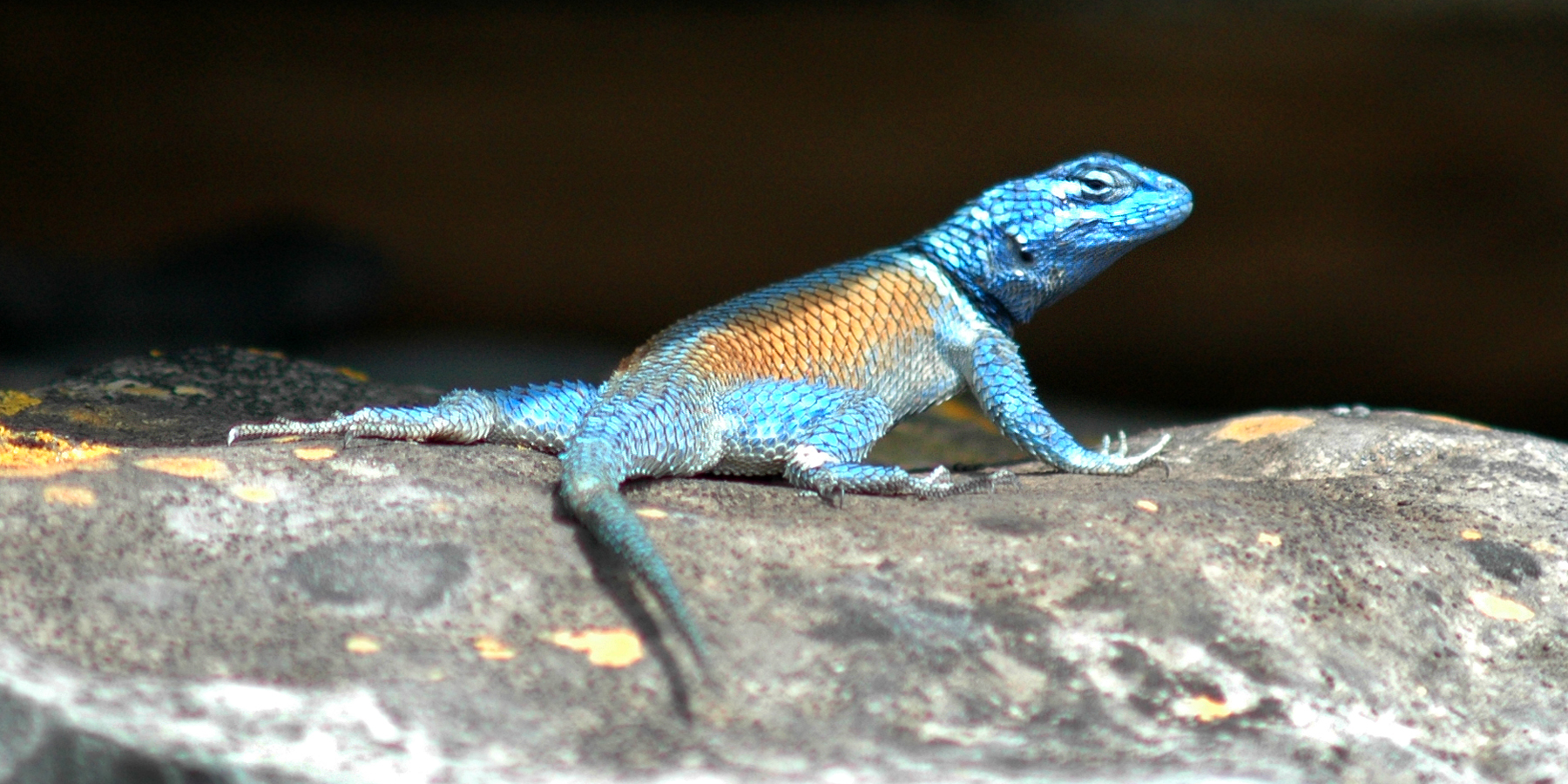
Minor spiny lizard (S. minor) male

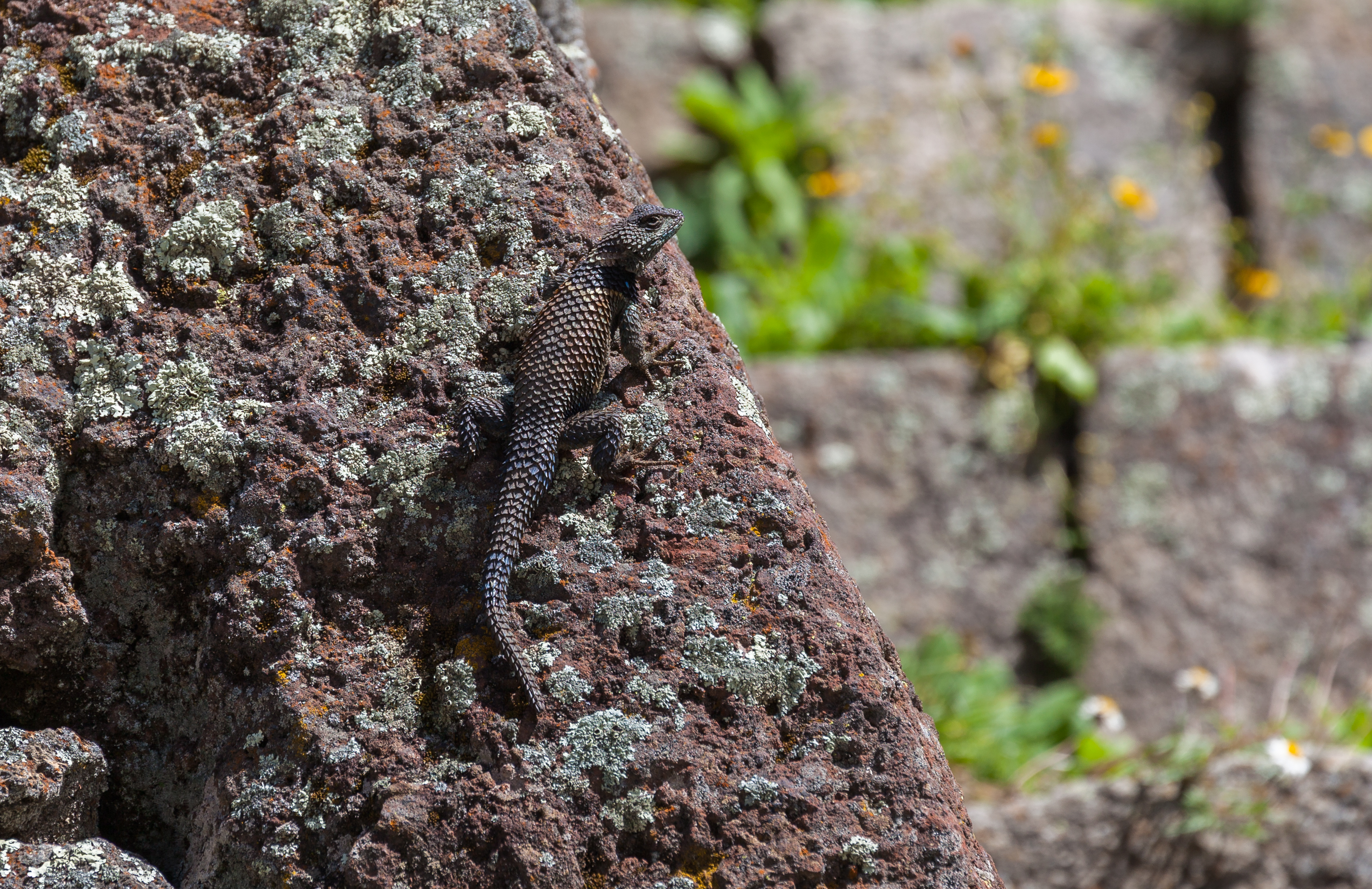
Cleft spiny lizard (S. mucronatus)

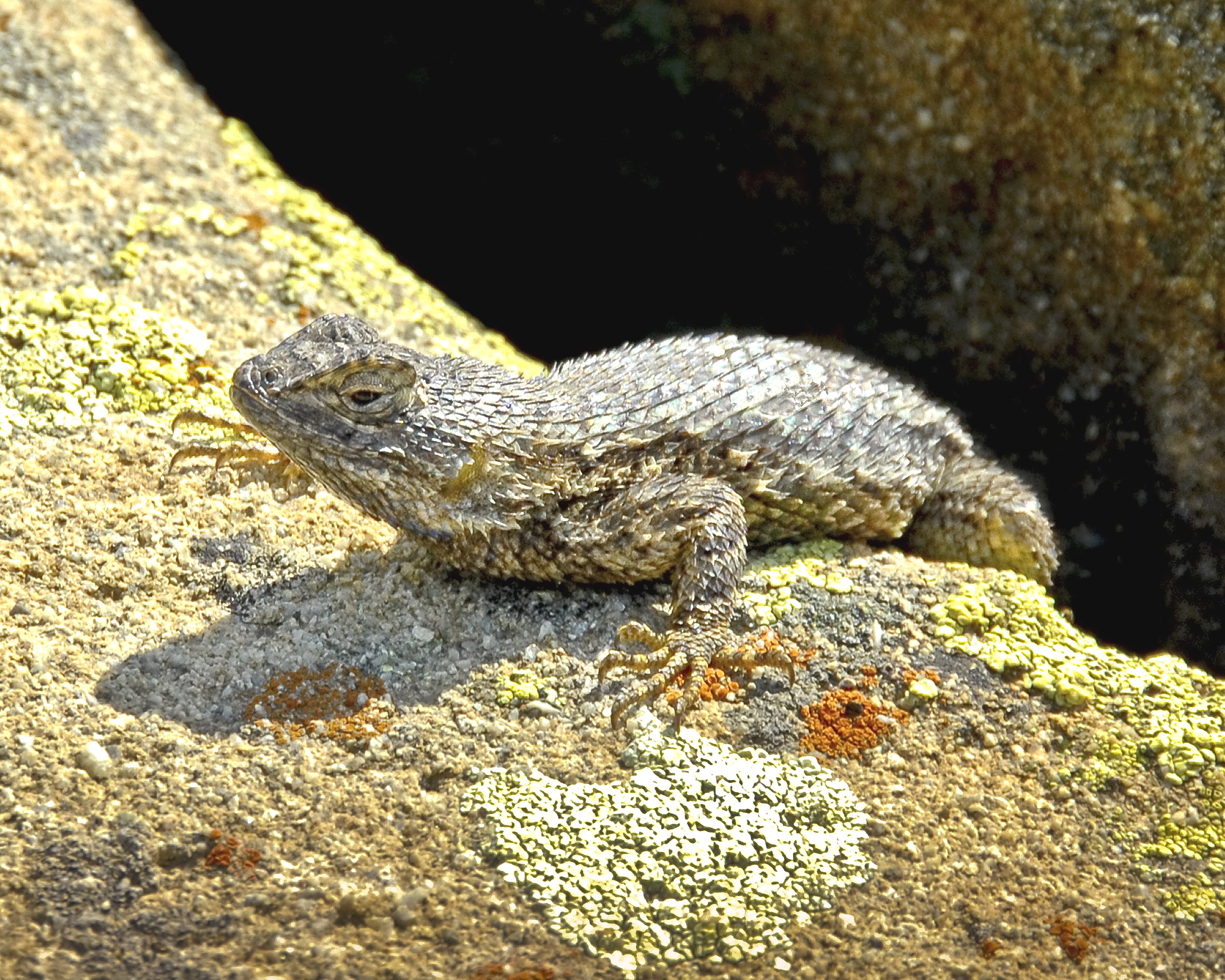
Western fence lizard (S. occidentalis)

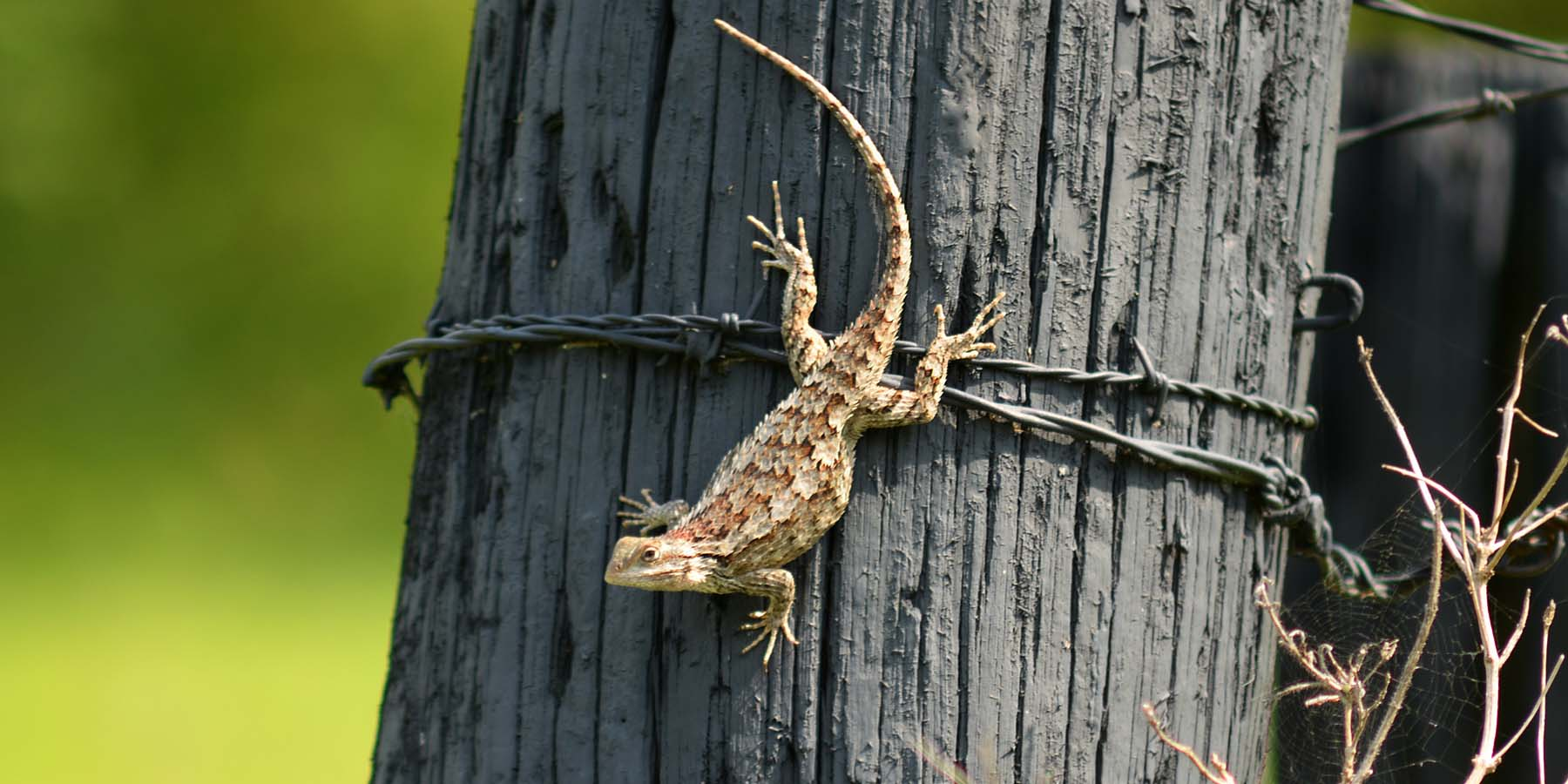
Texas spiny lizard (S. olivaceus)

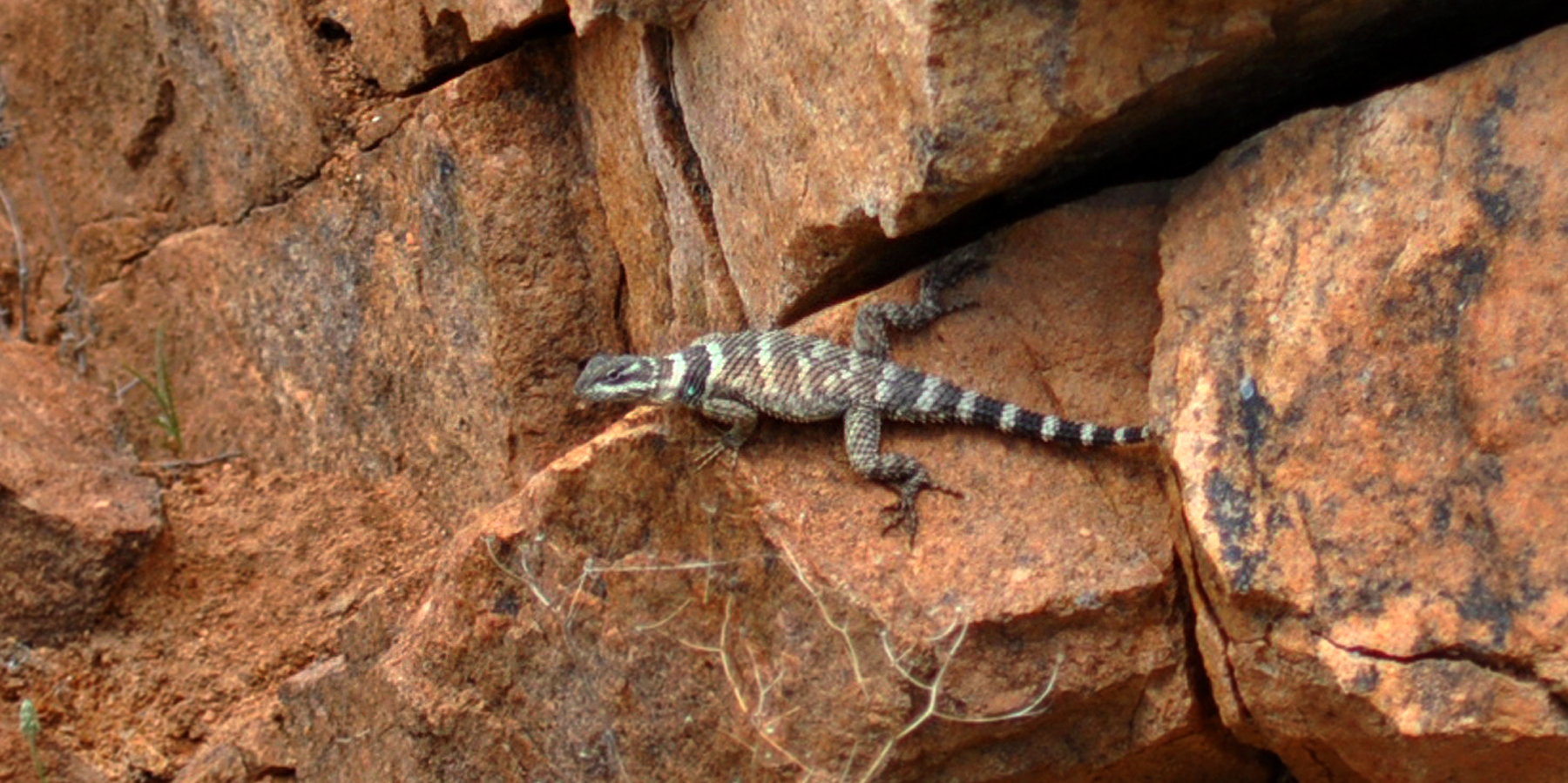
Crevice spiny lizard (S. poinsettii)

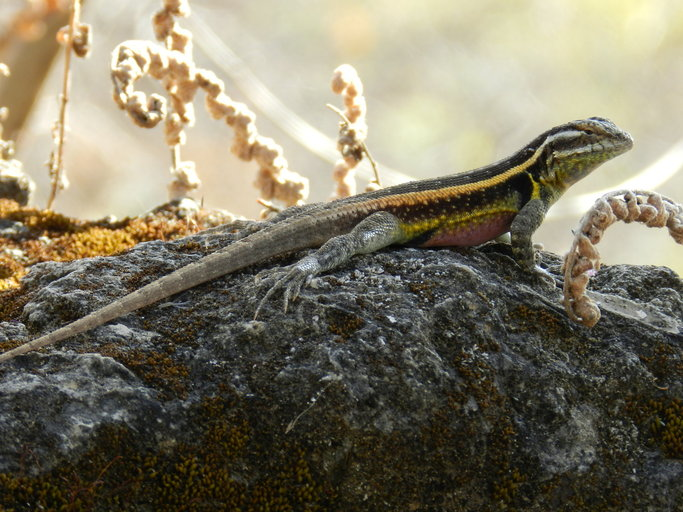
Spiny lizard (S. smithi)

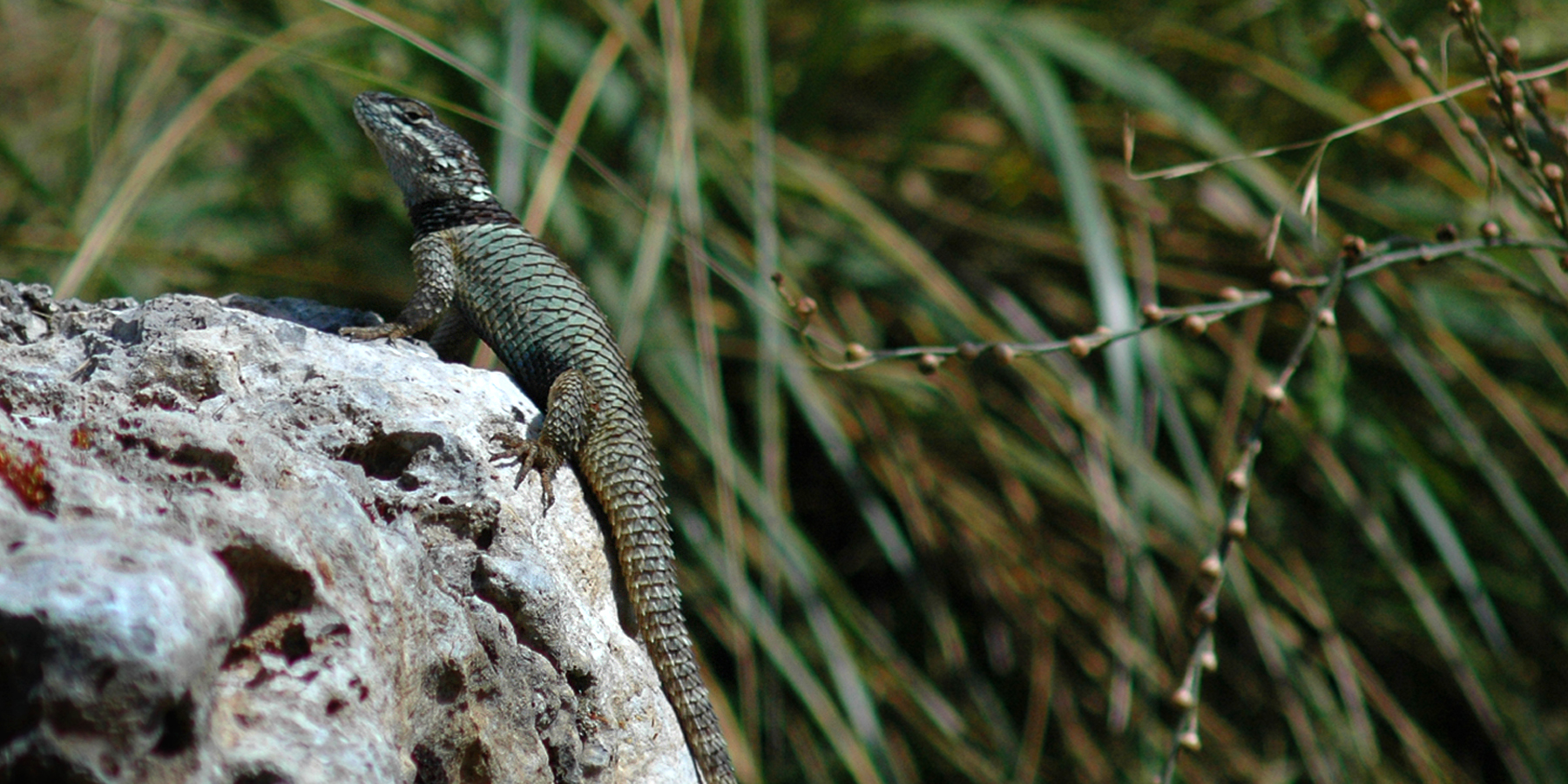
Torquate lizard (S. mikeprestoni)

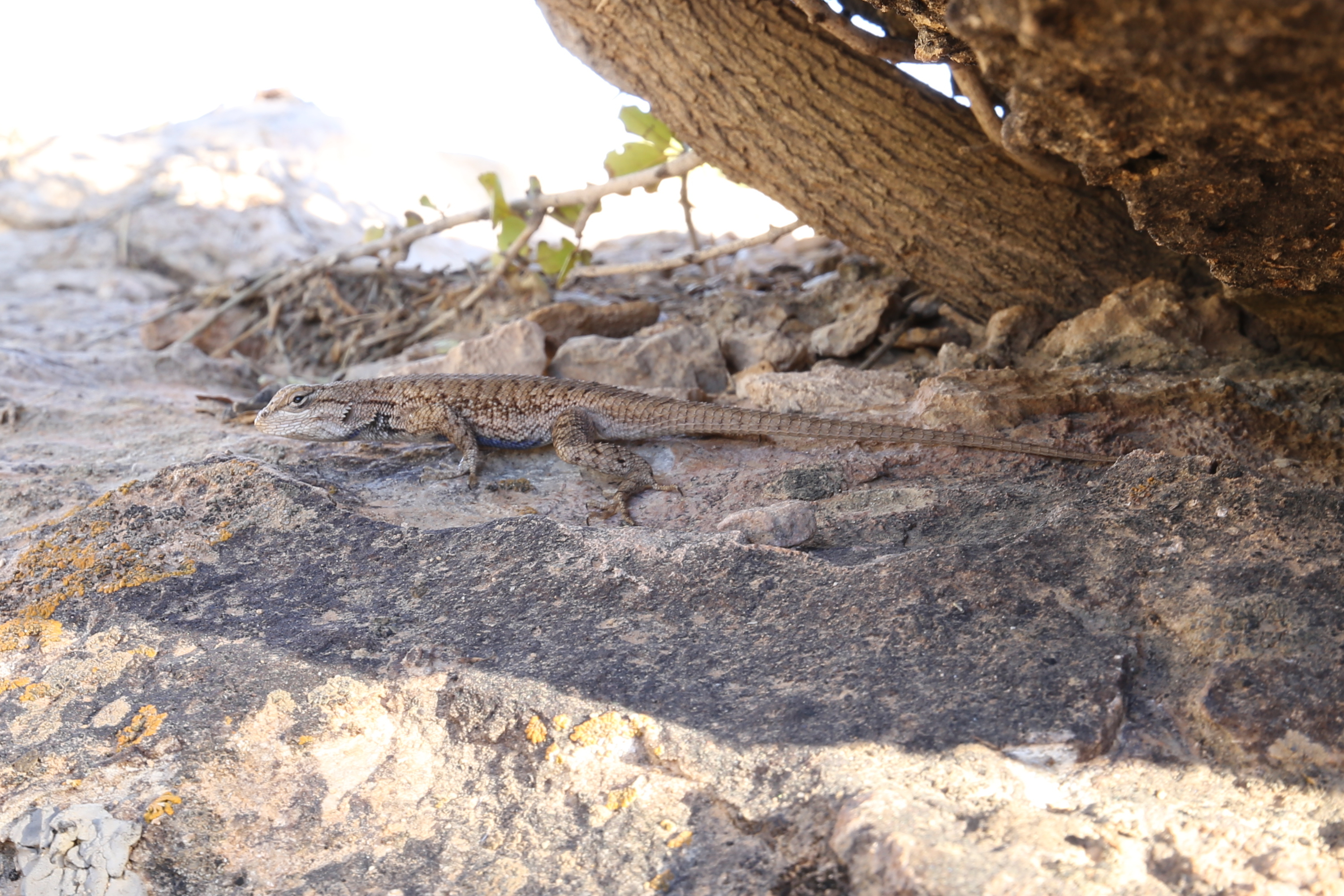
Plateau fence lizard (S. tristichus)

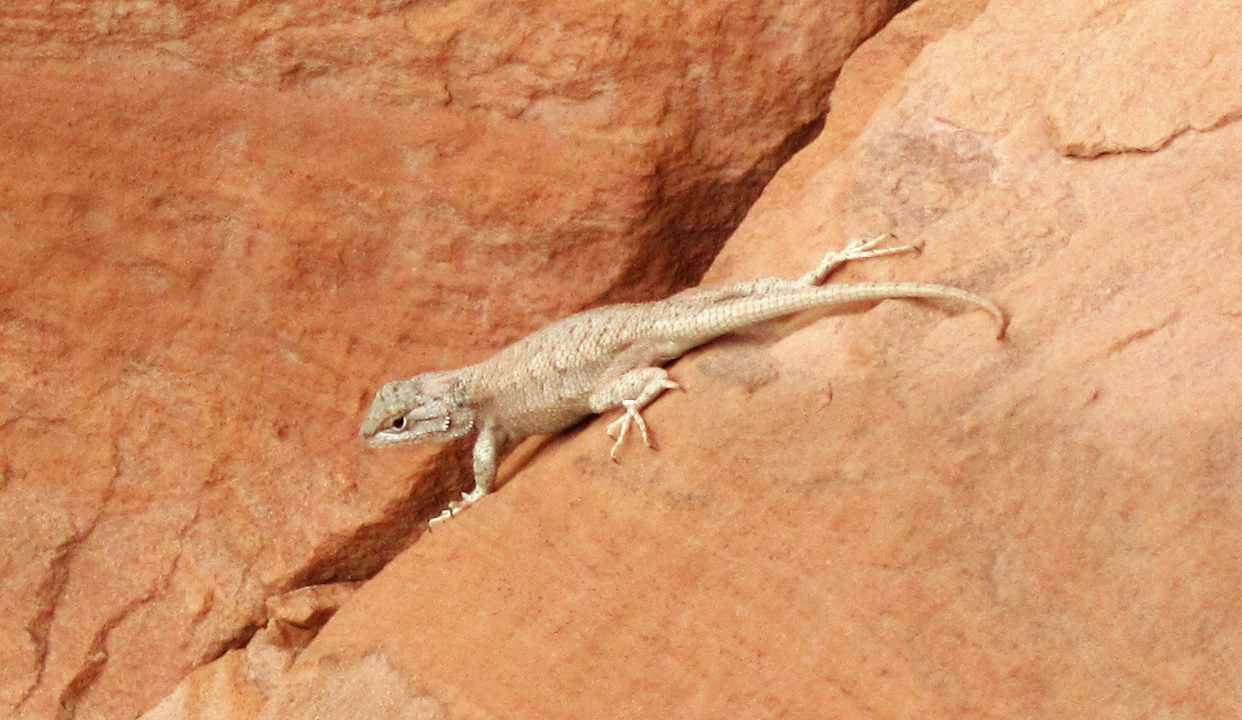
Plateau fence lizard (S. tristichus)

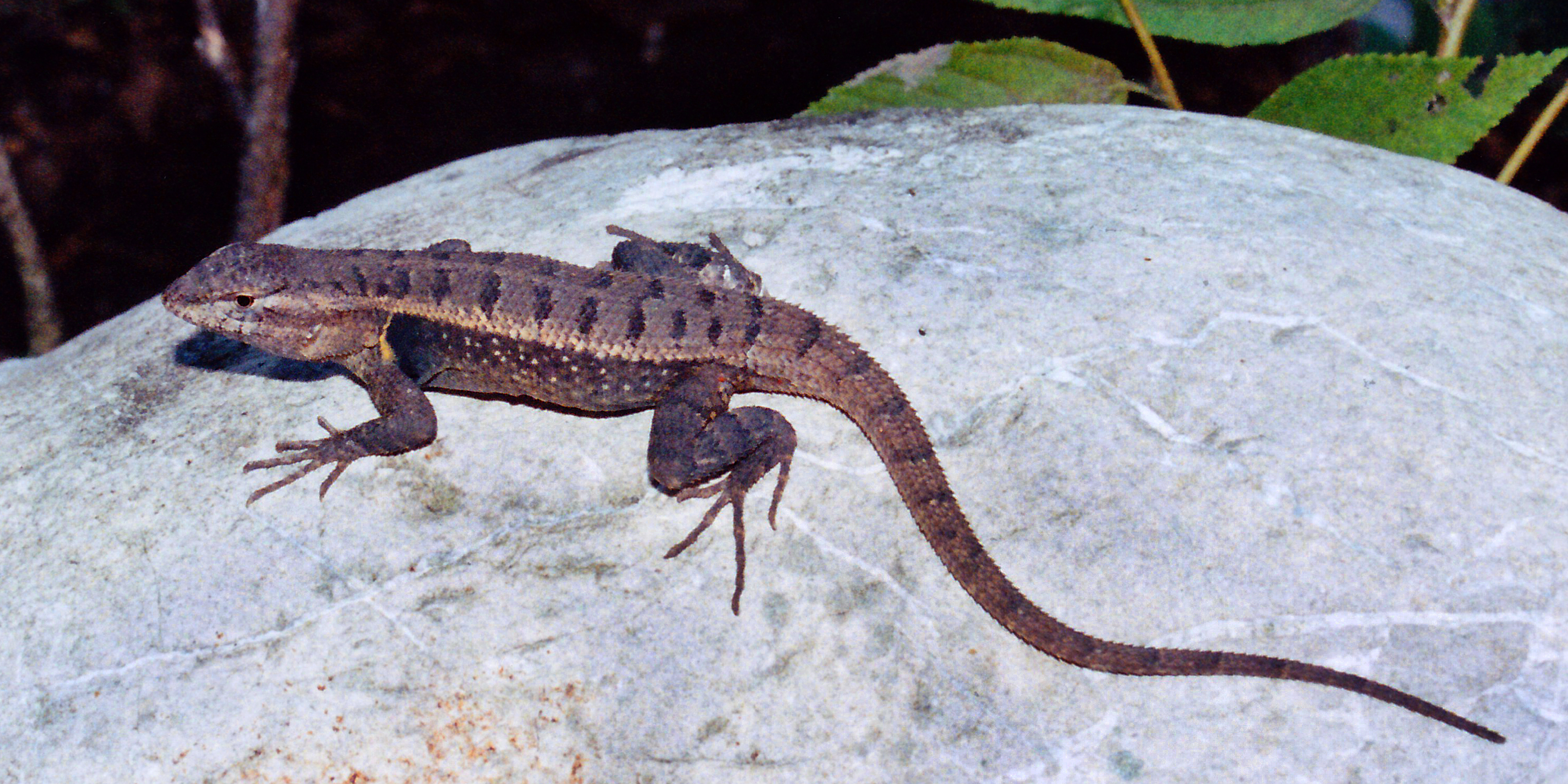
Rose-bellied Lizard (S. variabilis)

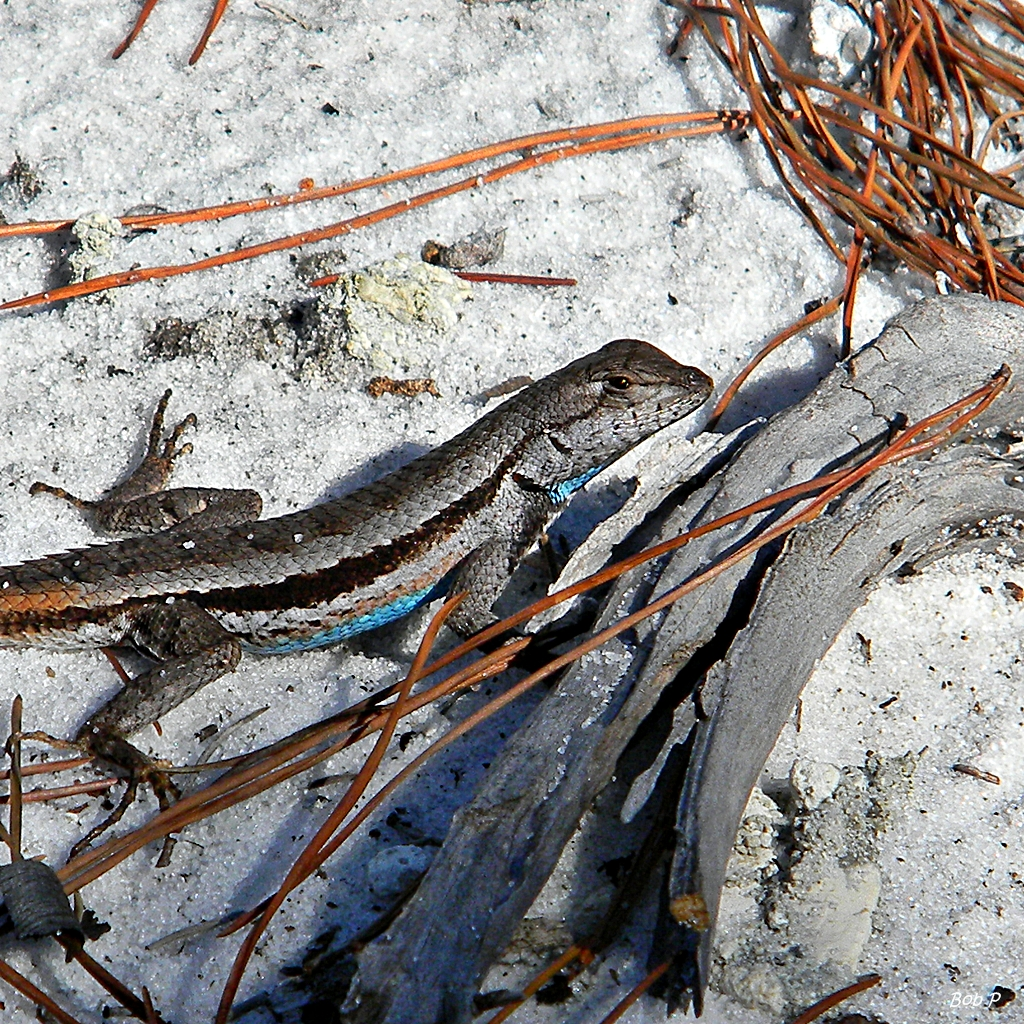
Florida scrub lizard (S. woodi)

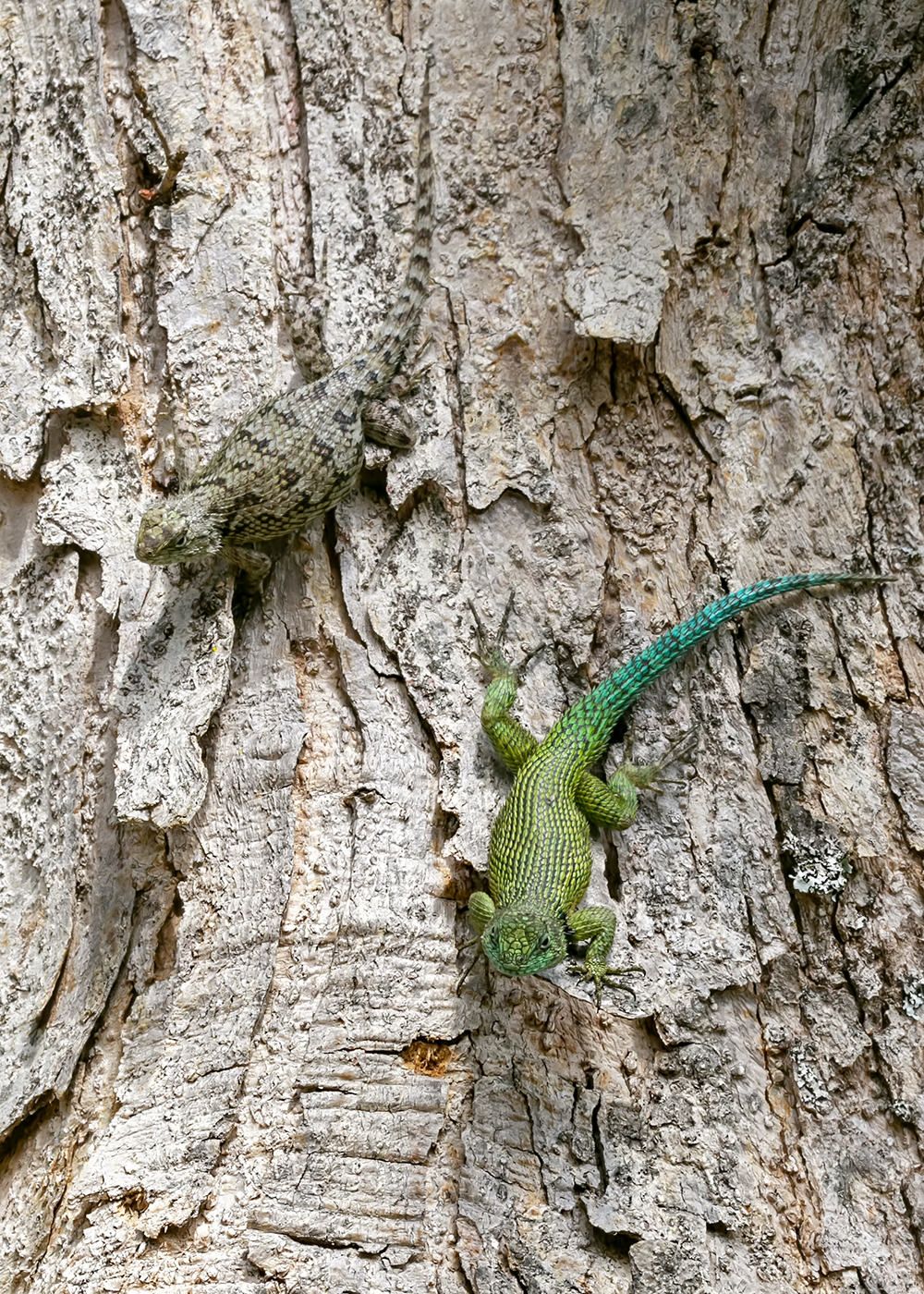
Green spiny lizard (S. malachiticus)

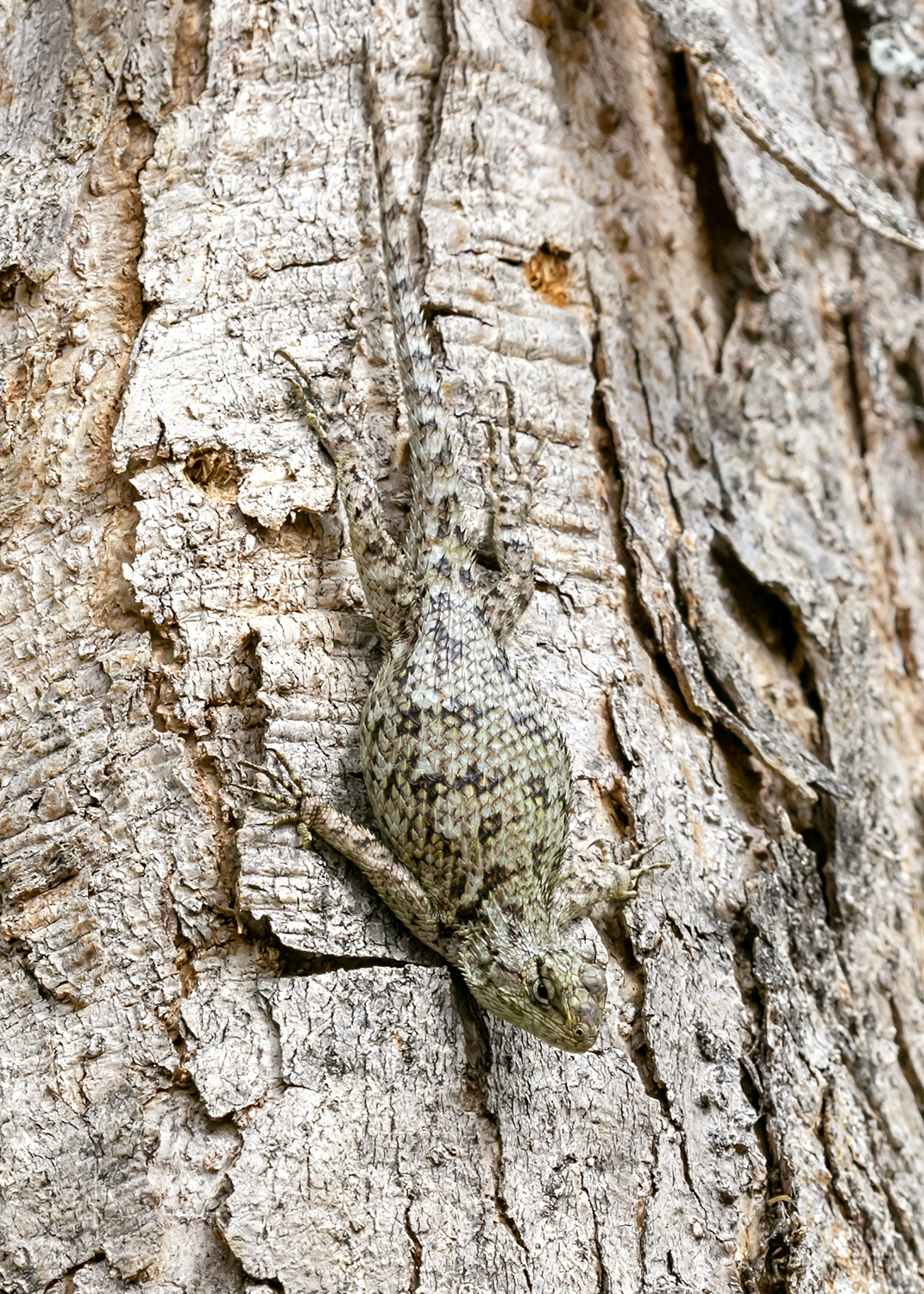
Green spiny lizard (S. malachiticus)

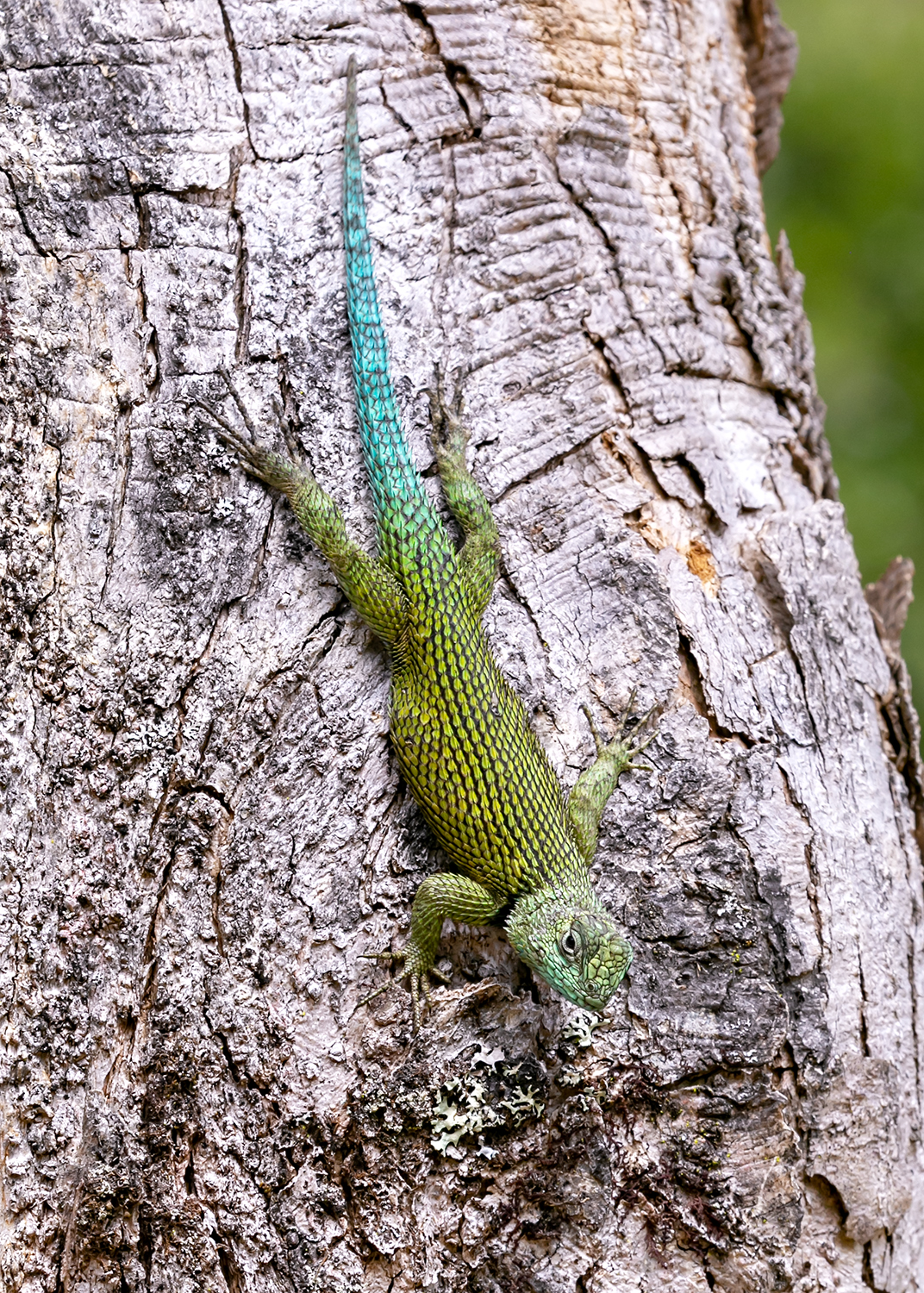
Green spiny lizard (S. malachiticus)

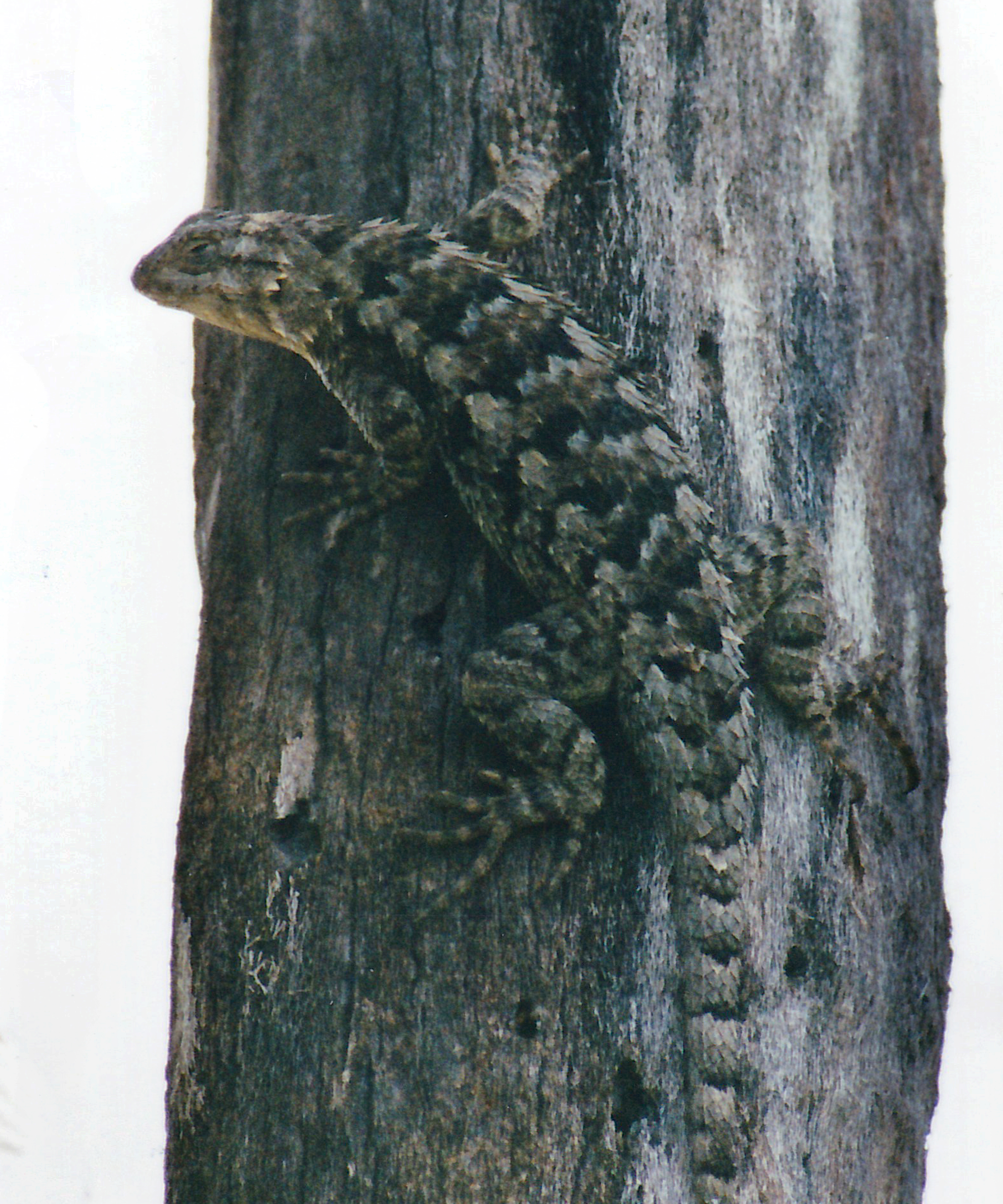
Eastern spiny lizard (S. spinosus)

== See also ==
- Moloch horridus, an unrelated Australian lizard that is sometimes also referred to as "spiny lizard"
