= Sceloporus gadsdeni =

Scientific classification
- Domain: Eukaryota
- Kingdom: Animalia
- Phylum: Chordata
- Class: Reptilia
- Order: Squamata
- Suborder: Iguania
- Family: Phrynosomatidae
- Genus: Sceloporus
- Species: S. gadsdeni

Binomial name
- Sceloporus gadsdeni Castañeda-Gaytán & Díaz-Cárdenas, 2017

Species of lizard

Sceloporus gadsdeni, the lagoon spiny lizard, is a species of lizard in the family Phrynosomatidae. It is endemic to Mexico.
