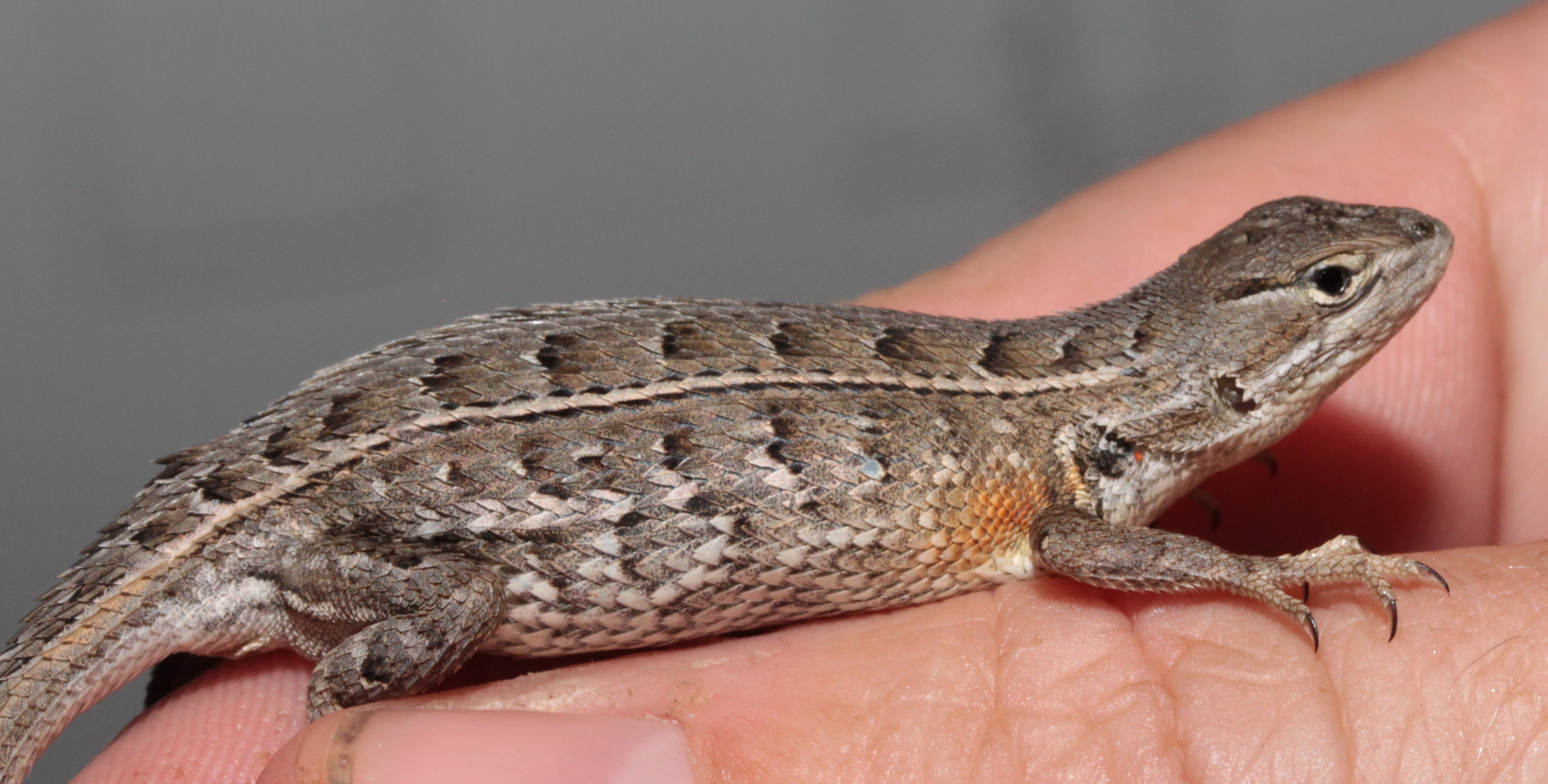
- female

Conservation status
- Least Concern (IUCN 3.1)

Scientific classification
- Kingdom: Animalia
- Phylum: Chordata
- Class: Reptilia
- Order: Squamata
- Suborder: Iguania
- Family: Phrynosomatidae
- Genus: Sceloporus
- Species: S. samcolemani

Binomial name
- Sceloporus samcolemani H.M. Smith & Hall, 1974

Synonyms
- Sceloporus scalaris samcolemani H.M. Smith & Hall, 1974; Sceloporus samcolemani — Watkins-Colewell et al., 1998

= Sceloporus samcolemani =

Species of lizard

Sceloporus samcolemani, also known commonly as Coleman's bunchgrass lizard, Coleman's bunch grass lizard, and lagartija de Coleman in Spanish, is a species of lizard in the family Phrynosomatidae. The species is endemic to Mexico.

== Etymology ==
The specific name, samcolemani, is in honor of Sam Coleman who aided Hobart Smith in his research by writing data-processing programs.

== Geographic range ==
S. samcolemani is found in northern Sierra Madre Oriental of the states of Coahuila and Nuevo León.

== Habitat ==
The preferred natural habitat of S. samcolemani is forest, at altitudes of 2,100–3,300 m (6,900–10,800 ft).

== Reproduction ==
S. samcolemani is oviparous.
