= Sceloporus hondurensis =

Scientific classification
- Kingdom: Animalia
- Phylum: Chordata
- Class: Reptilia
- Order: Squamata
- Suborder: Iguania
- Family: Phrynosomatidae
- Genus: Sceloporus
- Species: S. hondurensis

Binomial name
- Sceloporus hondurensis McCranie, 2018

Species of lizard

Sceloporus hondurensis, the Honduran spiny lizard, is a species of lizard in the family Phrynosomatidae. It is endemic to Honduras.
