= Sceloporus subniger =

Scientific classification
- Domain: Eukaryota
- Kingdom: Animalia
- Phylum: Chordata
- Class: Reptilia
- Order: Squamata
- Suborder: Iguania
- Family: Phrynosomatidae
- Genus: Sceloporus
- Species: S. subniger

Binomial name
- Sceloporus subniger Poglayen & H.M. Smith, 1958

Species of lizard

Sceloporus subniger, the Tolucan bunchgrass lizard or plateau bunchgrass lizard, is a species of lizard in the family Phrynosomatidae. It is endemic to Mexico.
