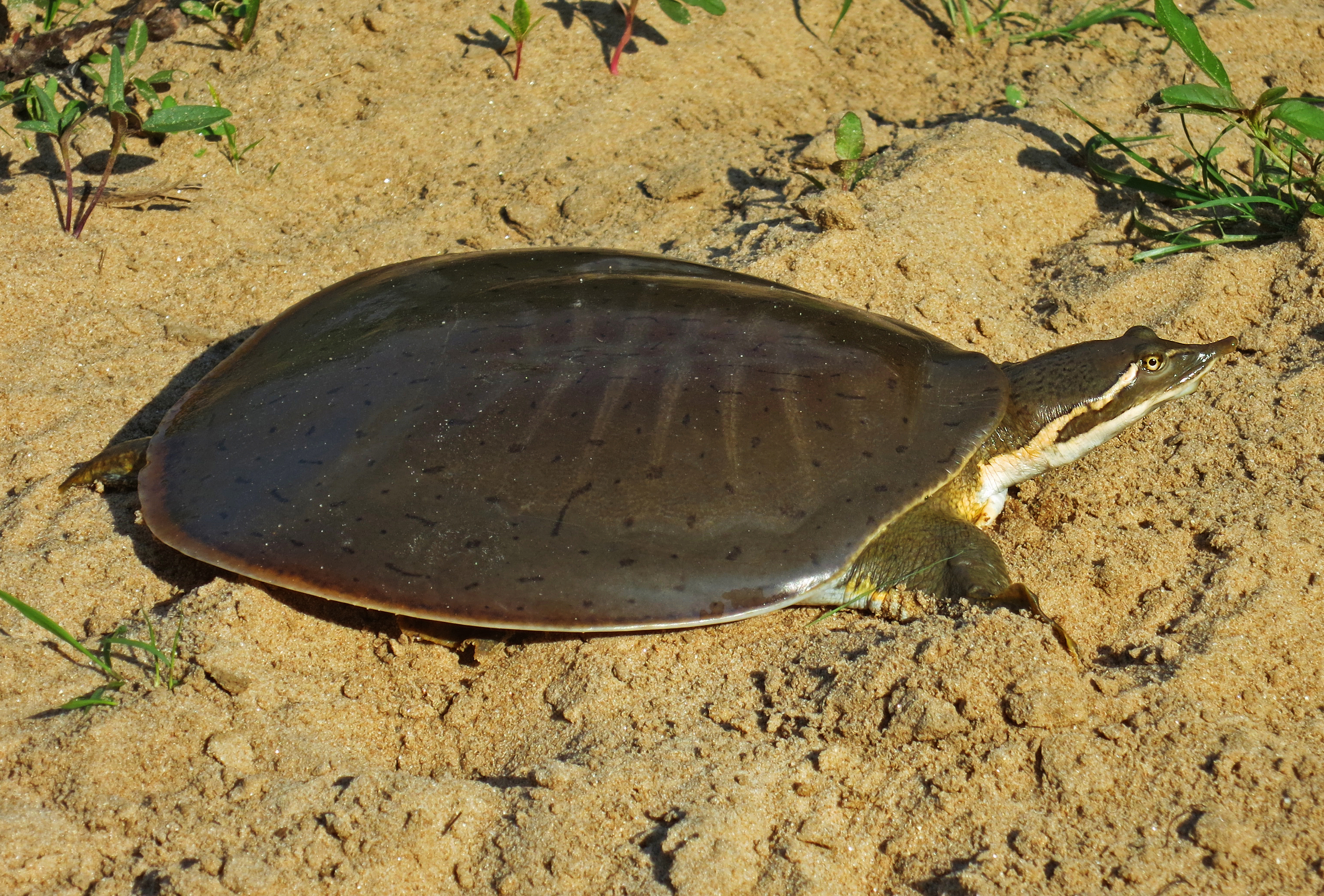

Conservation status
- Least Concern (IUCN 3.1)

Scientific classification
- Kingdom: Animalia
- Phylum: Chordata
- Class: Reptilia
- Order: Testudines
- Suborder: Cryptodira
- Family: Trionychidae
- Genus: Apalone
- Species: A. mutica

Binomial name
- Apalone mutica (Lesueur, 1827)
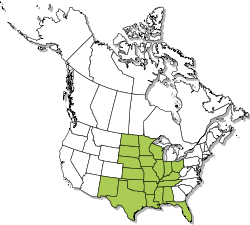
- States inhabited by the smooth softshell turtle
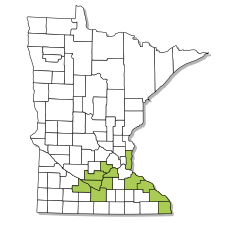
- Minnesota counties inhabited by the smooth softshell turtle

Synonyms
- Apalone mutica: Trionyx muticus Lesueur, 1827; Aspidonectes muticus — Wagler, 1830; Gymnopus muticus — A.M.C. Duméril, Bibron &A.H.A. Duméril, 1854; Amyda mutica — Agassiz, 1857; Trionyx muticus — Webb, 1959; Apolone mutica — Meylan, 1987; Apalone mutica mutica: Trionyx pusilla Rafinesque, 1822; Trionyx muticus Lesueur, 1827; Aspidonectes muticus — Wagler, 1830; Gymnopus muticus — A.M.C. Duméril, Bibron & A.H.A. Duméril, 1854; Amyda mutica — Agassiz, 1857; Potamochelys microcephalus Gray, 1864; Callinia microcephala — Gray, 1869; Potamochelys microcephala — Boulenger, 1889; Trionyx muticus muticus — Webb, 1959; Apalone mutica — Meylan, 1987; Apalone muticus — Meylan & Webb, 1988; Apalone mutica mutica — Ernst & R. Barbour, 1989; Apalone mutica mutica — Stubbs, 1989; Trionix muticus — Richard, 1999; Apalone mutica calvata: Trionyx pusilla Rafinesque, 1822 (nomen suppressum); Trionyx muticus calvatus Webb, 1959; Apalone mutica calvata — Ernst & R. Barbour, 1989; Apalone mutica calvata — Stubbs, 1989

= Smooth softshell turtle =

Species of turtle

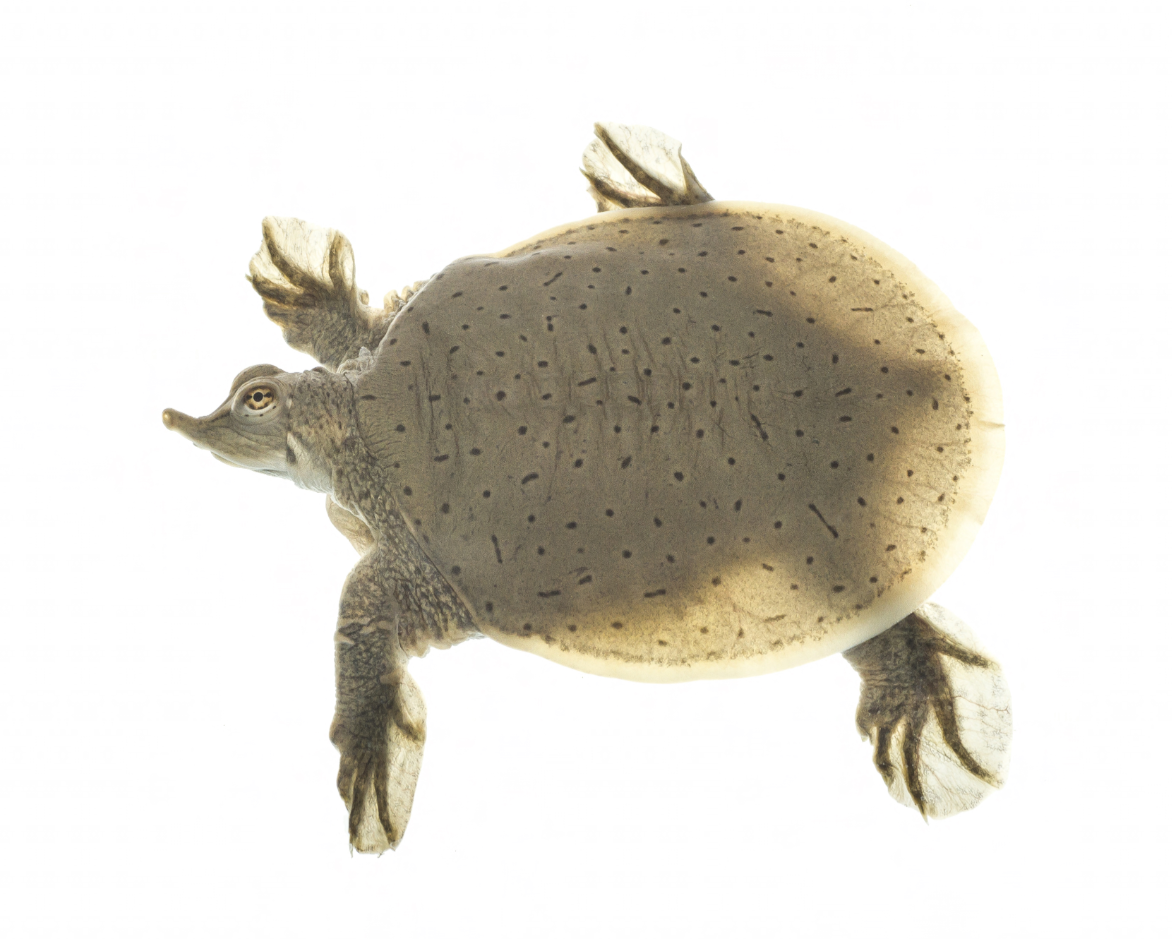
Juvenile at Gavins Point National Fish Hatchery in Yankton, South Dakota.

The smooth softshell turtle (Apalone mutica) is a species of North American softshell turtle in the family Trionychidae. This freshwater species is endemic to the United States, where it inhabits the Mississippi River system, along with other adjoining waterways that empty into the Gulf of Mexico.

== Distribution ==
Apalone mutica is native to the United States, where it is distributed throughout the central and south-central states. Its natural geographic range extends from western Pennsylvania in the east to New Mexico in the west, as far north as the Dakotas, and south to the westernmost Florida Panhandle, where it is eventually replaced by the Florida softshell turtle (Apalone ferox).

Smooth softshell turtles are common within the Mississippi River system, from its delta in Louisiana up to North Dakota, as well as in the Colorado River (in Texas), the Brazos, Sabine, Pearl, Alabama and the Conecuh (Escambia) river systems.

== Subspecies ==
Two subspecies are recognized, including the nominotypical subspecies.

Subspecies	Common name	Distribution
Apalone mutica calvata (Webb, 1959)	midland smooth softshell turtle	Throughout the central United States, in and around the Mississippi River.
Apalone mutica mutica (Lesueur, 1827)	Gulf Coast smooth softshell turtle	From Louisiana east to the panhandle of Florida.

Nota bene: A trinomial authority in parentheses indicates that the subspecies was originally described in a genus other than Apalone.

== Habitat ==
Both subspecies of Apalone mutica are typically found in medium to large, unpolluted fresh waterways, with moderate to fast currents; even in rivers with fast flow, they will swim directly to the sandy bottom and bury themselves, leaving only their nose or eyes exposed as they wait to ambush quickly-passing fish or amphibians. However, they are also found in standing or still bodies of water, like lakes, vernal pools, swamps and marshes. They may also be seen in some canals, reservoirs, or man-made ponds. They prefer water with fine sand or silty, mud bottoms, without heavy boulders, gravel or dense aquatic vegetation. Sandbanks must also be present, as the turtles can be seen sunning themselves for warmth.

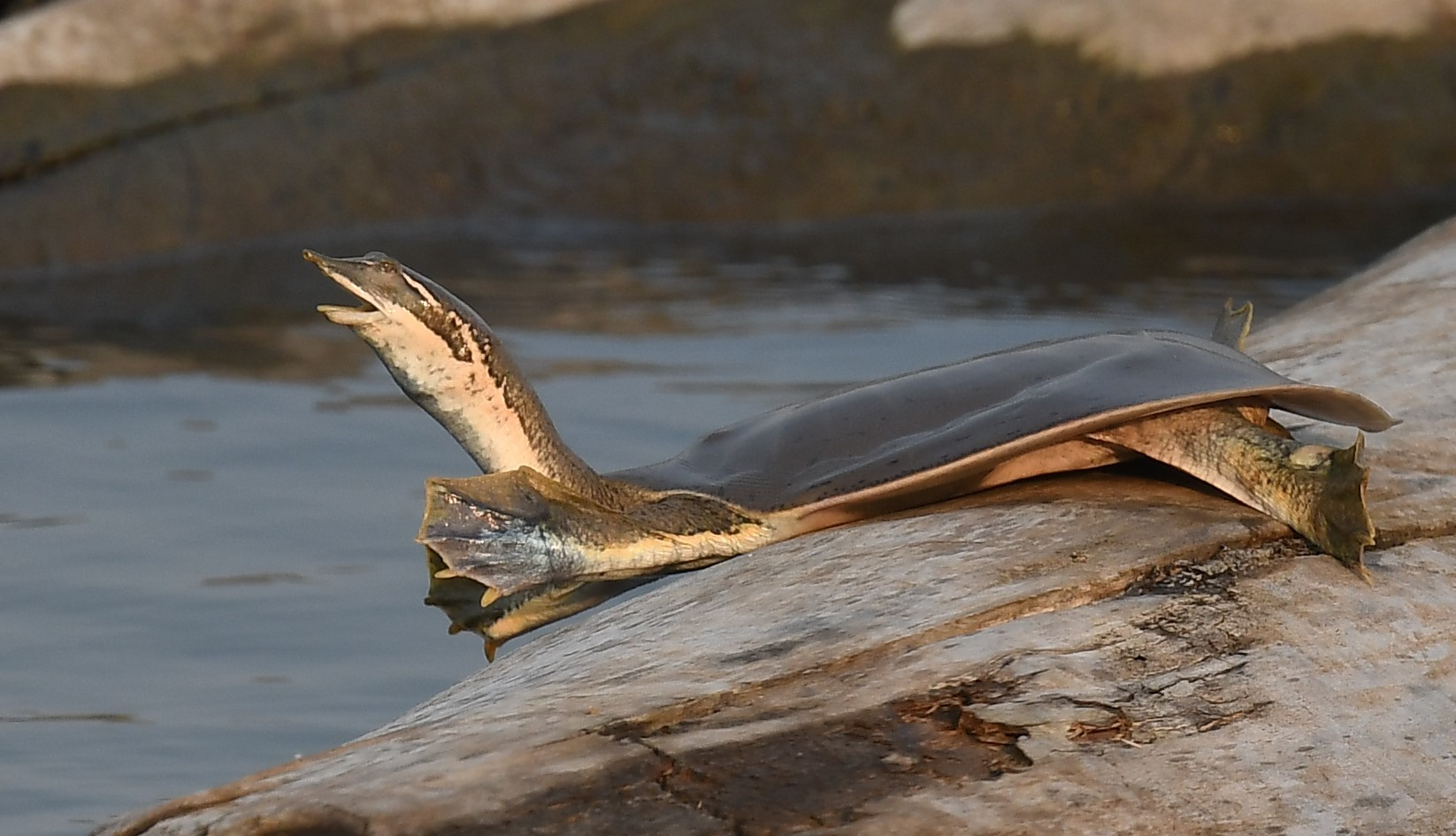
A. m. mutica basking, Missouri

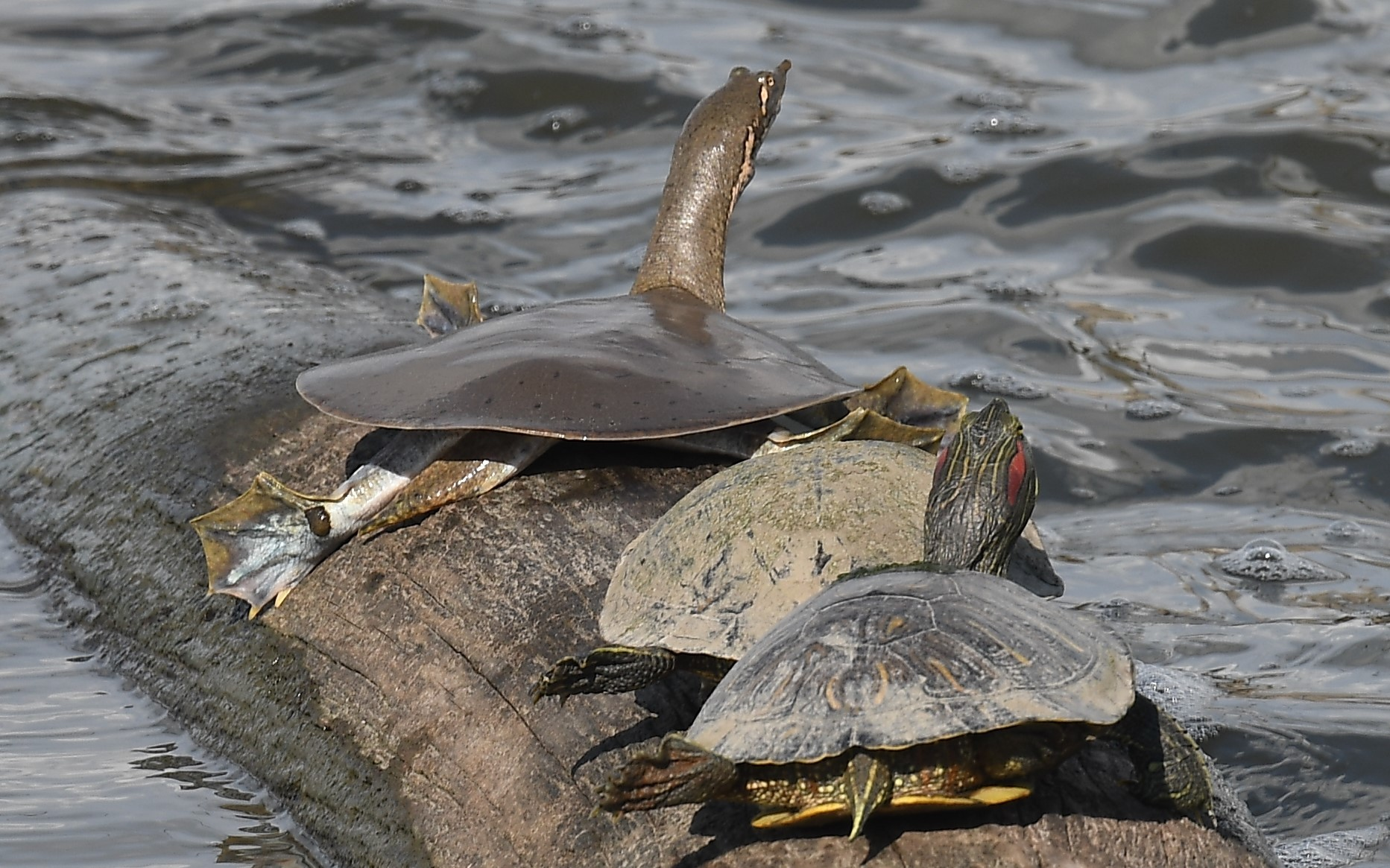
A. m. mutica basking with red-eared sliders, Missouri

== Description ==
The smooth softshell turtle has an anapsid skull, a type of skull structure that was present among the earliest groups of prehistoric reptiles (and retained by turtles today). Primarily, an anapsid skull lacks openings behind the orbits (as opposed to the synapsid or therapsid skull).

The smooth softshell turtle, as with all softshells, has a smooth, fairly soft, flexible, leather-like carapace that is covered by "skin", as opposed to the hard scutes commonly associated with most turtle species. The plastron is light white or gray, with no notable markings (other than occasional spotting), and its internal anatomy (bones, some organs) may be visible, as it lacks the typically hard shells of other aquatic turtles. It has a tubular snout with round nostrils, sometimes compared to a "pig" nose.

== Sexual dimorphism ==
There is sexual dimorphism between females and males of Apalone mutica as females are larger than males. A female has a carapace length of 16.5–35.6 cm (6.5–14.0 in) compared to a carapace length of 11.4–17.8 cm (4.5–7.0 in) for males. Additionally, the female smooth softshell turtle is usually brown or olive-colored with irregular dark brown blotches, while the carapace of males and juveniles is a brown or grayish color with dark dots or dashes. Sexual dimorphism is also apparent in the size of the tails and claws. Males have thicker tails than females, but females have longer hind claws than males.

== Similar species ==
The smooth softshell turtle may be easily confused with the spiny softshell turtle (Apalone spinifera), as the differences between the two species are subtle. The spiny softshell turtle has a rough carapace with spines along the front edge while, as the name implies, the smooth softshell turtle lacks such spines. Additionally, the white chin and throat of the smooth softshell are unmarked, compared to the splotchy chin and throat of the spiny softshell. A. mutica is the only species of North American softshell with round nostrils; all other species have ridges on the nasal septum which make the nostrils C-shaped.

== Diet ==
The smooth softshell turtle is mostly carnivorous, eating aquatic & larval insects, crayfish, other arthropods, molluscs, worms, fish and amphibians. Although primarily carnivorous, it sometimes resorts to eating vegetation such as algae, vegetables, fruits, and nuts.

== Reproduction ==
Breeding of the smooth softshell turtle occurs from April to June. The mating system utilized by these turtles is polygyny, meaning that males will mate with more than one female. Males actively seek out females by approaching other adults. If the other party is male or a non-receptive female, aggression may be displayed. However, if the other party is a receptive female, she remains passive to the advancements of the males. Copulation usually occurs in deep pools as the male mounts the female. The nesting period is usually from May to July as females only lay eggs once a year. During this period, adult females of A. mutica lay clutches of 3 to 28 eggs not more than 100 m (330 ft) from water in sandy areas. Eggs generally hatch 8 to 12 weeks later with the highest frequency of hatching being between August and September. Hatchlings average a weight of 5.4 g (0.19 oz) and have a carapace length of 4 cm (1.6 in). Male smooth softshell turtles become sexually mature during their fourth year and females become sexually mature during their ninth year.

Female turtles offer prenatal care for their offspring. They produce high levels of non-polar lipids that provide energy for their growing embryos. This energy is more than enough to keep the embryos alive. The high concentration of lipids also offer an advantage at birth as it acts as a food source until they hatchlings become mature enough to commence feeding. This type of care is also known as parental investment in embryogenesis. However, after hatching no physical parental care is given.

== Life history ==
The smooth softshell turtle is the most aquatic of the softshell turtles as it is often referred to as a "swimmer". It is able to stay underwater for extended periods of time due to its long neck and tubular snout. It often buries itself in the sand substrate at the bottom of a river or pool just deep enough so that its snout barely reaches the surface. Additionally, the skin covering the shell allows for a high rate of gas exchange. This enables the turtle to stay submerged for a long period of time. In this position, it often waits for prey to pass and utilizes its long neck to capture the prey.

The smooth softshell turtle hibernates in the months of October to March. It hibernates by burying itself in substrate underwater. After emerging from hibernation, it is often found on land basking in the sun. Given that its shell is a soft shell, it is unable to stay in the sun for extended periods of time. When basking, it is wary of its surroundings, and if any threat presents itself, it is quick to abandon its basking site to seek safety. Its agility on land and water makes it a difficult prey item for predators such as raccoons, humans, alligators and snapping turtles. It seeks shelter from these threats by diving and concealing itself in mud.

== Conservation status ==
Currently, the smooth softshell turtle is considered a species of least conservation concern. However, the species is still facing some wide-ranged threats. These threats include habitat degradation, harvesting for food, and an increase in human disturbances at nesting sites. Additionally, due to its skin's high rate of gas exchange, it is very susceptible to polluted waters. As a result of all of these factors, the smooth softshell turtle has been listed as a species of special concern in Minnesota and Wisconsin.

== Sympatric species ==
Apalone mutica is sympatric with the spiny softshell turtle (Apalone spinifera) over much of its range.

== Predation ==
Humans and American alligators are the main predators of adults. Hatchlings are eaten by fish, other turtles (such as common snapping turtles, alligator snapping turtles, possibly adult Apalone), water snakes (Nerodia), shoreline birds, bald eagles and other mammals. Nests are usually predated by raccoons, skunks (Mephitis and Spilogale), crows, fire ants (Solenopsis invicta), fly larvae (Sarcophagidae), domestic dogs, red foxes, eastern moles and other small mammals.
