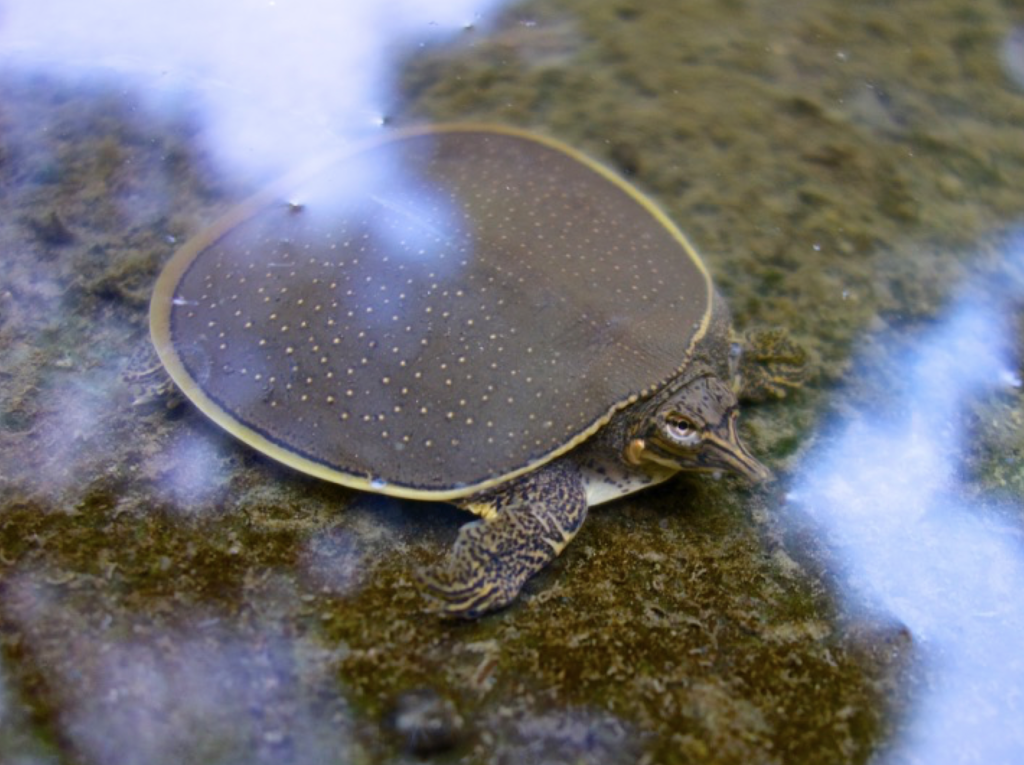

- Apparently Secure (NatureServe)

Scientific classification
- Domain: Eukaryota
- Kingdom: Animalia
- Phylum: Chordata
- Class: Reptilia
- Order: Testudines
- Suborder: Cryptodira
- Family: Trionychidae
- Genus: Apalone
- Species: A. spinifera
- Subspecies: A. s. guadalupensis

Trinomial name
- Apalone spinifera guadalupensis (Webb, 1962)

Synonyms
- Trionyx spinifer guadalupensis Webb, 1962; Trionyx spiniferus guadelupensis Pritchard, 1967 (ex errore); Trionyx spiniferus guadalupensis Webb, 1973; Apalone spinifera guadalupensis Ernst & Barbour, 1989; Apalone spinifera guadalupensis Stubbs, 1989; Apalone spinifera guadelupensis Joseph-Ouni, 2004

= Guadalupe spiny softshell turtle =

Subspecies of turtle

The Guadalupe spiny softshell turtle (Apalone spinifera guadalupensis) is a subspecies of soft-shelled turtle native to the United States, in the state of Texas. Their range is limited only to the Nueces and Guadalupe rivers, and their immediate tributaries.
