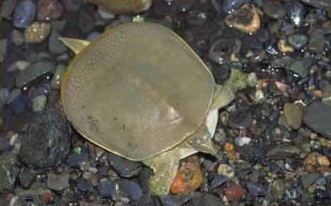

Conservation status
- Critically Endangered (IUCN 2.3)
- CITES Appendix I

Scientific classification
- Kingdom: Animalia
- Phylum: Chordata
- Class: Reptilia
- Order: Testudines
- Suborder: Cryptodira
- Family: Trionychidae
- Genus: Apalone
- Species: A. spinifera
- Subspecies: A. s. atra

Trinomial name
- Apalone spinifera atra (Webb & Legler, 1960)

Synonyms
- Trionyx ater Webb & Legler, 1960; Trionyx spinifer ater — Morafka, 1977; Trionyx spiniferus ater — Smith & Smith, 1980; Apalone spinifera ater — Groombridge, 1988; Apalone ater — David, 1994; Trionys spiniferus ater — Obst, 1996; Apalone spiniferus ater — Ferri, 2002; Apalone spinifera atra — Artner, 2003; Apalone (Apalone) atra — Vetter, 2004

= Cuatro Cienegas softshell =

Cuatro Ciénegas softshell

Subspecies of turtle

The Cuatro Ciénegas softshell (Apalone spinifera atra), also called the black spiny softshell, is a subspecies of the spiny softshell turtle in the family Trionychidae. It is found only in the Cuatro Ciénegas Basin in the Mexican state of Coahuila and it is considered critically endangered by the IUCN. The subspecies, along with its parent species, was formerly classified in the genus Trionyx.

== Bibliography ==
- Rhodin, Anders G.J.; van Dijk, Peter Paul; Inverson, John B.; Shaffer, H. Bradley; Roger, Bour (31 December 2011). "Turtles of the world, 2011 update: Annotated checklist of taxonomy, synonymy, distribution and conservation status" (PDF). Chelonian Research Monographs. 5. Archived from the original (PDF) on 31 January 2012.
- Fritz, Uwe; Havaš, Peter (2007). "Checklist of Chelonians of the World". Vertebrate Zoology. 57 (2): 149–368. doi:10.3897/vz.57.e30895. S2CID 87809001.
- Webb RG, Legler JM (1960). "A New Softshell Turtle (Genus Trionyx) from Coahuila, Mexico". Univ. Kansas Sci. Bull. 40 (2): 21–30. (Trionyx ater, new species).
