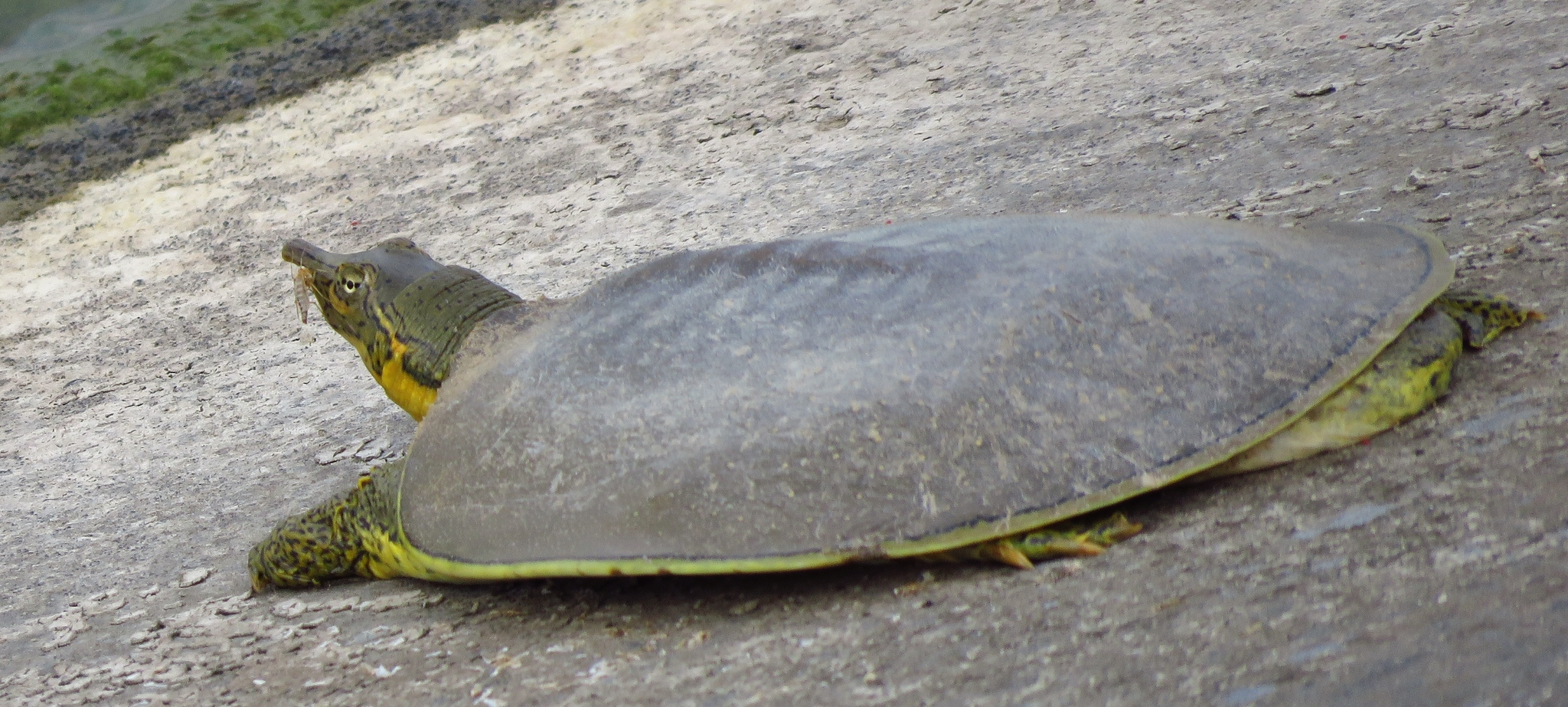

Conservation status
- Apparently Secure (NatureServe)

Scientific classification
- Domain: Eukaryota
- Kingdom: Animalia
- Phylum: Chordata
- Class: Reptilia
- Order: Testudines
- Suborder: Cryptodira
- Family: Trionychidae
- Genus: Apalone
- Species: A. spinifera
- Subspecies: A. s. pallida

Trinomial name
- Apalone spinifera pallida (Webb, 1962)

Synonyms
- Trionyx spinifer pallidus Webb, 1962; Trionyx pallidus Pritchard, 1967; Trionyx spiniferus pallidus Pritchard, 1967; Apalone spinifera pallida Ernst & Barbour, 1989; Apalone spinifera pallidus Stubbs, 1989

= Pallid spiny softshell turtle =

Subspecies of turtle

The pallid spiny softshell turtle (Apalone spinifera pallida) is a subspecies of spiny softshell turtle native to the U.S. states of Arkansas, Oklahoma, Louisiana and Texas. It was first described by Robert G. Webb in 1962.
