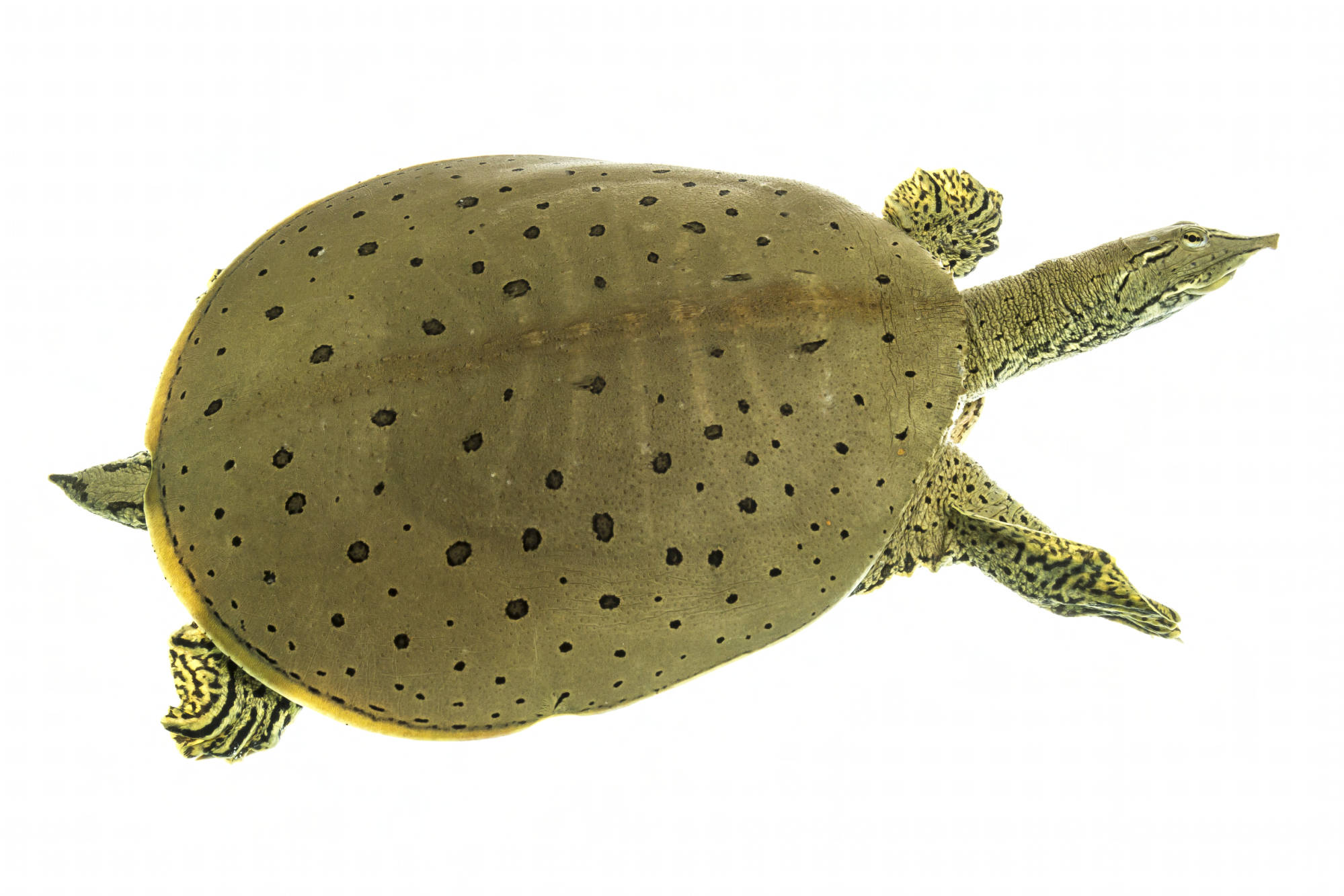

Conservation status
- Least Concern (IUCN 3.1)

Scientific classification
- Kingdom: Animalia
- Phylum: Chordata
- Class: Reptilia
- Order: Testudines
- Suborder: Cryptodira
- Family: Trionychidae
- Genus: Apalone
- Species: A. spinifera

Binomial name
- Apalone spinifera (Lesueur, 1827)

Subspecies
- Northern spiny softshell turtle (A. s. spinifera); Gulf Coast spiny softshell turtle (A. s. aspera); Black spiny softshell turtle (A. s. atra); Texas spiny softshell turtle (A. s. emoryi); Guadalupe spiny softshell turtle (A. s. guadalupensis); Pallid spiny softshell turtle (A. s. pallida)

Synonyms
- Apalone spinifera spinifera: Trionyx nasica Rafinesque, 1822 (nomen suppressum); Trionyx spiniferus Lesueur, 1827; Apalone hudsonica Rafinesque, 1832; Gymnopus spiniferus — A.M.C. Duméril & Bibron, 1835; Trionyx annulifer Wied, 1839; Tyrse argus Gray, 1844; Trionyx annulatus Gray, 1856; Trionyx argus — Gray, 1856; Gymnopodus spiniferus — A.H.A. Duméril, 1856; Aspidonectes nuchalis Agassiz, 1857; Aspidonectes spinifer — Agassiz, 1857; Gymnopus spinifer — Agassiz, 1857; Trionyx spinifer — Agassiz, 1857; Gymnopus olivaceus Wied, 1865; Callinia spicifera Gray, 1869; Callinia spinifera — Gray, 1870; Platypeltis nuchalis — Baur, 1893; Platypeltis spinifer — Baur, 1893; Tyrse spinifera — O.P. Hay, 1904; Amyda spinifera — O.P. Hay, 1905; Platypeltis spinifera — O.P. Hay, 1907; Amyda spinifer — Potter, 1920; Amyda spinifera spinifera — Stejneger & T. Barbour, 1939; Trionyx spinifera spinifera — Cagle, 1941; Amyda ferox spinifera — Neill, 1951; Trionyx ferox spinifera — Schmidt, 1953; Trionyx spinifer spinifer — Schwartz, 1956; Trionyx spiniferus spiniferus — Wermuth & Mertens, 1961; Apalone spinifera — Meylan, 1987; Apalone spiniferus — Meylan & Webb, 1988; Apalone spinifera spinifera — Ernst & R. Barbour, 1989; Apalone spinifera spinifera — Stubbs, 1989; Trionix spiniferus — Richard, 1999

= Spiny softshell turtle =

Species of turtle

The spiny softshell turtle (Apalone spinifera) is a species of softshell turtle, one of the largest freshwater turtle species in North America. Both the common name, spiny softshell, and the specific name, spinifera (spine-bearing), refer to the spiny, cone-like projections on the leading edge of the carapace, which are not scutes (scales).

== Description ==
The spiny softshell turtle's scientific name is very descriptive of the animal. Apalone comes from the Greek word apalos, meaning soft or tender, and spinifera is of Latin origin; spina- referring to thorn or spine and -ifer meaning bearing. This species is a member of the family Trionychidae, and one of the most distinguishing features of members in this family is the presence of a leathery, moderately flexible carapace. This is caused by loss of keratinized scutes and some bony tissue loss. Spiny softshell turtles have webbed feet, each with three claws. Another distinguishing feature of softshell turtles is the presence of a fleshy, elongated nose.

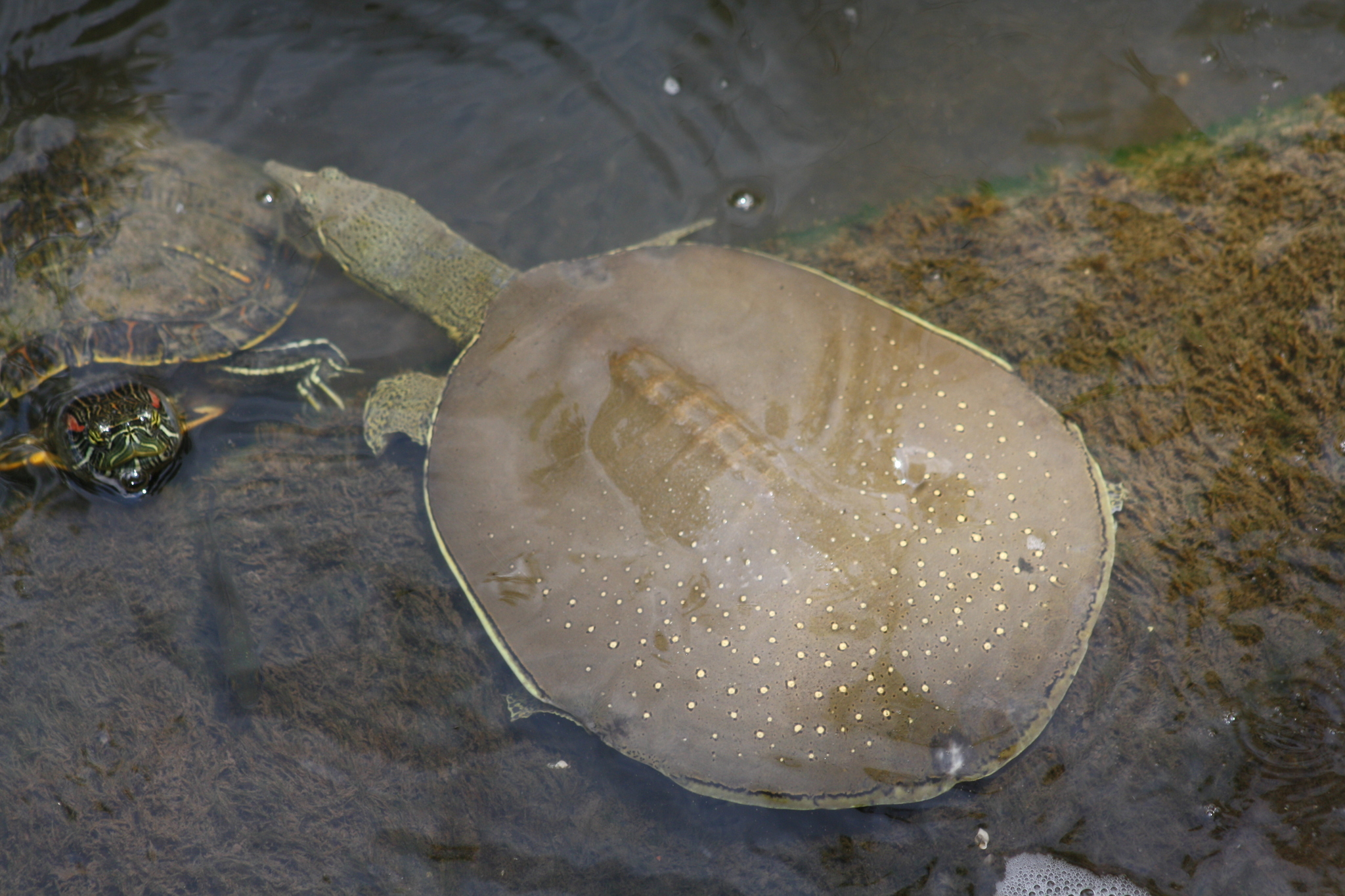
With a red eared slider, Texas

The carapace (the upper part of the shell) ranges from brown or yellow-brown to olive in color, while the plastron (lower part of the shell) is lighter, usually white or yellow and transparent, showing the underlying bones. Hatchlings usually have dark spots on the carapace, but as females age, they frequently become darker in color, or their carapace becomes splotched. Males tend to maintain the same coloration pattern from birth. Coloration also varies between each subspecies, and the exact coloration can also depend on an individual turtle's environment. Spiny softshell turtles are cryptically colored, meaning that their coloration helps them blend in with their surrounding environment.

Spiny softshell turtles also have pale lines bordered by black lines running from its head down the side of its neck. The carapace length ranges from 18 to 54 cm (7.1–21.3 in), with females growing larger than males. The namesake spines, also known as tubercles, are found along the anterior border of the carapace and are more commonly found in males. The variation in coloration, size, and spine presence indicates that this species exhibits sexual dimorphism.

A. spinifera has ridges on its nasal septum, making its nostrils c-shaped, unlike the nostrils of the similar species A. mutica which are round.

== Distribution ==
=== Geographic range ===
This species is the most widely distributed softshell turtle in North America. This could be due to habitat fragmentation caused by humans. The spiny softshell has a wide range, extending throughout much of the United States, as well as north into the Canadian provinces of Ontario and Quebec, and south into the Mexican states of Tamaulipas, Nuevo León, Coahuila, and Chihuahua. Recently, the spiny softshell has expanded its geographic range (through human assistance) into New Jersey, Massachusetts, New Hampshire, Washington, and California. They were also recently discovered in Lake Champlain, contrary to historical records.

=== Ecological range ===
Spiny softshell turtles are often referred to as aquatic habitat generalists, meaning they are found in a wide variety of aquatic settings. The spiny softshell can be found in bodies of fresh water, including ponds, lakes, rivers, tributaries, bayous, oxbows, and streams. They can persist in more urban environments, as they are well-adapted to periodic habitat disturbances. They inhabit shallow water less than 1 m (3 ft 3 in) deep, but can also be found as much as 10 m (33 ft) deep. When swimming, a study suggests that they get most of their thrusting power from their forelimbs as opposed to their hindlimbs, which is common in other species. They can be found in areas with varying levels of vegetation, and although they are generally found in more slow-moving waters, this species abundance is greatest in waters with higher visibility and slower water velocity Spiny softshells prefer waters with sandy bottoms and clean, sandy banks. Sandy environments are important for nesting sites, proper juvenile growth and development, and camouflage. Spiny softshells migrate between warm and cold seasons. In each season, turtles generally stay in a single zone, and they move more within their zone during warm months. During cold months, spiny softshell turtles tend to overwinter in tributaries, some even showing site fidelity and returning to the same tributaries the following year. The spiny softshell migrates between its zones and its average home range length is 10.8 km (6.7 mi).

As far as home range, a study of the "eastern spiny" subspecies (which has the largest and most northern-reaching distribution) home range behavior found that turtles of northern Lake Champlain generally had two annual concentration areas for spring-summer and fall-winter, contributing to a large home range. Mean annual home range was also found, in the same study, to be over 10 times larger for female softshells compared to males. This study suggested that the large home range was due to habitat fragmentation.

== Behavior ==
=== Diet ===
Spiny softshell turtles feed on a variety of food items. They are primary consumers and feed on invertebrates (crayfish and aquatic insects), fish, algal stocks and other plant material, and mussels. They are generally observed as benthic feeders; they can either actively hunt prey or bury themselves in the sand and wait to ambush prey.

Some evidence suggests that spiny softshell turtles exhibit a nuclear-follower foraging association with fish. A study that took place in an urban drainage canal in Louisiana found that when foraging, spiny softshell turtles were observed moving along the creek bottom thrusting their probosces into the substrate which then allowed fish to enter the suspended sediment and capture prey otherwise unavailable to the fish. The fish benefit from increased foraging success, while few benefits accrue to the foraging turtles.

=== Reproduction ===
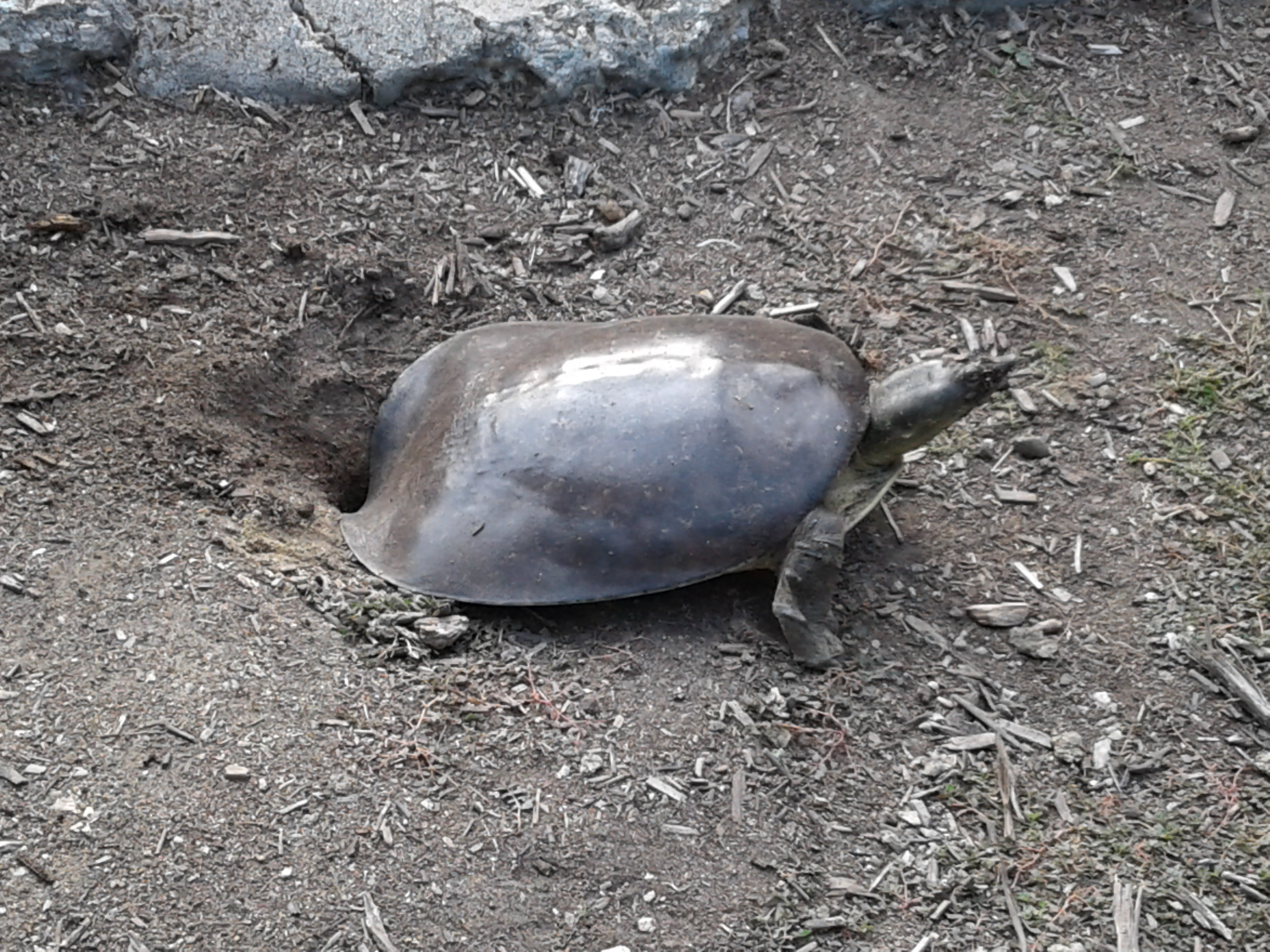
Laying eggs at Los Angeles' Baldwin Lake, a part of the species' non-native introduced range

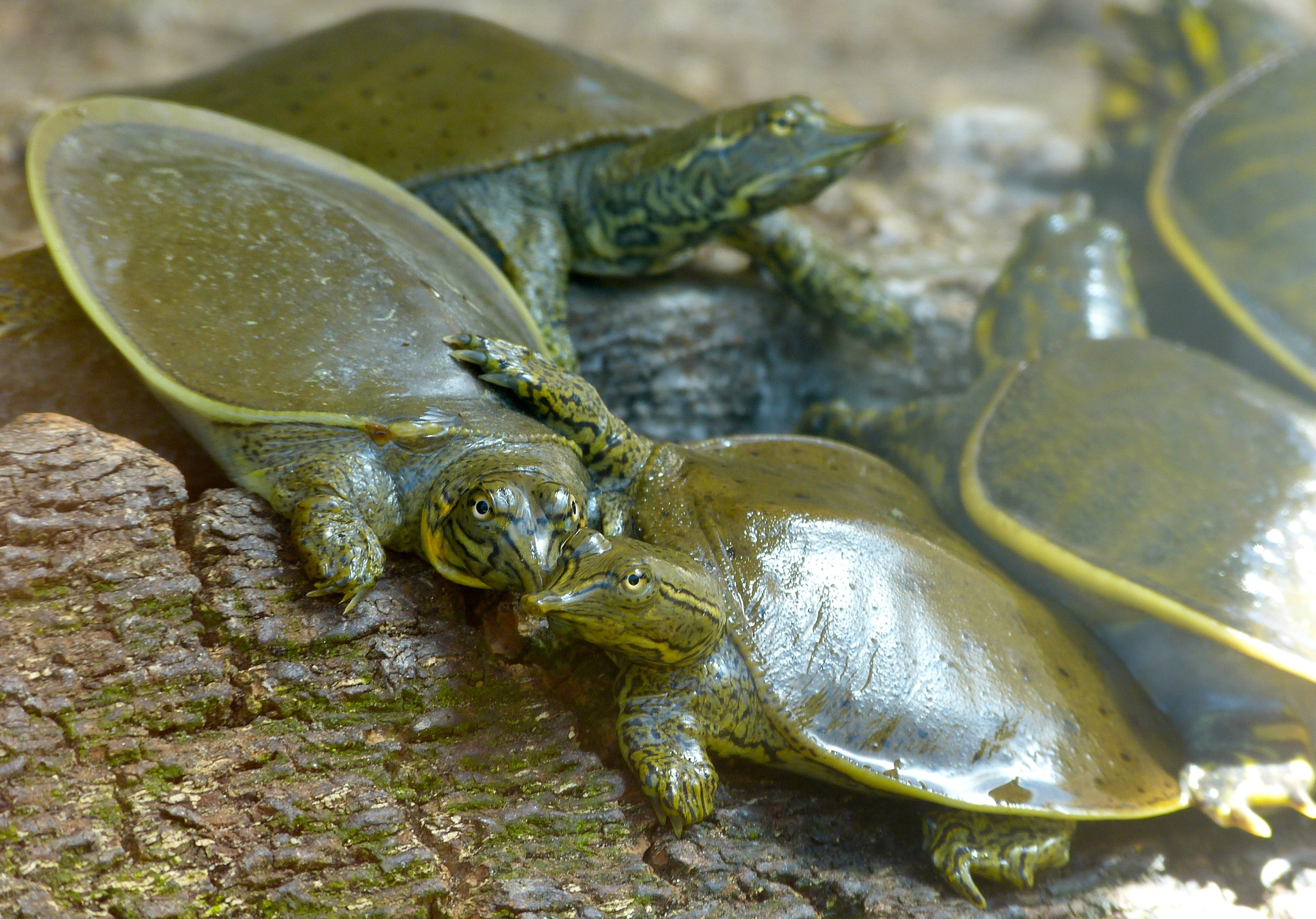
Juvenile spiny softshell turtles

Spiny softshells begin mating between ages 8 and 10. A large female turtle may live up to 50 years. The turtles mate in mid-to-late spring in deep water. The male will nudge the female's head while swimming and wave their feet in front of her face, and if she chooses to mate, the male will swim above the female without clasping her with his claws (unlike other turtles). Prior to nesting, the females have been observed to have a 3 stage activity pattern throughout the day. The females start the day by basking and moving around an area, then they spend a majority of their afternoon swimming in a new area, and finally they would stop and search for an ideal nesting spot. A few months later, the female turtle quickly lays her eggs along a sunny sandbar or gravel bank in a flask-shaped cavity she has dug close to the water. This nesting behavior typically begins around July with the females leaving the water and probing the ground with her snout to find the spot to lay her eggs. The turtle nests more than once during a single season. She can lay between 9 and 38 round, calcareous-shelled eggs. The eggs are laid around June and July, and they hatch in the late summer early fall, around September. Incubation lasts approximately 2-3 months. Larger bodied females have been found to lay a second clutch in late June or July. In studies observing nesting behavior, it has been found that the females are more likely to lay eggs on days where there is a small difference between the air and water temperatures. Nesting behvaior studies also found that females will sometimes make terrestrial troughs near their nests. Some literature suggests its either a predation defense or a reprieve from high temperatures until the mother can return to aquatic lifestyle. Unlike in some other turtles, in the spiny softshell turtle, the sex of the hatchlings is not determined by temperature variations; it is determined by genetics. Predation was identified as the primary factor influencing hatching success in spiny softshell turtles, follwed by the effects of egg viability and parasitism.

Late-term embryos and hatchlings of spiny softshell turtles have been recently found to make various click- and chirp-type sounds before emergence onto the surface. The function of these sounds is currently unknown. Embryos also convert ammonia to urea, using limited water resources differently than expected

=== Respiration ===
Spiny softshell turtles are bimodal breathers, meaning they have the ability (to some degree) to perform oxygen and carbon dioxide exchange by breathing air or while breathing underwater. A variety of factors allow for these turtles to perform respiration underwater. They have an increase of cutaneous surface area and blood flow, reduction in lung size, and increase of respiratory epithelium in the cloaca and buccopharynx. This turtle is also known to utilize cutaneous respiration as well. Spiny softshell turtles are more dependent on underwater respiration than other freshwater species. This has led to their low tolerance of hypoxic waters; this becomes especially important during times of hibernation, when these turtles must choose hibernacula that are unlikely to become hypoxic. Underwater dormancy can last up to six months. They are known as an anoxia-intolerant species because of their dependency on underwater respiration. Other turtle species are more adapted to variation in oxygen levels but spiny softshell turtles are not able to regulate it as well, especially during hibernation periods. This makes choosing hibernacula very important to their over-winter survival. While they are susceptible to anoxia, they have the ability to maintain their metabolism completely via aerobic means which gives them a slight advantage when compared to other hibernating aquatic turtles during winter.

== Population Biology ==
Juvenile spiny softshell turtles have lower annual survival rates (approximately 0.72) compared to adults (approximately 0.84), indicating age-based differences in survival.

== Conservation ==
Overall, the spiny softshell turtle is widespread, common and not threatened, but some local populations are under pressure. In Canada, which is at the northern margin of its range and where the species is quite local, it is considered endangered. The very rare black spiny softshell turtle, a subspecies found only in Mexico's Cuatro Ciénegas Basin, is considered critically endangered.

== Taxonomy ==
The species was first described by Charles Alexandre Lesueur in 1827. It has been redescribed numerous times, leading to some confusion in its taxonomy.

=== Subspecies ===
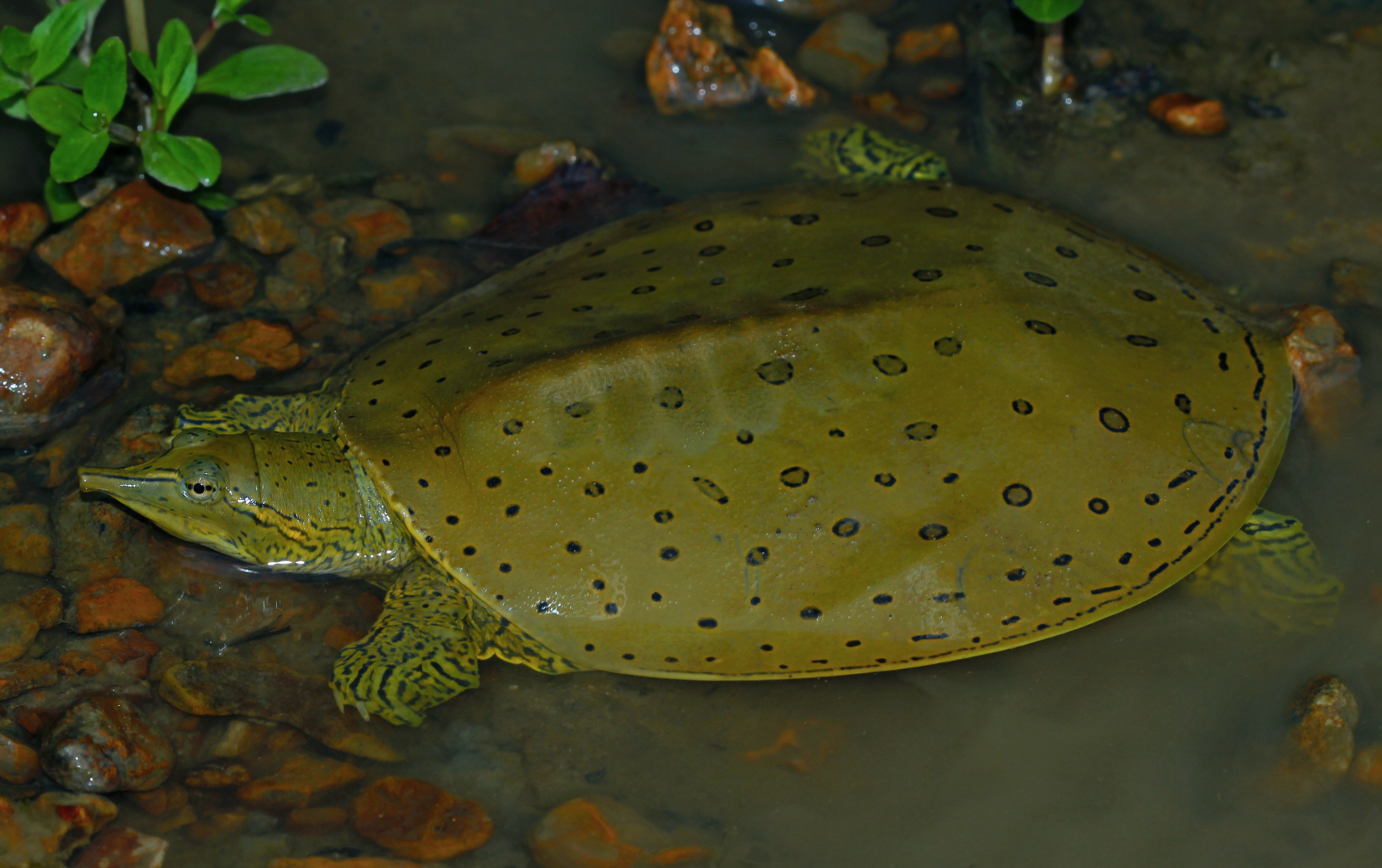
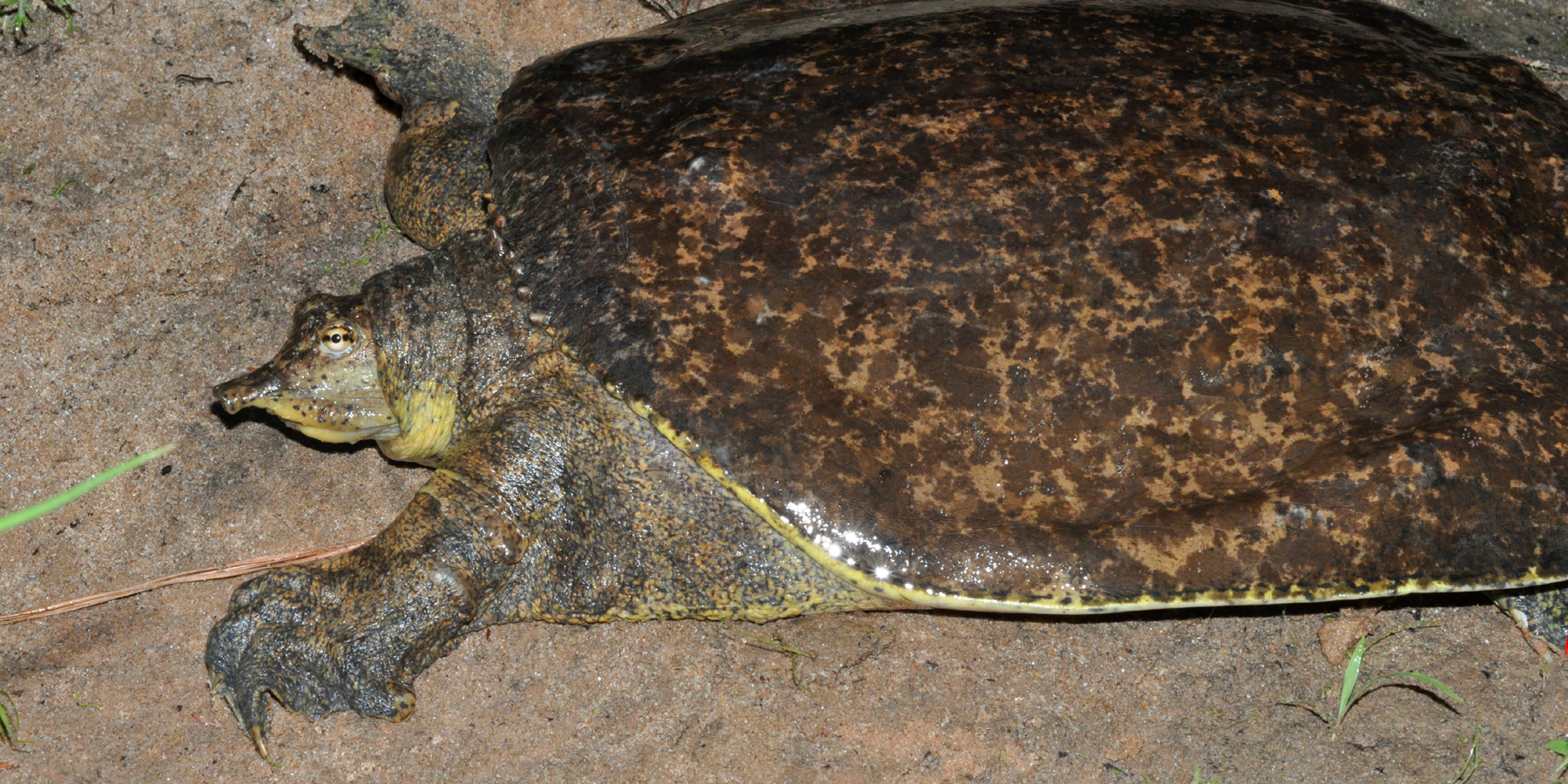
A. s. spinifera (above) and A. s. pallida (below). Both can vary considerably in coloration and markings.

The recognized subspecies differ in the markings on their carapaces, on the sides of their heads, and on their feet, although there are also considerable individual (not related to subspecies) variations in the appearance. Their markings, which are distinct as hatchlings, fade as the turtles grow larger. Adult females of the various subspecies, which grow larger than males, are not easily distinguishable from one another, and sometimes can only be assigned to a particular subspecies based on geography.

Six subspecies of A. spinifera are recognized, including the nominate subspecies:

- Northern spiny softshell turtle or eastern spiny softshell, A. s. spinifera (Lesueur, 1827)
- Gulf Coast spiny softshell turtle, A. s. aspera (Agassiz, 1857)
- Black spiny softshell turtle or Cuatro Cienegas softshell turtle, A. s. atra (Webb & Legler, 1960)
- Texas spiny softshell turtle, A. s. emoryi (Agassiz, 1857)
- Guadalupe spiny softshell turtle, A. s. guadalupensis (Webb, 1962)
- Pallid spiny softshell turtle, A. s. pallida (Webb, 1962)

A previously recognized subspecies, Apalone spinifera hartwegi (Conant & Goin, 1941), has been synonymized to A. s. spinifera as of 2011.

== Genomics ==
A rough-draft assembly of the A. spinifera aspera genome was completed in 2013 by the Genome Institute at Washington University in St. Louis. The assembly ASM38561v1 can be accessed via its Genbank accession ID APJP00000000.1
