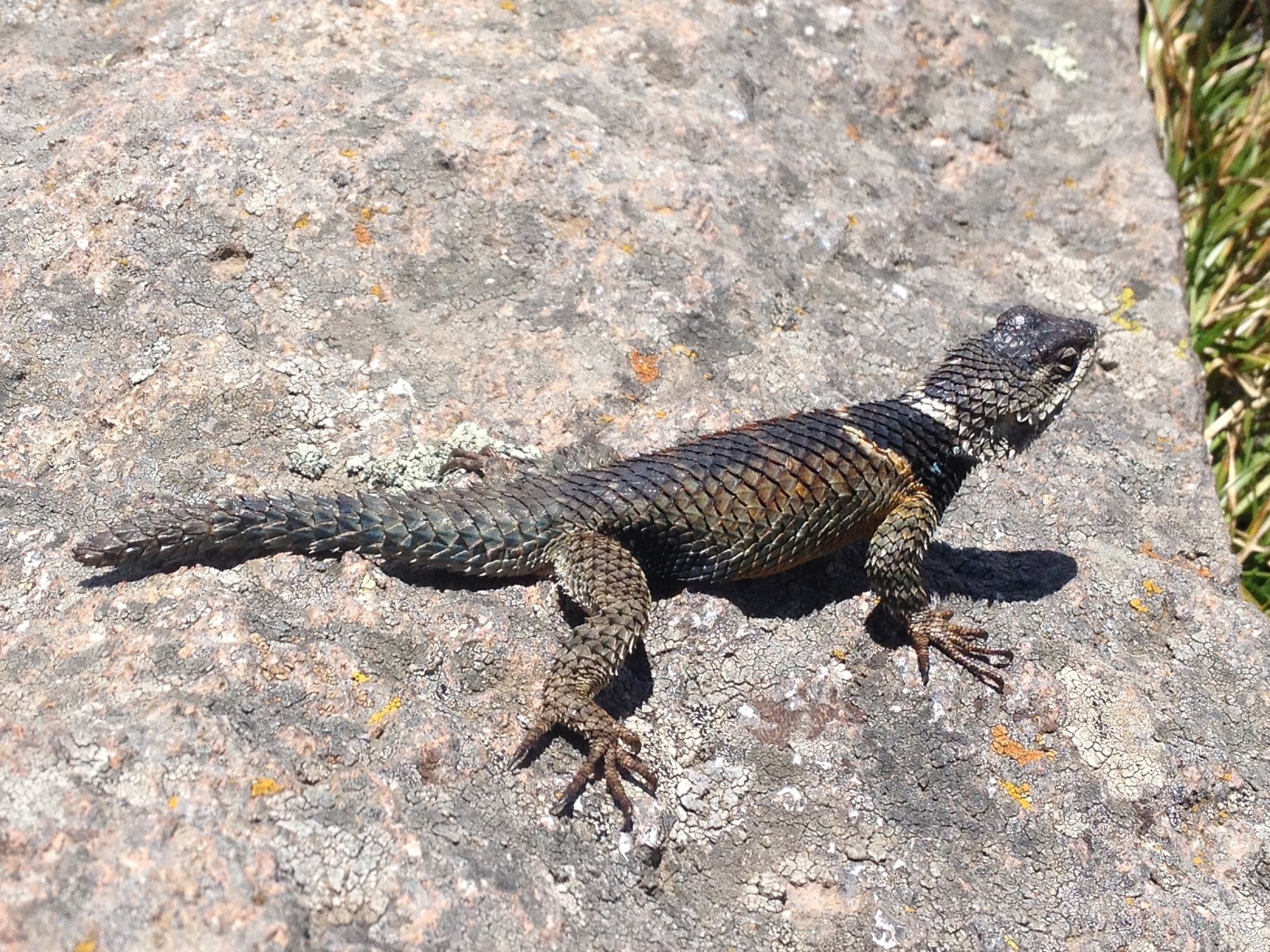
- Sceloporus mucronatus

Conservation status
- Least Concern (IUCN 3.1)

Scientific classification
- Kingdom: Animalia
- Phylum: Chordata
- Class: Reptilia
- Order: Squamata
- Suborder: Iguania
- Family: Phrynosomatidae
- Genus: Sceloporus
- Species: S. mucronatus

Binomial name
- Sceloporus mucronatus Cope, 1885

Synonyms
- Sceloporus torquatus mucronatus Cope, 1885

= Sceloporus mucronatus =

Cleft lizard

Species of lizard

Sceloporus mucronatus, also known commonly as the cleft lizard, the central cleft lizard, and la espinosa mucronada in Mexican Spanish, is a species of lizard in the subfamily Sceloporinae of the family Phrynosomatidae. The species is endemic to Mexico. There are two recognized subspecies.

== Geographic distribution ==
Sceloporus mucronatus is found in the Mexican states of Guerrero, Hidalgo, Oaxaca, Puebla, and Veracruz, and in Mexico City.

== Habitat ==
The preferred natural habitats of Sceloporus mucronatus are forest and shrubland, at elevations of 2,000–3,700 m (6,600–12,100 ft), but it has also been found in agricultural areas, where it shelters in rock crevices.

== Behavior ==
Sceloporus mucronatus is terrestrial.

== Reproduction ==
Sceloporus mucronatus gives birth to live young. Its mode of reproduction has been described as viviparous and as ovoviviparous.

== Subspecies ==
Two subspecies of Sceloporus mucronatus are recognized as being valid, including the nominotypical subspecies.

- Sceloporus mucronatus mucronatus Cope, 1885
- Sceloporus mucronatus olsoni Webb, Lemos-Espinal & H.M. Smith, 2002

== Etymology ==
The subspecific name, olsoni, is in honor of American herpetologist Rupert Earl Olson.
