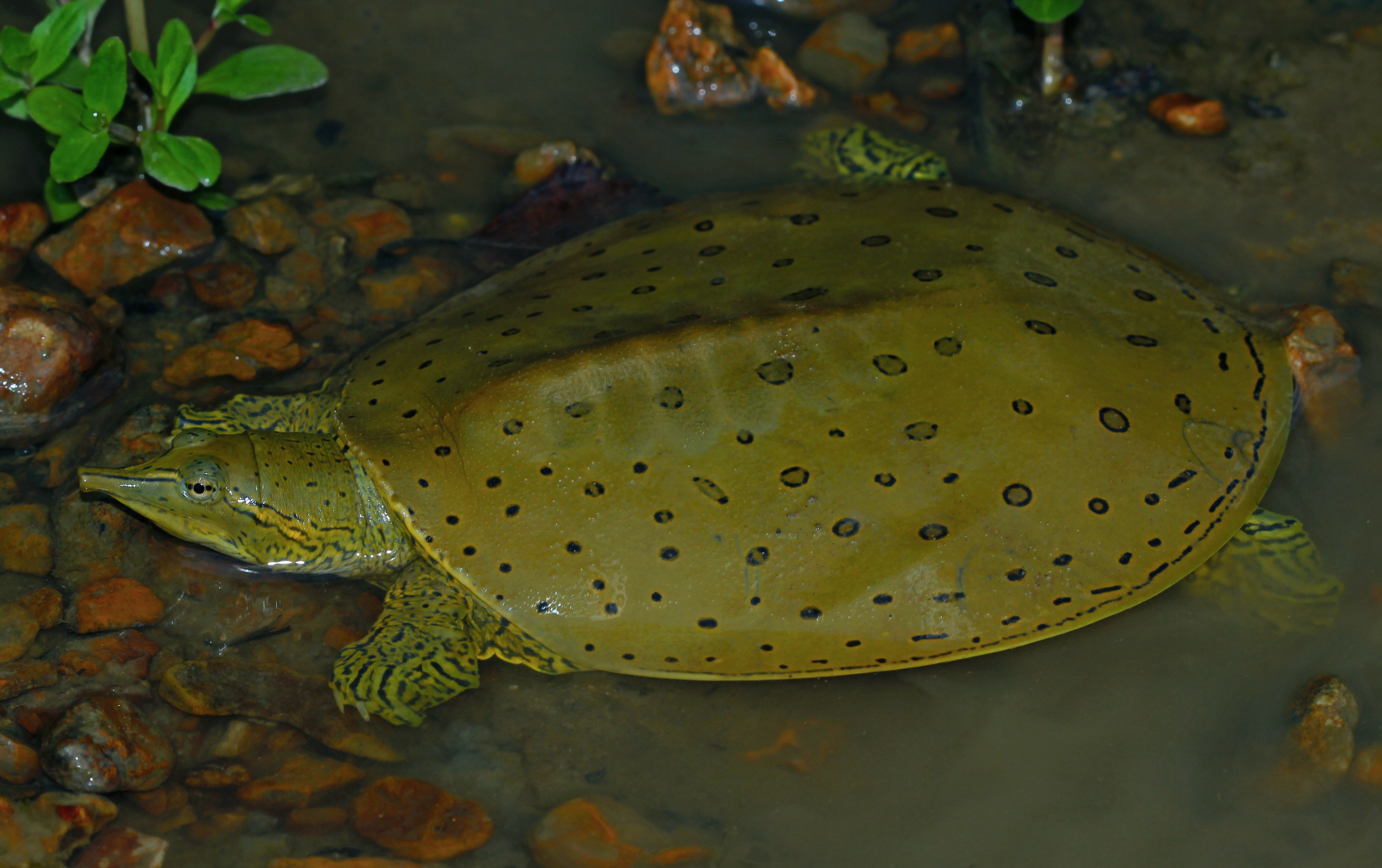

Conservation status
- Secure (NatureServe)

Scientific classification
- Kingdom: Animalia
- Phylum: Chordata
- Class: Reptilia
- Order: Testudines
- Suborder: Cryptodira
- Family: Trionychidae
- Genus: Apalone
- Species: A. spinifera
- Subspecies: A. s. spinifera

Trinomial name
- Apalone spinifera spinifera (Lesueur, 1827)

Synonyms
- Amyda spinifera hartwegi Conant & Goin, 1948; Amyda ferox hartwegi — Neill, 1951; Trionyx ferox hartwegi — Schmidt, 1953; Trionyx spinifer hartwegi — Schwartz, 1956; Trionyx spiniferus hartwegi — Wermuth & Mertens, 1961; Trionyx spiniferus bartwegi [sic] Curds & Knott, 1971 (ex errore); Apalone spinifera hartwegi — Ernst & Barbour, 1989; Apalone spinifera hartwegi — Stubbs, 1989

= Northern spiny softshell turtle =

Subspecies of turtle

The northern spiny softshell turtle (Apalone spinifera spinifera) is a subspecies of soft-shelled turtle in the family Trionychidae. The subspecies is native to the United States and can be found from Montana at the western edge of its range to Vermont and Quebec on the eastern edge. Introduced populations have also been found in Massachusetts, New Jersey, Arizona, and Virginia.

== Etymology ==
Apalone spinifera spinifera has sometimes been used only to designate populations east of the Mississippi, while populations west of the Mississippi have been designated Apalone spinifera hartwegi. The subspecific name hartwegi is in honor of Dr. Norman Edouard Hartweg (1904–1964), who was a specialist in turtles and professor of zoology at the University of Michigan. While some morphological differences exist between northeastern and northwestern populations, a phylogeographic study found little genetic support for a distinction between eastern and western populations and recommended both groups be simply referred to as northern spiny softshell turtles. This designation is currently recognized in the most up-to-date taxonomic checklist.
