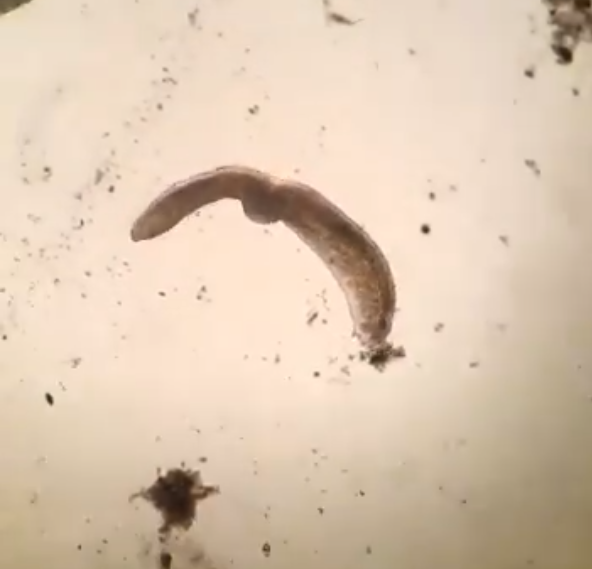
- Cephalogonimus vesicaudus, side view

Scientific classification
- Kingdom: Animalia
- Phylum: Platyhelminthes
- Class: Trematoda
- Order: Plagiorchiida
- Family: Cephalogonimidae
- Genus: Cephalogonimus
- Species: C. vesicaudus

Binomial name
- Cephalogonimus vesicaudus Nickerson, 1912

= Cephalogonimus vesicaudus =

Species of fluke

Cephalogonimus vesicaudus is a species of digenean trematode parasite found in North America. This species typically infects the small intestine of North American soft shell turtles, but may also infect slider turtles, map turtles, mud turtles, green frogs, and ducks.
