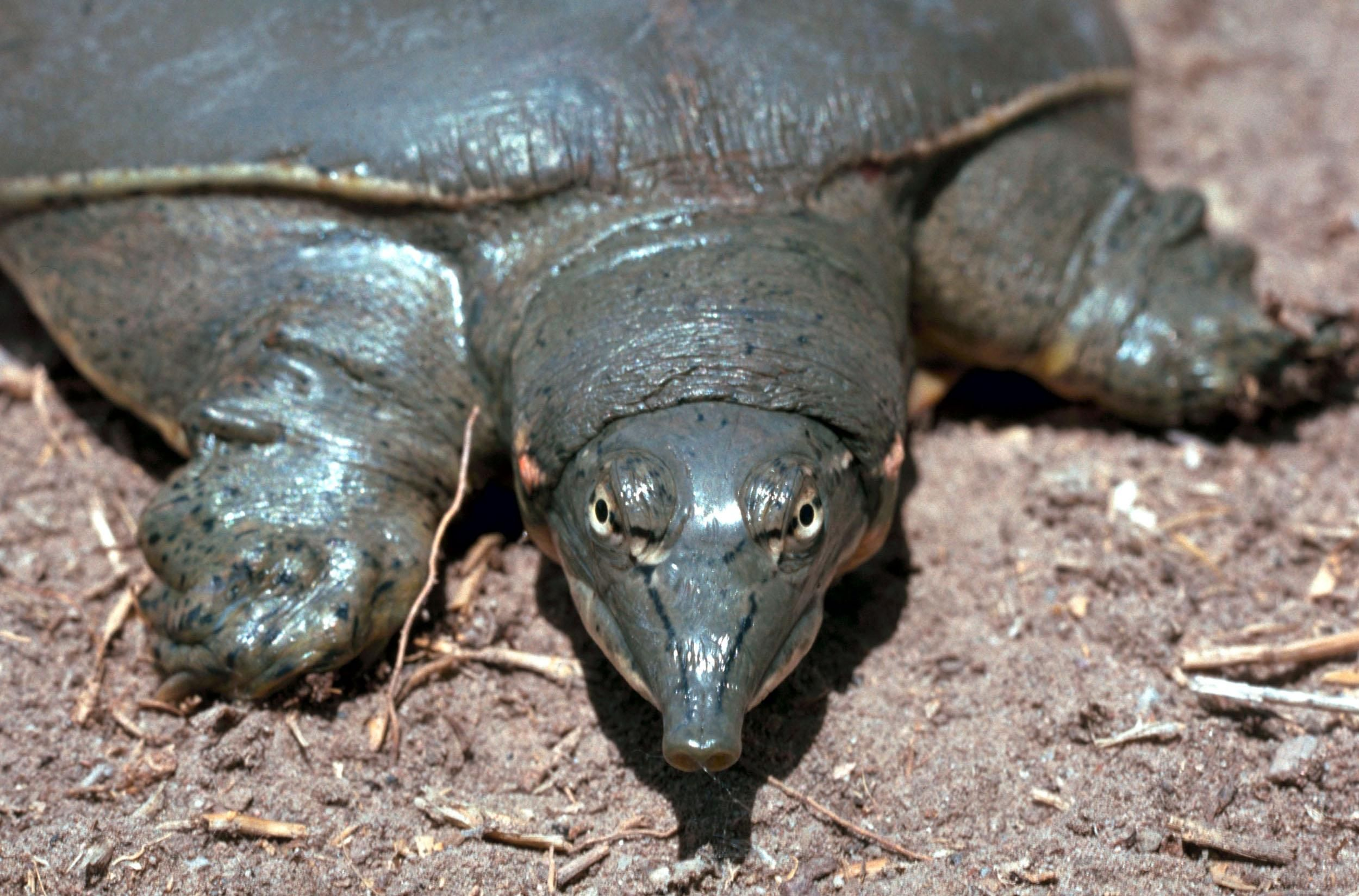

Conservation status
- Apparently Secure (NatureServe)

Scientific classification
- Kingdom: Animalia
- Phylum: Chordata
- Class: Reptilia
- Order: Testudines
- Suborder: Cryptodira
- Family: Trionychidae
- Genus: Apalone
- Species: A. spinifera
- Subspecies: A. s. emoryi

Trinomial name
- Apalone spinifera emoryi (Agassiz, 1857)

Synonyms
- List: Aspidonectes emoryi Agassiz, 1857; Trionyx emoryi — Strauch, 1862; Aspidonectes emyda Gray, 1870; Aspidonectes georgii Gray, 1870; Platypeltis emoryii [sic] — Baur, 1893 (ex errore); Platypeltis emoryi — Siebenrock, 1909; Amyda emoryi — Stejneger & T. Barbour, 1917; Amyda emoryii — Strecker, 1927; Amyda ferox emoryi — Neill, 1951; Trionyx ferox emoryi — Schmidt, 1953; Trionyx spinifer emoryi — A. Schwartz, 1956; Trionyx spinifera emoryi — Minton, 1959; Trionyx spiniferus emoryi — Wermuth & Mertens, 1961; Trionyx spiniferus emoryir [sic] Honegger, 1982 (ex errore); Apalone spinifera emoryi — Ernst & R. Barbour, 1989; Apalone spinifera emoryi — Stubbs, 1989

= Texas spiny softshell turtle =

Subspecies of turtle

The Texas spiny softshell turtle (Apalone spinifera emoryi) is a subspecies of the spiny softshell turtle in the family Trionychidae. The subspecies is native to the southwestern United States and adjacent northeastern Mexico.

== Etymology ==
The subspecific name, emoryi, is in honor of United States Army officer and surveyor William Hemsley Emory.

== Geographic range ==
A. s. emoryi is found in western Texas and New Mexico, in the Rio Grande and its immediate tributaries, and in the Mexican states of Coahuila and Tamaulipas.

== Diet ==
In the Texas portion of the Pecos River, A. s. emoryi were found to be primarily insectivorous, feeding on coleopterans, hymenopterans, odonates, and orthopterans.
