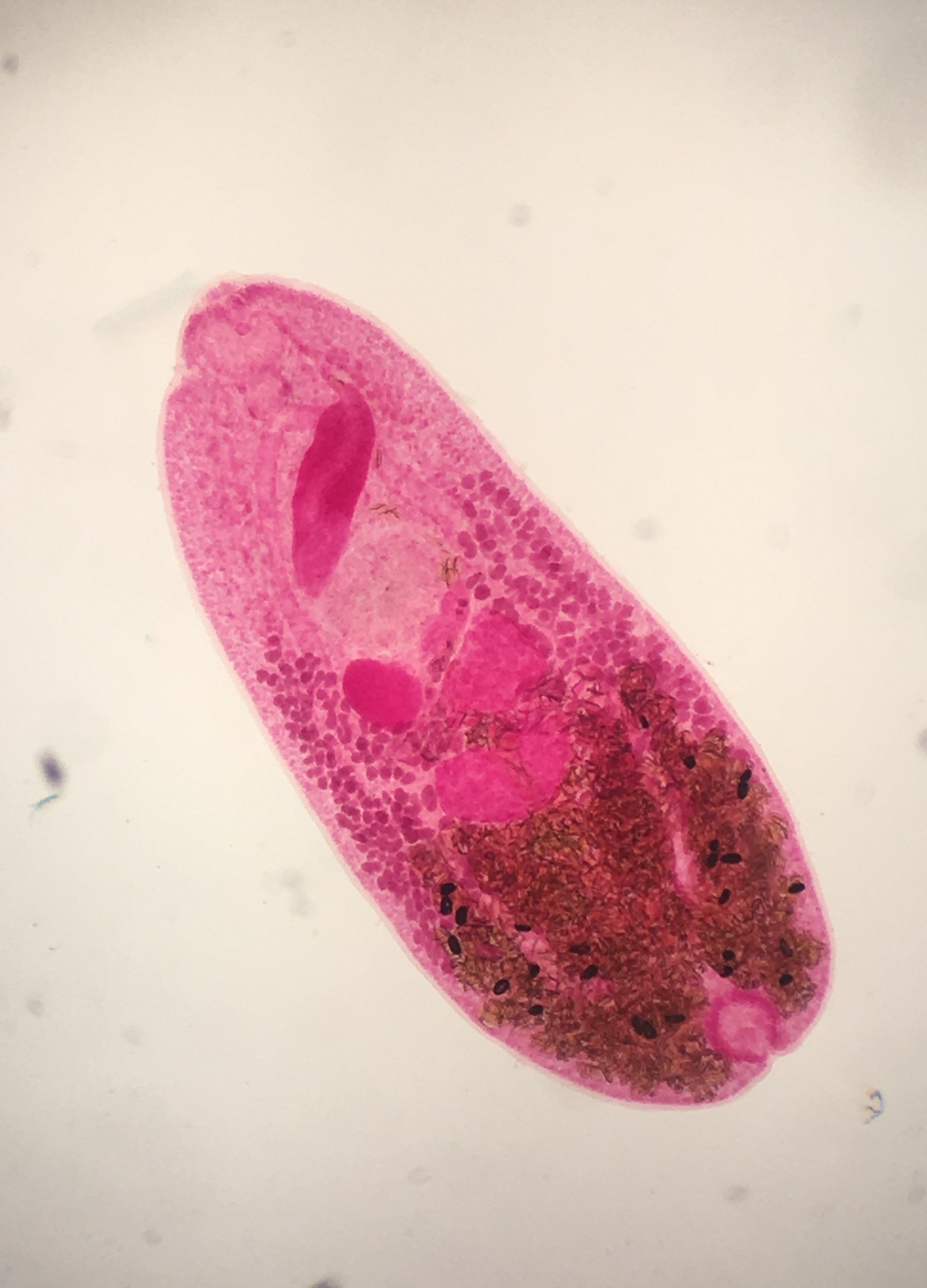
- Cephalogonimus vesicaudus

Scientific classification
- Kingdom: Animalia
- Phylum: Platyhelminthes
- Class: Trematoda
- Order: Plagiorchiida
- Suborder: Xiphidiata
- Superfamily: Plagiorchioidea
- Family: Cephalogonimidae; Looss, 1899

= Cephalogonimidae =

Family of flukes

Cephalogonimidae is a family of trematode parasites characterized by a genital pore located anterior to the oral sucker, at the apex of the body.

== Classification ==
This family comprises two genera containing a number of species.

- Cephalogonimoides
  - Cephalogonimoides sireni Premvati, 1969
- Cephalogonimus
  - Cephalogonimus americanus Stafford, 1902
  - Cephalogonimus amphiumae Chandler, 1923
  - Cephalogonimus brevicirrus Ingles, 1932
  - Cephalogonimus europaeus Blaizot, 1910
  - Cephalogonimus heteropneustes Gupta, 1951
  - Cephalogonimus lenoiri (Poirier 1886)
  - Cephalogonimus retusus (Dujardin, 1845)
  - Cephalogonimus salamandrus Dronen and Lang, 1974
  - Cephalogonimus vesicaudus Nickerson, 1912
- Emoleptalea
  - Emoleptalea dollfusi Srivastava, 1960
  - Emoleptalea hardayali Kumar and Agrawal, 1963
  - Emoleptalea horai Gupta, 1955
  - Emoleptalea kanungoi Agrawal and Agrawal, 1985
  - Emoleptalea loosi Srivastava, 1960
  - Emoleptalea rifaati Ramadan, Saoud, and Taha, 1987
  - Emoleptalea synodontidos Dollfus, 1950
- Masenia
  - Masenia bangweulensis Beverly-Burton, 1962
  - Masenia carangai Gupta and Tandon, 1985
  - Masenia collata Chatterji, 1933
  - Masenia dayali (Gupta, 1955)
  - Masenia gomtia Agrawal and Agrawal, 1985
  - Masenia kwangtungensis Pan, 1984
  - Masenia moradabadensis Srivastava, 1960
  - Masenia orissai Gupta and Tandon, 1985
  - Masenia quiloni (Gupta and Tandon, 1985)
  - Masenia synodontis Khalil and Thurston, 1973
  - Masenia upeneusi Gupta and Puri, 1984
  - Masenia vittatusi Agrawal, 1963
