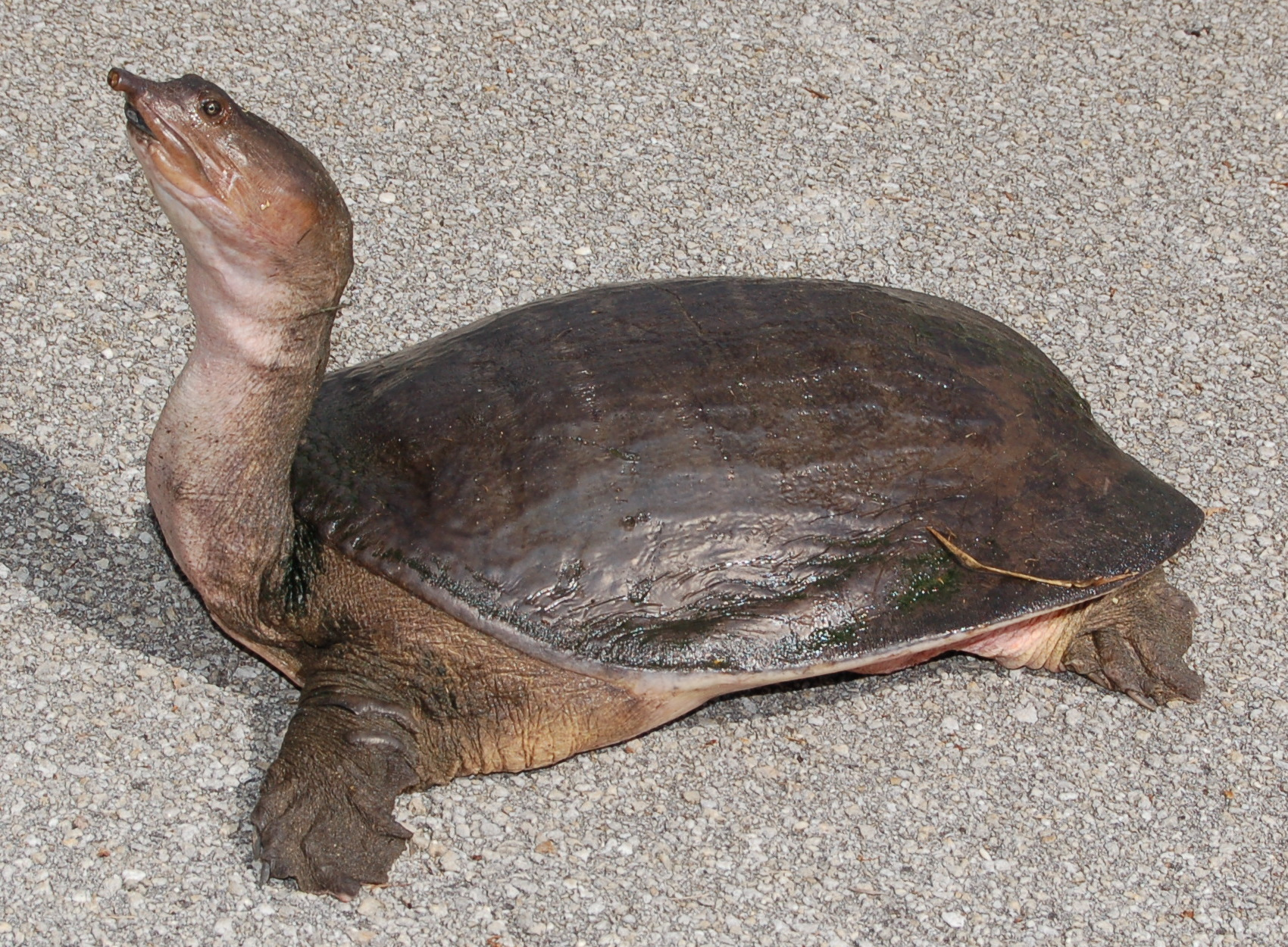

Conservation status
- Least Concern (IUCN 3.1)

Scientific classification
- Kingdom: Animalia
- Phylum: Chordata
- Class: Reptilia
- Order: Testudines
- Suborder: Cryptodira
- Family: Trionychidae
- Genus: Apalone
- Species: A. ferox

Binomial name
- Apalone ferox (Schneider, 1783)
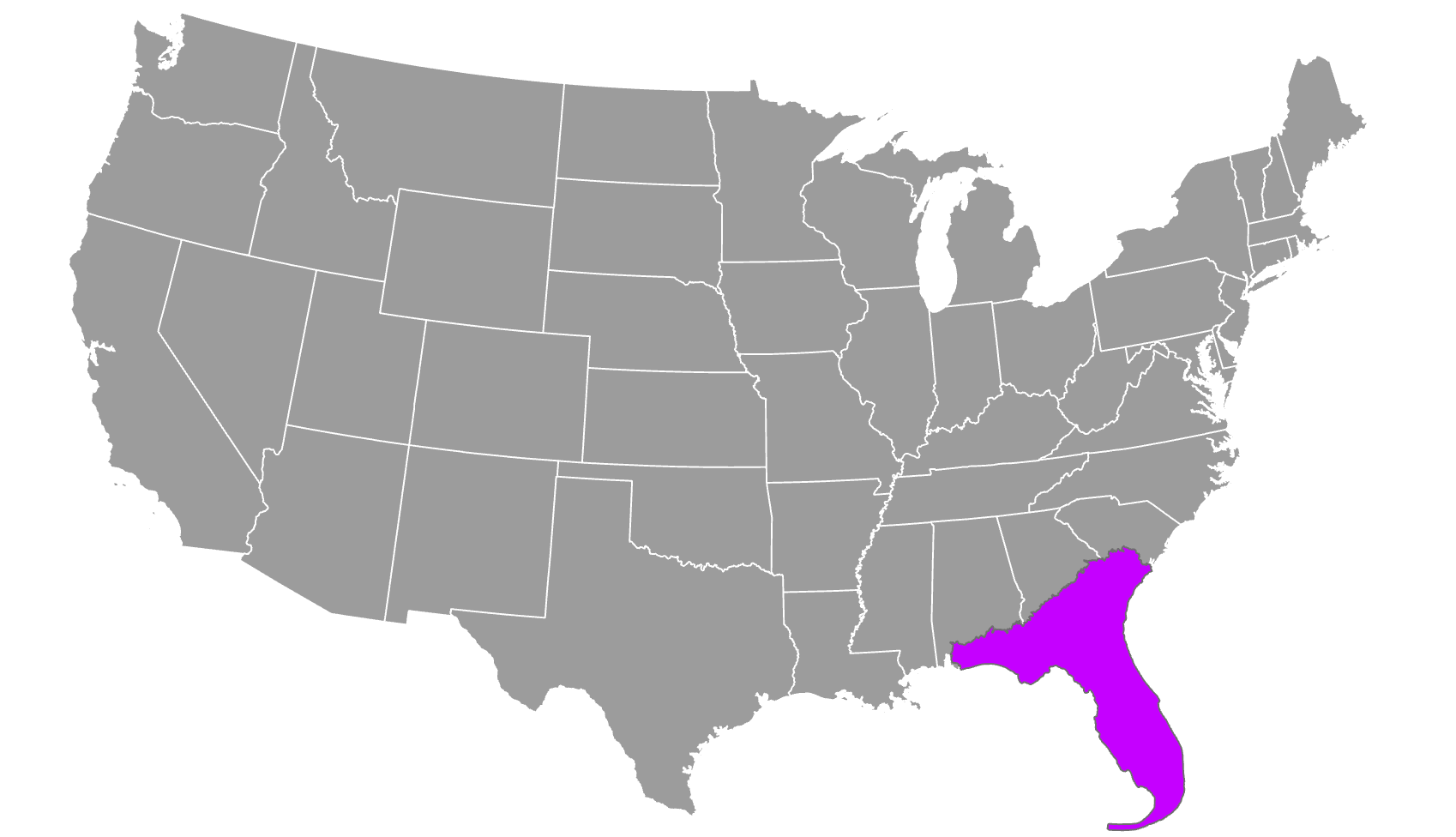
- Florida softshell turtle range

Synonyms
- List: Testudo ferox Schneider, 1783; Testudo mollis Lacépède, 1788; Testudo bartrami Daudin, 1801; Emydes ferox — Brongniart, 1805; Chelys bartramii Geoffroy Saint-Hilaire, 1809 (ex errore); Trionyx carinatus Geoffroy Saint-Hilaire, 1809; Trionyx georgianus Geoffroy Saint-Hilaire, 1809; Trionyx georgicus Geoffroy Saint-Hilaire, 1809; Trionyx brongniarti Schweigger, 1812; Trionyx ferox — Schweigger, 1812; Amyda ferox — Oken, 1816; Trionix ferox — Gray, 1825; Aspidonectes carinatus — Wagler, 1830; Aspidonectes ferox — Wagler, 1830; Trionyx bartrami — LeConte, 1830; Testudo brongniartii Gray, 1831 (ex errore); Mesodeca bartrami — Rafinesque, 1832; Testudo bartramii — A.M.C. Duméril & Bibron, 1835; Trionyx brongnartii A.M.C. Duméril & Bibron, 1835 (ex errore); Trionyx harlani Bell, 1835; Platypeltis ferox — Fitzinger, 1843; Aspenodectes ferox — LeConte, 1854; Platypeltis brongnartii — O.P. Hay, 1903; Platypeltis erox O.P. Hay, 1903 (ex errore); Amyda ferox ferox — Neill, 1951; Trionyx ferox ferox — Schmidt, 1953; Apalone ferox — Meylan, 1987; Trionix feroz Richard, 1999 (ex errore)

= Florida softshell turtle =

Species of turtle

The Florida softshell turtle (Apalone ferox) is a species of turtle in the family Trionychidae. The species is native to the Southeastern United States. The maximum recorded lifespan of a Florida softshell turtle is 26 years.

== Geographic range ==
The Florida softshell turtle is found primarily in Florida, but it also ranges to southern sections of Alabama, Georgia, and South Carolina. It is the only species of softshell turtle whose range spans the entire Florida peninsula. Of the three species in the genus Apalone, the Florida softshell turtle occupies the smallest geographic range.

=== Habitat use ===
The Florida softshell turtle is a widespread species and occupies almost every freshwater habitat, even tolerating some brackish environments; however, it is not often found in water with strong currents, preferring habitats with slow-moving or still water. These different habitats include swamps, lakes, marshes, wet prairies, small rivers, creeks, and even ponds formed in man-made ditches or sinkholes.

== Description ==
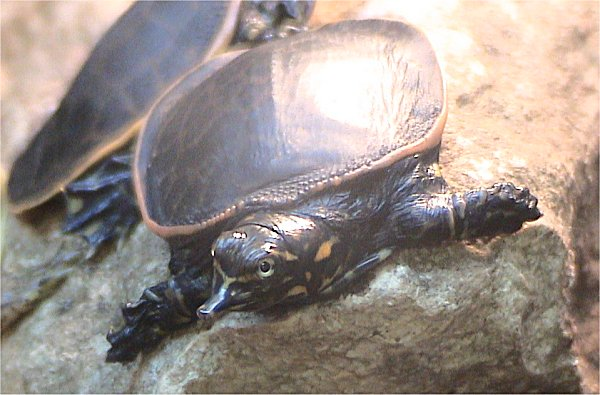
Juvenile coloration in Florida softshell turtle (A ferox)

The Florida softshell turtle is a large turtle with a flattened, pancake-like body, a long neck, an elongated head with a long snorkel-like nose, and large webbed feet, each with three claws. While most turtles have hard shells composed of scutes, the Florida softshell turtle has a cartilaginous carapace covered in leathery skin. Ranging from olive green to dark brown, it has the darkest coloration of all the softshell species that inhabit Florida (other species include Apalone mutica calvata and Apalone spinifera aspera). It is also characterized by a white or cream-colored underside. This color pattern is known as countershading and is a form of camouflage to conceal turtles from potential predators.

It is the largest species of softshell turtle found in Florida and all of North America, ranging from 15 to 76 cm (5.9 to 29.9 in) in straight-line carapace length. The Florida softshell turtle also exhibits significant sexual size dimorphism. Adult females are often 3-5 times larger than males. Males have a carapace length and body weight averaging about 35 cm (14 in) and 2.68 kg (5.9 lb) respectively. Nesting adult females were found to average 6.65 kg (14.7 lb) in weight and measure 40.1 cm (15.8 in) in carapace length, with the record weight documented at 43.6 kg (96 lb). However, males tend to have longer tails than their female counterparts (3 cm longer than a female of the same size). Hatchlings have a lighter carapace with yellow and orange markings and a carapacial rim. Stripes in the same color are also found on the face and neck. The plastron of hatchlings is generally dark in color. As the turtle ages, these colors fade and are lost, resulting in the dark-brown coloration characteristic of adults.

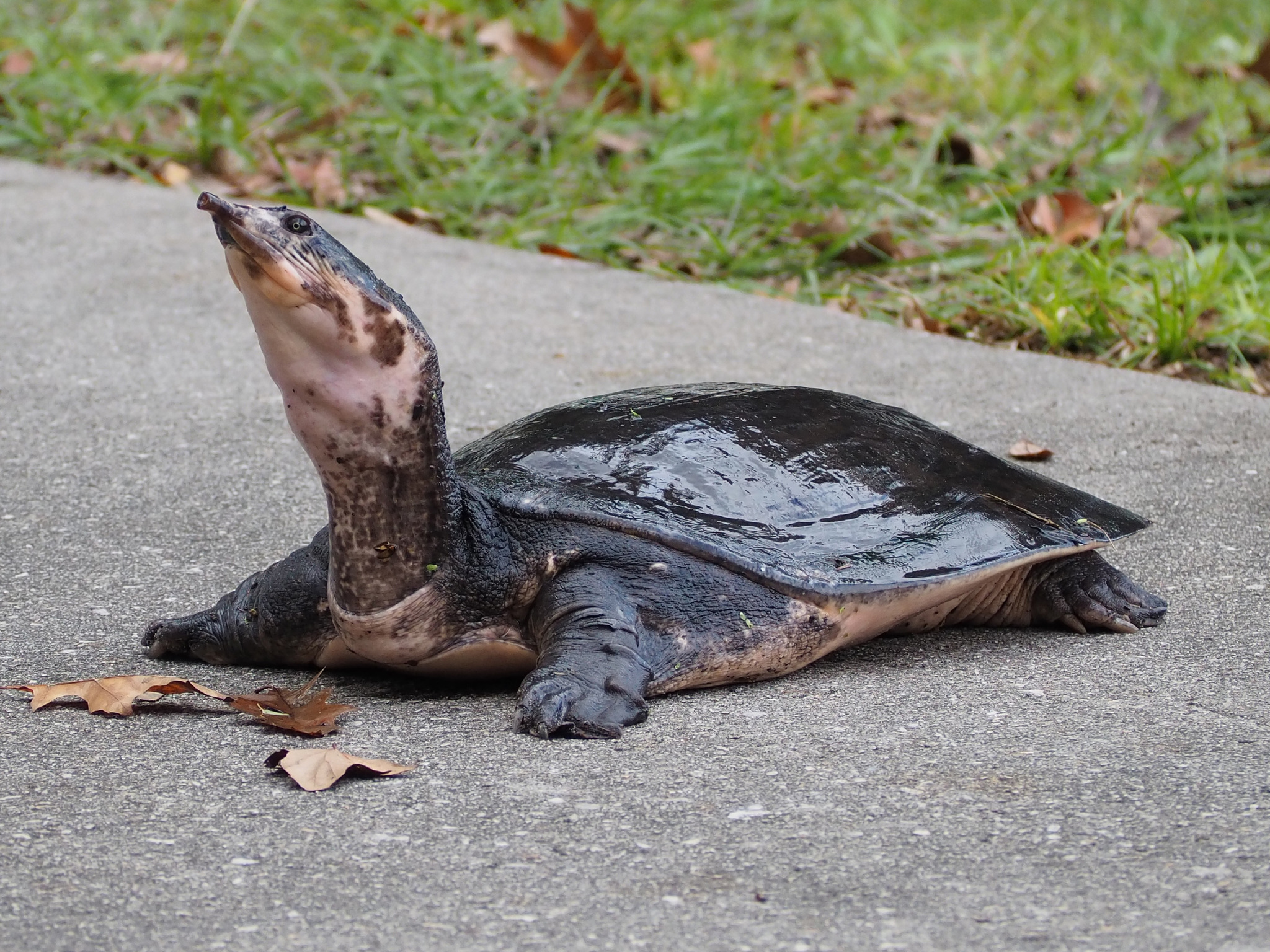

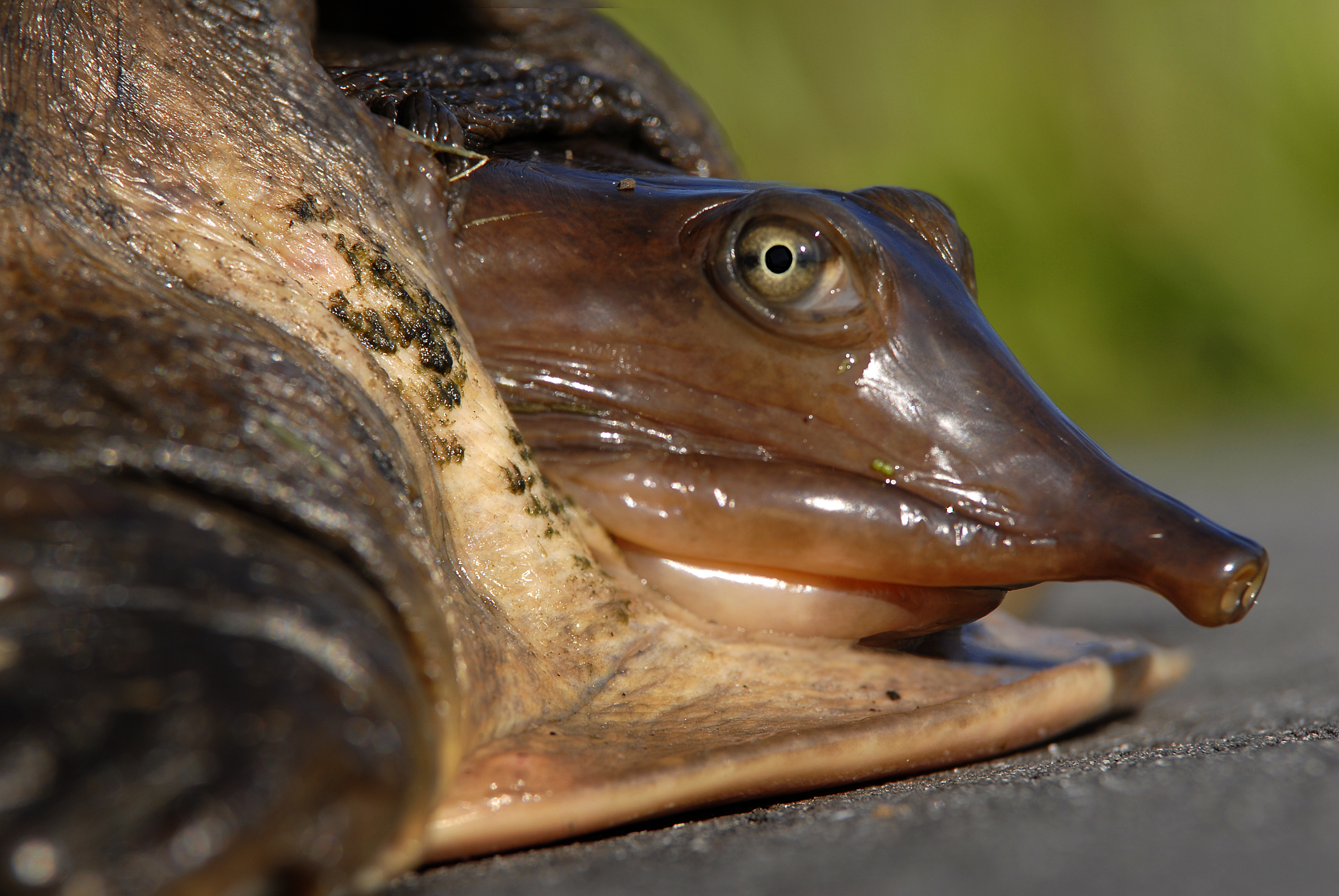
Close up

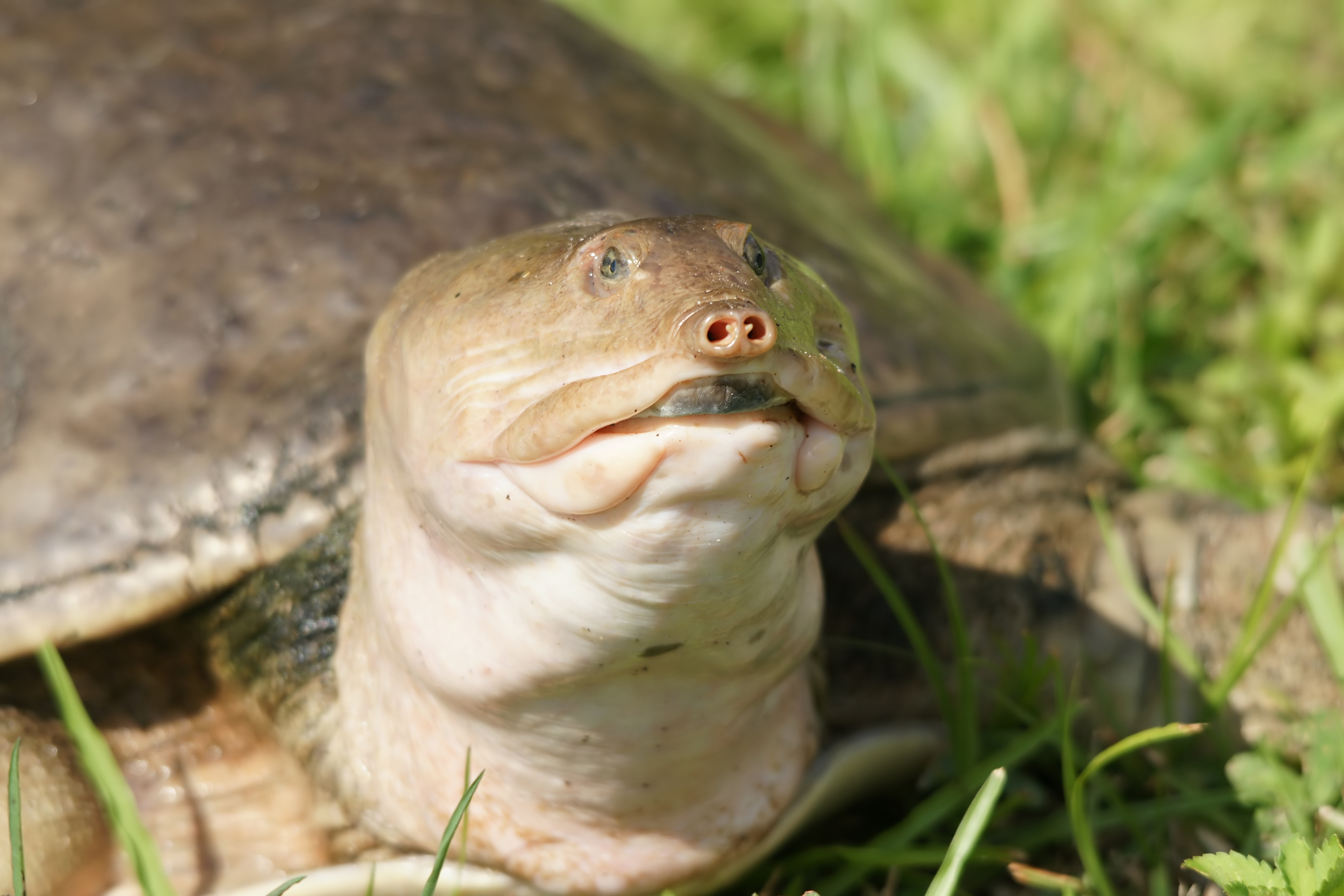
Close up

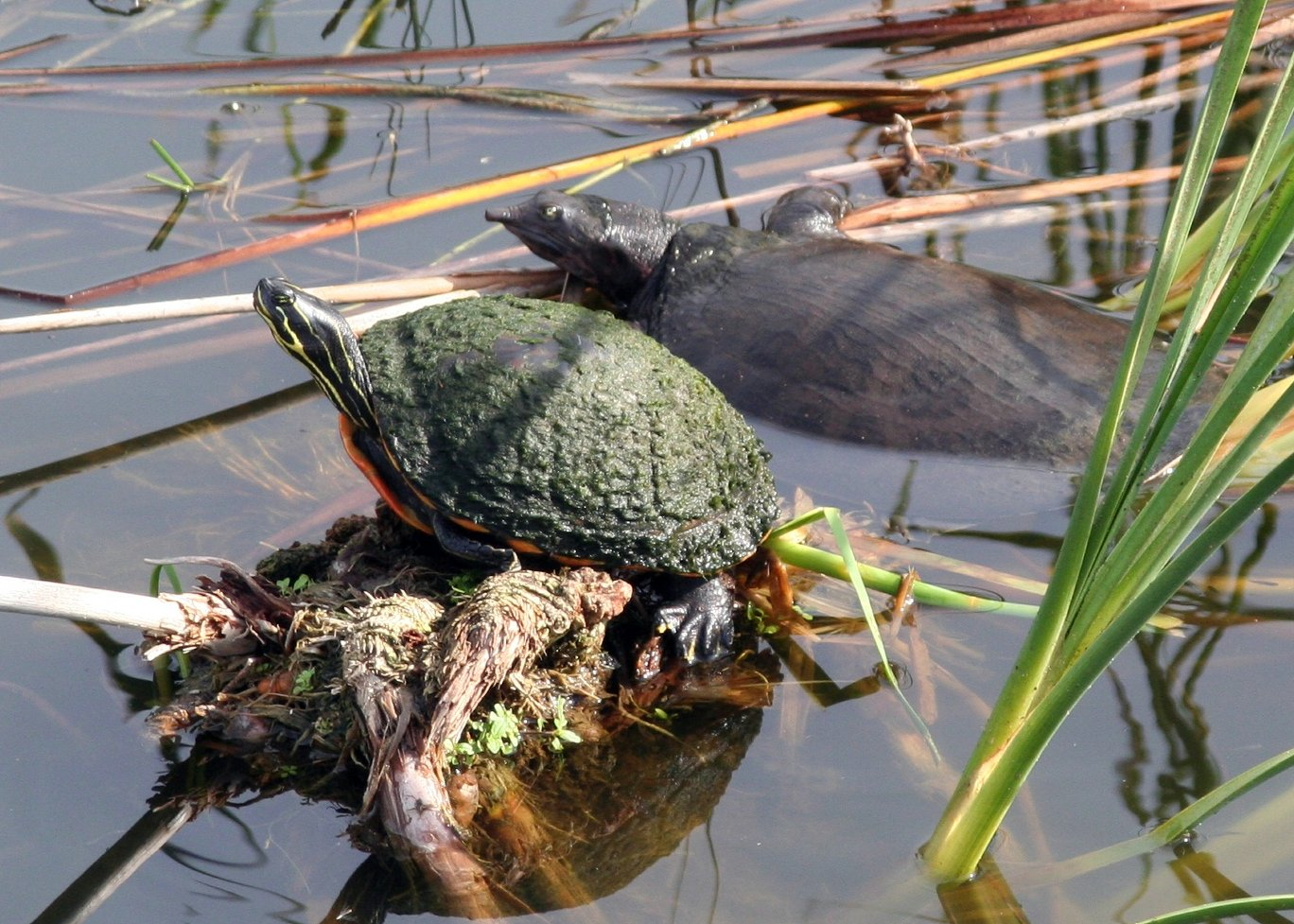
With a Florida red-bellied cooter

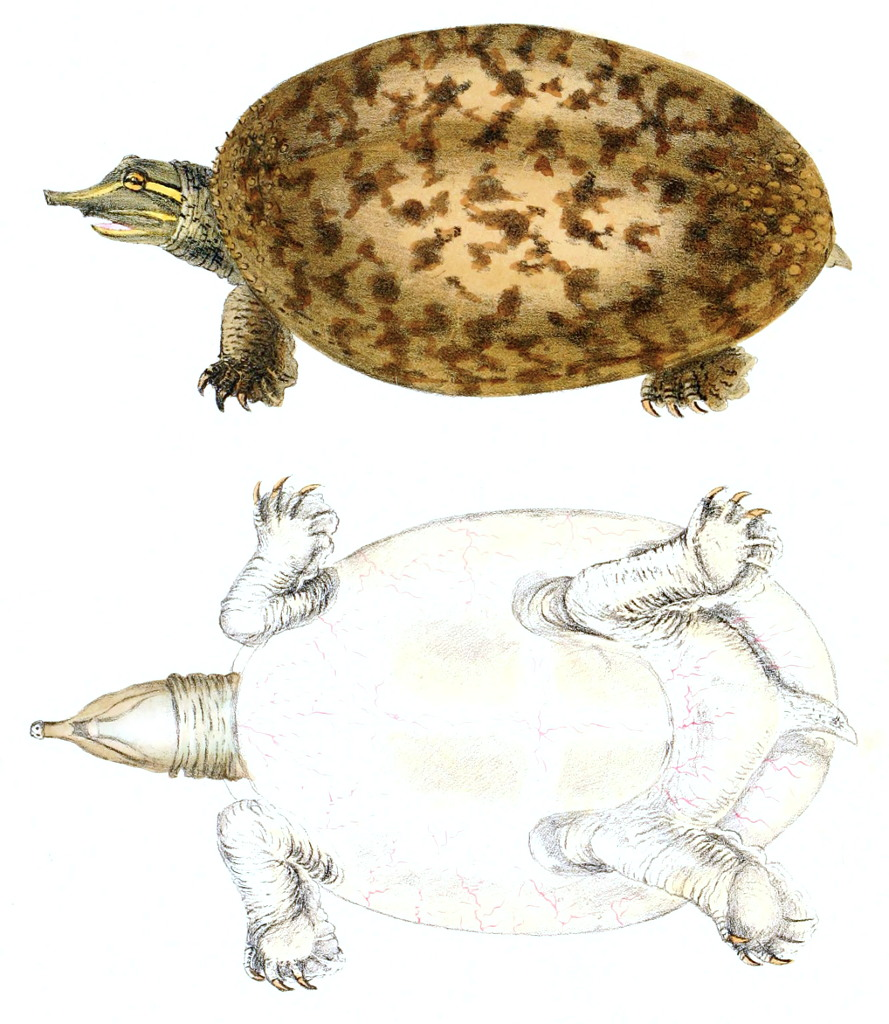
1842 illustration showing countershading

== Behavior ==
The Florida softshell turtle is almost entirely aquatic, emerging from the water only to bask or to lay eggs. In the water, it prefers to bury itself in the sandy/muddy substrate. Like all softshells, it is very fast-moving in water and on land. While this species is omnivorous, its diet consists largely of meat, consuming mainly fish, insects, crustaceans, frogs and mollusks. It may also scavenge.

== Reproduction ==
=== Males ===
The reproductive cycle of male Florida softshell turtles follows a postnuptial pattern, with a cycle of spring mating followed by spermatogenesis in the fall. The male will produce sperm during the fall and store that sperm in the epididymides through the winter. This stored sperm can then be utilized for copulation during the following spring mating season. Evidence suggests that they undergo spermatogenesis every year. Males of this species reach sexual maturity at small sizes (below 0.7 kg), allowing them to begin reproducing quickly following birth. This implies that some males may be able to reproduce as young as two years of age.

=== Females ===
While males consistently reach sexual maturity at small sizes, that size is larger and more variable in females. Some may reach maturity at a plastron length of 24 cm, and others may not mature until they reach a length closer to 30 cm. The onset of sexual maturity will occur anywhere from 5 – 8 years of age. The female nesting season can range anywhere from early April to early August, and incubation lasts an average of 60 – 90 days. In a study examining female reproduction, almost 10% of the females examined in a single breeding season showed signs of inactive ovaries, implying that, unlike males, females may not possess the ability to reproduce every year. Florida softshell females have the ability to produce an average of 4 – 5 egg clutches in a single breeding season, potentially producing a new clutch every three weeks. Florida softshell turtles have one of the highest annual egg production rates of any reptile. The study previously mentioned showed an average of over 20 eggs per clutch, with the largest clutch containing 38 eggs.

== Ecology ==
With a primarily carnivorous diet, adult Florida softshell turtles function as major predators in their aquatic ecosystems. Sitting high on the trophic scale, they generally function as secondary or tertiary consumers. However, alligators have been known to prey on the adults of the Florida softshell turtle, and raptors may take juveniles. Nest predators include the fish crow, foxes, raccoons, skunks, and river otters.

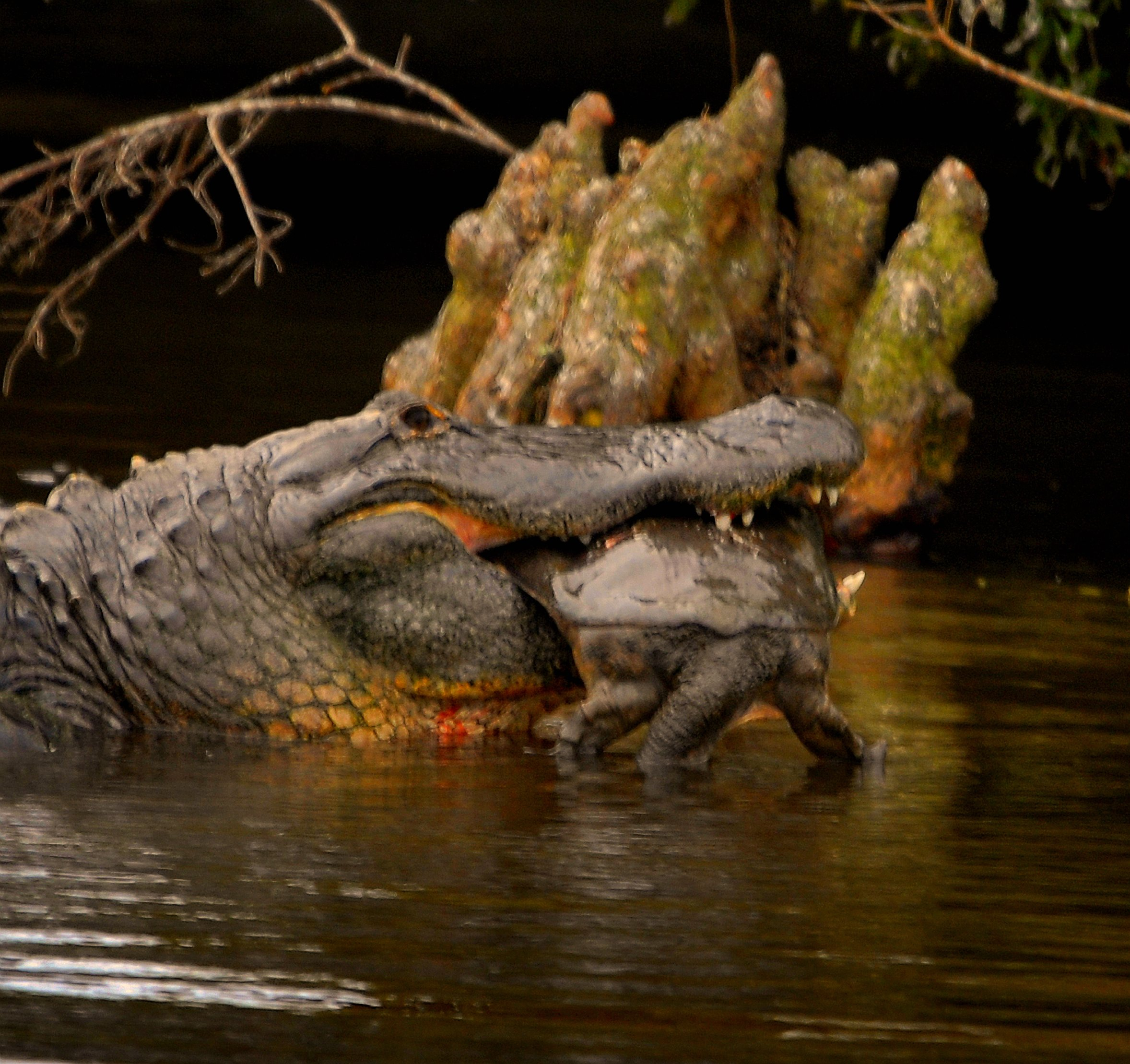
Preyed on by an American alligator

Nests are also robbed by American black bears. Young turtles are also eaten by other turtles (Chelydra, Macroclemys), snakes (Agkistrodon, Nerodia), herons, egrets and nine-banded armadillos.

=== Utilization of American alligator nests ===
At various lakes across the state of Florida (Okeechobee, Apopka, Griffin, and Jesup) scientists have observed Florida softshell females, as well as other turtle species (Pseudemys nelsoni, Kinosternon sp., and Sternotherus odoratus) laying their eggs in American alligator (Alligator mississippiensis) nests during the summer months. While the turtles may utilize vacant nests more often, they have also been known to lay eggs in occupied alligator nests. They use these nests more often in areas with limited nesting habitats and/or during years with heavier precipitation when high water levels and flooding further reduce the number of suitable nesting sites.

Despite the Florida softshell's use of alligator nests, studies have shown the highest abundance of Florida softshell turtles to persist in lakes with little to no alligators as well as high primary productivity, suggesting a combination of top-down and bottom-up influences on Florida softshell turtle populations.

== Anthropogenic threats ==
The Florida softshell turtle is common throughout Florida and other parts of its range. However, wild populations are subject to various threats at the hands of humans. Some of these threats include commercial harvesting for meat, harvesting for the pet trade, and roadway mortalities.

== Diet ==
The Florida softshell turtle is carnivorous with its main diet consisting of small snails and fish. It also preys upon amphibians, insects, crustaceans, mollusks, small turtles (such as Pseudemys and Sternotherus), snakes (such as Nerodia and Regina), and some waterfowl. The Florida softshell turtle will hunt, chase, and scavenge for prey. Vegetation and seeds sometimes occur in stomach contents.
