= Norman Edouard Hartweg =

American herpetologist

Norman Edouard "Kibe" Hartweg (August 20, 1904 – February 16, 1964) was an American herpetologist, Curator of Herpetology for the Museum of Zoology at the University of Michigan, and president of the American Society of Ichthyologists and Herpetologists. He was a specialist in the taxonomy and distribution of turtles, and is honored by having a subspecies of turtle named after him: the western spiny softshell turtle (Apalone spinifera hartwegi). He is also credited with having described several new species, including the Big Bend slider (Trachemys gaigeae), the Oaxacan patchnose snake (Salvadora intermedia), and Dunn's hognose pit viper (Porthidium dunni).

The scientific exploits of Hartweg also led him to discover the corpse of a murdered lady in 1932, in an area that later became the Pymatuning Reservoir. The case was never solved.

== Career ==
Hartweg attained his doctorate at the University of Michigan in 1934 under the direction of Dr. Alexander Grant Ruthven and became eventually a professor at the Department of Zoology. In 1946, he became Curator of Herpetology at the Museum of Zoology. In 1950, he became editor of herpetology for the periodical Copeia, and for 1960 he was elected president of the American Society of Ichthyologists and Herpetologists. He died on February 16, 1964, after a sudden illness.

== Legacy ==
Two species of amphibians are named after Hartweg: Hartweg's salamander (Bolitoglossa hartwegi) and Hartweg's spikethumb frog (Plectrohyla hartwegi). Two subspecies of reptiles are named after him: the western spiny softshell turtle (Apalone spinifera hartwegi) and Hartweg's emerald lizard (Sceloporus taeniocnemis hartwegi).
