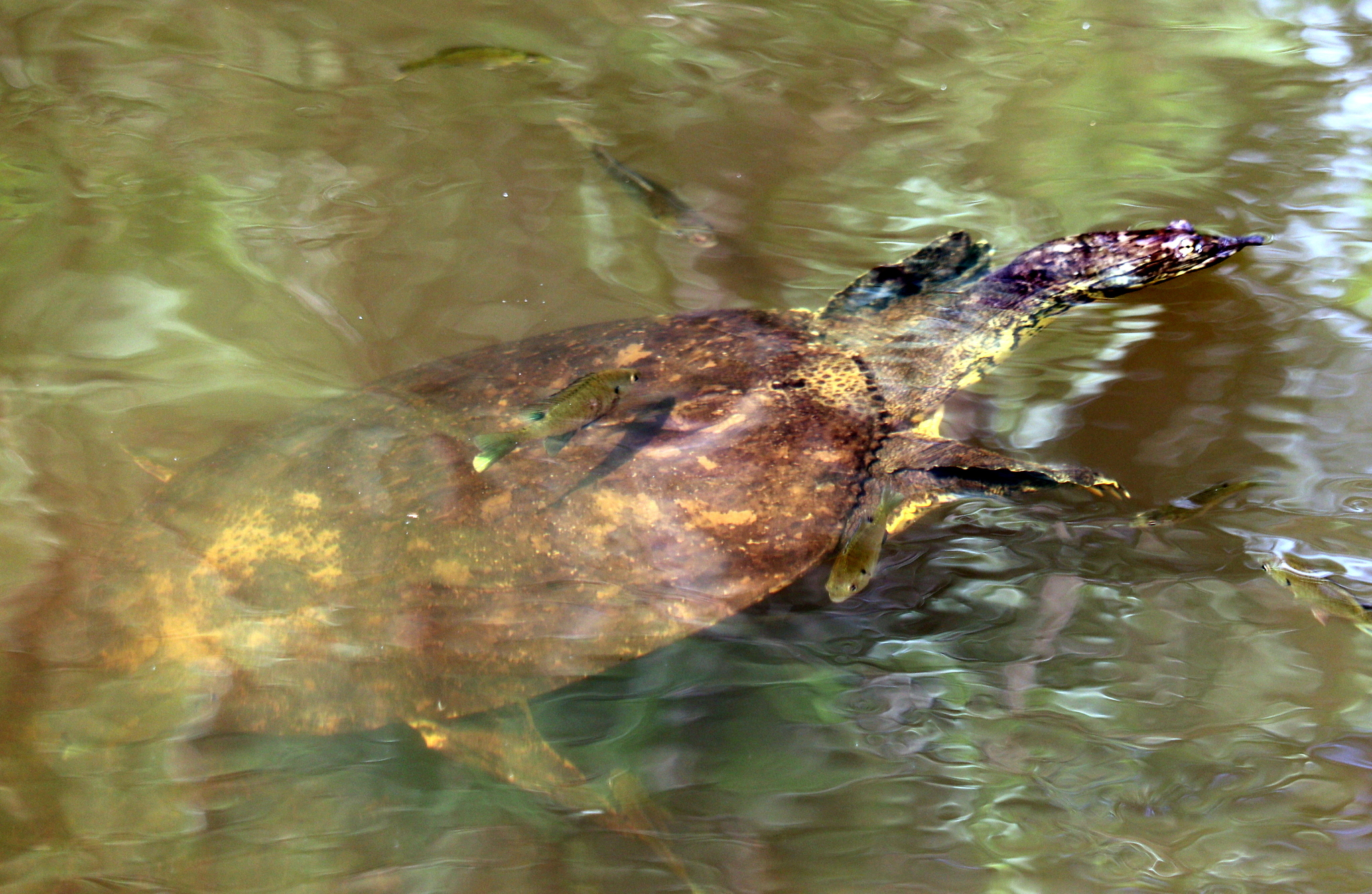

Conservation status
- Secure (NatureServe)

Scientific classification
- Domain: Eukaryota
- Kingdom: Animalia
- Phylum: Chordata
- Class: Reptilia
- Order: Testudines
- Suborder: Cryptodira
- Family: Trionychidae
- Genus: Apalone
- Species: A. spinifera
- Subspecies: A. s. aspera

Trinomial name
- Apalone spinifera aspera Agassiz, 1857

Synonyms
- Aspidonectes asper Agassiz, 1857; Platypeltis agassizii Baur, 1888; Trionyx agassizii – O.P. Hay, 1892; Pelodiscus agassizii – Baur, 1893; Platypeltis asper – Baur, 1893; Aspidonectes agassizi – Jordan, 1899 (ex errore); Trionyx spiniferus agassizii – Siebenrock, 1924; Amyda agassizii – Stejneger & Barbour, 1939; Amyda spinifera aspera – Stejneger & Barbour, 1939; Amyda ferox agassizii – Neill, 1951; Amyda ferox aspera Neill, 1951; Trionyx ferox agassizi – Schmidt, 1953; Trionyx ferox aspera – Schmidt, 1953; Trionyx spinifer asper – Schwartz, 1956; Trionyx spiniferus asper – Wermuth & Mertens, 1961; Trionyx spiniferus asperus – Zappalorti, 1976; Trionyx spiniferous asperus – Anderson, 1985; Apalone spinifera asper – Ernst & Barbour, 1989; Apalone spinifera asper – Stubbs, 1989; Apalone spinifera aspera – Iverson, Meylan, Pritchard, Seidel & Ward, 1990

= Gulf Coast spiny softshell turtle =

Subspecies of turtle

The Gulf Coast spiny softshell turtle (Apalone spinifera aspera), a subspecies in the Trionychidae family of softshell turtles, is endemic to the south-eastern United States.

== Geographic range ==
Gulf coast spiny soft shell turtles are found along the Gulf of Mexico and the Atlantic coast from North Carolina to Mississippi. They live in temperate climates in freshwater biomes.

== Description ==
Apalone spinifera aspera differs from other subspecies of Apalone spinifera in having two or more black lines running along the posterior border of the carapace. It also has scattered ocelli or ring-shaped spots on the carapace, which may be obscure in adult females. The edges of the carapace are soft with small spines. The head and neck usually have yellow and brown stripes and spot-like markings that lead up to a long upward pointed nose. The underbelly is whitish or yellow with bones visible underneath. The body is olive or tan with black speckles and a dark rim around the edge of their shell. Adult males have olive and yellow coloration on their carapaces, with black "eyespots", and a thicker tail than females. Males are also smaller than females, with a shell length of 12.7 to 24 cm. Females are 24 to 48 cm in length, with a dark carapace and a small tail that doesn't go beyond the edge of their carapace. Their feet are webbed for swimming, with their toes ending in claws. Large females can live upwards of 50 years.

== Habitat ==
Gulf coast spiny soft shell turtles inhabit various freshwater sources such as rivers, lakes, marshes, farm ponds, as well as bays of larger lakes. They prefer open habitats with a small amount of vegetation and a sandy or muddy bottom. They require sandy raised nesting areas close to water.

== Behavior ==
These turtles are diurnal animals, spending most of the day basking in the sun and foraging for food. They are often seen sunning themselves on logs, river banks, or lake shores. If disturbed, they will quickly retreat into the water and bury themselves in sand, leaving only their heads visible. Like most turtles, they are able to breathe underwater for extended periods of time. They will spend the colder months underwater, buried in the mud or sand in a state of dormancy. When bothered, spiny softshell turtles will extend their long necks and snap viciously at their attacker, inflicting a painful bite.

== Diet ==
Spiny softshell turtles are carnivores preying mostly on invertebrates, such as, crayfish and aquatic insects. When they are large enough they will occasionally prey upon small fish. They find their food underneath rocks, logs, branches, along the floor of lakes, rivers, and streams, and in vegetation. They will sometimes hide in the floor substrate and ambush prey as it swims by.

=== Predators ===
Spiny softshell turtles have few natural predators including, large predatory fish, raccoons, herons, skunks, red foxes, and occasionally humans. Their nests are often destroyed by raccoons, skunks, and foxes. Young softshell turtles are eaten by raccoons, herons, and large fish; adults, on the other hand, are killed and eaten only by humans. Being shy creatures they will quickly dive and hide under mud and sand to avoid predators.
