= Sceloporus taeniocnemis =

Conservation status
- Least Concern (IUCN 3.1)

Scientific classification
- Kingdom: Animalia
- Phylum: Chordata
- Class: Reptilia
- Order: Squamata
- Suborder: Iguania
- Family: Phrynosomatidae
- Genus: Sceloporus
- Species: S. taeniocnemis

Binomial name
- Sceloporus taeniocnemis Cope, 1885

Synonyms
- Sceloporus taeniocnemis Cope, 1885; Sceloporus malachiticus taeniocnemis — H.M. Smith & Taylor, 1950; Sceloporus taeniocnemis — Liner, 1994

Species of lizard

Sceloporus taeniocnemis, also known commonly as the Guatemalan emerald spiny lizard and la chachapaja in Spanish, is a species of lizard in the family Phrynosomatidae. The species is native to Guatemala and adjacent southeastern Mexico. There are two recognized subspecies.

== Geographic range ==
S. taeniocnemis is found in central Guatemala and in the Mexican state of Chiapas.

== Habitat ==
The preferred natural habitat of S. taeniocnemis is forest, at altitudes of 1,200–2,500 m (3,900–8,200 ft).

== Reproduction ==
S. taeniocnemis is viviparous.

== Subspecies ==
The following two subspecies are recognized as being valid, including the nominotypical subspecies.

- Sceloporus taeniocnemis taeniocnemis Cope, 1885
- Sceloporus taeniocnemis hartwegi Stuart, 1971

== Etymology ==
The subspecific name, hartwegi, is in honor of American herpetologist Norman Edouard Hartweg.
