= Robert G. Webb =

American herpetologist (1927–2018)

- Born: Robert Gravem Webb; February 18, 1927; Long Beach, California, U.S.
- Died: September 18, 2018 (aged 91); San Angelo, Texas, U.S.
- Education: UCLA, University of Oklahoma, University of Kansas
- Known for: Herpetology
- Spouse: Patricia Ann Peden
- Scientific career
- Workplaces: University of Texas at El Paso

Robert Gravem Webb (February 18, 1927 – September 18, 2018) was an American herpetologist, expert in the systematics and biogeography of reptiles and amphibians, and professor emeritus of biological science at the University of Texas at El Paso.

Webb received his Ph.D. in zoology from the University of Kansas in 1960.

Webb had over a hundred publications to his name. He specialized in amphibians and reptiles of the southwestern United States and Mexico.

The snake Lampropeltis webbi is named after him.

== See also ==
- Category:Taxa named by Robert G. Webb
