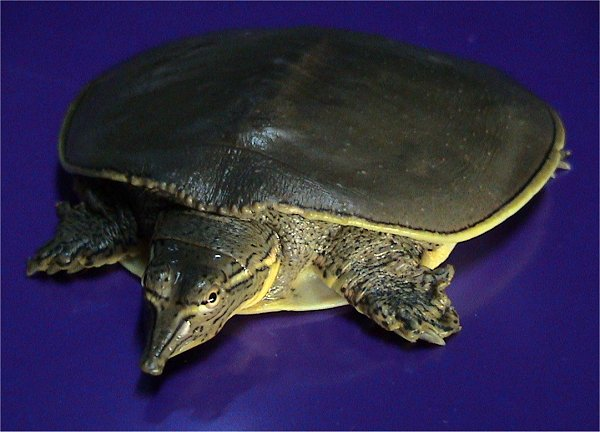
- Spiny softshell turtle, Apalone spinifera

Scientific classification
- Kingdom: Animalia
- Phylum: Chordata
- Class: Reptilia
- Order: Testudines
- Suborder: Cryptodira
- Family: Trionychidae
- Subfamily: Trionychinae
- Genus: Apalone; Rafinesque, 1832

Species
- 3 recognized species, see article.

Synonyms
- Mesodeca Rafinesque, 1832; Platypeltis Fitzinger, 1835; Glalypeltis Cope, 1860 (ex errore); Callinia Gray, 1869; Euamyda Stejneger, 1944; Platyrettis Kirsch, 1944 (ex errore)

= Apalone =

Apalone Temporal range: Late Miocene - recent, 12–0 Ma Possible Eocene and Late Cretaceous occurrence

Genus of turtles

Apalone is a genus of turtles in the family Trionychidae. The three species of Apalone are native to freshwater habitats in North America; they are the only living softshell turtles from the Americas (other American softshell turtles are only known from fossil remains).

== Geographic range ==
Most Apalone species are restricted to the United States, though the range of the spiny softshell, A. spinifera, extends into southern Canada and northern Mexico.

Fossil evidence suggests that Apalone may have reached as far south as Costa Rica during the Pliocene.

== Taxonomy ==
Apalone is a fairly new classification, resurrected by Meylan in 1987, assigned to North American species of the genus Trionyx. They are still listed as Trionyx in some texts. (Trionyx now refers specifically to certain softshell species found mainly in Africa.)

Molecular phylogenetic studies generally suggest that Apalone is most closely related to the highly endangered Asian genus Rafetus, with the two genera most likely diverging during the Late Eocene. The ancestral Apalone most likely crossed from Asia into North America via Beringia, taking advantage of the warm climate during the Eocene.

=== Species ===
The following three species are recognized as being valid.

- Apalone ferox (Schneider, 1783) – Florida softshell turtle - South Carolina, Georgia, Florida, and Alabama
- Apalone mutica (Lesueur, 1827) – smooth softshell turtle - United States, east of the Rocky Mountains
- Apalone spinifera (Lesueur, 1827) – spiny softshell turtle - Canada (southern Ontario and Quebec), most of the United States, and northeastern Mexico.

Nota bene: A binomial authority in parentheses indicates that the species was originally described in a genus other than Apalone.

==== Fossil taxa ====
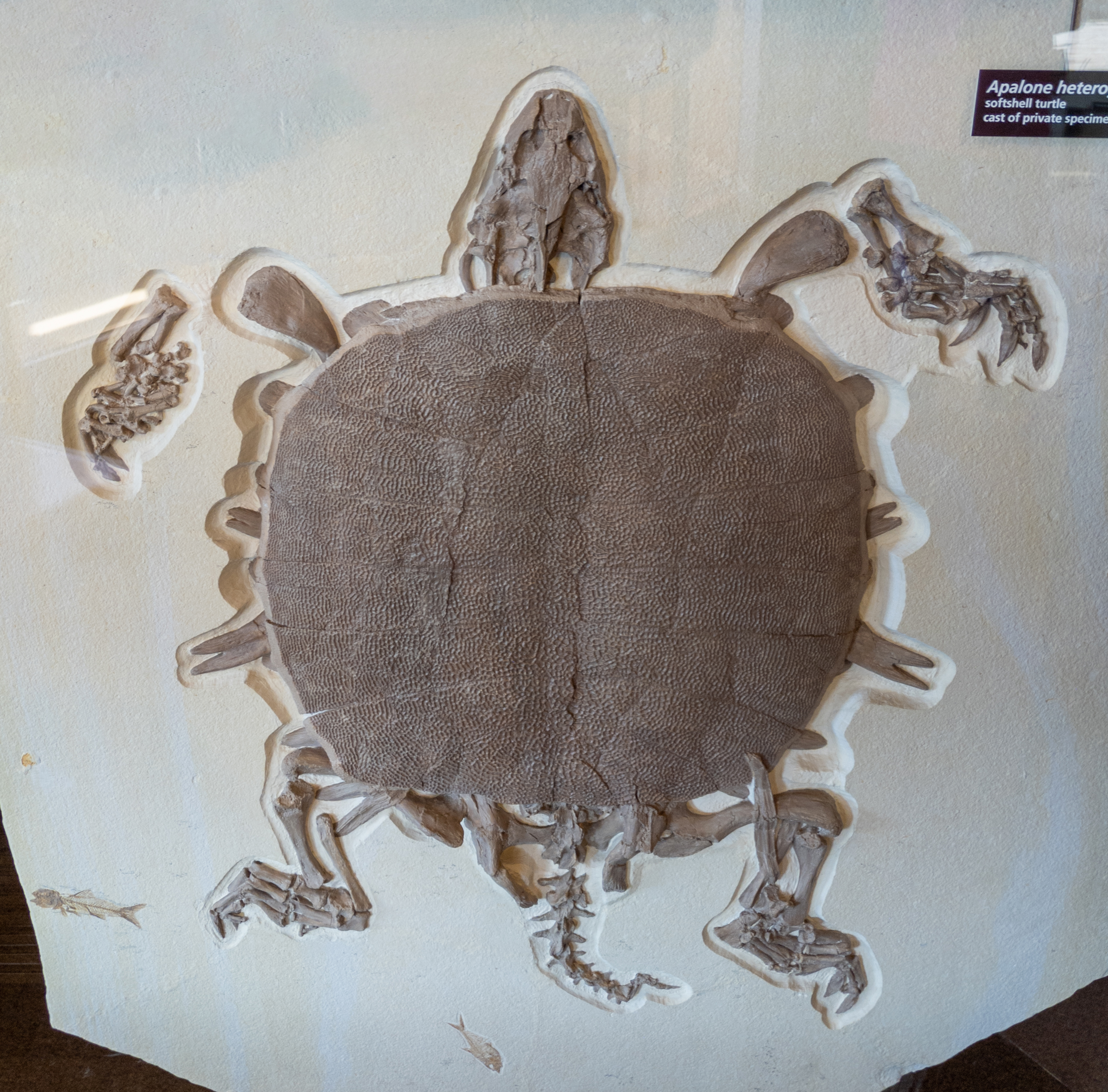
A. heteroglypta fossil

One definitive fossil species is also known, A. amorense Valdes, Bourque & Vitek, 2017 from the late Miocene (late Clarendonian) of Florida (Alachua Formation).

In addition, two other potential fossil species, generally placed in "Trionyx" sensu lato, may belong to Apalone: Apalone latus (Gilmore, 1919) from the Campanian-aged Dinosaur Park Formation of Alberta, Canada and Apalone leucopotamica (Cope, 1891) from the late Eocene-aged Cypress Hills Formation of Saskatchewan. These two species are much older than any other remains assigned to Apalone, and even predate the presumed divergence of the genus based on molecular phylogenies. However, none of these have been rigorously tested, and the placement of these genera within Apalone may just be a result of homoplasy.

== Sexual dimorphism ==
Turtles of the genus Apalone exhibit marked sexual dimorphism. In carapace length, females grow to about twice the size of males. In males, the claws on the front feet are longer than those on the back feet, but in females, the claws on the back feet are longer. In males, the stout tail extends well beyond the posterior edge of the carapace, but in females, the relatively thinner tail barely reaches the edge of the carapace.

== Behavior ==
Apalone turtles are fast swimmers that chase down their prey in water. They feed mainly on fish. They also like the comfort of sand as their bedding.
