= Sceloporus occidentalis biseriatus =

San Joaquin fence lizard

Scientific classification
- Kingdom: Animalia
- Phylum: Chordata
- Class: Reptilia
- Order: Squamata
- Suborder: Iguania
- Family: Phrynosomatidae
- Genus: Sceloporus
- Species: S. occidentalis
- Subspecies: S. o. biseriatus

Trinomial name
- Sceloporus occidentalis biseriatus Hallowell, 1854

Subspecies of lizard

Sceloporus occidentalis biseriatus is a subspecies of the western fence lizard. The common name of S.o. biseriatus is the San Joaquin fence lizard. There are several subspecies of the western fence lizard, all of which are found in the far western part of North America.

== See also ==
- Coast Range fence lizard
- Island fence lizard
- Northwestern fence lizard
