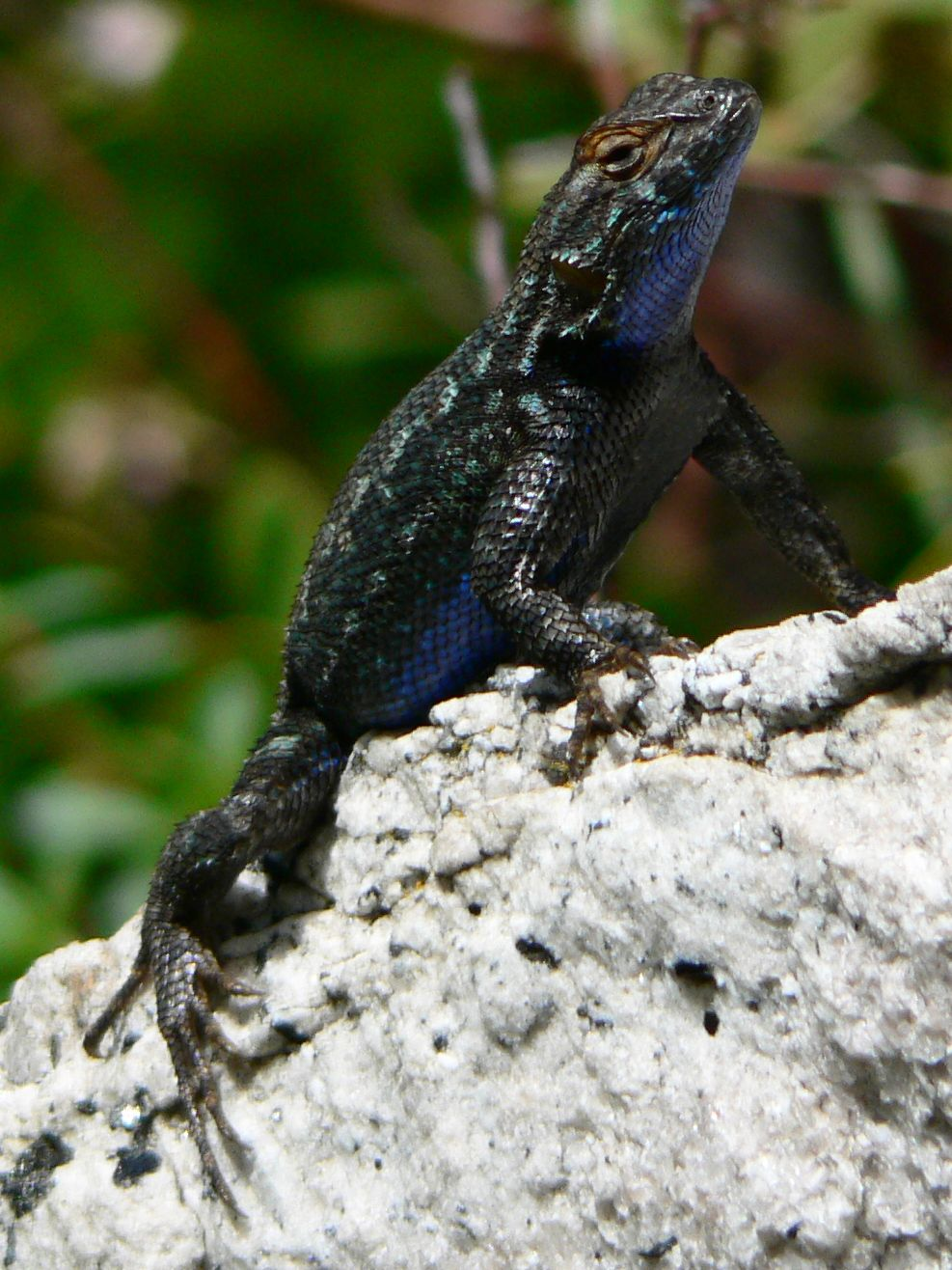

Scientific classification
- Kingdom: Animalia
- Phylum: Chordata
- Class: Reptilia
- Order: Squamata
- Suborder: Iguania
- Family: Phrynosomatidae
- Genus: Sceloporus
- Species: S. occidentalis
- Subspecies: S. o. taylori

Trinomial name
- Sceloporus occidentalis taylori Camp, 1916

= Sceloporus occidentalis taylori =

Sierra fence lizard

Subspecies of lizard

Sceloporus occidentalis taylori is a subspecies of the western fence lizard, commonly called the Sierra fence lizard. Several subspecies of the western fence lizard, a species of phrynosomatid lizard, are found in the far western part of North America. The subspecific epithet, taylori, is in honor of American herpetologist Edward Harrison Taylor.

== See also ==
- Coast Range fence lizard
- Island fence lizard
- Northwestern fence lizard

== Bibliography ==
- Hobart M. Smith (1995) Handbook of Lizards: Lizards of the United States and of Canada, Cornell University Press, 557 pages ISBN 0-8014-8236-4
- C. Michael Hogan (2008) "Western fence lizard (Sceloporus occidentalis)", Globaltwitcher, ed. Nicklas Stromberg
