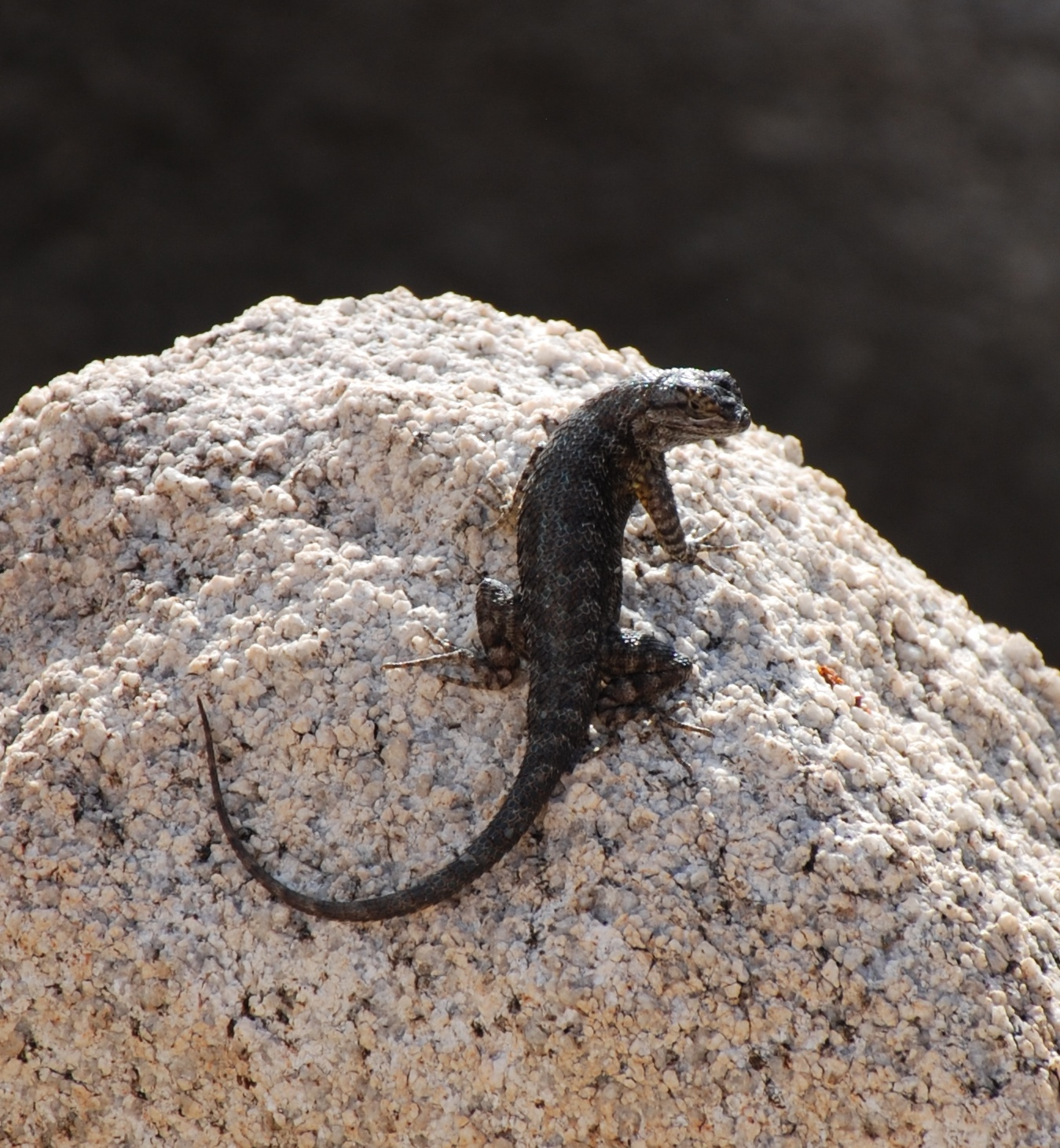

Scientific classification
- Kingdom: Animalia
- Phylum: Chordata
- Class: Reptilia
- Order: Squamata
- Suborder: Iguania
- Family: Phrynosomatidae
- Genus: Sceloporus
- Species: S. occidentalis
- Subspecies: S. o. longipes

Trinomial name
- Sceloporus occidentalis longipes Baird, 1859

= Sceloporus occidentalis longipes =

Great Basin fence lizard

Subspecies of lizard

Sceloporus occidentalis longipes is a subspecies of the western fence lizard, commonly called the Great Basin fence lizard. Several subspecies of the western fence lizard, a species of phrynosomatid lizard, are found in the far western part of North America.

== Gallery ==
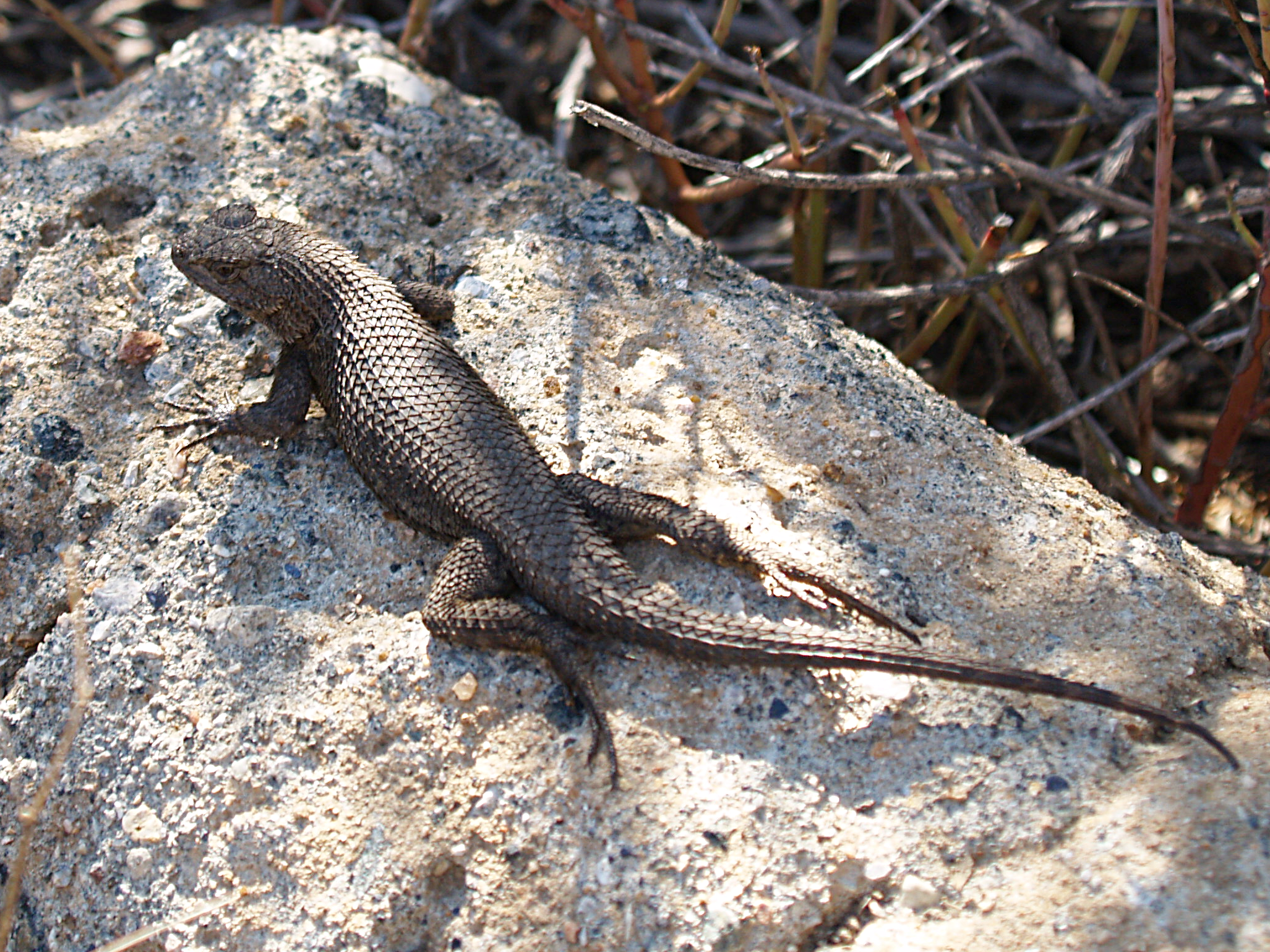
Adult, Malibu, California

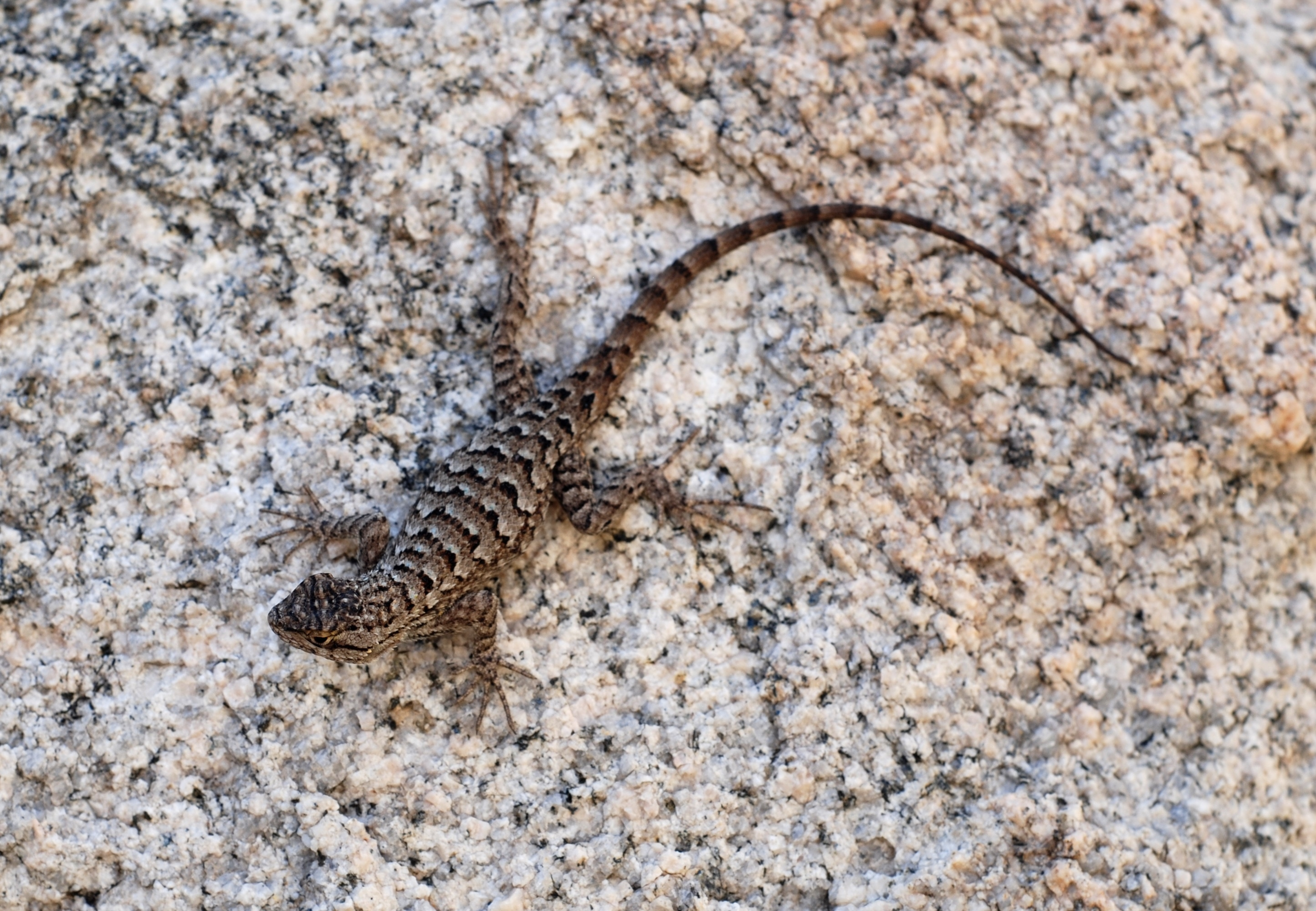
Adult, Joshua Tree National Park

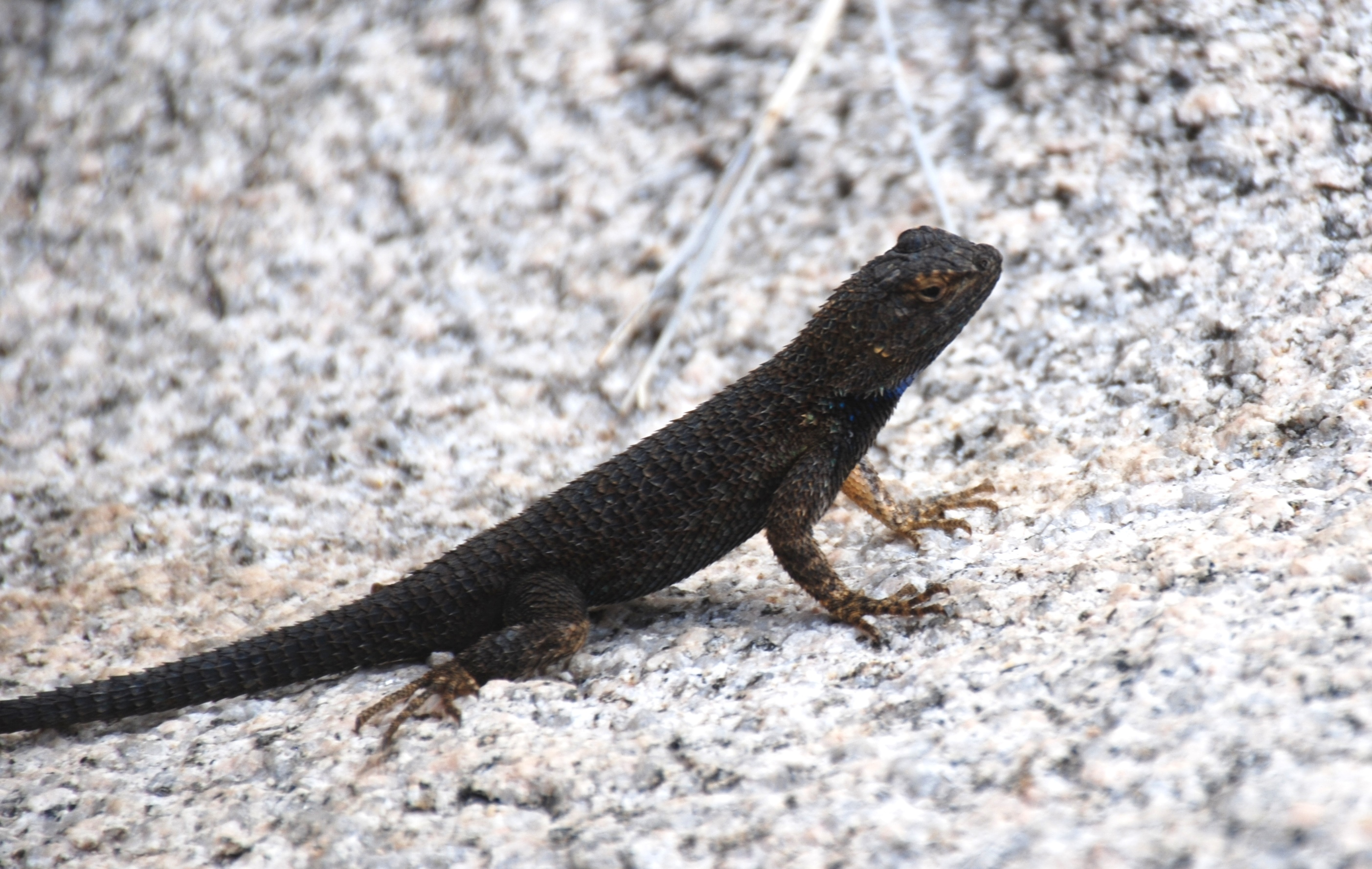
Adult, Joshua Tree National Park

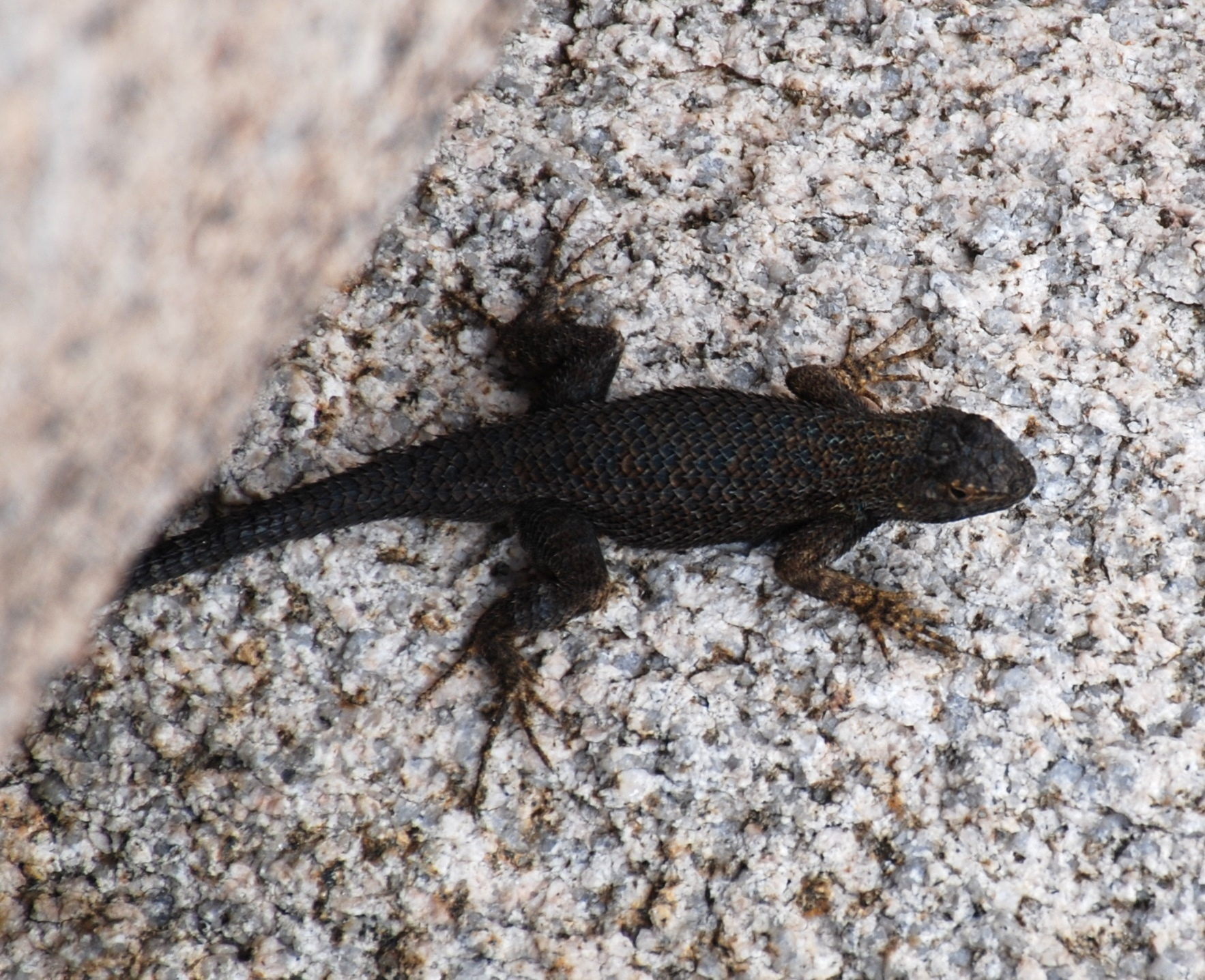
Adult, Joshua Tree National Park

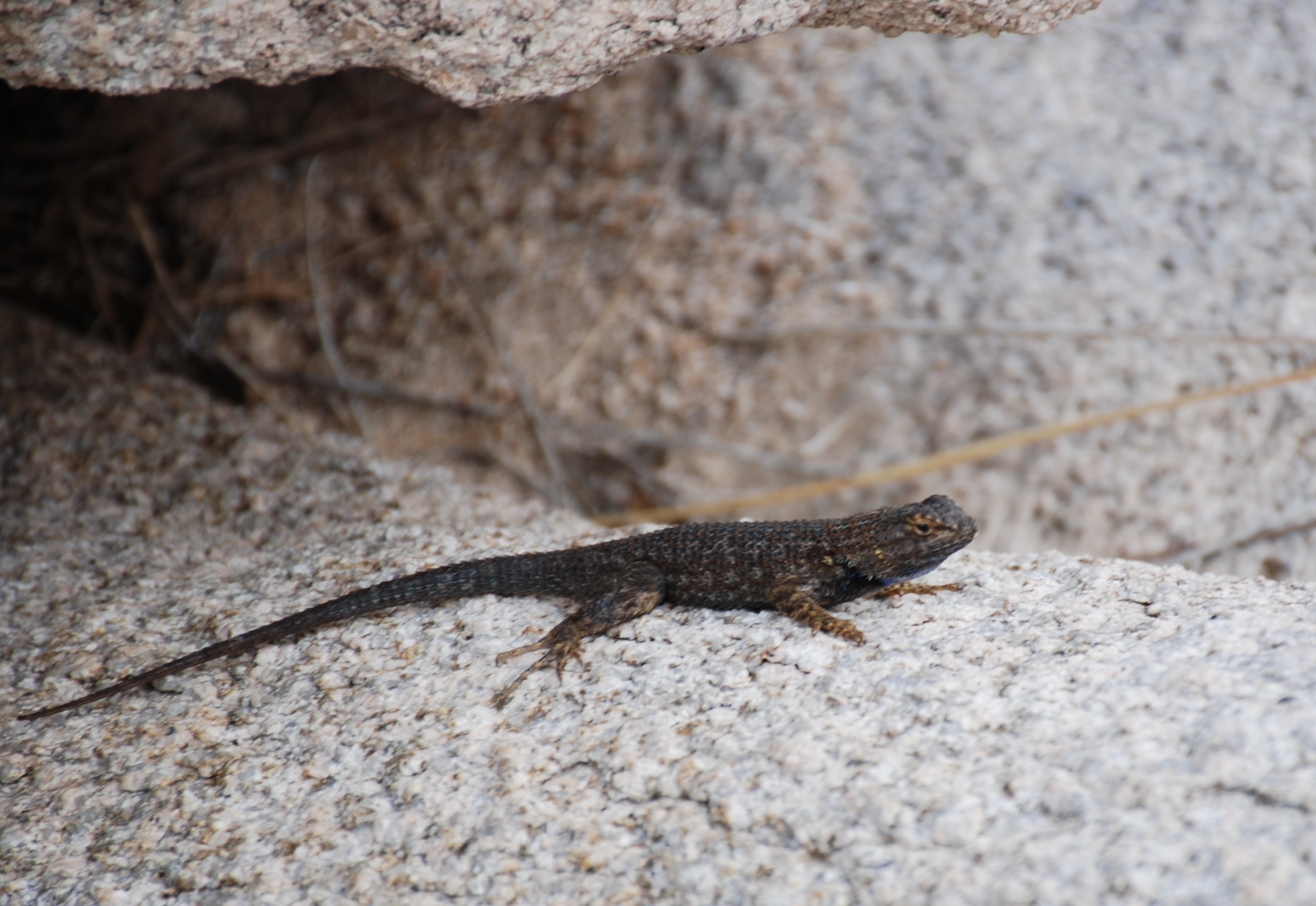
Adult, Joshua Tree National Park

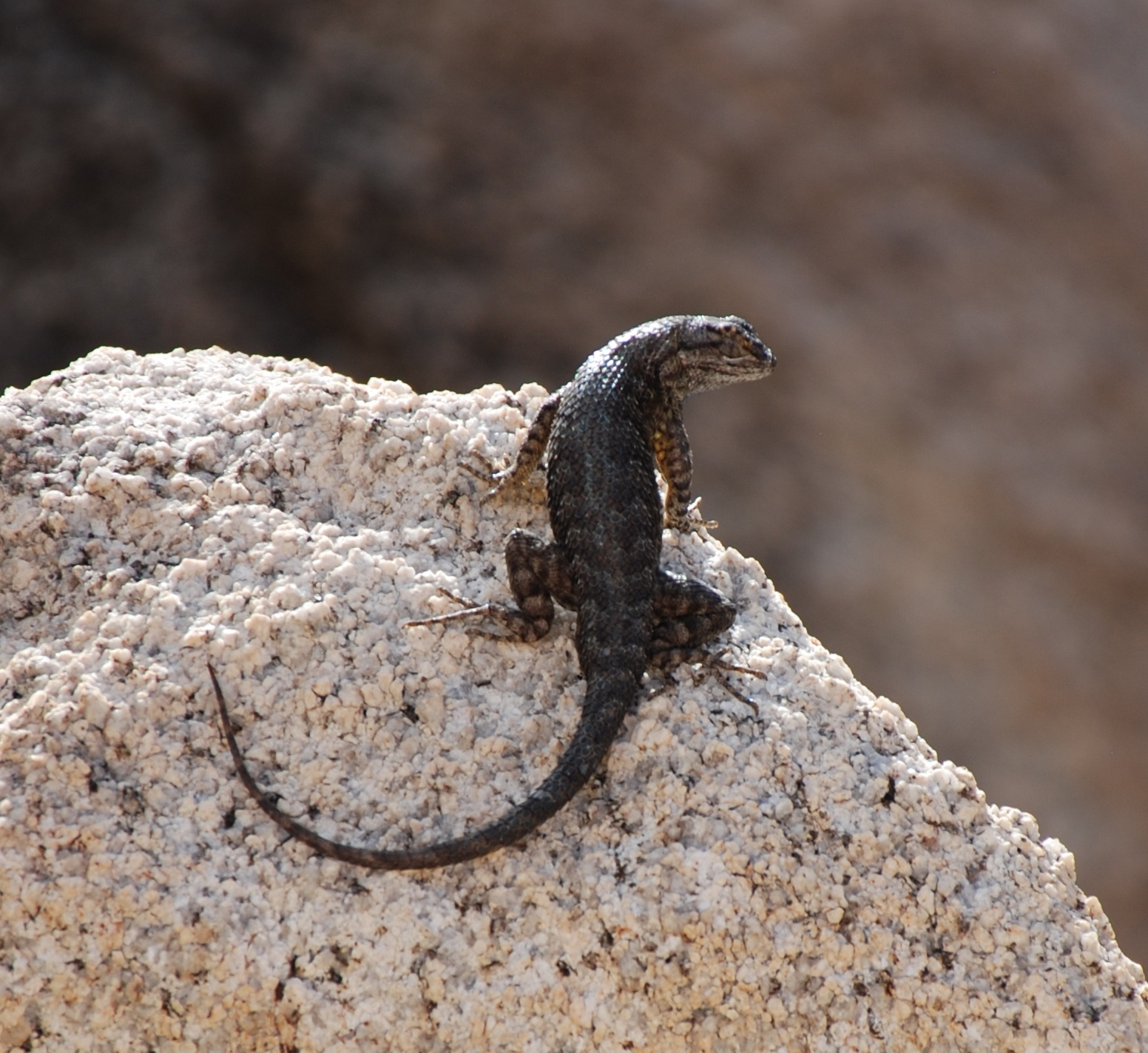
Adult, Joshua Tree National Park

== See also ==
- Coast Range fence lizard
- Island fence lizard
- Northwestern fence lizard
