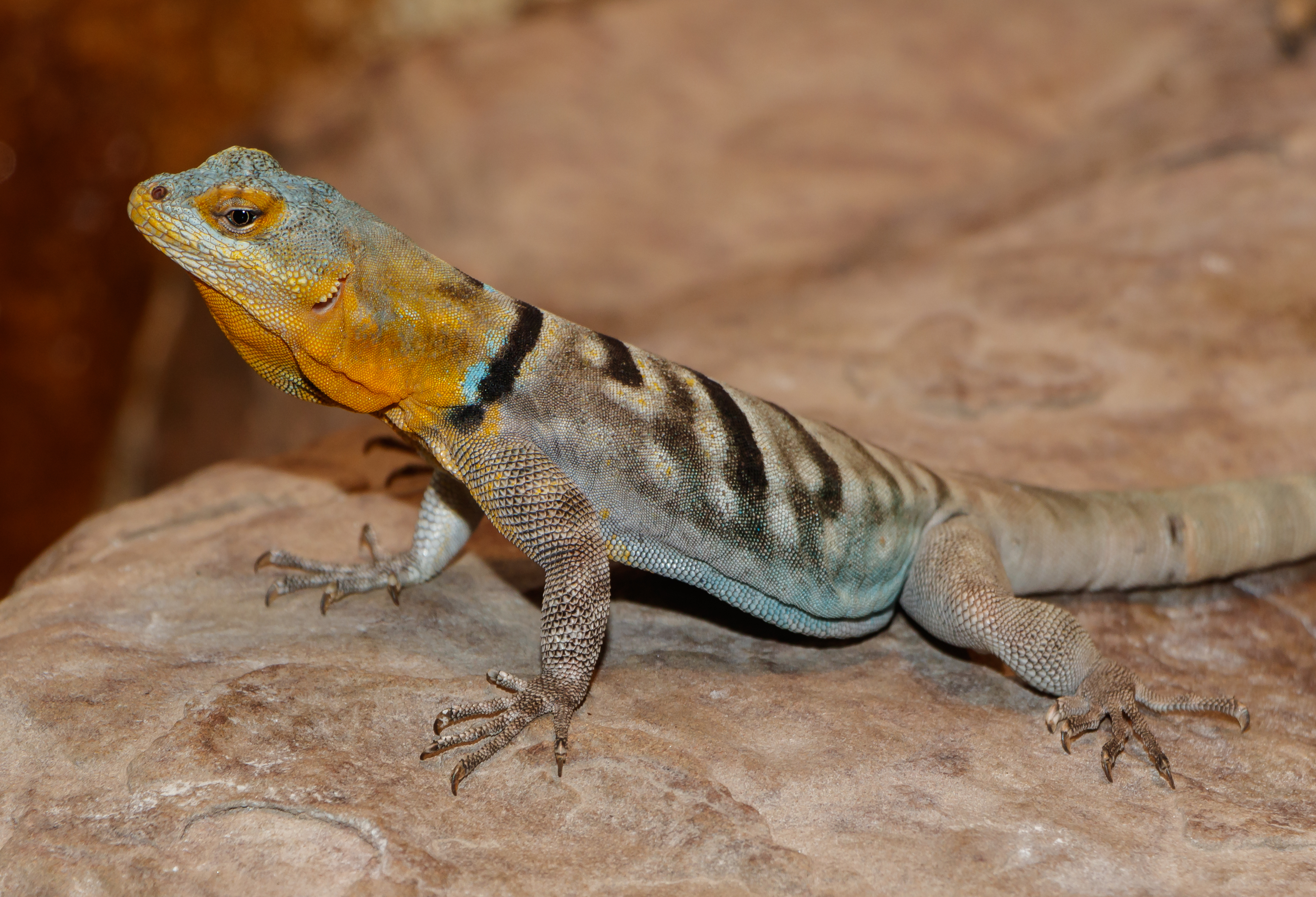

Conservation status
- Least Concern (IUCN 3.1)

Scientific classification
- Kingdom: Animalia
- Phylum: Chordata
- Class: Reptilia
- Order: Squamata
- Suborder: Iguania
- Family: Phrynosomatidae
- Genus: Petrosaurus
- Species: P. thalassinus

Binomial name
- Petrosaurus thalassinus (Cope, 1863)

Synonyms
- Uta thalassina Cope, 1863; Petrosaurus thalassinus - Boulenger, 1885

= Baja blue rock lizard =

Species of lizard

The Baja blue rock lizard (Petrosaurus thalassinus) is a species of large, diurnal phrynosomatid lizard.

== Description ==
It reaches up to 45 cm (18 in) long including the tail, and has a flattened body with small, smooth, granular scales and slightly keeled scales near the tail. The head is bluish with red to orange colors around the eyes, yellow neck with blue spots and streaks. The back of the tail is gray blue with darker cross bars. The coloration intensifies during the breeding season in both sexes.

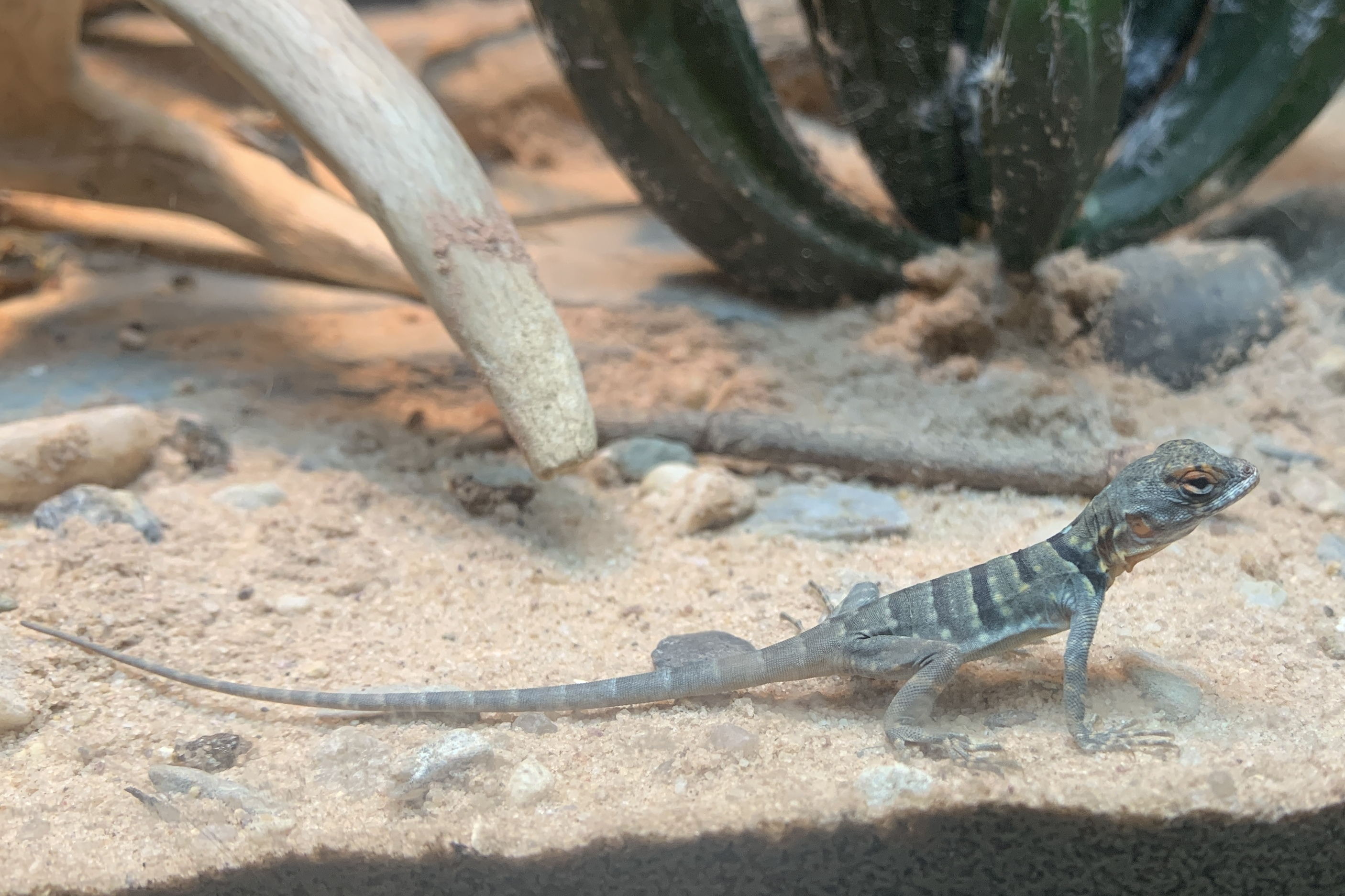
Baby, Bronx Zoo

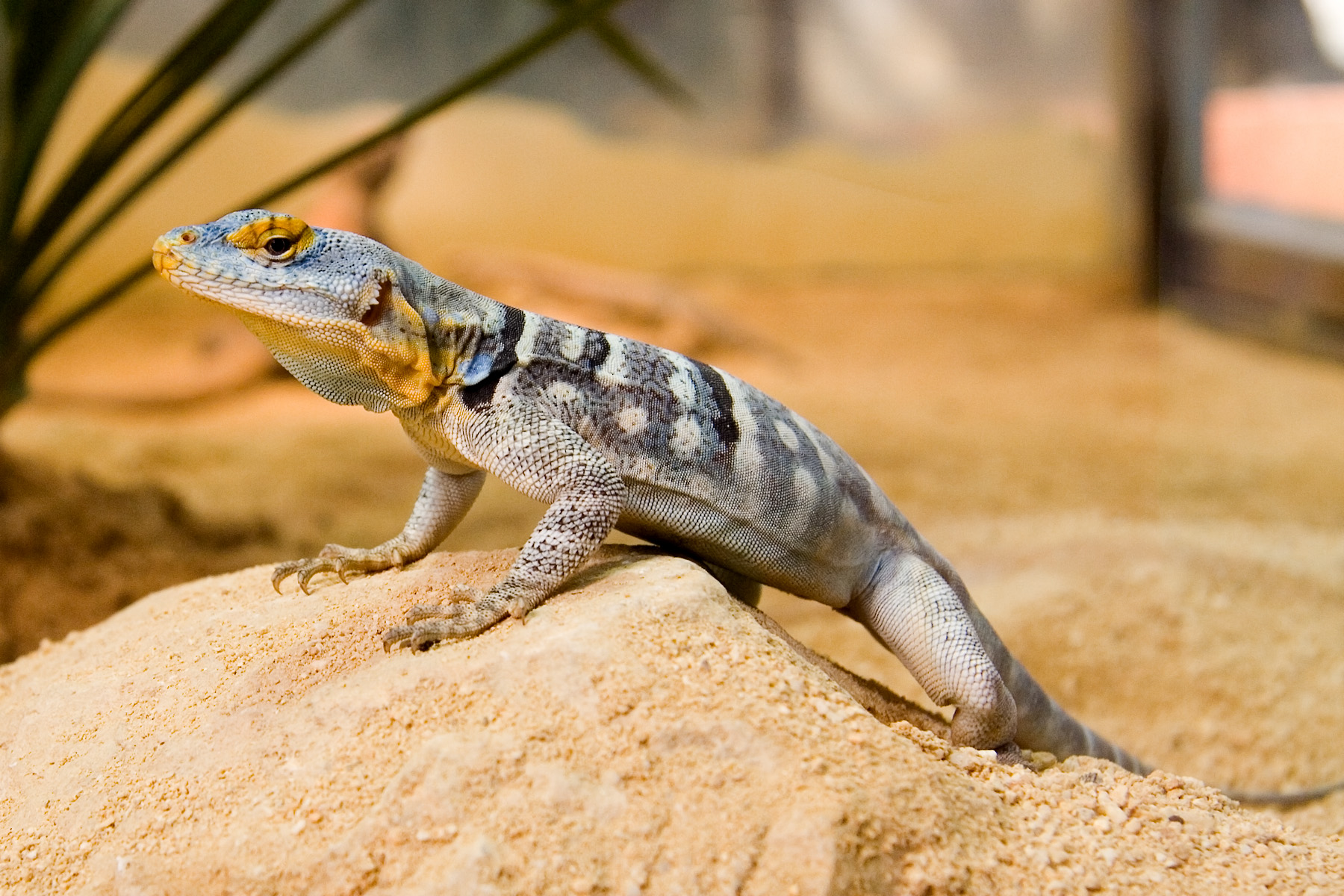
Adult, Frankfurt Zoo

== Behavior ==
It prefers temperatures in excess of 90 °F (32 °C) and basks in direct sunlight on desert rocks. A very wary species, its flattened body allows it to quickly retreat into rock crevices to escape predators as well as inclement weather conditions. When threatened, it can extend a skin flap along its throat. Like many lizards, it is able to drop its tail when caught.

== Diet ==
It feeds on various insects, small lizards, blossoms, leaves, seeds, and small fruit. Occasional incidents of cannibalism on smaller individuals have been observed.

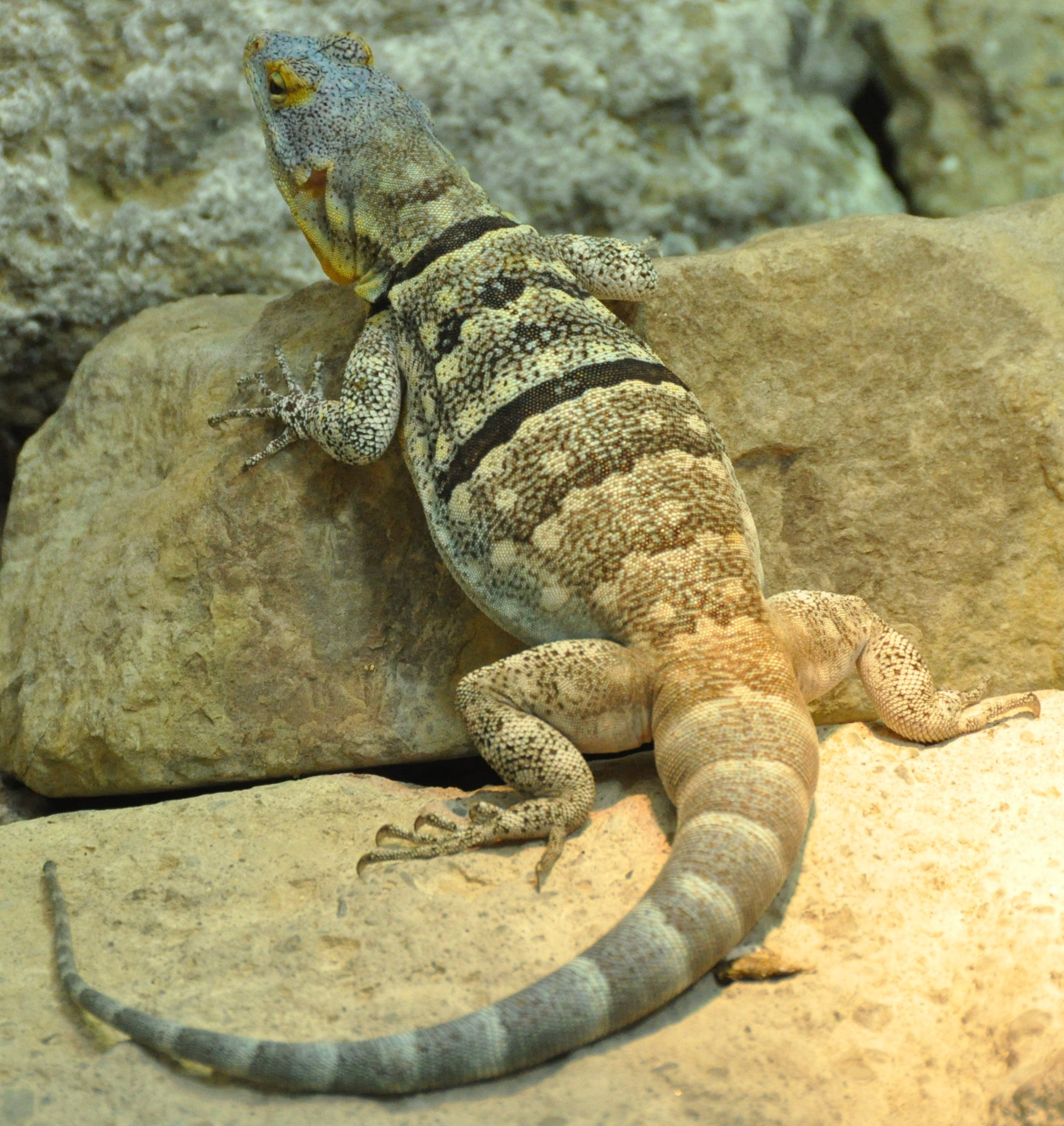
Baja blue rock lizard

== Taxonomy ==
Two subspecies are recognized within P. thalassinus; P. t. thalassinus inhabits the Cape region, and P. t. repens ranges north of the isthmus of La Paz. P. t. repens differs by having a thin, black, postorbital stripe; one row of scales between the nasal and the supralabials as opposed to two, and reaching a maximum snout-to-vent length of 111 mm (4.4 in) as opposed to 162 mm (6.4 in). Genetic studies indicate all populations within P. thalassinus, including the two subspecies, show only low levels of genetic divergence, indicative of high rates of gene flow. In contrast, P. thalassinus is strongly differentiated from its sister species P. mearnsi.

== Life history ==
Breeding takes place in the spring. 20 to 30 eggs are laid in late spring and summer, and hatchlings appear after 85 to 88 days in summer and early fall. Sexual maturity is reached after about 2 years with a life expectancy of 20 years.

== Habitat ==
Petrosaurus thalassinus is most often found in the immediate vicinity of rocky canyons, boulder-strewn hillsides and arroyo bottoms and sea-side cliffs. These lizards appear to be particularly common on rocks near large trees or other vegetation, and rarely seen in areas where vegetation is non-existent.

== Geographic range ==
It is found in the Sierra la Laguna (and its associated ranges) and Sierra la Trinidad of the Cape region of Baja California Sur, as well as on Islas Espiritu Santo and Partida Sur in the Gulf. Elevational distribution from sea level to 2,020 meters (6,630 ft) in the Sierra la Laguna.

== Conservation ==
This species is locally abundant and occurs on several protected islands. It is currently in no need of special protection. However, its small range may make it vulnerable to disturbance.
