= Banded rock lizard =

There are two species of lizard named banded rock lizard:

- Petrosaurus mearnsi, native to western North America
- Petrosaurus slevini, from Mexico
