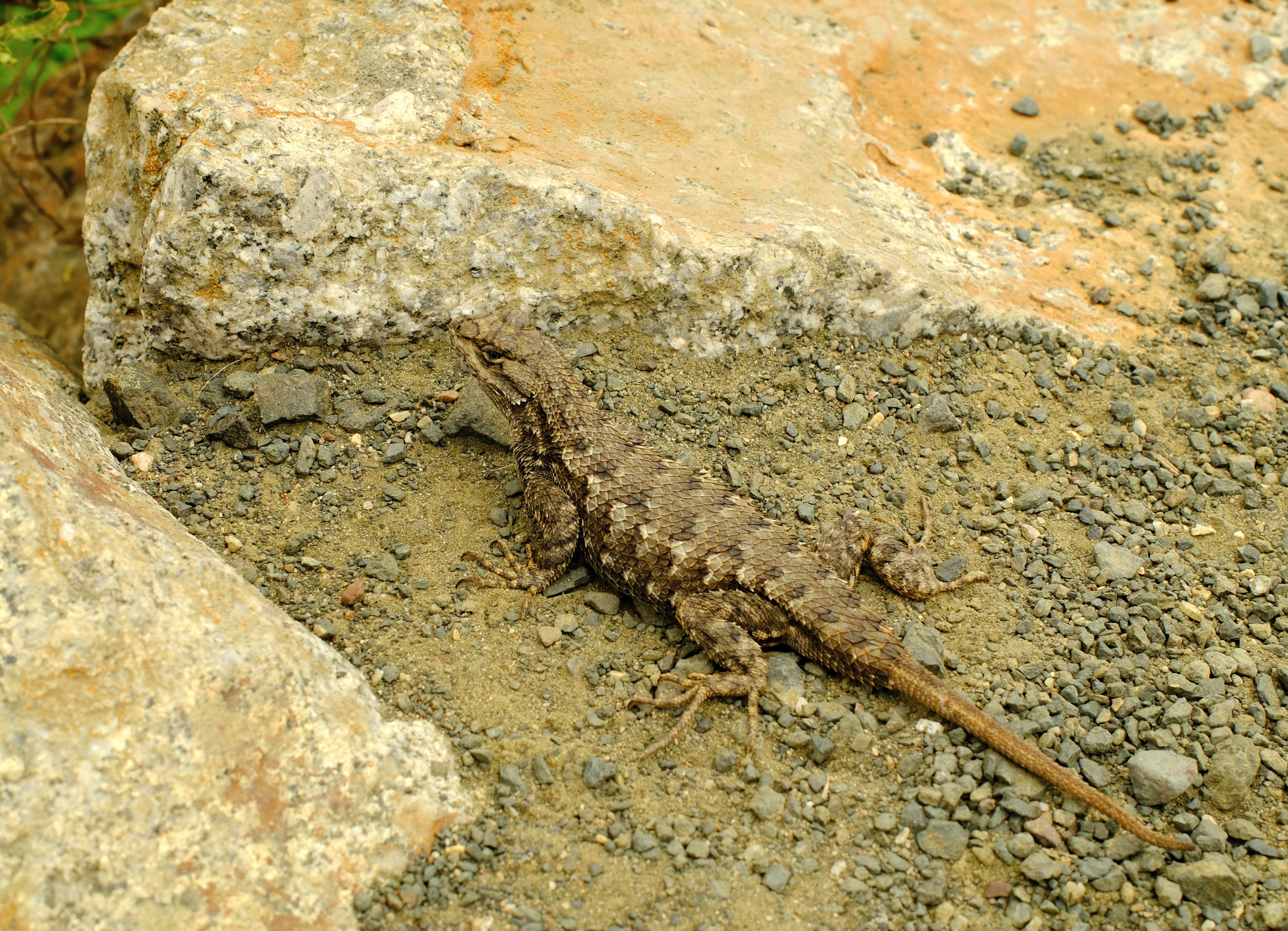

Scientific classification
- Kingdom: Animalia
- Phylum: Chordata
- Class: Reptilia
- Order: Squamata
- Suborder: Iguania
- Family: Phrynosomatidae
- Genus: Sceloporus
- Species: S. occidentalis
- Subspecies: S. o. bocourtii

Trinomial name
- Sceloporus occidentalis bocourtii Boulenger, 1885

Synonyms
- Sceloporus undulatus Var. bocourtii Boulenger, 1885; Sceloporus occidentalis bocourtii — E. Bell, 1954

= Sceloporus occidentalis bocourtii =

Subspecies of lizard

Sceloporus occidentalis bocourtii, commonly known as the Coast Range fence lizard, is a subspecies of Sceloporus occidentalis, the Western fence lizard.

== Geographic range ==
This taxon, S. o. bocourtii, is found in the state of California, from Sonoma County south to Santa Barbara County.

== Taxonomy ==
The subspecies S. o. bocourtii is in the family Phrynosomatidae, North American spiny lizards.

== Etymology ==
The subspecific name, bocourtii, is in honor of French herpetologist Marie Firmin Bocourt.

== See also ==
- Great Basin fence lizard
- Island fence lizard
- Northwestern fence lizard
- Sierra fence lizard
