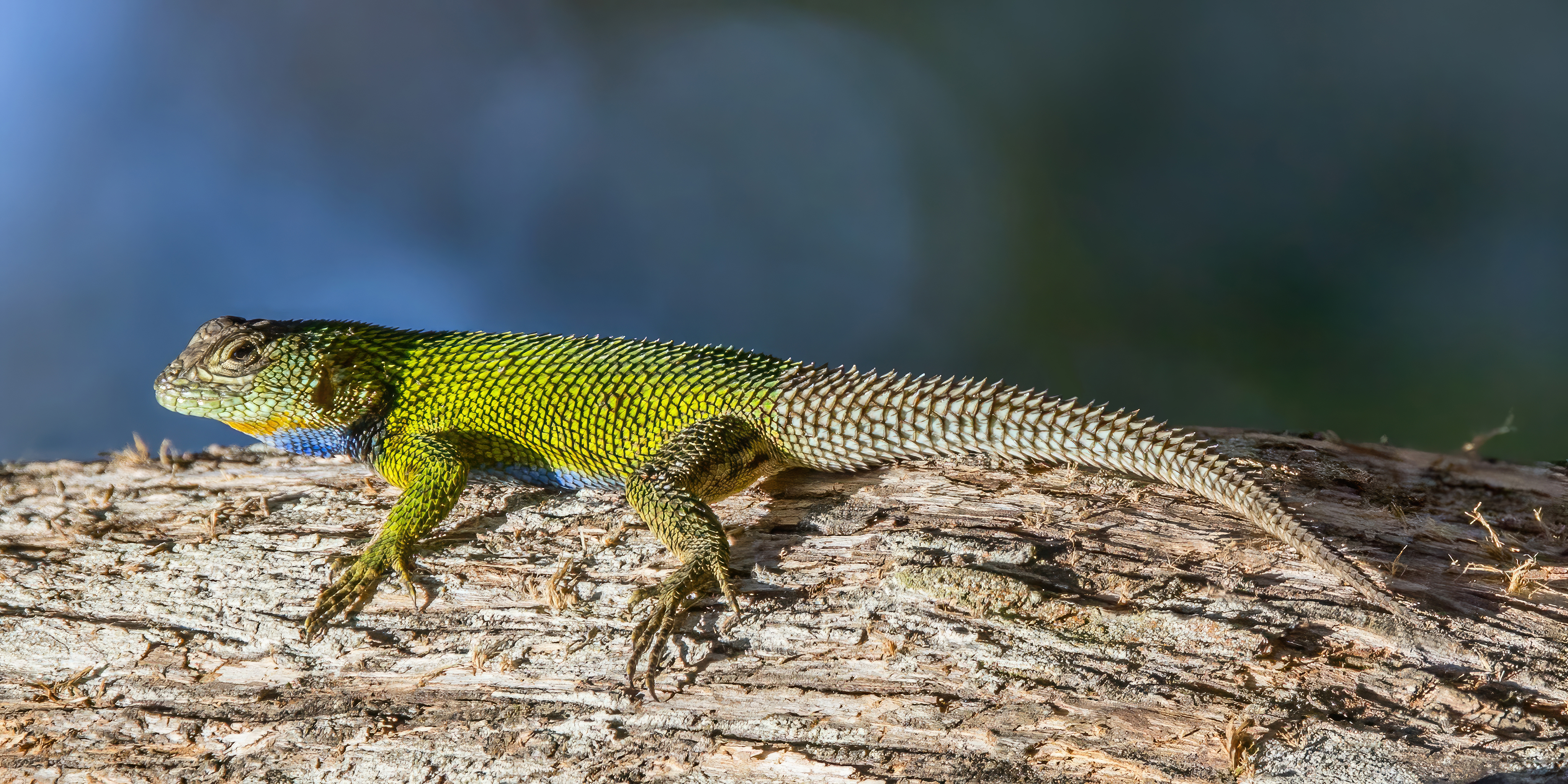
- In Antigua Guatemala

Conservation status
- Least Concern (IUCN 3.1)

Scientific classification
- Kingdom: Animalia
- Phylum: Chordata
- Class: Reptilia
- Order: Squamata
- Suborder: Iguania
- Family: Phrynosomatidae
- Genus: Sceloporus
- Species: S. malachiticus

Binomial name
- Sceloporus malachiticus Cope, 1864

Synonyms
- Sceloporus irazuensis Günther, 1890; Sceloporus formosus malachiticus H.M. Smith, 1939; Sceloporus malachiticus F. Schmidt et al., 1999

= Sceloporus malachiticus =

Emerald swift

Species of lizard

Sceloporus malachiticus, the emerald swift or green spiny lizard, is a species of small lizard in the Phrynosomatidae family, native to Central America.

== Description ==
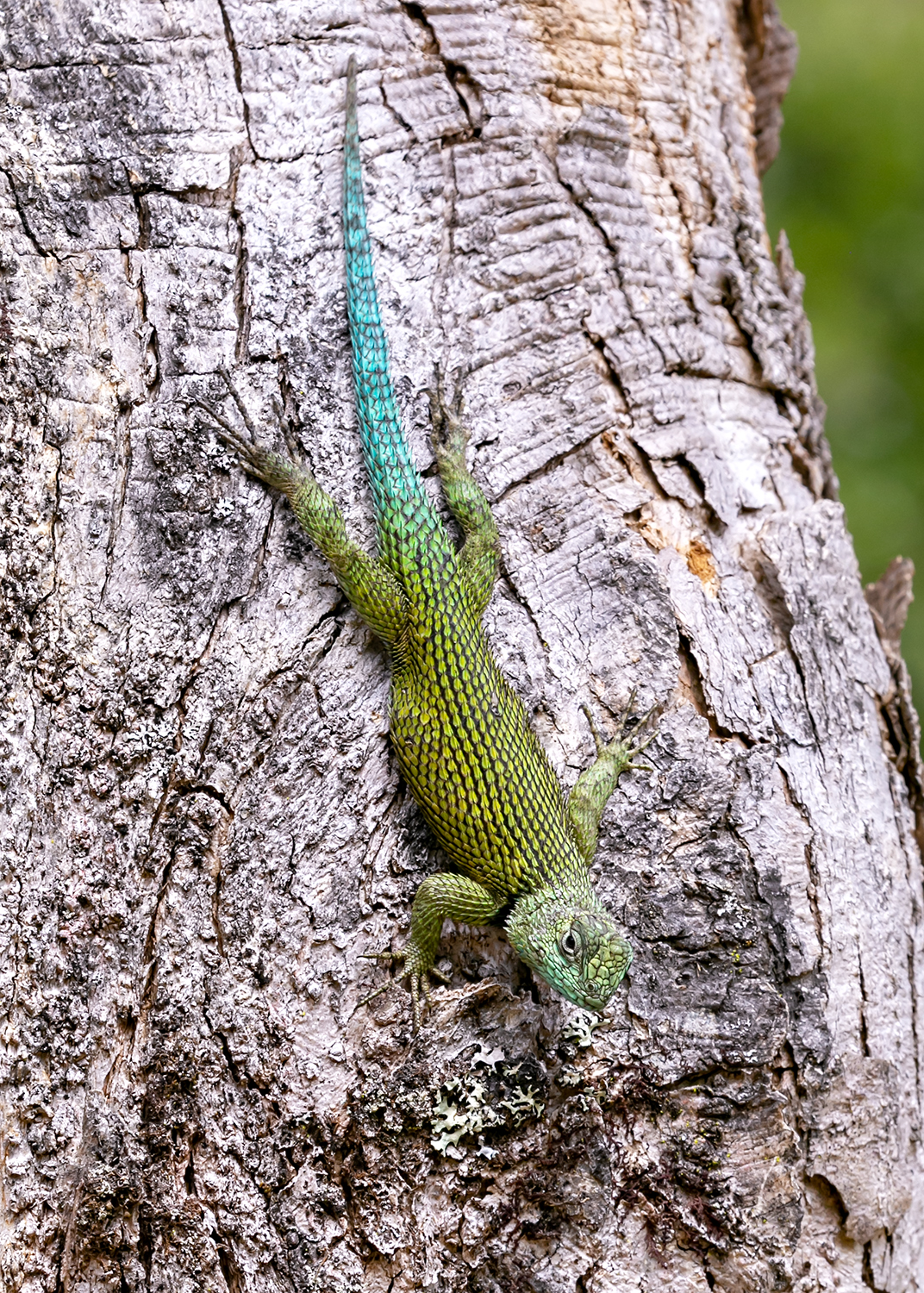
Male

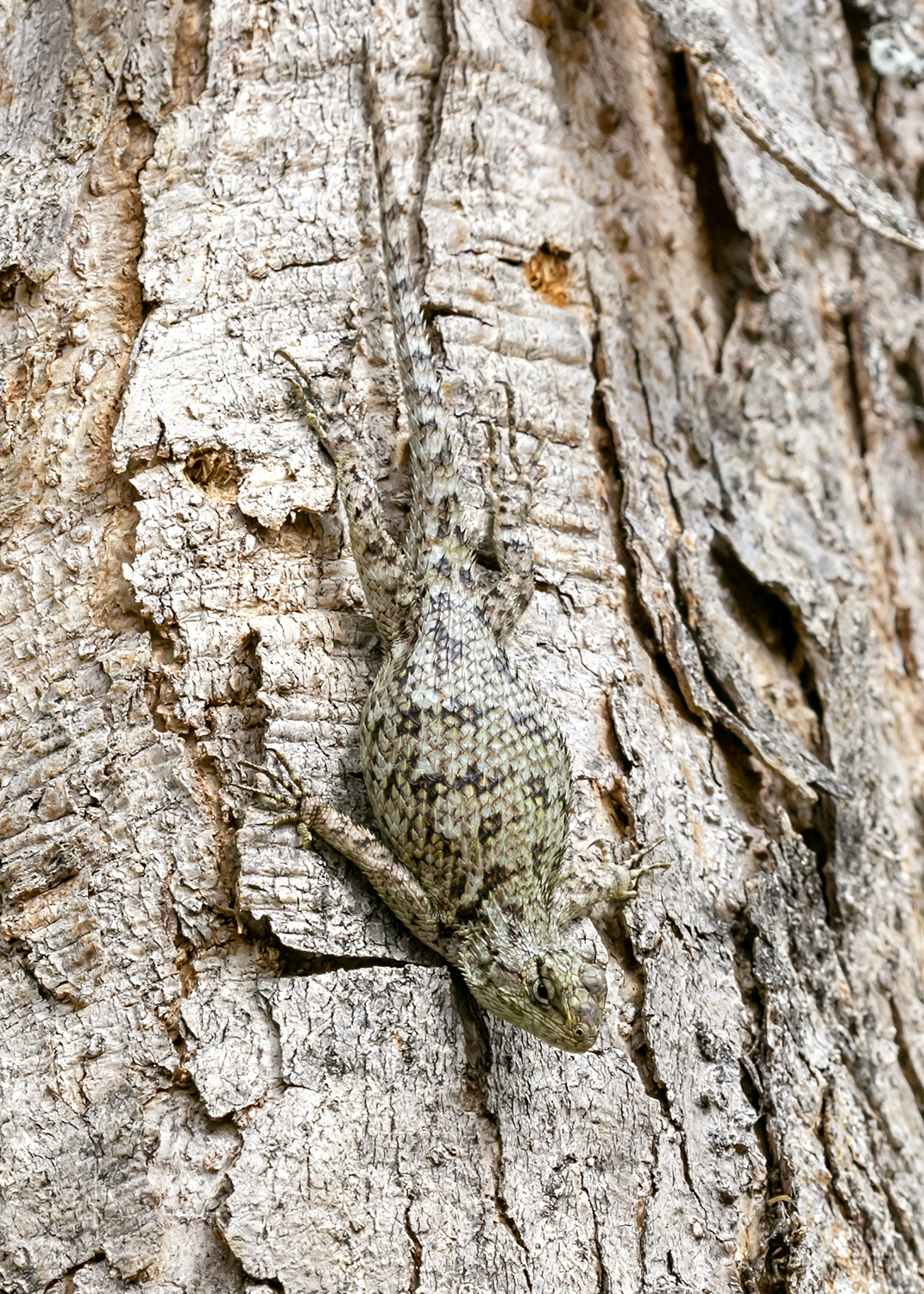
Female

Emerald swifts are distinctly bright green in color, with males typically being more striking than females, having bright blue patches on either side of the belly. They grow from 6–8 inches (15–20 cm) in length. Like other species in the genus Sceloporus, their scales tend to be fairly stiff and heavily keeled, giving them a spiny texture.

== Behavior ==
Emerald swifts are diurnal, arboreal lizards. In the early morning, they forage for insects, and then spend much of the day basking in the sun. They will retreat to a burrow, or under a rock or log if the temperature becomes too high or to sleep. Their life spans are believed to be between three and five years. Unlike most iguanid lizards, emerald swifts are ovoviviparous, giving birth to six to fifteen young yearly.

== Geographic distribution ==
The emerald swift is found from Mexico's Yucatan region, to Belize, Guatemala, Honduras, El Salvador, Nicaragua, Costa Rica, and Panama.

== Taxonomy ==
The species was, for a time, considered to be a subspecies of the Mexican emerald spiny lizard, Sceloporus formosus, but more modern research has returned it to full species status, though some sources still refer to it as a subspecies.

== In captivity ==
Emerald swifts are frequently found in the exotic pet trade. Their striking coloration and ease of care make them popular captives. They feed readily on commercially available crickets and can be maintained in a relatively small vivarium, though they do require adequate UV lighting.
