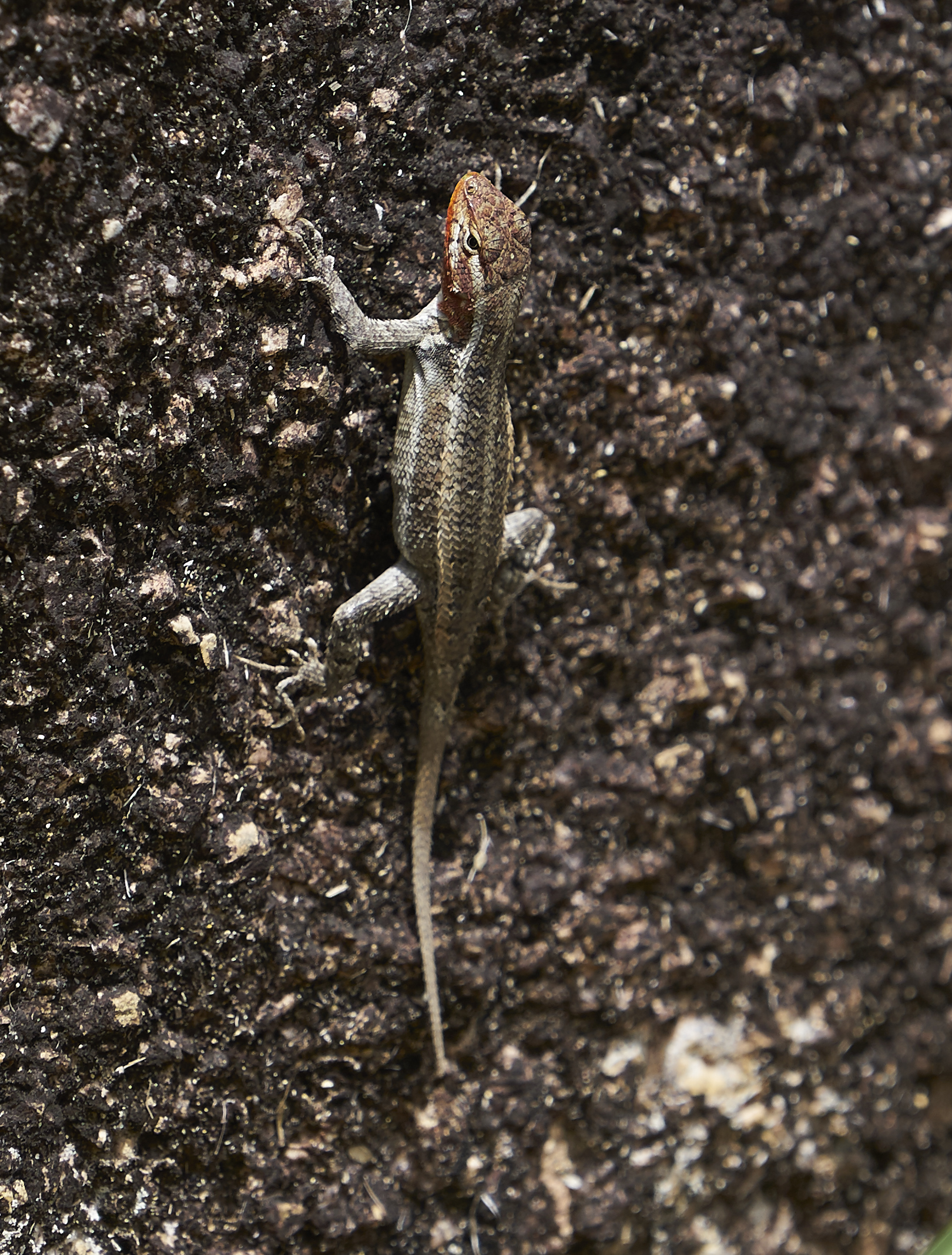

Conservation status
- Least Concern (IUCN 3.1)

Scientific classification
- Domain: Eukaryota
- Kingdom: Animalia
- Phylum: Chordata
- Class: Reptilia
- Order: Squamata
- Suborder: Iguania
- Family: Phrynosomatidae
- Genus: Sceloporus
- Species: S. chrysostictus

Binomial name
- Sceloporus chrysostictus Cope, 1866

Synonyms
- Sceloporus variabilis Barbour & Cole, 1906 (part. fide H.M. Smith, 1939)

= Sceloporus chrysostictus =

Species of lizard

Sceloporus chrysostictus, the yellow-spotted spiny lizard or Yucatán spiny lizard, is a species of phrynosomatid lizard.

== Geographic range ==
It is most commonly found in the Yucatán Peninsula. It also ranges through Guatemala and Northern Belize.
