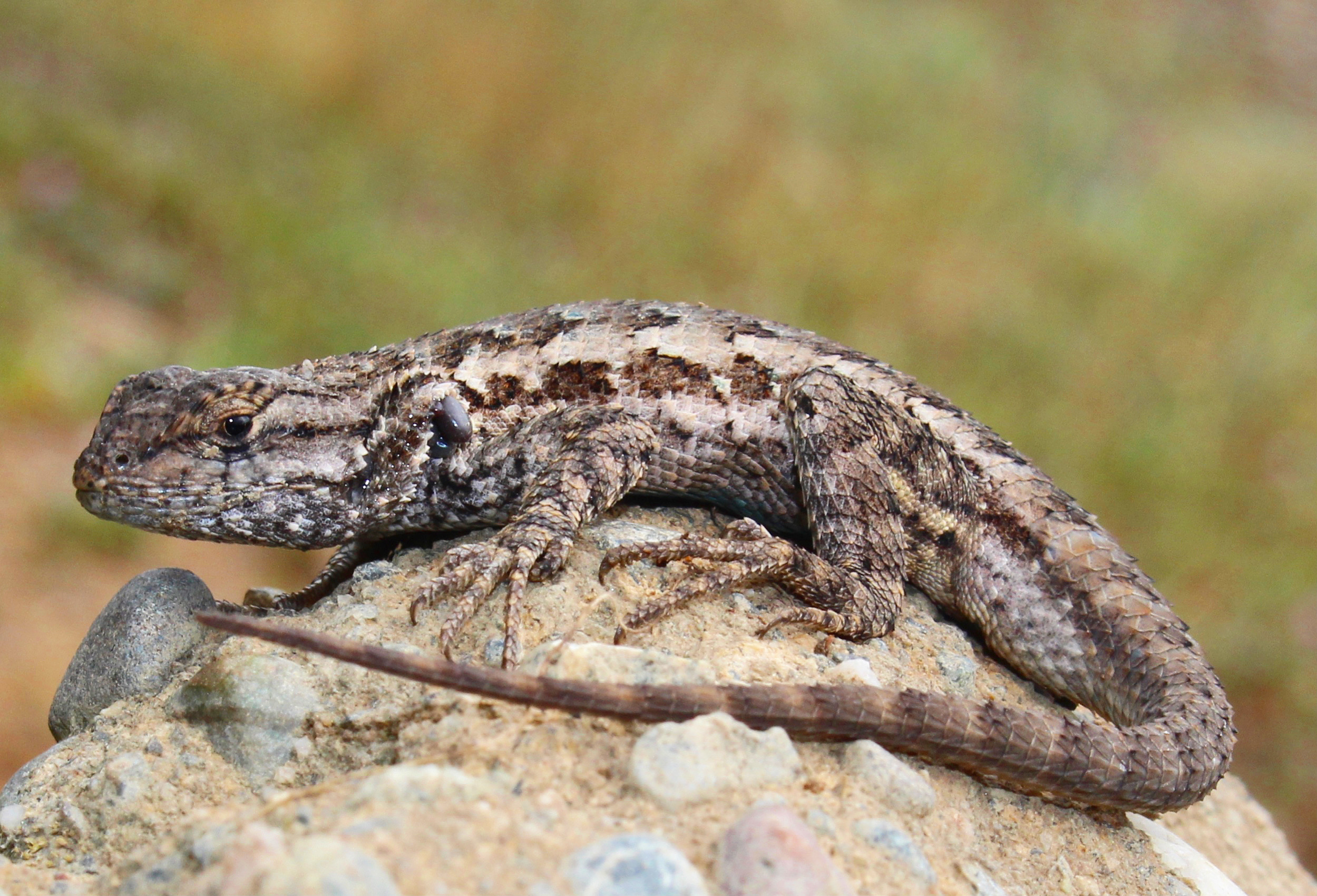
- A western fence lizard in Sacramento County, California

Conservation status
- Least Concern (IUCN 3.1)

Scientific classification
- Kingdom: Animalia
- Phylum: Chordata
- Class: Reptilia
- Order: Squamata
- Suborder: Iguania
- Family: Phrynosomatidae
- Genus: Sceloporus
- Species: S. occidentalis

Binomial name
- Sceloporus occidentalis Baird and Girard, 1852

= Western fence lizard =

Western fence lizards

Species of lizard

The western fence lizard (Sceloporus occidentalis) is a species of lizard native to Arizona, New Mexico, and California, as well as Wyoming, Idaho, Nevada, Oregon, Utah, Washington, and Northern Mexico. The species is widely found in its native range and is considered common, often being seen in yards, or as the name implies, on fences. As the ventral abdomen of an adult is characteristically blue, it is also known as the blue-belly. Two western fence lizards have been reported with duplicated or forked tails, presumably following an autotomy.

== Taxonomy ==
Taxonomy for the western fence lizard has been under much debate. S. occidentalis belongs in the order Squamata (snakes and lizards) and the suborder Iguania. The family in which it belongs is still under scrutiny. The family Phrynosomatidae, along with seven other families, used to be included in the single family Iguanidae, until Frost and Etheridge's (1989) analysis of iguanian systematics suggested the family be divided. Most literature, however, still place the phrynosomatids in Iguanidae.

Five subspecies are recognized, as follows:

- San Joaquin fence lizard, Sceloporus occidentalis biseriatus
- Coast Range fence lizard, Sceloporus occidentalis bocourtii
- Great Basin fence lizard, Sceloporus occidentalis longipes
- Northwestern fence lizard, Sceloporus occidentalis occidentalis
- Sierra fence lizard, Sceloporus occidentalis taylori

Some authors have raised the island fence lizard to specific rank, Sceloporus becki. However, recent work in molecular systematics has suggested there are four clades and 11 genetically separable populations, and the subspecies will probably have to be redefined.

== Identification ==
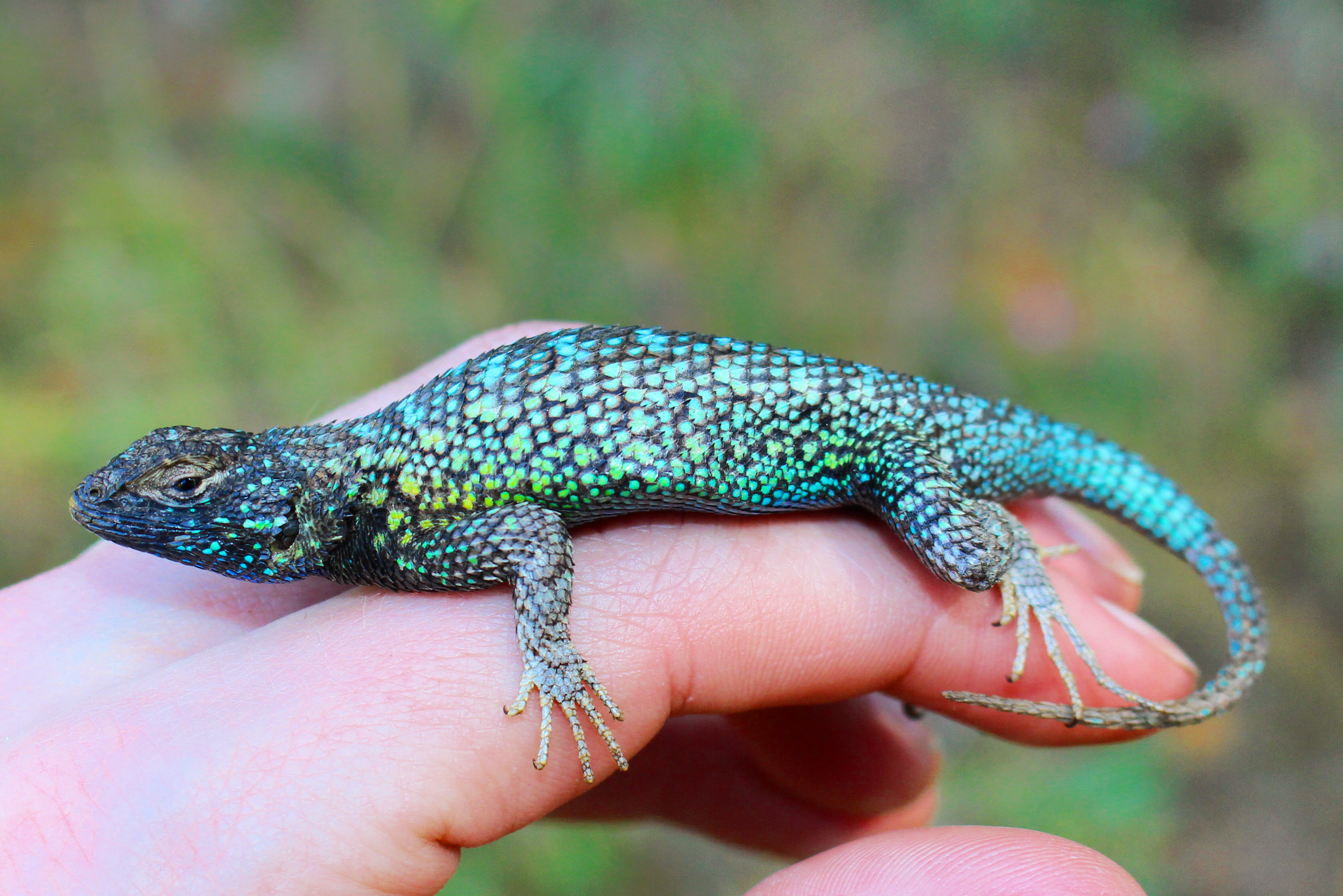
Male S. o. occidentalis displaying iridescent, bright turquoise and blue coloration. This individual displays a more striking coloration than is usually seen in this species.

Western fence lizards measure 5.7–8.9 centimetres or 2.2–3.5 inches (snout-vent length) and a total length of about 21 centimetres (8.3 in). They are brown to black in color (the brown may be sandy or greenish) and have black stripes on their backs, but their most distinguishing characteristic is their bright blue bellies. The ventral sides of the limbs are yellow. Male blue belly lizards also have blue patches on their throats. This bright coloration is faint or absent in both females and juveniles. In some populations the males also display iridescent, bright turquoise blue spots on the dorsal surface. The scales of S. occidentalis are sharply keeled, and between the interparietal and rear of thighs, there are 35–57 scales.

Many other lizards have similar bright-blue coloring. The eastern fence lizard, S. undulatus, instead of having one large patch on its throat, has two small patches. The sagebrush lizard, S. graciosus, lacks yellow limbs and has smaller dorsal scales. S. occidentalis also resembles the side-blotched lizard, Uta stansburiana. However, the axilla of U. stansburiana usually has a black spot behind it and it has a complete gular fold.

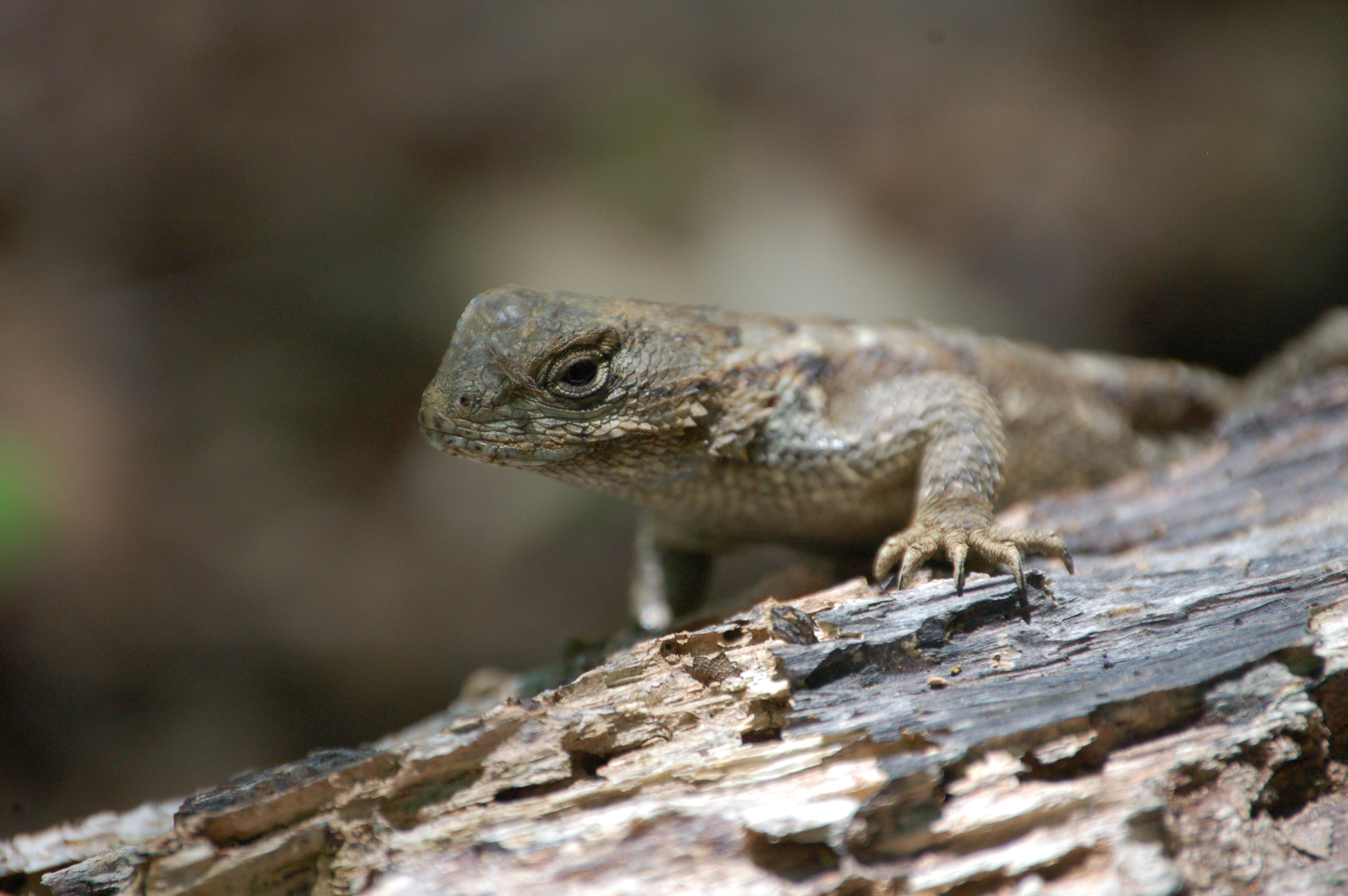
A juvenile western fence lizard.

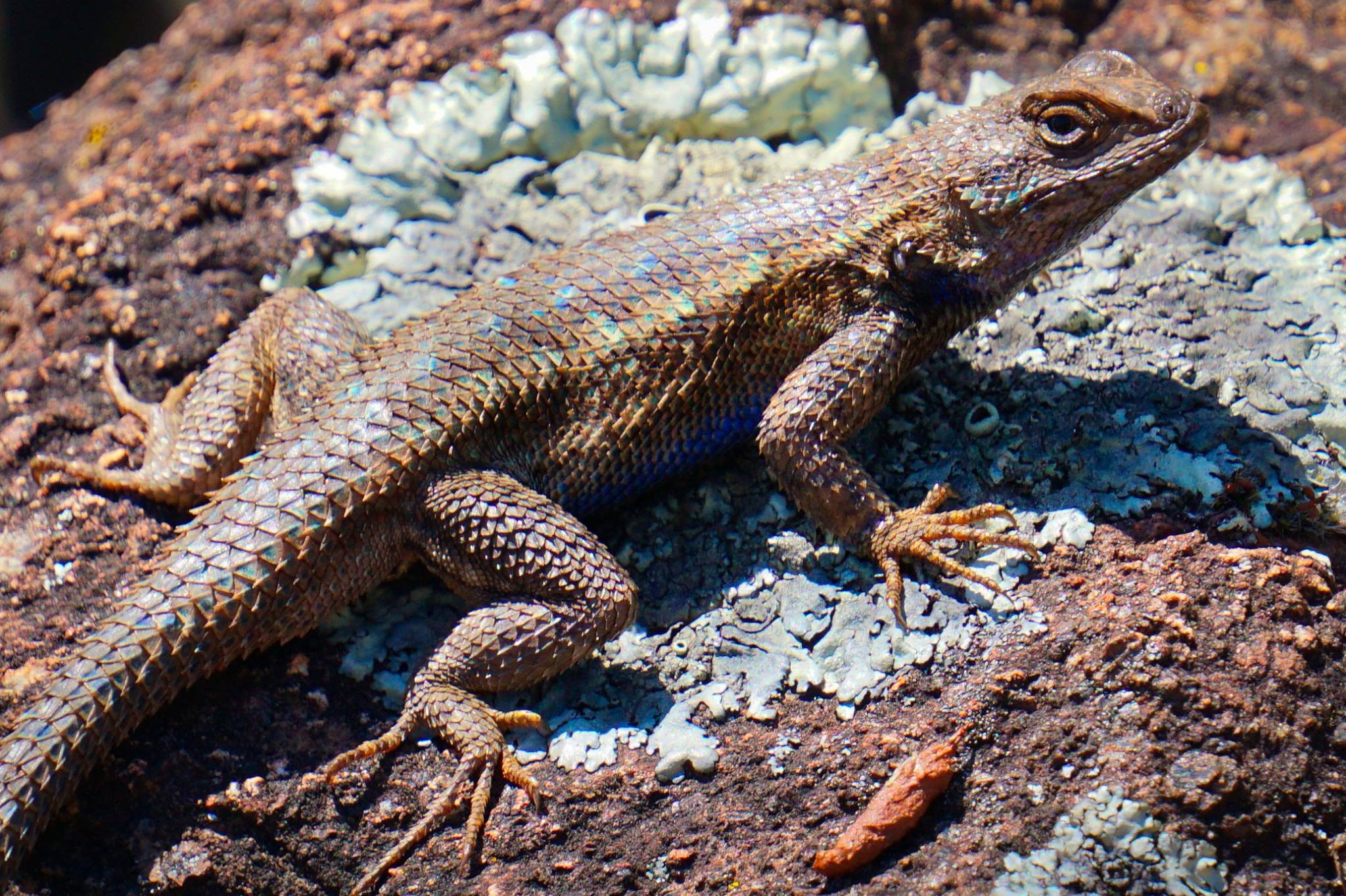
Adult male western fence lizard.

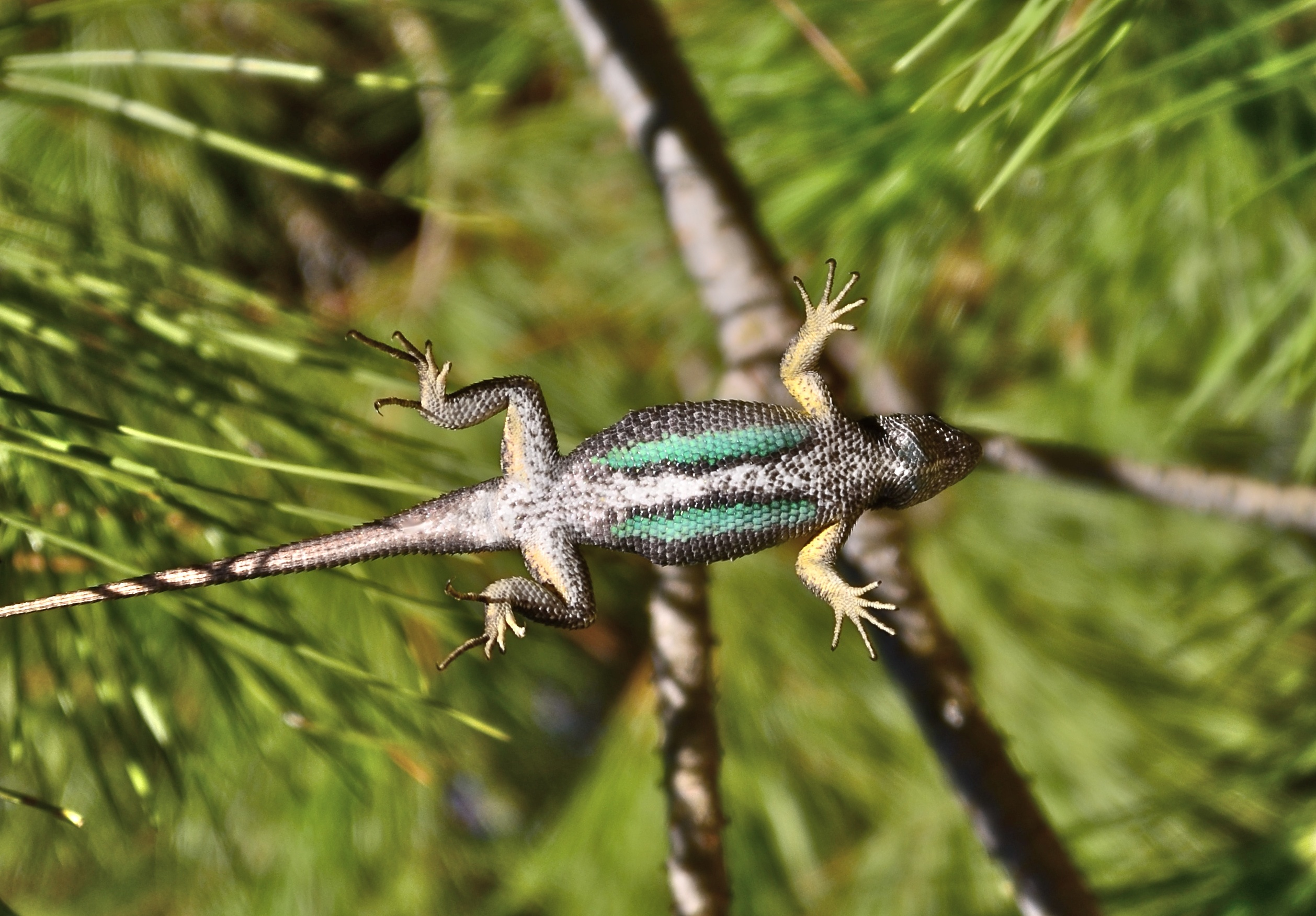
The blue ventral side of the lizard, giving it the name "bright blue belly"

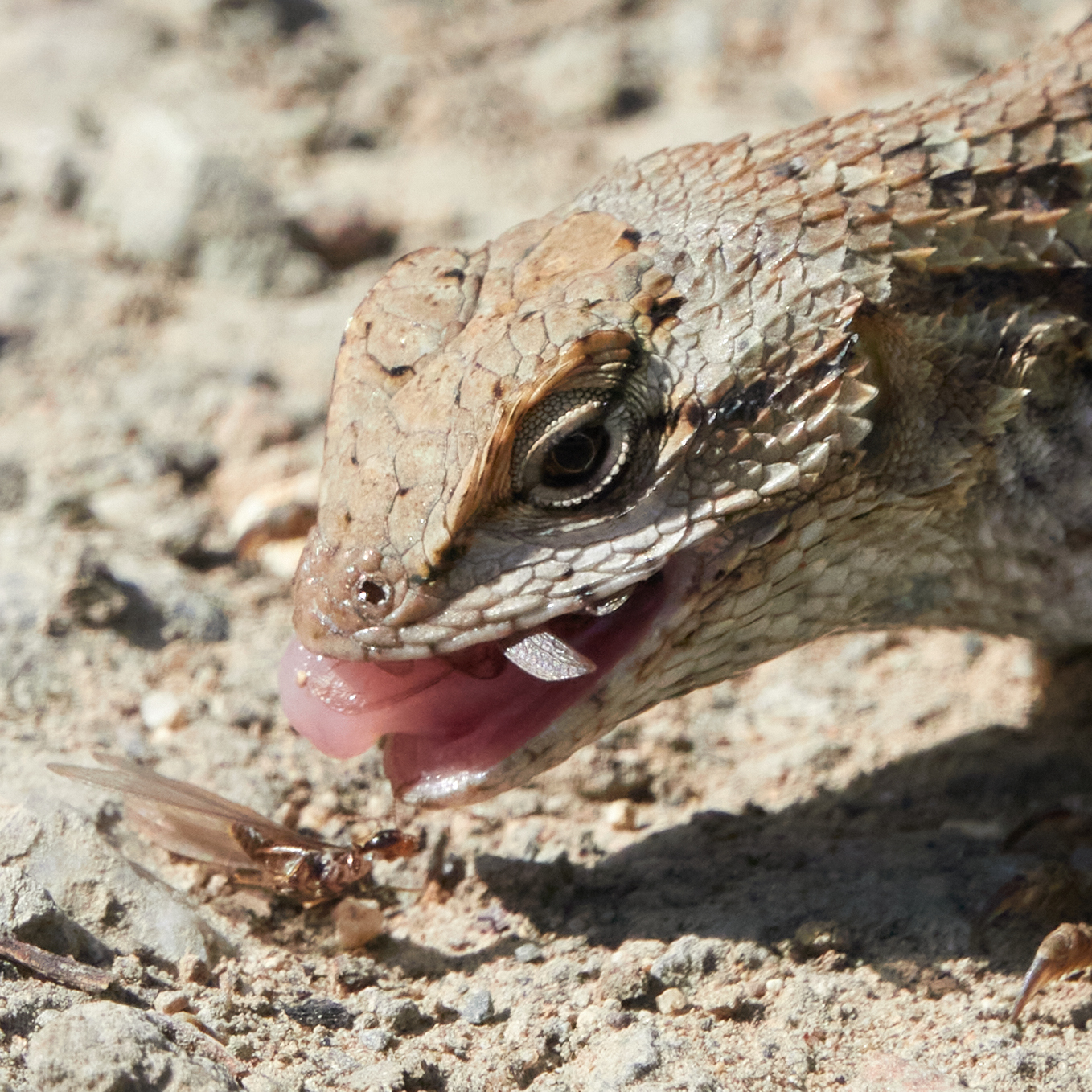
Eating termite alates

== Distribution and habitat ==
Although California is the heart of the range of this lizard, it is also found in eastern and southwestern Oregon (some populations are found even north of Seattle, Washington), as well as in the Columbia River Gorge, southwestern Idaho, Nevada, western Utah, northwestern Baja California, New Mexico, Arizona, and some of the islands off the coast of both California and Baja California. There is also an isolated population in the Northwestern Tualatin Valley, around Henry Hagg Lake.

The western fence lizard occupies a variety of habitats. It is found in grassland, broken chaparral, sagebrush, woodland, coniferous forest, and farmland, and occupies elevations from sea level to 10,800 ft. They generally avoid the harsh desert and are often found near water.

In California, the western fence lizard is found in most territories apart from deserts or densely forested locations. According to predictions by the California Department of Fish and Wildlife, most of California except for the San Joaquin Valley and South Eastern California are suitable habitats for the western fence lizard. In the habitats, the western fence lizard functions as an important food source for many vertebrates including snakes and predatory birds. As of now, the western fence lizard is listed as unprotected, and no conservation restrictions apply.

== Urbanization ==
Habitat loss caused by urbanization has many effects on the western fence lizard. Lizards in an urbanized environment have evolved to have shorter limbs and toes. This is because of the change in surfaces that the lizards use. While before urbanization western fence lizards used mostly woody substances, after urbanization they used more man-made substances, a greater breadth of habitats and developed shorter limbs and toes.

The habitat loss also causes a decrease in the number of scales. This is because of the urban heat island effect, increasing the temperature year round. The increase in temperature causes an increase in scale size and a decrease in scale number as it decreases the number of living cells in-between the scales and lowers evaporative water loss and heat load.

== Behavior ==
These lizards are diurnal, and are commonly seen basking on paths, rocks, and fence posts, and other suitable sunny locations. Some nocturnal activities are noted during warm periods, the length of which varies geographically but mostly falls in spring and summer. They can change color from light grey or tan to nearly jet black for the purpose of thermoregulation while basking. S. occidentalis goes through a period of brumation during the winter. The length of time and when they emerge varies depending on climate. During mating seasons, adult males will defend a home that ranges up to 7.5 meters in radius through posturing and combat, displaying for both females and rival males with their distinctive "push-ups". On occasion, they can be seen fighting.

The western fence lizard feeds almost exclusively on terrestrial invertebrates. The main source of food is insects, and the western fence lizard is less frequently observed to feed on spiders, isopods, centipedes, ticks, scorpions, and sometimes even other western fence lizards. The sagebrush lizard has a similar geological distribution compared with the western fence lizard, and some competition for food may occur between the two species. However, the two species can co-occur without reducing each other’s population size since they have different food sources and avoid each other on a local scale.

== Reproduction ==
Western fence lizards mate in the spring, and do not breed until the spring of their second year. Courtship for captive western fence lizards happens in March and April. In May and June, the lizards copulate. Egg laying and copulation are separated by about two weeks to one month. Females lay eggs under a flat surface by digging a nest at night. She lays one to three clutches of three to 17 eggs (usually eight) between April and July. The eggs hatch after an incubation period of about 60 days.

== Lyme disease ==
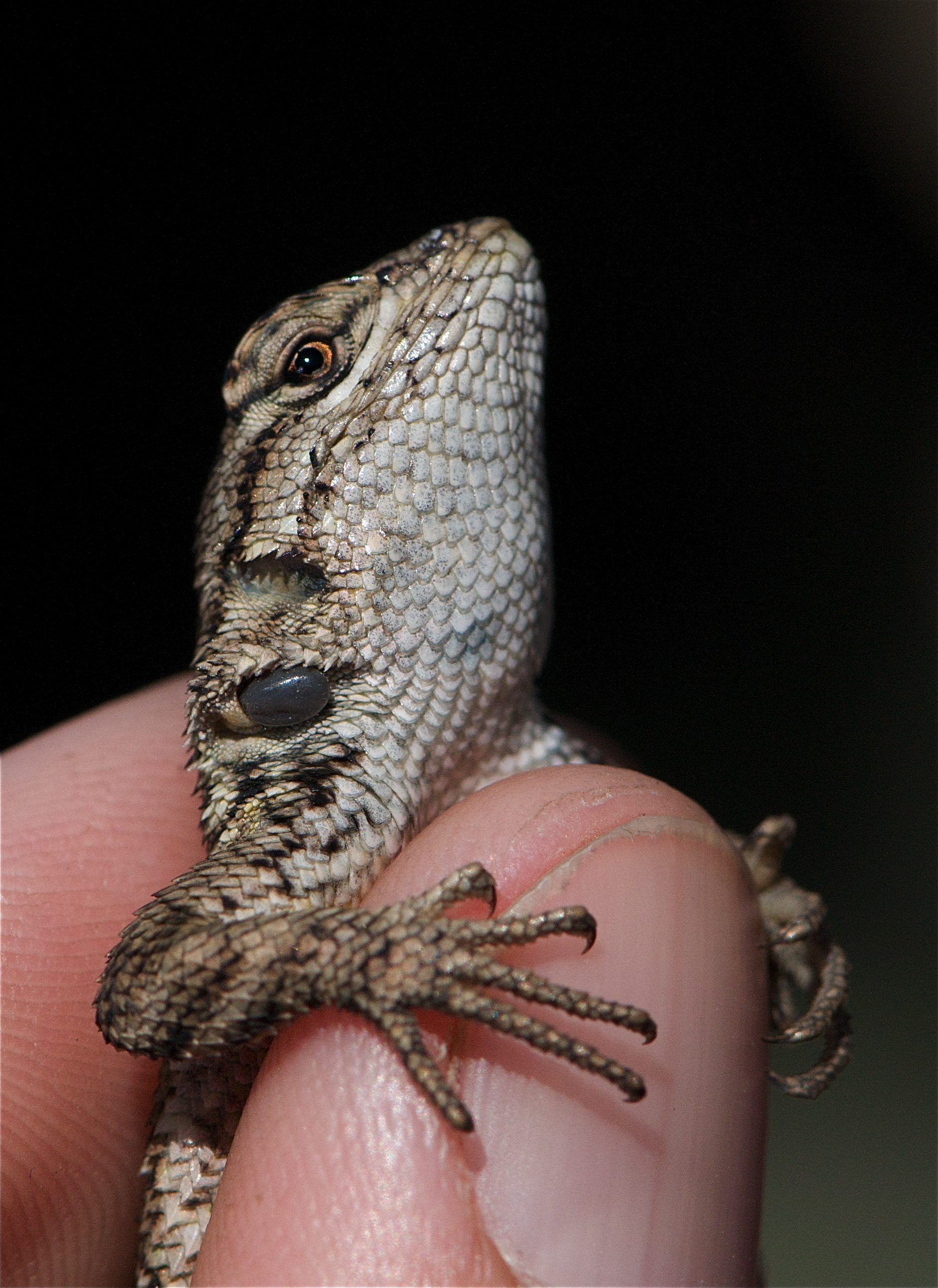
Western fence lizard with ticks

Studies have shown that cases of Lyme disease are rarer in areas where the lizards are found. When ticks carrying Lyme disease feed on these lizards' blood (which they commonly do, especially around their ears), a protein in the lizard's blood kills the bacterium in the tick that causes Lyme disease. The infection inside the ticks' gut is therefore cleared and the tick no longer carries Lyme disease.
