= Sceloporus cupreus =

Scientific classification
- Kingdom: Animalia
- Phylum: Chordata
- Class: Reptilia
- Order: Squamata
- Suborder: Iguania
- Family: Phrynosomatidae
- Genus: Sceloporus
- Species: S. cupreus

Binomial name
- Sceloporus cupreus Bocourt, 1873

Synonyms
- Sceloporus cupreus Bocourt, 1873; Sceloporus cochranae H.M. Smith, 1936; Sceloporus siniferus cupreus — H.M. Smith & Taylor, 1950; Sceloporus cupreus — Wiens & Reeder, 1997

Species of lizard

Sceloporus cupreus, also known commonly as the upland long-tailed spiny lizard, is a species of lizard in the family Phrynosomatidae. The species is endemic to Mexico.

== Etymology ==
The specific name, cupreus, meaning "coppery" in Latin, refers to the dorsal color of some males of this species. The junior synonym, S. cochranae, was named in honor of American herpetologist Doris Mable Cochran.

== Geographic range ==
S. cupreus is found in the Mexican state of Oaxaca.
