= Sceloporus internasalis =

Conservation status
- Least Concern (IUCN 3.1)

Scientific classification
- Kingdom: Animalia
- Phylum: Chordata
- Class: Reptilia
- Order: Squamata
- Suborder: Iguania
- Family: Phrynosomatidae
- Genus: Sceloporus
- Species: S. internasalis

Binomial name
- Sceloporus internasalis H.M. Smith & Bumzahem, 1955

Species of lizard

Sceloporus internasalis, the mail-snouted spiny lizard, is a species of lizard in the family Phrynosomatidae. It is found in Mexico and Guatemala.
