= Petrosaurus repens =

Conservation status
- Least Concern (IUCN 3.1)

Scientific classification
- Kingdom: Animalia
- Phylum: Chordata
- Class: Reptilia
- Order: Squamata
- Suborder: Iguania
- Family: Phrynosomatidae
- Genus: Petrosaurus
- Species: P. repens

Binomial name
- Petrosaurus repens (Van Denburgh, 1895)
- Petrosaurus repens current range (green)

Species of lizard

Petrosaurus repens is a species of lizard in the family Phrynosomatidae. It is from the central Baja California Peninsula in northwestern Mexico.
