= Petrosaurus slevini =

Conservation status
- Least Concern (IUCN 3.1)

Scientific classification
- Kingdom: Animalia
- Phylum: Chordata
- Class: Reptilia
- Order: Squamata
- Suborder: Iguania
- Family: Phrynosomatidae
- Genus: Petrosaurus
- Species: P. slevini

Binomial name
- Petrosaurus slevini (Van Denburgh, 1922)

Species of lizard

Petrosaurus slevini, the banded rock lizard, is a species of lizard in the family Phrynosomatidae. It is endemic to the island of Angel de la Guarda and the adjacent islet of Mejía, in the Gulf of California off the east coast of the Baja California Peninsula in northwestern Mexico.
