= Desertiguana =

Desertiguana Temporal range: Late Cretaceous

Scientific classification
- Domain: Eukaryota
- Kingdom: Animalia
- Phylum: Chordata
- Class: Reptilia
- Order: Squamata
- Suborder: Iguania
- Family: Phrynosomatidae
- Genus: †Desertiguana; Alifanov, 2013

Type species
- †Desertiguana gobiensis Alifanov, 2013

Extinct genus of lizards

Desertiguana is an extinct genus of lizard in the family Phrynosomatidae. It is a monotypic genus represented by the type species Desertiguana gobiensis from the Late Cretaceous Barun Goyot Formation of Mongolia. Desertiguana gobiensis is known from a single left lower jaw.
