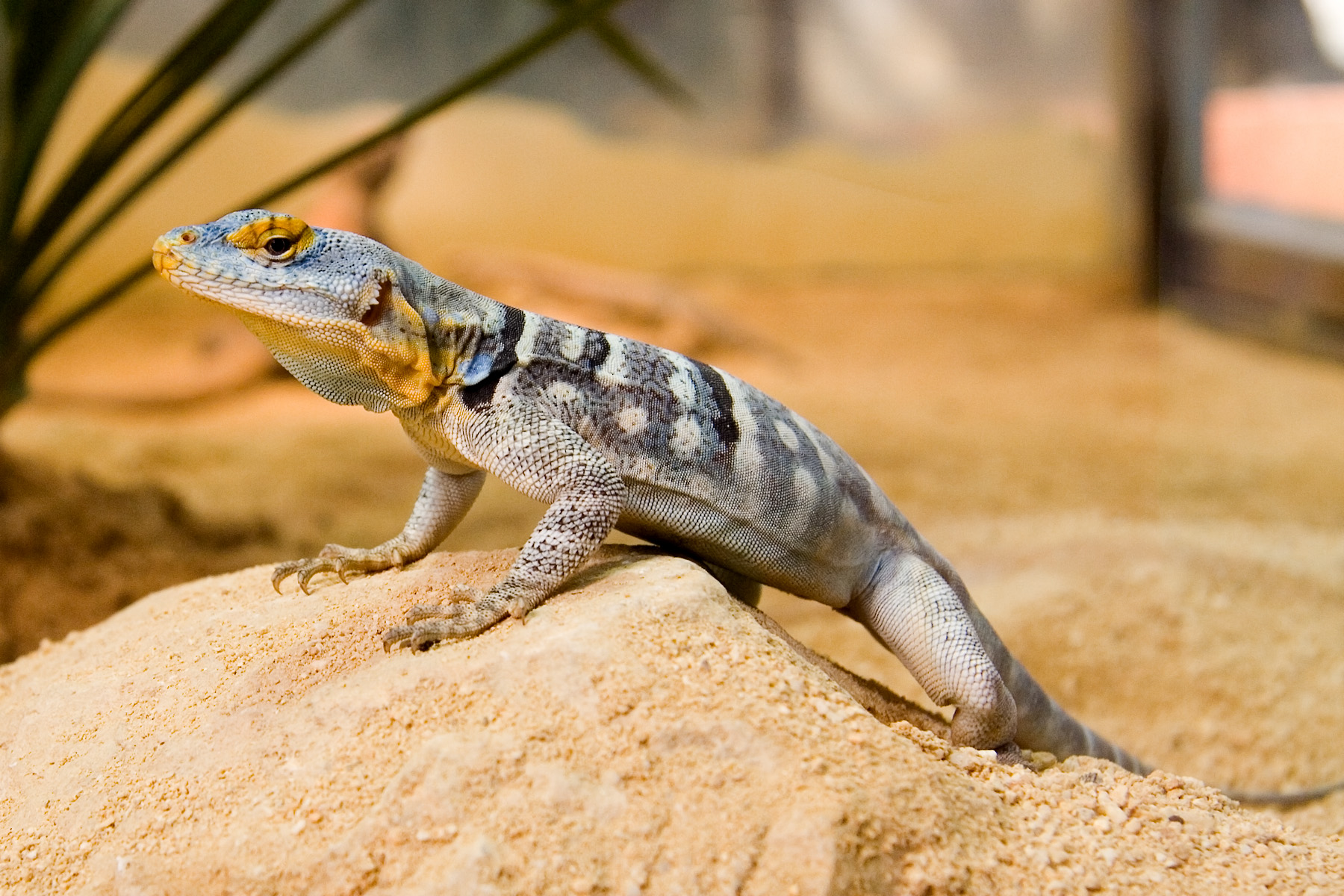
- Baja blue rock lizard

Scientific classification
- Kingdom: Animalia
- Phylum: Chordata
- Class: Reptilia
- Order: Squamata
- Suborder: Iguania
- Family: Phrynosomatidae
- Genus: Petrosaurus; Boulenger, 1885

Species
- See text

= California rock lizard =

California rock lizards - Petrosaurus

Genus of lizards

The California rock lizards are a genus (Petrosaurus) of New World lizards in the family Phrynosomatidae.

== Geographic range ==
They are endemic to southern California, United States, and Baja California and Baja California Sur, Mexico.

== Habitat ==
This lizard species lives almost exclusively on rock outcrops, boulder piles, and canyon walls, where it shelters under rocks. Their habitat consists of arid and semiarid foothills and canyons along the western margin of the Colorado Desert.

== Reproduction ==
The courtship begins shortly after emergence in early spring. The eggs are laid around June and July.

== Predators ==
The few predators that could pursue this lizard are collared lizards and avian predators, such as hawks, ravens, and roadrunners.

== Species ==
The genus Petrosaurus contains four species.

Image	Scientific name	Common name	Distribution
	Petrosaurus mearnsi (Stejneger, 1894)	banded rock lizard	southern California, United States, and Baja California, Mexico
	Petrosaurus repens (Van Denburgh, 1895)		Baja California and Baja California Sur, Mexico
	Petrosaurus slevini (Van Denburgh, 1922)	banded rock lizard	Baja California, Mexico
	Petrosaurus thalassinus (Cope, 1863)	Baja blue rock lizard	Baja California Sur, Mexico
