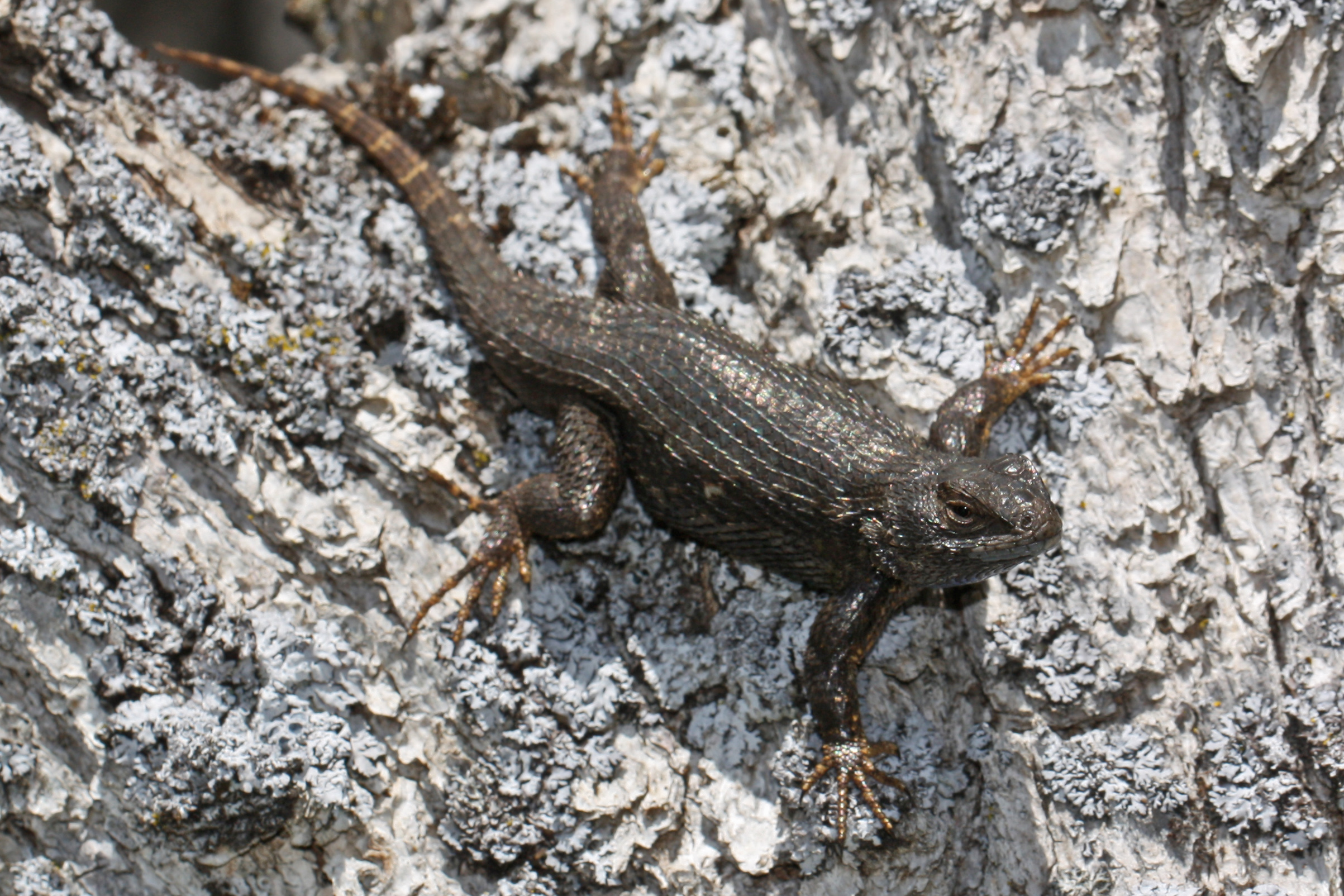

Scientific classification
- Kingdom: Animalia
- Phylum: Chordata
- Order: Squamata
- Suborder: Iguania
- Family: Phrynosomatidae
- Genus: Sceloporus
- Species: S. occidentalis
- Subspecies: S. o. occidentalis

Trinomial name
- Sceloporus occidentalis occidentalis Baird and Girard, 1852

= Sceloporus occidentalis occidentalis =

Northwestern fence lizard

Subspecies of lizard

Sceloporus occidentalis occidentalis is a subspecies of the western fence lizard. The common name for this taxon is the northwestern fence lizard. This lizard occurs in the state of Washington in the United States.

== See also ==
- Coast Range fence lizard
- Island fence lizard
