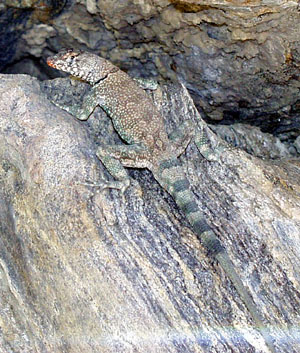

Conservation status
- Least Concern (IUCN 3.1)

Scientific classification
- Kingdom: Animalia
- Phylum: Chordata
- Class: Reptilia
- Order: Squamata
- Suborder: Iguania
- Family: Phrynosomatidae
- Genus: Petrosaurus
- Species: P. mearnsi

Binomial name
- Petrosaurus mearnsi (Stejneger, 1894)

Synonyms
- Uta mearnsi Stejneger, 1894; Streptosaurus mearnsi — Mittleman, 1942; Petrosaurus mearnsi — Stebbins, 1985

= Petrosaurus mearnsi =

Species of lizard

Petrosaurus mearnsi, also called commonly the banded rock lizard and Mearns' rock lizard, is a species of lizard in the family Phrynosomatidae. The species is native to western North America.

== Etymology ==
The specific name, mearnsi, is in honor of American naturalist Edgar Alexander Mearns, who collected the first specimens.

== Geographic range ==
Petrosaurus mearnsi is endemic to extreme southern California and Baja California, Mexico. It also occurs on Isla El Muerto.

== Description ==
Petrosaurus mearnsi is an extremely flat-bodied lizard. Its dorsum is olive, brown or gray, with white or bluish spots. It has a single black collar, a banded tail, and granular scales on its body, with keeled tail and limb scales. Individuals may have a snout-to-vent length (SVL) of 6.2–8.7 cm (2.4–3.4 in). Males have more pronounced throat patterns and brighter blue coloring than females.

== Habitat ==
Petrosaurus mearnsi is associated with boulder hillsides, extending in Baja California to chaparral and pinyon-juniper woodlands.

== Diet ==
Petrosaurus mearnsi is omnivorous, feeding not only on insects and spiders, but also on buds and flowers.

== Reproduction ==
Gravid females of Petrosaurus mearnsi lay eggs from June through August. Clutch size varies from 2 to 6 eggs.

== Sources ==
- This article is based on a description from "A Field Guide to the Reptiles and Amphibians of Coastal Southern California", Robert N. Fisher and Ted J. Case, USGS, https://www.werc.usgs.gov/fieldguide/index.htm.
