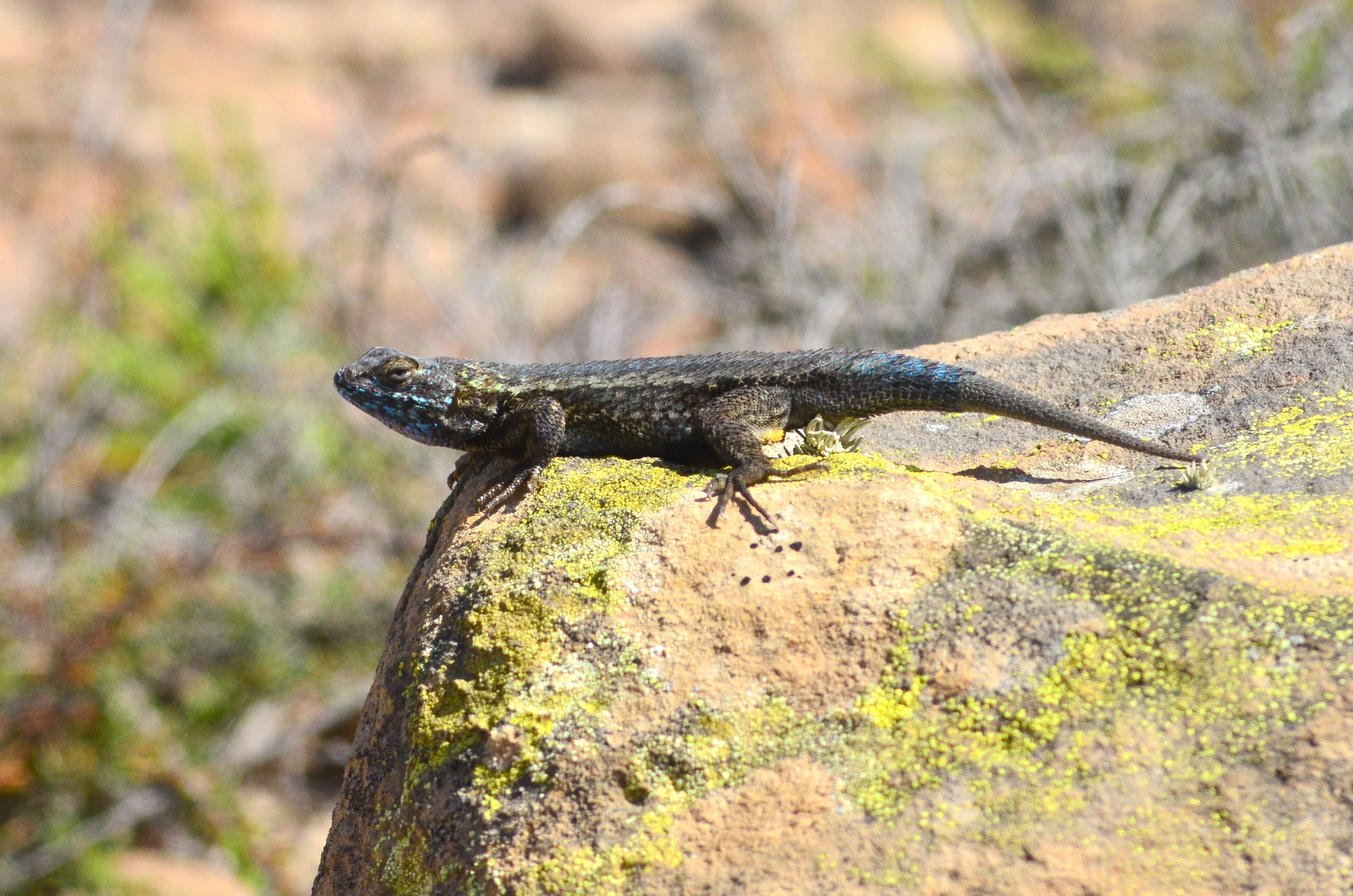

Scientific classification
- Kingdom: Animalia
- Phylum: Chordata
- Class: Reptilia
- Order: Squamata
- Suborder: Iguania
- Family: Phrynosomatidae
- Genus: Sceloporus
- Species: S. becki

Binomial name
- Sceloporus becki Van Denburgh, 1905

Synonyms
- Sceloporus occidentalis becki Crowther, 2000

= Sceloporus becki =

Species of lizard

Sceloporus becki, also known as the island fence lizard, is a species of lizard endemic to the Channel Islands of California.

== Taxonomy ==
It was once considered a subspecies of the western fence lizard (Sceloporus occidentalis), but is now considered to be its own species. Many authorities have accepted research concluding that the island fence lizard (Sceloporus occidentalis becki) is its own unique species. However, there is some discrepancy between the current classification of the species and emerging findings, thus the taxonomy of the entire Sceloporus occidentalis species could be revised in the future.

== Description ==
Despite it being a distinct subspecies, it shares a physically similar appearance as various mainland sub-species of the western fence lizard, a very common lizard in California.

The island fence lizard is a relatively small species characterized by keeled and pointed dorsal scales of uniform size across the back, sides, and belly. The scales on the thighs are mostly keeled and noticeably smaller, while the rear of the limbs is colored yellow or orange. A distinctive blue coloration is present on the sides of the belly. The lizard's overall coloration varies between brown, gray, or black with blotches, and it may have light markings forming stripes or irregular lines along the sides of the back. In some cases, dark blotching creates irregular bands. The belly is pale in color. Males are distinguished by blue markings on the sides of the belly, bordered in black, a black patch on the throat, enlarged postanal scales, and a swollen tail base. When exposed to light, some of the dorsal scales may exhibit a blue or greenish tint. In contrast, females show faint or absent blue belly markings, no blue or green coloration on their upper surfaces, and display dark bars or crescents on their backs. Juveniles typically lack blue throat markings and may have faint or no blue coloration on the belly. Due to the distinct vivid blue coloration on the abdomen of adult males of the species, this species is sometimes referred to as the "blue belly lizard".

== Behavior ==
These lizards are most active when temperatures are warm, and are often inactive during extreme thermal conditions. However, the moderate and consistent temperatures of the channel islands usually allow for year long activity. They are often seen in sunny areas, such as stream banks, beach driftwood, grassy hillsides, and human settlements. They are frequently seen basking on rocks, logs, fences, and walls.

Males typically establish territory on elevated perches in order to observe potential mates or rivals. Males defend their territory through physical combat, and try to attract females through displays of head-bobbing and pushups to show off blue throat and ventral colors.

Island fence lizards portray common behaviors of tail detachment and regeneration, being able to easily detach their tail to flee from predators. The detach tail squirms to distract a predator, allowing time for the lizard's body to escape.

== Reproduction ==
Adult island fence lizards mate in spring of their second year. Females lay between one and three clutches of eggs, with each clutch containing three to seventeen eggs, from April through July. The eggs take roughly 60 days to hatch, occurring between July and September. Eggs have a white leathery shell and typically measure 8 by 14 mm. Females lay there eggs in small pits of loose damp soil (usually during the night).

== Etymology ==
The specific epithet, becki, is in honor of Rollo Howard Beck, an American ornithologist who collected the first specimens.
