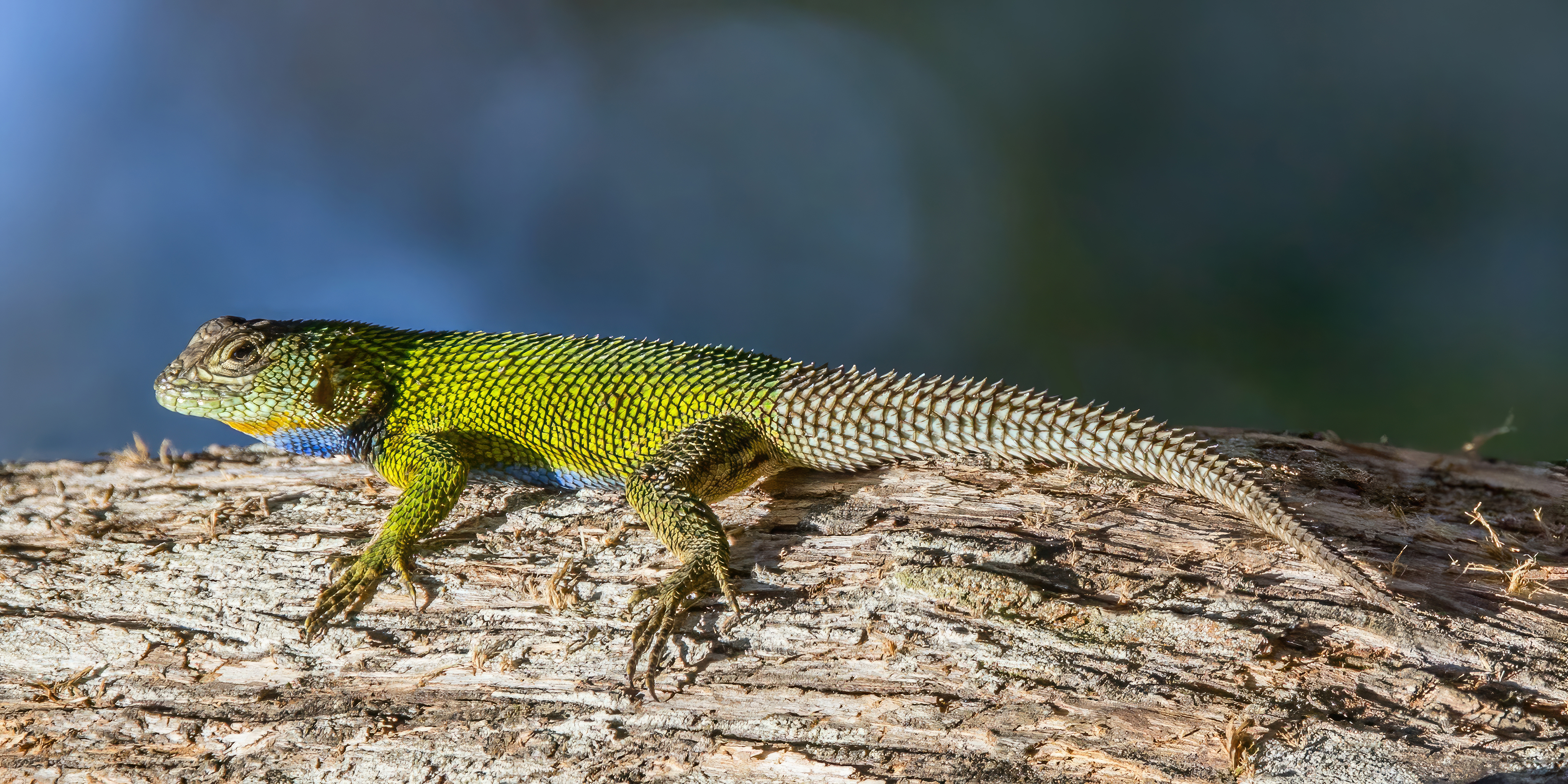
- Emerald swift (Sceloporus malachiticus)

Scientific classification
- Kingdom: Animalia
- Phylum: Chordata
- Class: Reptilia
- Order: Squamata
- Suborder: Iguania
- Infraorder: Pleurodonta
- Family: Phrynosomatidae; Fitzinger, 1843

Genera
- Callisaurus; Cophosaurus †Desertiguana; Holbrookia; Petrosaurus; Phrynosoma; Sceloporus; Uma; Urosaurus; Uta

= Phrynosomatidae =

Phrynosomatidae Temporal range: Late Cretaceous to recent, 85–0 Ma

Family of lizards

The Phrynosomatidae are a diverse family of lizards found from Panama to the extreme south of Canada. Many members of the group are adapted to life in hot, sandy deserts, although the spiny lizards prefer rocky deserts or even relatively moist forest edges, and the short-horned lizard lives in prairie or sagebrush environments. The group includes both oviparous (egg-laying) and viviparous species, with the latter being more common in species living at high elevations. Oviparous and viviparous species of Phrynosomatidae lizards co-localize in certain areas of the United States, including New Mexico. The earliest fossil remains of this group are known from the Late Cretaceous of Mongolia and belong to the genus Desertiguana. As phrynosomatids are only known from North America, these remains indicate that phrynosomatids likely had a wider distribution in prehistoric times.

== Genera ==
The Phrynosomatidae are organised into nine genera.

The earless taxa (Cophosaurus and Holbrookia) are sister genera.

Family Phrynosomatidae

- Callisaurus Blainville, 1835 – zebra-tailed lizards
- Cophosaurus Troschel, 1852 – greater earless lizards
- Holbrookia Girard, 1851 – earless lizards
- Petrosaurus Boulenger, 1885 – California rock lizards
- Phrynosoma Wiegmann, 1828 – horned lizards
- Sceloporus Wiegmann, 1828 – spiny lizards (or sator)
- Uma Baird, 1859 – fringe-toed lizards
- Urosaurus Hallowell, 1854 – tree and brush lizards
- Uta Baird & Girard, 1852 – side-blotched lizards
