= List of reptiles of Texas =

This list of reptiles of Texas includes the snakes, lizards, crocodilians, and turtles native to the U.S. state of Texas.

Texas has a large range of habitats, from swamps, coastal marshes and pine forests in the east, rocky hills and limestone karst in the center, desert in the south and west, mountains in the far west, and grassland prairie in the north. This vast contrast in biomes makes Texas home to an extremely wide variety of herpetofauna. Its central position in the United States means that species found primarily in either the western or eastern parts of the country often have their ranges meeting in the state. Its proximity to Mexico is such that many species found there and into Central America range as far north as Texas. The abundance of reptiles makes the state a prime area for research, and most species found in Texas have been well studied.

Texas state law protects several reptile species; threatened species are denoted with a (T) and endangered species are denoted with an (E). The climate of Texas has also led to some species being introduced and establishing a permanent population, denoted with an (I).

Conservation status
Least-concern species
Vulnerable species
Endangered species
Critically endangered
Invasive species

== Crocodilians ==
Order: Crocodilia
Picture	Scientific name	Common name	Family	Conservation status
Family: Alligatoridae (alligators and caimans)
American alligator (Alligator mississippiensis) in situ, Chambers County, Texas	Alligator mississippiensis	American alligator	Alligatoridae	IUCN (LC)

== Lizards ==
Order: Squamata
Picture	Scientific name	Common name	Family	Conservation status
Family: Anguidae (anguid and legless lizards)
	Gerrhonotus infernalis	Texas alligator lizard	Anguidae	IUCN (LC)
Western slender glass lizard (Ophisaurus a. attenuatus), Colorado County, Texas	Ophisaurus attenuatus	Western slender glass lizard	Anguidae	IUCN (LC)
Family: Dactyloidae (anoles)
Green anole (Anolis carolinensis) in situ, Polk County, Texas	Anolis carolinensis	Green anole	Dactyloidae	IUCN (LC)
Brown anole (Anolis sagrei), in situ, Harris County, Texas	Anolis sagrei	Brown anole	Dactyloidae	IUCN (LC); Texas (I)
Family: Crotaphytidae (collared and leopard lizards)
	Crotaphytus collaris	Eastern collared lizard	Crotaphytidae	
Reticulated collared lizard (Crotaphytus reticulatus), Duval County, Texas	Crotaphytus reticulatus	Reticulated collared lizard	Crotaphytidae	IUCN (VU); Texas (T)
Longnose leopard lizard (Gambelia wislizenii), Socorro County, New Mexico	Gambelia wislizenii	Longnose leopard lizard	Crotaphytidae	IUCN (LC)
Family: Gekkonidae (geckos)
Texas banded gecko (Coleonyx brevis), Webb County, Texas	Coleonyx brevis	Texas banded gecko	Gekkonidae	IUCN (LC)
	Coleonyx reticulatus	Reticulated gecko	Gekkonidae	IUCN (LC); Texas (T)
	Cyrtopodion scabrum	Rough-tailed gecko	Gekkonidae	IUCN (LC); Texas (I)
	Hemidactylus frenatus	Asian house gecko	Gekkonidae	IUCN (LC); Texas (I)
Mediterranean gecko (Hemidactylus turcicus), in situ, Chambers County, Texas	Hemidactylus turcicus	Mediterranean gecko	Gekkonidae	IUCN (LC); Texas (I)
Family: Iguanidae (iguanas)
Mexican spinytail iguana (Ctenosaura pectinata) from the coast of southwestern Mexico.	Ctenosaura pectinata	Mexican spinytail iguana	Iguanidae	Texas (I)
Family: Phrynosomatidae (earless, sand, horned, and spiny lizards)
Greater earless lizard (Cophosaurus texanus), a male in situ, Big Bend National Park, Texas	Cophosaurus texanus	Greater earless lizard	Phrynosomatidae	IUCN (LC)
	Holbrookia lacerata	Northern spot-tailed earless lizard	Phrynosomatidae	IUCN (NT)
	Holbrookia maculata maculata	Great Plains earless lizard	Phrynosomatidae	
	Holbrookia maculata flavilenta	Chihuahuan earless lizard	Phrynosomatidae	
	Holbrookia maculata perspicua	Prairie earless lizard	Phrynosomatidae	
Keeled earless lizard (Holbrookia propinqua), a female in situ, Tamaulipas, Mexico	Holbrookia propinqua	Keeled earless lizard	Phrynosomatidae	
	Holbrookia subcaudalis	Southern spot-tailed earless lizard	Phrynosomatidae	
Texas horned lizard (Phrynosoma cornutum), Armstrong County, Texas	Phrynosoma cornutum	Texas horned lizard	Phrynosomatidae	IUCN (LC); Texas (T)
Greater short-horned lizard (Phrynosoma hernandesi) in situ, Culberson County, Texas	Phrynosoma hernandesi	Greater short-horned lizard	Phrynosomatidae	IUCN (LC); Texas (T)
Roundtail horned lizard (Phrynosoma modestum), Tamaulipas, Mexico	Phrynosoma modestum	Roundtail horned lizard	Phrynosomatidae	IUCN (LC)
	Sceloporus arenicolus	Dunes sagebrush lizard	Phrynosomatidae	IUCN (VU); Texas (T)
	Sceloporus bimaculosus	Twin-spotted spiny lizard	Phrynosomatidae	
Prairie lizard (Sceloporus consobrinus), in situ, Hardin County, Texas	Sceloporus consobrinus	Prairie lizard	Phrynosomatidae	
Southwestern fence lizard (Sceloporus cowlesi), in situ, Culberson County, Texas	Sceloporus cowlesi	Southwestern fence lizard	Phrynosomatidae	
Blue spiny lizard (Sceloporus cyanogenys)	Sceloporus cyanogenys	Blue spiny lizard	Phrynosomatidae	IUCN (LC)
Mesquite lizard (Sceloporus grammicus)	Sceloporus grammicus	Mesquite lizard	Phrynosomatidae	IUCN (LC)
	Sceloporus merriami annulatus	Big Bend Canyon lizard	Phrynosomatidae	
	Sceloporus merriami longipunctatus	Presidio Canyon lizard	Phrynosomatidae	
	Sceloporus merriami	Canyon lizard	Phrynosomatidae	
Texas spiny lizard (Sceloporus olivaceus) in situ, Colorado County, Texas	Sceloporus olivaceus	Texas spiny lizard	Phrynosomatidae	IUCN (LC)
Crevice spiny lizard (Sceloporus poinsettii), in situ, Mason County, Texas	Sceloporus poinsettii	Crevice spiny lizard	Phrynosomatidae	
Rosebelly lizard (Sceloporus marmoratus), in situ, Hidalgo County, Texas	Sceloporus marmoratus	Rosebelly lizard	Phrynosomatidae	IUCN (LC)
Texas tree lizard (Urosaurus ornatus ornatus), in situ, Kerr County, Texas	Urosaurus ornatus ornatus	Texas tree lizard	Phrynosomatidae	IUCN (LC)
Big Bend tree lizard (Urosaurus ornatus schmidti), in situ, Culberson County, Texas	Urosaurus ornatus schmidti	Big Bend tree lizard	Phrynosomatidae	
	Uta stansburiana	Eastern side-blotched lizard	Phrynosomatidae	
Family: Scincidae (skinks)
Southern coal skink (Plestiodon anthracinus pluvialis), Jefferson County, Missouri	Plestiodon anthracinus pluvialis	Southern coal skink	Scincidae	
Five-lined skink (Plestiodon fasciatus) in situ, Liberty County, Texas	Plestiodon fasciatus	Five-lined skink	Scincidae	
	Plestiodon laticeps	Broadhead skink	Scincidae	IUCN (LC)
	Plestiodon multivirgatus epipleurotus	Variable skink	Scincidae	
	Plestiodon obsoletus	Great Plains Skink	Scincidae	IUCN (LC)
	Plestiodon septentrionalis obtusirostris	Southern prairie skink	Scincidae	
	Plestiodon tetragrammus brevilineatus	Short-lined skink	Scincidae	
Four-lined skink (Plestiodon t. tetragrammus), Tamaulipas, Mexico	Plestiodon tetragrammus tetragrammus	Four-lined skink	Scincidae	
Little brown skink (Scincella lateralis), Walker County, Texas	Scincella lateralis	Little brown skink	Scincidae	IUCN (LC)
Family: Teiidae (whiptails)
Chihuahuan spotted whiptail (Aspidoscelis exsanguis), in situ, Culberson County, Texas	Aspidoscelis exsanguis	Chihuahuan spotted whiptail	Teiidae	IUCN (LC)
Texas spotted whiptail (Aspidoscelis gularis), Hidalgo County, Texas	Aspidoscelis gularis	Texas spotted whiptail	Teiidae	IUCN (LC)
	Aspidoscelis inornata heptagramma	Little striped whiptail	Teiidae	
Laredo striped whiptail (Aspidoscelis laredoensis), in situ, Hidalgo County, Texas	Aspidoscelis laredoensis	Laredo striped whiptail	Teiidae	IUCN (LC)
Marbled whiptail (Aspidoscelis marmorata marmorata) Hidalgo County, New Mexico, regarded by some as Aspidoscelis tigris marmoratus	Aspidoscelis marmorata marmorata	Western marbled whiptail	Teiidae	
	Aspidoscelis marmorata reticuloriens	Eastern marbled whiptail	Teiidae	
	Aspidoscelis neomexicana	New Mexico whiptail	Teiidae	IUCN (LC)
	Aspidoscelis sexlineata stephensae	Texas yellow-headed racerunner	Teiidae	
Prairie racerunner (Aspidoscelis sexlineata) in situ, Hardin County, Texas	Aspidoscelis sexlineata viridis	Prairie racerunner	Teiidae	
Plateau spotted whiptail (Aspidoscelis scalaris), Brewster County, Texas	Aspidoscelis scalaris	Plateau spotted whiptail	Teiidae	
Checkered whiptail (Aspidoscelis tesselata) Sierra County, New Mexico	Aspidoscelis tesselata	Checkered whiptail	Teiidae	IUCN (LC)
Desert grassland whiptail (Aspidoscelis uniparens), Grant County, New Mexico	Aspidoscelis uniparens	Desert grassland whiptail	Teiidae	IUCN (LC)

== Snakes ==
Sub-order: Serpentes
Picture	Scientific name	Common name	Family	Conservation status
Family: Typhlopidae (blindsnakes)
Brahminy blindsnake (Indotyphlops braminus))	Indotyphlops braminus	Brahminy blindsnake	Typhlopidae	IUCN (LC)
Family: Leptotyphlopidae (threadsnakes)
	Rena dulcis dulcis	Plains threadsnake	Leptotyphlopidae	IUCN (LC)
	Rena dulcis rubellum	South Texas threadsnake	Leptotyphlopidae	
	Rena humilis segregus	Trans-Pecos threadsnake	Leptotyphlopidae	
Family: Colubridae (colubrids)
Texas glossy snake (Arizona elegans arenicola), Colorado County, Texas	Arizona elegans arenicola	Texas glossy snake	Colubridae	
	Arizona elegans elegans	Kansas glossy snake	Colubridae	
	Arizona elegans philipi	Painted Desert glossy snake	Colubridae	
Trans-pecos ratsnake (Bogertophis subocularis), Brewster County, Texas	Bogertophis subocularis	Trans-Pecos ratsnake	Colubridae	IUCN (LC)
Western wormsnake (Carphophis vermis), Jefferson County, Missouri	Carphophis vermis	Western wormsnake	Colubridae	IUCN (LC)
Scarletsnake (Cemophora coccinea)	Cemophora coccinea	Scarletsnake	Colubridae	
	Cemophora lineri	Texas scarletsnake	Colubridae	Texas (T)
	Coluber constrictor anthicus	Buttermilk racer	Colubridae	
	Coluber constrictor etheridgei	Tan racer	Colubridae	
	Coluber constrictor flaviventris	Eastern yellowbelly racer	Colubridae	
	Coluber constrictor oaxaca	Mexican racer	Colubridae	
	Coluber constrictor priapus	Southern black racer	Colubridae	
	Coniophanes imperialis	Black-striped snake	Colubridae	Texas (T)
	Diadophis punctatus arnyi	Prairie ringneck snake	Colubridae	
	Diadophis punctatus regalis	Regal ringneck snake	Colubridae	
	Diadophis punctatus stictogenys	Mississippi ringneck snake	Colubridae	IUCN (LC)
	Drymarchon corais erebennus	Texas indigo snake	Colubridae	Texas (T)
Northern speckled racer (Drymobius margaritiferus), Tamaulipas, Mexico	Drymobius margaritiferus	Speckled racer	Colubridae	Texas (T)
	Farancia abacura	Mud snake	Colubridae	IUCN (LC)
	Ficimia streckeri	Mexican hooknose snake	Colubridae	
Chihuahuan hook-nosed snake (Gyalopion canum), Brewster County, Texas	Gyalopion canum	Chihuahuan hook-nosed snake	Colubridae	IUCN (LC)
Rough Earthsnake (Haldea striatula), Harris County, Texas	Haldea striatula	Rough earthsnake	Colubridae	
	Heterodon kennerlyi	Mexican hognose snake	Colubridae	
	Heterodon nasicus gloydi	Dusty hognose snake	Colubridae	
	Heterodon nasicus nasicus	Western hognose snake	Colubridae	IUCN (LC)
	Heterodon platirhinos	Eastern hognose snake	Colubridae	IUCN (LC)
	Hypsiglena jani	Texas night snake	Colubridae	
	Lampropeltis alterna	Gray-banded kingsnake	Colubridae	IUCN (LC)
Prairie kingsnake (Lampropeltis calligaster), Colorado County, Texas	Lampropeltis calligaster	Prairie kingsnake	Colubridae	IUCN (LC)
Speckled kingsnake (Lampropeltis holbrooki), Austin County, Texas	Lampropeltis holbrooki	Speckled kingsnake	Colubridae	
	Lampropeltis splendida	Desert kingsnake	Colubridae	
	Lampropeltis annulata	Mexican milksnake	Colubridae	
	Lampropeltis gentilis	Western milksnake	Colubridae	
Northern cat-eyed snake (Leptodeira septentrionalis), Tamaulipas, Mexico	Leptodeira septentrionalis	Northern cat-eyed snake	Colubridae	IUCN (LC); Texas (T)
Gulf swampsnake (Liodytes rigida sinicola), Chambers County, Texas	Liodytes rigida	Gulf swampsnake	Colubridae	
	Masticophis flagellum flagellum	Eastern coachwhip	Colubridae	IUCN (LC)
	Masticophis flagellum testaceus	Western coachwhip	Colubridae	
	Masticophis schotti schotti	Schott's whipsnake	Colubridae	
	Masticophis schotti ruthveni	Ruthven's whipsnake	Colubridae	
	Masticophis taeniatus taeniatus	Striped whipsnake	Colubridae	
	Masticophis taeniatus girardi	Central Texas whipsnake	Colubridae	
Gulf saltmarsh watersnake (Nerodia clarkii clarkii), Chambers County, Texas	Nerodia clarkii	Saltmarsh watersnake	Colubridae	IUCN (LC)
Mississippi green watersnake (Nerodia cyclopion), Chambers County, Texas	Nerodia cyclopion	Mississippi green watersnake	Colubridae	IUCN (LC)
Plain-bellied watersnake (Nerodia erythrogaster), Chambers County, Texas	Nerodia erythrogaster	Plain-bellied watersnake	Colubridae	IUCN (LC)
Broad-banded watersnake (Nerodia fasciata confluens), Austin County, Texas	Nerodia fasciata confluens	Broad-banded watersnake	Colubridae	IUCN (LC)
	Nerodia fasciata pictiventris	Florida watersnake	Colubridae	Texas (I)
	Nerodia harteri	Brazos watersnake	Colubridae	IUCN (NT); Texas (T)
	Nerodia paucimaculata	Concho watersnake	Colubridae	IUCN (NT); Texas (T)
Diamond-backed watersnake (Nerodia rhombifer), Chambers County, Texas	Nerodia rhombifer	Diamondback watersnake	Colubridae	IUCN (LC)
Midland watersnake (Nerodia sipedon pleuralis), Reynolds County, Missouri	Nerodia sipedon pleuralis	Midland watersnake	Colubridae	IUCN (LC)
	Opheodrys aestivus	Rough green snake	Colubridae	IUCN (LC)
	Opheodrys vernalis	Smooth green snake	Colubridae	IUCN (LC); Texas (T)
	Pantherophis bairdi	Baird's ratsnake	Colubridae	
	Pantherophis emoryi	Great Plains ratsnake	Colubridae	
	Pantherophis obsoletus	Western ratsnake	Colubridae	
Slowinski's cornsnake (Pantherophis slowinskii), in situ, Colorado County, Texas	Pantherophis slowinskii	Slowinski's cornsnake	Colubridae	
	Pituophis catenifer affinis	Sonoran gopher snake	Colubridae	
	Pituophis catenifer sayi	Bull snake	Colubridae	
Louisiana pinesnake (Pituophis ruthveni), Louisiana	Pituophis ruthveni	Louisiana pinesnake	Colubridae	IUCN (EN); Texas (T)
Graham's crawfish snake (Regina grahamii), Chambers County, Texas	Regina grahamii	Graham's crayfish snake	Colubridae	IUCN (LC)
	Rhinocheilus lecontei tessellatus	Texas longnose snake	Colubridae	
	Salvadora deserticola	Big Bend patch-nose snake	Colubridae	Texas (T)
	Salvadora grahamiae grahamiae	Mountain patch-nose snake	Colubridae	
Texas patch-nose snake (Salvadora grahamiae lineata)	Salvadora grahamiae lineata	Texas patch-nose snake	Colubridae	
	Sonora semiannulata	Ground snake	Colubridae	IUCN (LC)
	Storeria dekayi limnetes	Marsh brown snake	Colubridae	
	Storeria dekayi texana	Texas brown snake	Colubridae	
	Storeria occipitomaculata	Redbelly snake	Colubridae	IUCN (LC)
	Tantilla atriceps	Mexican blackhead snake	Colubridae	
	Tantilla cucullata	Big Bend blackhead snake	Colubridae	
	Tantilla gracilis	Flathead snake	Colubridae	IUCN (LC)
	Tantilla hobartsmithi	Southwestern blackhead snake	Colubridae	IUCN (LC)
	Tantilla nigriceps	Plains blackhead snake	Colubridae	IUCN (LC)
	Thamnophis cyrtopsis cyrtopsis	Blackneck garter snake	Colubridae	IUCN (LC)
	Thamnophis marcianus	Checkered garter snake	Colubridae	IUCN (LC)
	Thamnophis proximus diabolicus	Arid land ribbon snake	Colubridae	
	Thamnophis proximus orarius	Gulf Coast ribbon snake	Colubridae	
	Thamnophis proximus proximus	Western ribbon snake	Colubridae	
	Thamnophis proximus rubrilineatus	Redstripe ribbon snake	Colubridae	
	Thamnophis radix	Plains garter snake	Colubridae	IUCN (LC)
	Thamnophis sirtalis annectens	Texas garter snake	Colubridae	
	Thamnophis sirtalis dorsalis	New Mexico garter snake	Colubridae	
	Thamnophis sirtalis sirtalis	Eastern garter snake	Colubridae	IUCN (LC)
Texas lyresnake (Trimorphodon vilkinsonii), Jeff Davis/Presidio County, Texas	Trimorphodon vilkinsonii	Texas lyresnake	Colubridae	IUCN (LC); Texas (T)
	Tropidoclonion lineatum texanum	Texas lined snake	Colubridae	
Smooth earthsnake (Virginia valeriae) Madison County, Iowa	Virginia valeriae	Smooth earthsnake	Colubridae	IUCN (LC)
Family: Elapidae (elapids)
	Micrurus tener	Texas coral snake	Elapidae	IUCN (LC)
Family: Viperidae (vipers)
Eastern copperhead (Agkistrodon contortrix) in situ, Liberty County, Texas	Agkistrodon contortrix	Eastern copperhead	Viperidae	IUCN (LC)
	Agkistrodon laticinctus	Broad-banded copperhead	Viperidae	
Northern cottonmouth (Agkistrodon piscivorus) in situ, Liberty County, Texas	Agkistrodon piscivorus	Northern cottonmouth	Viperidae	
	Crotalus atrox	Western diamondback rattlesnake	Viperidae	IUCN (LC)
Timber rattlesnake (Crotalus horridus), Colorado County, Texas	Crotalus horridus	Timber rattlesnake	Viperidae	IUCN (LC); Texas (T)
Banded rock rattlesnake (Crotalus lepidus klauberi) Catron County, New Mexico	Crotalus lepidus klauberi	Banded rock rattlesnake	Viperidae	
	Crotalus lepidus lepidus	Mottled rock rattlesnake	Viperidae	IUCN (LC)
Eastern black-tailed rattlesnake (Crotalus ornatus)	Crotalus molossus molossus	Northern black-tailed rattlesnake	Viperidae	IUCN (LC)
	Crotalus scutulatus	Mojave rattlesnake	Viperidae	IUCN (LC)
	Crotalus viridis viridis	Prairie rattlesnake	Viperidae	IUCN (LC)
	Sistrurus tergeminus edwardsii	Desert massasauga	Viperidae	
	Sistrurus tergeminus tergeminus	Plains massasauga	Viperidae	
	Sistrurus miliarius streckeri	Western pygmy rattlesnake	Viperidae	

== Turtles ==
Order: Testudines
Picture	Scientific name	Common name	Family	Conservation status
Family: Cheloniidae (marine turtles)
	Caretta caretta	Loggerhead sea turtle	Cheloniidae	IUCN (VU); Texas (T)
Green turtle (Chelonia mydas), Quintana Roo, Mexico	Chelonia mydas	Green turtle	Cheloniidae	IUCN (EN); Texas (T)
	Eretmochelys imbricata	Hawksbill sea turtle	Cheloniidae	IUCN (CR); Texas (E)
	Lepidochelys kempii	Kemp's ridley sea turtle	Cheloniidae	IUCN (CR); Texas (E)
Family: Dermochelidae (leatherback sea turtles)
	Dermochelys coriacea	Leatherback sea turtle	Dermochelidae	IUCN (VU); Texas (E)
Family: Kinosternidae (mud and musk turtles)
	Kinosternon flavescens	Yellow mud turtle	Kinosternidae	IUCN (LC)
Lake Chapala mud turtle (Kinosternon hirtipes chapalaense), a Mexican subspecies of the rough-footed mud turtle (Kinosternon hirtipes)	Kinosternon hirtipes murrayi	Rough-footed mud turtle	Kinosternidae	IUCN (LC)
Mississippi mud turtle (Kinosternon subrubrum hippocrepis), Chambers County, Texas	Kinosternon subrubrum hippocrepis	Mississippi mud turtle	Kinosternidae	
Razorback musk turtle (Sternotherus carinatus), in situ, Hardin County, Texas	Sternotherus carinatus	Razorback musk turtle	Kinosternidae	
Eastern musk turtle (Sternotherus odoratus), in situ, Kerr County, Texas	Sternotherus odoratus	Eastern musk turtle	Kinosternidae	IUCN (LC)
Family: Emydidae (water and box turtles)
	Chrysemys dorsalis	Southern painted turtle	Emydidae	IUCN (LC)
	Chrysemys picta bellii	Western painted turtle	Emydidae	IUCN (LC)
	Deirochelys reticularia	Chicken turtle	Emydidae	
Cagle's map turtle (Graptemys caglei), hatchling	Graptemys caglei	Cagle's map turtle	Emydidae	IUCN (EN)
Ouachita map turtle (Graptemys ouachitensis) in situ, Fannin County, Texas	Graptemys ouachitensis	Oachita map turtle	Emydidae	IUCN (LC)
Sabine map turtle (Graptemys sabinensis) in situ, Hardin County, Texas	Graptemys sabinensis	Sabine map turtle	Emydidae	IUCN (LC)
Mississippi map turtles (Graptemys pseudogeographica kohnii), adult female left, adult male right, in situ, Liberty County, Texas	Graptemys pseudogeographica kohnii	Mississippi map turtle	Emydidae	IUCN (LC)
Texas map turtle (Graptemys versa), in situ, Travis County, Texas	Graptemys versa	Texas map turtle	Emydidae	IUCN (LC)
Texas diamond-backed terrapin (Malaclemys terrapin littoralis), Galveston County Texas	Malaclemys terrapin	Diamondback terrapin	Emydidae	IUCN (VU)
Eastern river cooter (Pseudemys concinna), in situ, Marion County, Texas	Pseudemys concinna concinna	Eastern river cooter	Emydidae	
Rio Grande cooter (Pseudemys gorzugi), hatchling, Kinney County, Texas	Pseudemys gorzugi	Rio Grande cooter	Emydidae	IUCN (NT)
	Pseudemys nelsoni	Florida red-bellied turtle	Emydidae	IUCN (LC)
Texas river cooter (Pseudemys texana), in situ, Kerr County, Texas	Pseudemys texana	Texas river cooter	Emydidae	IUCN (LC)
Three-toed box turtle (Terrapene triunguis), in situ, Walker County, Texas	Terrapene triunguis	Three-toed box turtle	Emydidae	IUCN (VU)
	Terrapene ornata luteola	Desert box turtle	Emydidae	
	Terrapene ornata ornata	Ornate box turtle	Emydidae	IUCN (NT)
	Trachemys gaigeae	Big Bend slider	Emydidae	IUCN (VU)
Red-erred slider (Trachemys scripta elegans), in situ, Harris County, Texas	Trachemys scripta elegans	Red-eared slider	Emydidae	
Family: Chelydridae (snapping turtles)
	Chelydra serpentina	Common snapping turtle	Chelydridae	IUCN (LC)
	Macrochelys temminckii	Alligator snapping turtle	Chelydridae	IUCN (VU)
Family: Trionychidae (softshell turtles)
	Apalone mutica	Smooth softshell turtle	Trionychidae	IUCN (LC)
Texas spiny shoftshell turtle (Apalone spinifera emoryi), Brewster County, Texas	Apalone spinifera emoryi	Texas spiny softshell turtle	Trionychidae	
	Apalone spinifera guadalupensis	Guadalupe spiny softshell turtle	Trionychidae	
Pallid spiny shoftshell (Apalone spinifera pallida), Colorado County, Texas	Apalone spinifera pallida	Pallid spiny softshell turtle	Trionychidae	
Family: Testudinidae (gopher tortoises)
Texas tortoise (Gopherus berlandieri), Val Verde County, Texas	Gopherus berlandieri	Texas tortoise	Testudinidae	IUCN (LC); Texas (T)

== See also ==
- List of Texas amphibians
