= Piscasaw Creek =

Physical characteristics
- Source
  - location: Walworth County west of Walworth, Wisconsin
  - coordinates: 42°32′45″N 88°38′55″W
  - elevation: 960 ft (290 m)
- Mouth
  - location: Confluence with the Kishwaukee River at Belvidere, Illinois
  - coordinates: 42°15′43″N 88°49′04″W
  - elevation: 755 ft (230 m)
- Length: 32 mi (51 km)

Basin features
- Progression: Piscasaw Creek → Kishwaukee → Rock → Mississippi → Gulf of Mexico
- GNIS ID: 415738

Piscasaw Creek is a 31.6-mile-long (50.9 km) tributary of the Kishwaukee River in the U.S. states of Wisconsin and Illinois. Rising in Walworth County, Wisconsin, it passes through McHenry County, Illinois before discharging into the Kishwaukee in Boone County, Illinois. Piscasaw Creek's mouth is located near Belvidere, Illinois.

== Course ==
Piscasaw Creek originates in Walworth County, Wisconsin, and travels through McHenry and Boone counties until it meets the Kishwaukee River near Belvidere, Illinois. The mouth of the Piscasaw along the Kishwaukee is at a place traditionally known as Red Horse Bend.

== Description ==
Piscasaw Creek is classified as a "Class A" drainage by the criteria established by the Illinois Environmental Protection Agency, signifying the small river's relative health with respect to waterborne nutrients and chemicals. Traditional dairy farming operations around Harvard, Illinois have not overloaded the creek's biotic capacity. However, exponential residential development starting in the 2000s is expected to present new challenges to the creek.

The land around Piscasaw Creek is relatively flat and does not slope much. Much of the creek is bordered by strips of damp soil and wetland, with cattails and willow trees. The wetlands have helped to maintain water quality. The Piscasaw Creek watershed, including its tributaries, drains over 120 square miles (310 km^{2}) of land, making it the fourth largest tributary of the Kishwaukee River.

In 2008 the Illinois Natural History Survey examined Piscasaw Creek at two different sites in McHenry County's Beck's Woods. At site one the creek was 12 meters (m) wide and 20 centimeters (cm) deep. The river bed had a substrate of cobble and the stream at that site consisted entirely of riffles. At site number two the creek was 10 m wide and 30 cm deep, this area was also dominated by riffles.

== Tributaries ==
Piscasaw Creek has several small tributaries. These include: Lawrence Creek, Geryune Creek, Little Beaver Creek, and Mokeler Creek.

== Wildlife ==
Piscasaw Creek contains populations of Chub, sucker, rock bass, smallmouth bass, bluegill, green sunfish, brown trout, and rainbow trout. The rainbow trout in Piscasaw Creek are stocked each year by the Illinois Department of Natural Resources and the McHenry County Conservation District. Brown trout populations are most likely natural, since no stocking efforts were made. Both species are known to breed successfully, though the overwhelming populations of various chub and sucker often deter most fisherman from consistently fishing it. In total, 46 species of fish have been documented in Piscasaw Creek. Aside from fish, 17 species of mussel have been collected from the creek. Reptiles and amphibians in and around the Piscasaw include the green frog, ornate box turtle, northern leopard frog, fox snake, Chicago garter snake and the plains garter snake.

Multiple state and federal endangered and threatened species have been identified within the Piscasaw Creek area. The mussels Ellipto dilatata (Spike) and Alasmidonta viridis (Slippershell) have been documented in the creek; the former is threatened, the latter endangered. An endangered plant, the speckled alder, grows along the creek too. Piscasaw Creek has been documented to sustain river otters. The Boone County Conservation District has identified the state-threatened Blanding's turtle in the creek.

== Public use ==
Two stretches of land along Piscasaw Creek have been preserved for public use:

- Beck's Woods near Chemung, Illinois, is owned and operated by the McHenry County Conservation District.
- Piscasaw Fen, near Poplar Grove, Illinois, is a recent land purchase by the Boone County Conservation District.

== See also ==
- Mokeler Creek
