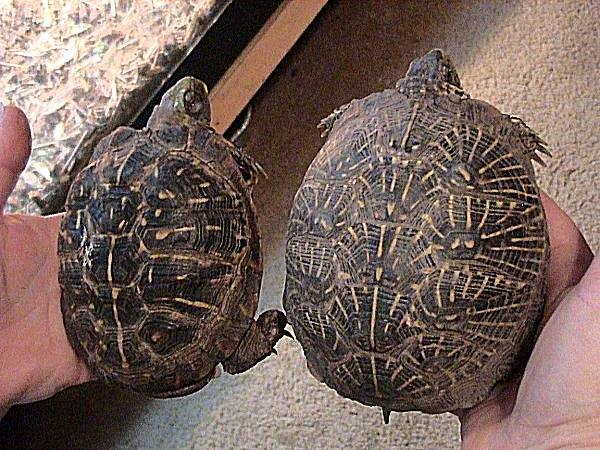
- T. o. ornata (left) and T. o. luteola (right)

Conservation status
- Near Threatened (IUCN 3.1)
- CITES Appendix II

Scientific classification
- Kingdom: Animalia
- Phylum: Chordata
- Class: Reptilia
- Order: Testudines
- Suborder: Cryptodira
- Family: Emydidae
- Genus: Terrapene
- Species: T. ornata

Binomial name
- Terrapene ornata Agassiz, 1857

= Terrapene ornata =

Species of turtle

Terrapene ornata is a species of North American box turtle sometimes referred to as the western box turtle or the ornate box turtle. It is one of two recognized species of box turtle in the United States, having two subspecies. The second recognized species of box turtle is the eastern box turtle, Terrapene carolina. T. carolina has six subspecies, two of which are endemic to Mexico.

== Taxonomy ==
There are two subspecies of T. ornata:

- Ornate box turtle, Terrapene ornata ornata (Agassiz, 1857)
- Desert box turtle, Terrapene ornata luteola (Smith & Ramsey, 1952)

== Description ==
T. ornata has a shell that is less domed than other species of box turtle, appearing to be slightly flattened. Their coloration is generally black or dark brown, with yellow striping. T. o. luteola tends to have more striping than T. o. ornata.

T. o. ornata are generally more bold in their approach to predators, often stretching their legs and head out in an attempt to look big. T. o. luteola are more likely to close up into their shell and utilize their hinged plastron as protection.

Both sub-species, although they live in dry, arid environments, will dig deep burrows to escape the heat and allow access to higher humidity content.

== Range ==
T. ornata ornata is found in the central United States from western Indiana, to eastern Texas, and into Louisiana; it can also be found in Northeastern New Mexico. T. ornata luteola inhabits the driest areas of all the box turtle species, and is found in western Texas, New Mexico, Arizona, and adjoining areas of northern Mexico.

== Conservation ==
In Indiana, the ornate box turtle is listed as an endangered species.

== Symbol ==
The species became the official state reptile of Kansas in 1986.

== Predation ==
Due to their small size, ornate box turtles are easily targeted by predators. Predators of this turtle include coyotes, striped skunks, Chihuahuan ravens, American crows, eastern copperheads, raccoons, Virginia opossums, American minks, red foxes and domestic dogs.
