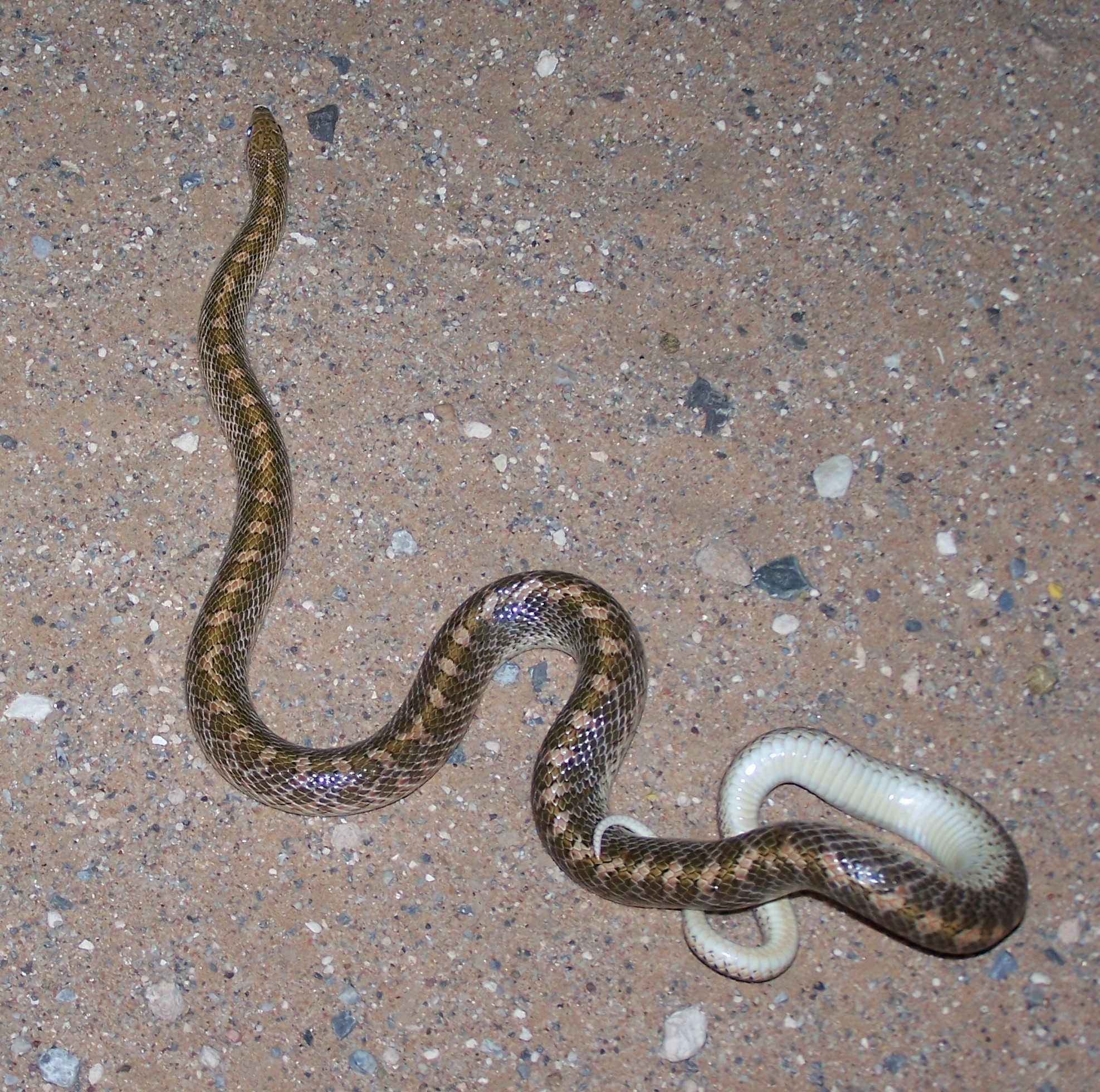

Scientific classification
- Domain: Eukaryota
- Kingdom: Animalia
- Phylum: Chordata
- Class: Reptilia
- Order: Squamata
- Suborder: Serpentes
- Family: Colubridae
- Genus: Arizona
- Species: A. elegans
- Subspecies: A. e. philipi

Trinomial name
- Arizona elegans philipi Klauber, 1946

= Arizona elegans philipi =

Subspecies of snake

Arizona elegans philipi, commonly known as the Painted Desert glossy snake, is a subspecies of glossy snakes, a nonvenomous colubrid endemic to North America.

== Etymology ==
The epithet philipipi is in honor of Philip Monroe Klauber, son of herpetologist Laurence Monroe Klauber who named the subspecies.

== Geographic range ==
It is found in the south-western United States, from the far western tip of Texas, through New Mexico, and into Arizona, as well as into northern Mexico. Its range overlaps that of other glossy snake subspecies, and interbreeding is likely. Thus, distinguishing subspecies which share range is often difficult.

== Description ==
The Painted Desert glossy snake is typically a light tan brown in color, with darker brown blotches down the length of the back. This subspecies usually has around 60 blotches, which is a greater number than in other subspecies. Each blotch is usually edged with black. The underside is usually solid cream or white in color. The coloration can vary, lighter or darker, depending on the soil and elevation of the localized habitat, with specimens from higher elevations often being darker in color. Adults can be from 20 to 35 inches (50 to 90 cm) in total length. They have a thin body, with smooth dorsal scales, and the pupil of the eye is round.

In females of Arizona elegans philipi the length of the tail is greater than 13.5% of the total body length; in males, greater than 14.5%. In most specimens the smooth dorsal scales are arranged in 27 rows at midbody.

== Habitat ==
Their preferred habitat is sandy and rocky arid regions, it is often found in areas of lightly vegetated with creosote bush and sagebrush.

== Diet ==
Their diet consists of lizards, and small rodents. They are nocturnal, and can often be found foraging in roadside ditches in the late evening.

== Reproduction ==
Mating occurs in spring, and the female lays a clutch of up to 24 eggs which hatch in the fall. Hatchlings are 9-11 inches (23–28 cm) in total length.
