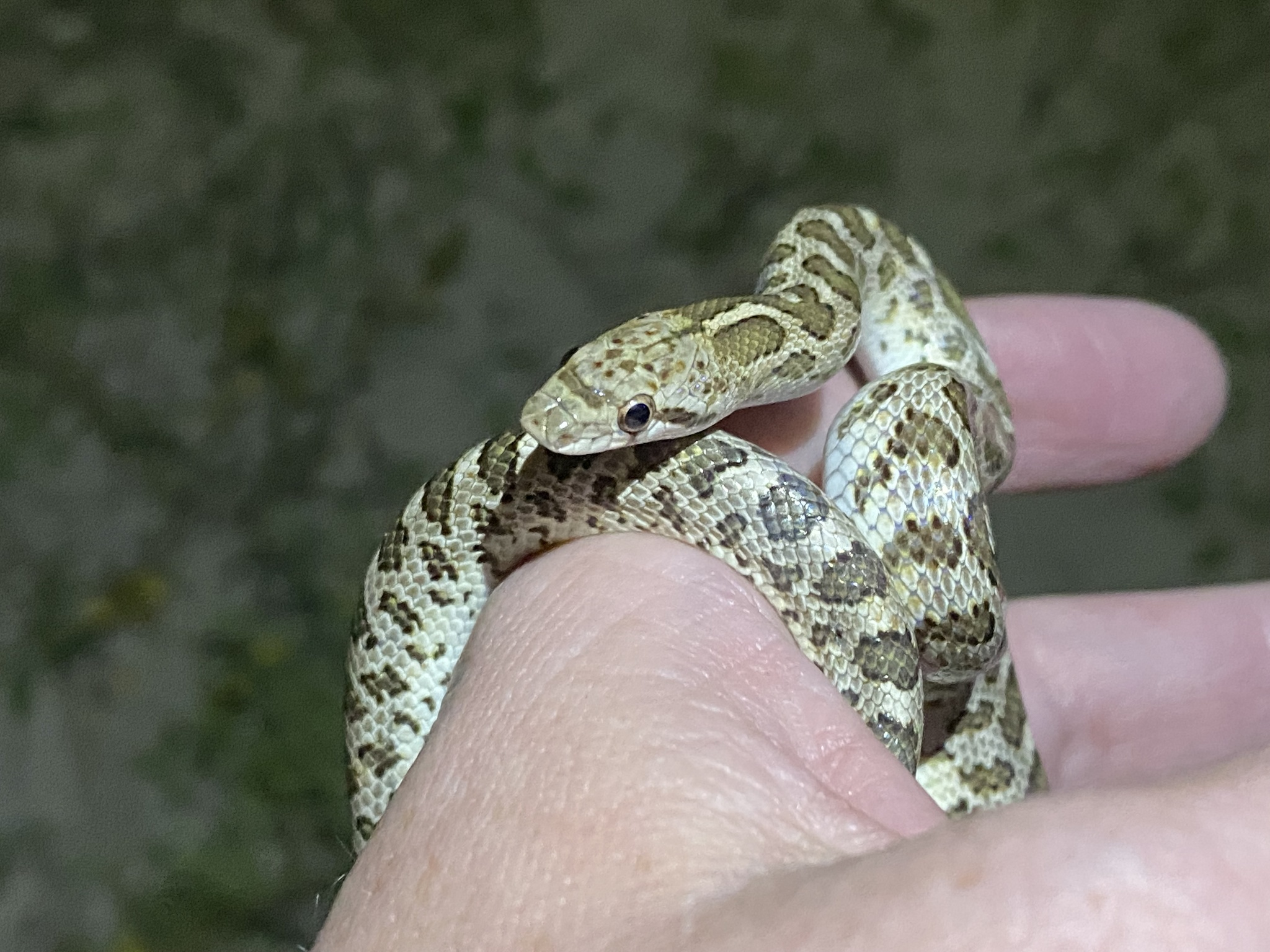

Scientific classification
- Domain: Eukaryota
- Kingdom: Animalia
- Phylum: Chordata
- Class: Reptilia
- Order: Squamata
- Suborder: Serpentes
- Family: Colubridae
- Genus: Arizona
- Species: A. elegans
- Subspecies: A. e. arenicola

Trinomial name
- Arizona elegans arenicola Dixon, 1960

= Arizona elegans arenicola =

Subspecies of snake

Arizona elegans arenicola, commonly known as the Texas glossy snake, is a subspecies of nonvenomous colubrid snake endemic to North America.

== Geographic range ==
It is found in the Chihuahuan Desert region of the southwestern United States and northern Mexico. Its range overlaps that of other glossy snake subspecies, and interbreeding is likely. Thus, distinguishing subspecies which share range is often difficult.

== Description ==
The Texas glossy snake is typically a tan brown in color, with darker brown blotches down the length of the back. Each blotch is usually edged with black. Its underside is usually solid cream or white in color. Their coloration can vary, lighter or darker, depending on the soil and elevation of their localized habitat. They can grow from 20 to 35 inches (51 to 89 centimetres) in length. They have a thin body, smooth scales, and eyes with round pupils.

A. e. arenicola has 50 or fewer dorsal blotches. Females have 221 or more ventrals, and males have 212 or more ventrals. The smooth dorsal scales are arranged in 29 or 31 rows at midbody.

== Habitat ==
Their preferred habitat is sandy and rocky semiarid regions, and it is often found in areas lightly vegetated with creosote and sagebrush.

== Diet ==
Their diet consists of lizards, and small rodents.

== Behavior ==
They are nocturnal, and can often be found foraging in roadside ditches in the late evening.

== Reproduction ==
Mating occurs in the spring, and the female lays a clutch of up to 24 eggs which hatch in the fall. Hatchlings are 9–11 inches (23–28 centimetres) in total length.
