= Arizona pacata =

Conservation status
- Least Concern (IUCN 3.1)

Scientific classification
- Kingdom: Animalia
- Phylum: Chordata
- Class: Reptilia
- Order: Squamata
- Suborder: Serpentes
- Family: Colubridae
- Genus: Arizona
- Species: A. pacata

Binomial name
- Arizona pacata Klauber, 1946

Species of snake

Arizona pacata, the peninsular glossy snake, is a species of snake in the family Colubridae. The species is found in Mexico.
