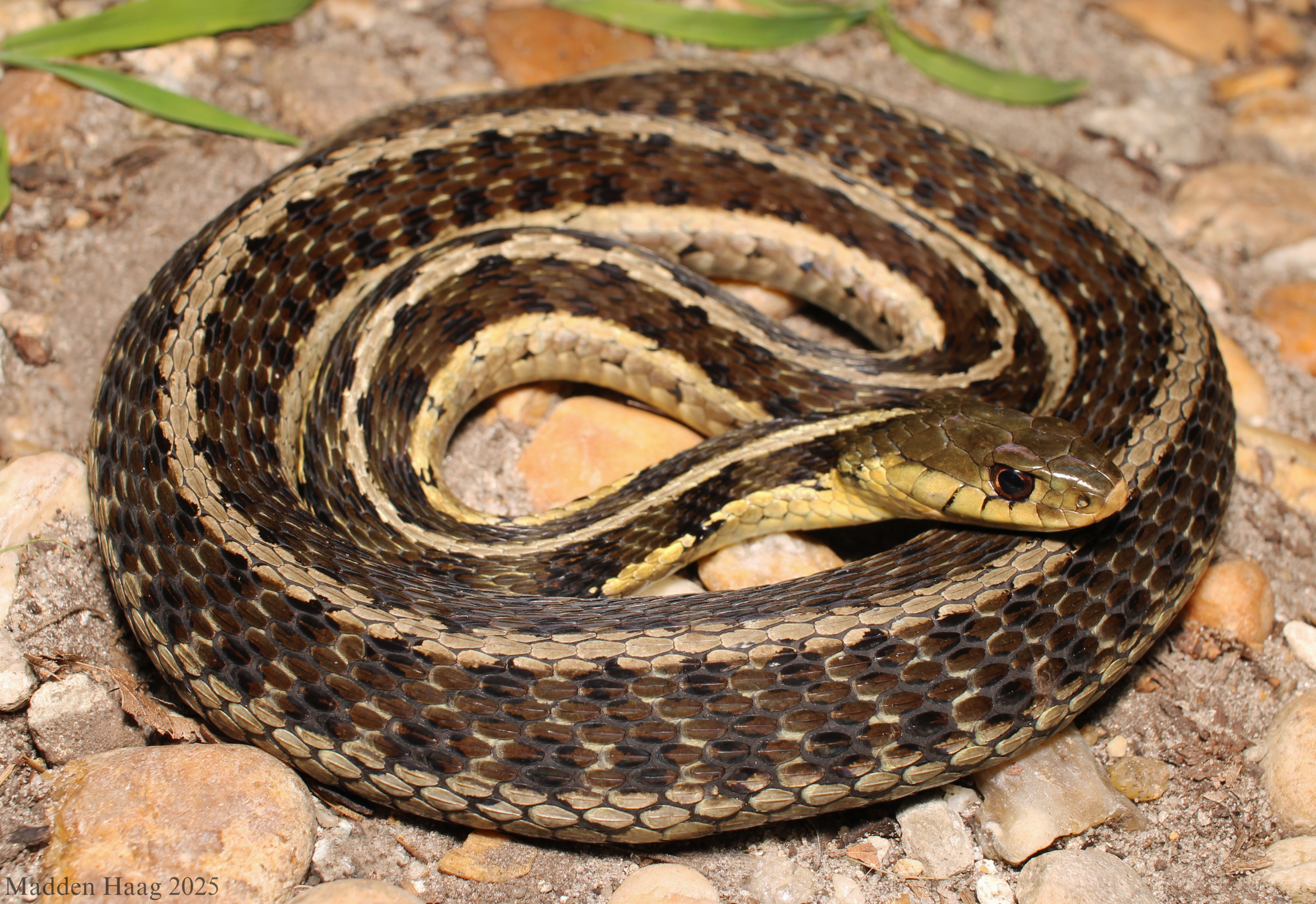
- Chicago garter snake (Thamnophis sirtalis semifasciatus)

Scientific classification
- Domain: Eukaryota
- Kingdom: Animalia
- Phylum: Chordata
- Class: Reptilia
- Order: Squamata
- Suborder: Serpentes
- Family: Colubridae
- Genus: Thamnophis
- Species: T. sirtalis
- Subspecies: T. s. semifasciatus

Trinomial name
- Thamnophis sirtalis semifasciatus (Cope, 1892)

Synonyms
- Eutænia sirtalis semifasciata Cope, 1892

= Chicago garter snake =

Subspecies of snake

The Chicago garter snake (Thamnophis sirtalis semifasciatus), is a subspecies of the common garter snake native to the Chicago, United States, region. It was described by Edward Drinker Cope in 1892, and can be found in the vicinity of rural waterways in northeastern Illinois, such as Piscasaw Creek in Boone County and McHenry County, Illinois.

== Description ==
=== Identification ===
The Illinois Natural History Survey describes the Chicago garter snake as a medium-sized, up to 100 cm (39 in) in total length, including the tail), dark brown or black snake with a yellow or gray mid-back stripe, a yellow stripe on each side, and a gray-green belly with dark spots on the edges of most of the belly scales. The snake's head is usually without parietal light spots. Some specimens have red coloring between the side scales.

One feature that distinguishes the Chicago garter snake from other garter snake subspecies, especially the eastern garter snake (Thamnophis sirtalis sirtalis), is, in Thamnophis sirtalis semifasciatus, the snake's side stripe is broken, near the snake's head, into a dashed line by black crossbars.

=== Habitat ===
The snake prefers forest and edge habitats near a body of water. It is a cold-tolerant snake that occasionally emerges from hibernation to bask on warm winter days. The snake emerges from hibernation upon the spring thaw (March or April), and typically mates immediately after. The females, like other garter snakes, give birth to a clutch of 15–80 live young; parturition is typically in July through early October. The newborn snakes are 15–20 cm (6–8 in) in total length.

Its diet includes fish, amphibians, young birds, and invertebrates such as earthworms, slugs, and snails. The snake is often killed by human beings and by predatory vertebrates, especially hawks and owls.
