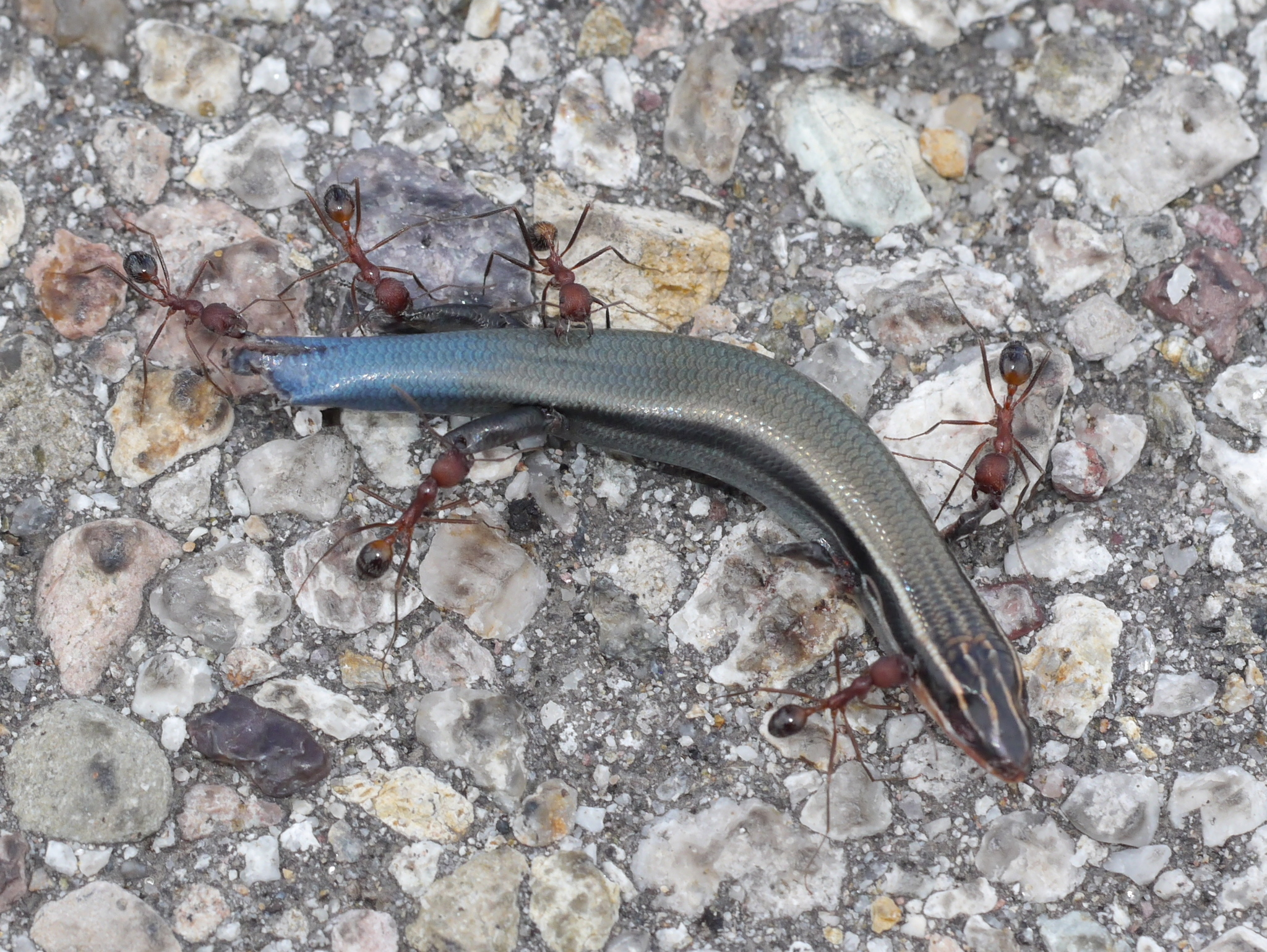

Conservation status
- Least Concern (IUCN 3.1)

Scientific classification
- Domain: Eukaryota
- Kingdom: Animalia
- Phylum: Chordata
- Class: Reptilia
- Order: Squamata
- Family: Scincidae
- Genus: Plestiodon
- Species: P. callicephalus

Binomial name
- Plestiodon callicephalus (Bocourt, 1879)
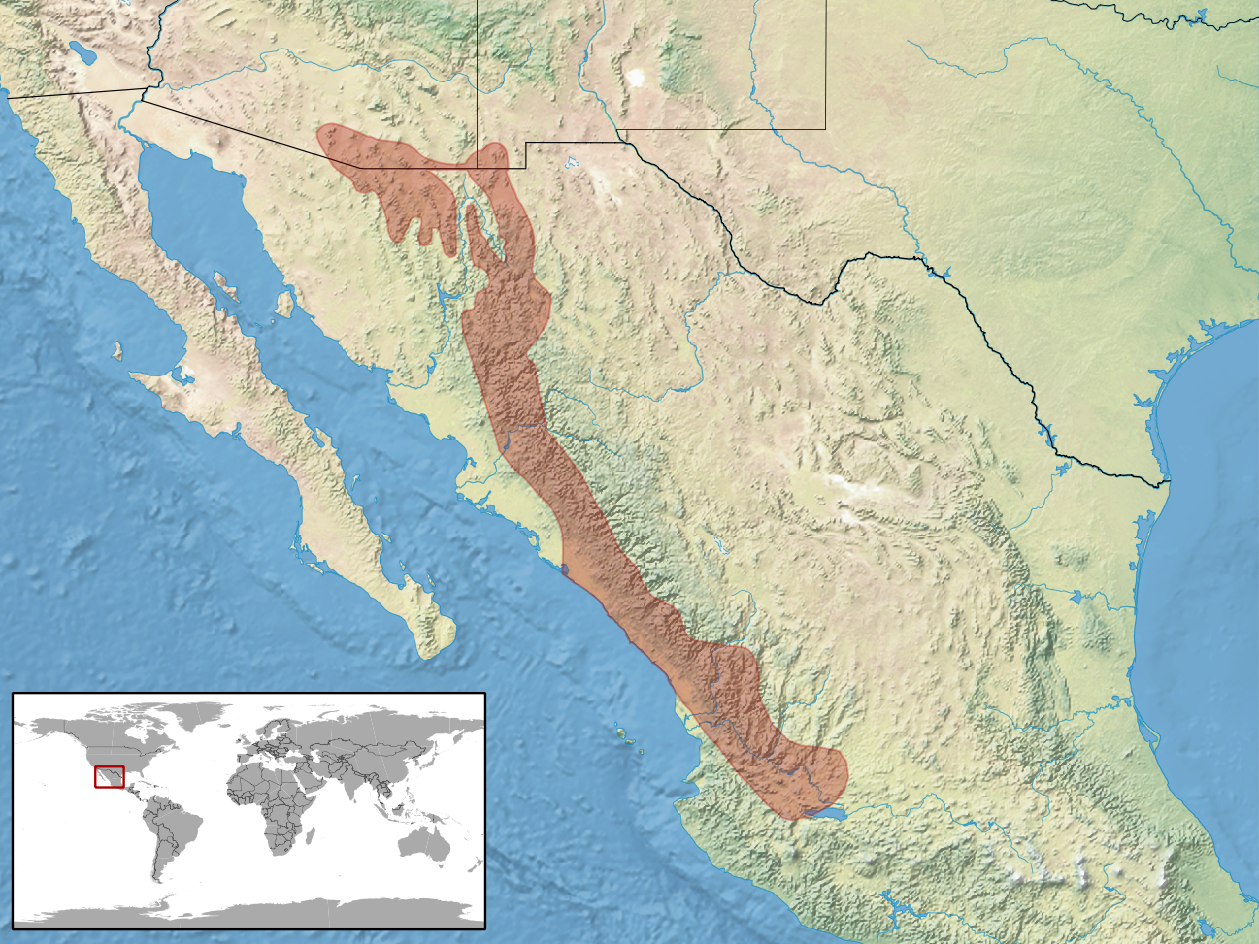

Synonyms
- Eumeces callicephalus Bocourt, 1879

= Plestiodon callicephalus =

Species of lizard

Plestiodon callicephalus, commonly known as the mountain skink, is a species of lizard, a medium-sized member of the Plestiodon skinks, endemic to North America.

== Taxonomy ==
At least one herpetologist has considered this species to be a subspecies of Plestiodon tetragrammus under the scientific name P. tetragrammus callicephalus, but the more common classification considers it to be a separate species based on differences in appearance and its distinct geographic distribution.

== Description ==
The mountain skink is a medium-sized skink reaching a maximum length from snout to vent of about 7.5 cm (3.0 in). Its body is olive to brown in color, with black stripes on the sides. On the head, it features a distinctive, roughly Y-shaped light line pattern, which gave rise to its scientific name: callicephalus is Greek and means "beautiful head".

Like many other Plestiodon, juvenile mountain skinks have a bright blue tail. However, contrary to most other species of this genus, adults retain this color, although it does fade a little with age.

== Geographic range ==
The mountain skink occurs from southeastern Arizona and extreme southwestern New Mexico southward to Nayarit and Jalisco in Mexico.

In the U.S., the species is very localized. In New Mexico, mountain skinks are found only in the southern Peloncillo Mountains (Hidalgo County) of southwest Hidalgo County. It is known only from Geronimo Trail and Guadalupe Canyon, where it is uncommon in its limited habitat. In Arizona, the mountain skink occurs in the Coronado National Forest.

== Conservation status ==
Throughout its range in Mexico, the species seems secure, although many local populations may be jeopardized by habitat loss.

In New Mexico, the species is classified as "critically impaired".

== Habitat ==
The mountain skink is found in a wide variety of habitat, ranging from sea level to nearly 2,000 m (about 6,560 ft). It prefers areas with abundant and well-rotted leaf litter, providing cover and places for laying eggs.

== Behavior ==
Plestiodon callicephalus is a terrestrial skink, spending most of its time foraging on the ground, hunting for small invertebrates. It is a good burrower, burrowing its own den.
