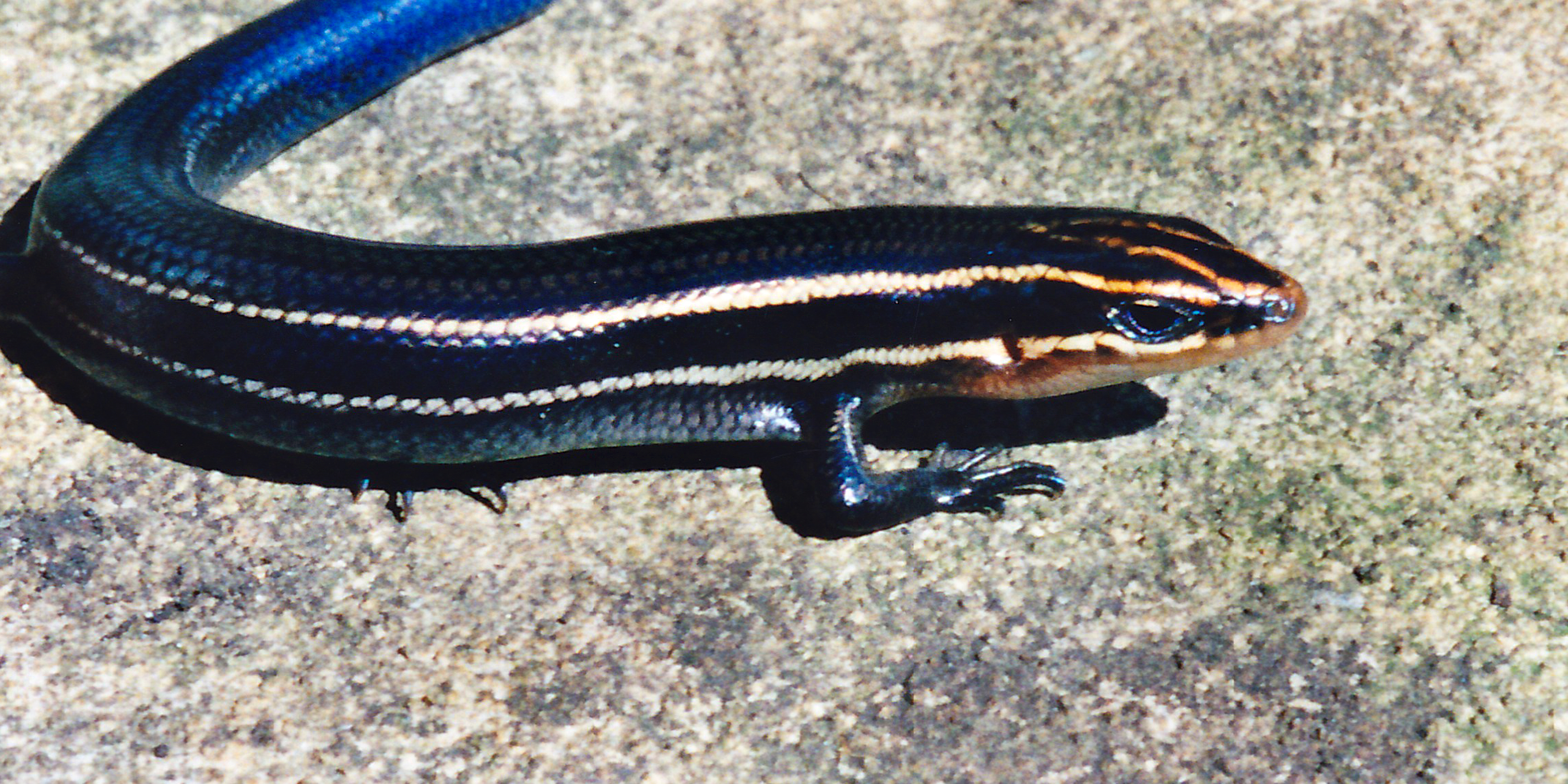
- Plestiodon t. tetragrammus, municipality of Aldama, Tamaulipas, Mexico

Conservation status
- Least Concern (IUCN 3.1)

- Secure (NatureServe)

Scientific classification
- Kingdom: Animalia
- Phylum: Chordata
- Class: Reptilia
- Order: Squamata
- Family: Scincidae
- Genus: Plestiodon
- Species: P. tetragrammus

Binomial name
- Plestiodon tetragrammus Baird, 1859
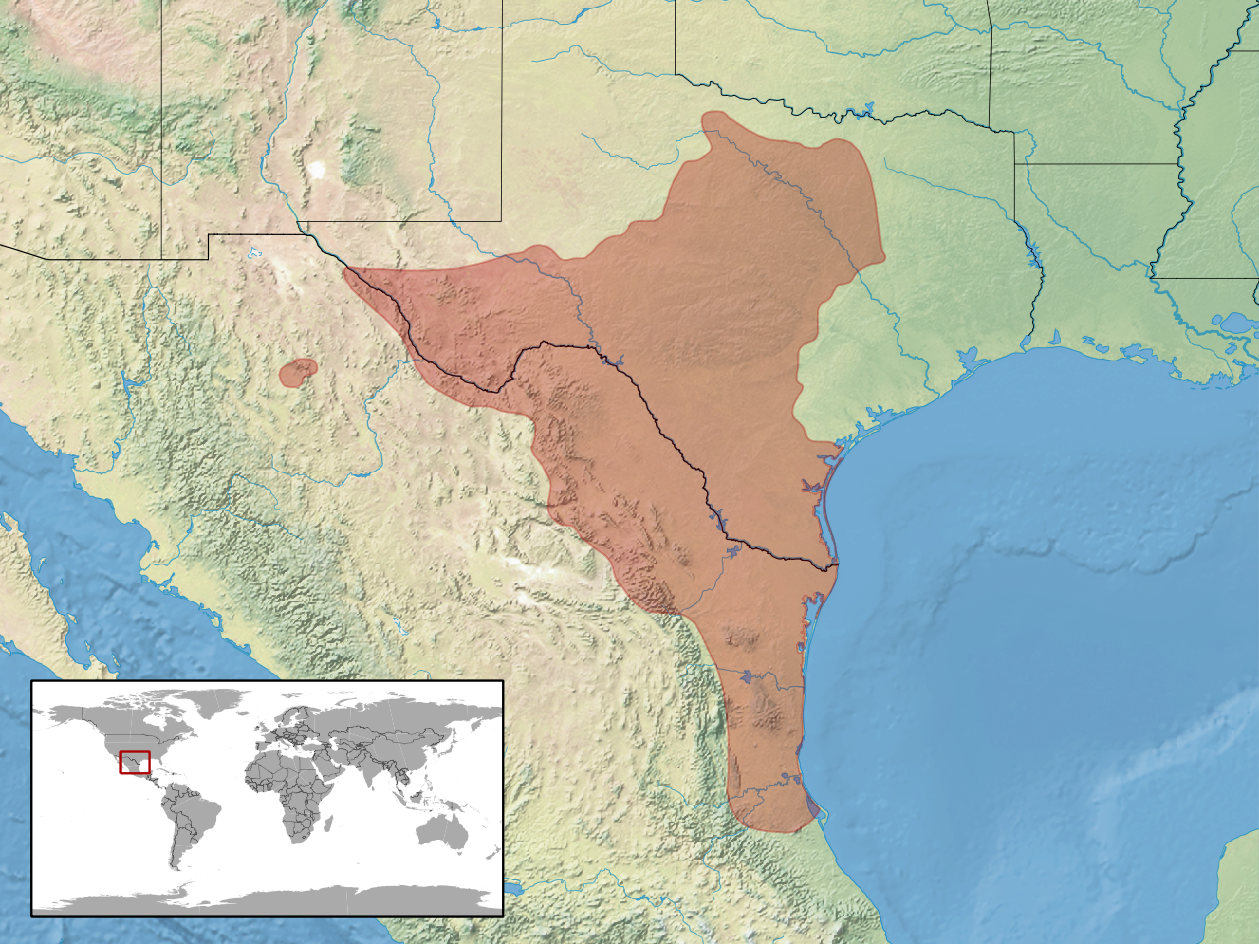

Synonyms
- Eumeces tetragrammus (Baird, 1859)

= Plestiodon tetragrammus =

Four-lined skink

Species of lizard

The four-lined skink (Plestiodon tetragrammus) is a species of lizard, which is endemic to North America. It is a medium-sized member of the Plestiodon skinks.

== Taxonomy ==
At least two subspecies are recognized, including the nominotypical subspecies:

- Long-lined skink, P. t. tetragrammus Baird, 1859
- Short-lined skink, P. t. brevilineatus (Cope, 1880)

Some herpetologists also consider the mountain skink (Plestiodon callicephalus) to be a subspecies of Plestiodon tetragrammus under the name P. t. callicephalus. Others, however, prefer to treat the mountain skink as a distinct species because its range is geographically distinct and there are morphological differences.

== Description ==
The two subspecies can be distinguished by their color and their stripes. The long-lined skink is gray to light brown in color and has light stripes from the eyes extending to beyond its forelegs, whereas the short-lined skink is darker in color and has stripes that end before the forelegs.

Juveniles of both subspecies have — like many Plestiodon — a blue tail; this color fades with age.

Adults reach a maximum SVL (Snout-Vent-Length) of some 7.5 cm (about 3 inches), and a TL (total length) of about 18 cm (7.1 in).

== Geographic range ==
Plestiodon tetragrammus occurs in northern Mexico and along the Mexican Gulf coast and in western and central Texas.

== Habitat ==
Both subspecies live in lightly wooded areas, with the short-lined skink having a preference for rocky areas, whereas the long-lined skink is also found in grasslands.

== Reproduction ==
The female lays about 5 to 12 eggs once a year, which she broods. Males develop orange (short-lined skink) to red (long-lined skink) coloration of the head during the breeding season.
