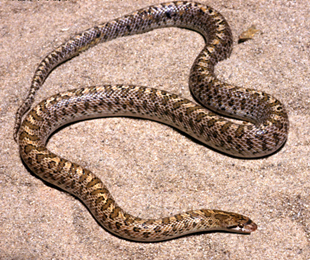
- Arizona elegans occidentalis

Conservation status
- Least Concern (IUCN 3.1)

Scientific classification
- Kingdom: Animalia
- Phylum: Chordata
- Class: Reptilia
- Order: Squamata
- Suborder: Serpentes
- Family: Colubridae
- Genus: Arizona
- Species: A. elegans

Binomial name
- Arizona elegans Kennicott in Baird, 1859

Synonyms
- Arizona elegans Kennicott in Baird, 1859; Pityophis elegans — Cope, 1875; Rhinechis elegans — Cope, 1886; Coluber arizonae — Boulenger, 1894; Arizona elegans — Blanchard, 1924

= Glossy snake =

Species of snake

Arizona elegans is a species of medium-sized colubrid snake commonly referred to as the glossy snake or the faded snake, which is native to southwestern United States and northern Mexico. It has several subspecies. Some have recommended that A. elegans occidentalis be granted full species status.

== Subspecies ==
Subspecies of Arizona elegans include:

- Arizona elegans arenicola Dixon, 1960 – Texas glossy snake
- Arizona elegans candida Klauber, 1946 – Western Mojave glossy snake
- Arizona elegans eburnata Klauber, 1946 – Desert glossy snake
- Arizona elegans elegans Kennicott, 1859 – Kansas glossy snake
- Arizona elegans expolita Klauber, 1946 – Chihuahua glossy snake
- Arizona elegans noctivaga Klauber, 1946 – Arizona glossy snake
- Arizona elegans occidentalis Blanchard, 1924 – California glossy snake
- Arizona elegans philipi Klauber, 1946 – Painted Desert glossy snake

== Description ==
The glossy snake and its many subspecies are all similar in appearance to gopher snakes. However, they are smaller than gopher snakes, with narrow, pointed heads, and a variety of skin patterns and colors. They appear "washed-out" or pale, hence the common name, "faded snakes".

Most subspecies are ca. 75–130 cm (ca. 30-50 inches) in total length. The maximum recorded total length for the species is 142 cm (56 in).

They are shades of tan, brown, and gray with spotted patterns on their smooth, glossy skin, and a white or cream-colored unmarked ventral surface. Coloration often varies in relation to the color of the soil in a snake's native habitat.

== Habitat ==
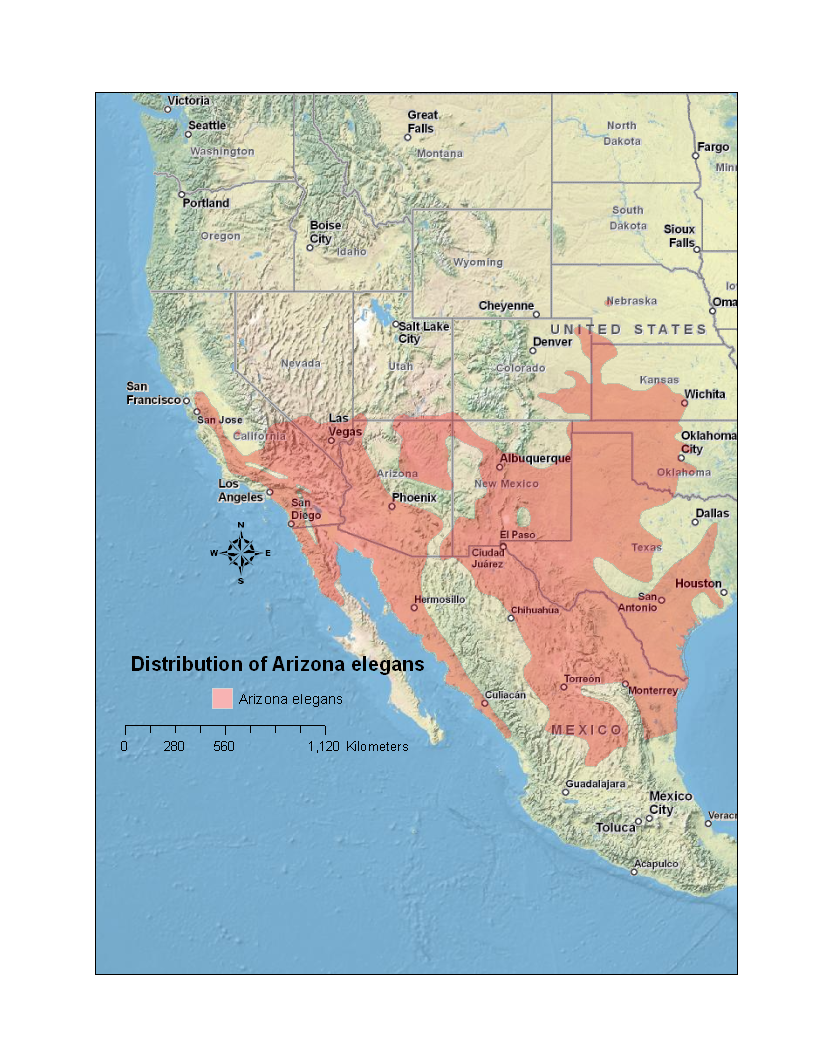
Range of Arizona elegans

Habitat is normally semi-arid grasslands of the southwestern United States, from California in the west to Kansas in the east and as far south as Texas, and northern Mexico.

== Behavior and diet ==
They are nonvenomous, nocturnal predators of small lizards.

== Reproduction ==
Glossy snakes are oviparous. Adults breed in the late spring and early summer. Clutches average from 10 to 20 eggs. The eggs hatch in early summers and the newly hatched young are approximately 25 cm (9.8 in) in total length.
