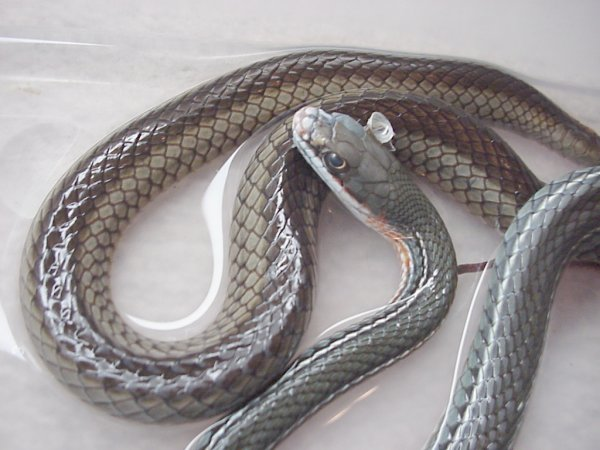
- Masticophis schotti schotti

Conservation status
- Least Concern (IUCN 3.1)

Scientific classification
- Kingdom: Animalia
- Phylum: Chordata
- Class: Reptilia
- Order: Squamata
- Suborder: Serpentes
- Family: Colubridae
- Genus: Masticophis
- Species: M. schotti

Binomial name
- Masticophis schotti Baird & Girard, 1853

Synonyms
- Coluber schotti (Baird & Girard, 1853); Masticophis taeniatus schotti Baird & Girard, 1853; Coluber taeniatus schotti (Baird & Girard, 1853); Masticophis ruthveni Ortenburger, 1923; Masticophis taeniatus ruthveni Ortenburger, 1923; Coluber taeniatus ruthveni (Ortenburger, 1923); Masticophis taeniatus australis Smith, 1941; Coluber taeniatus australis (Smith, 1941)

= Masticophis schotti =

Species of snake

Masticophis schotti, commonly known as Schott's whip snake, is a species of snake in the family Colubridae.

== Geographic range ==
The species is found in United States in Texas and in western Mexico. It lives up to an altitude of 2300 meters.

== Subspecies ==
- Masticophis schotti ruthveni Ortenburger, 1923 – Ruthven's whip snake
- Masticophis schotti schotti Baird & Girard, 1853 – Schott's whip snake

== Etymology ==
Its species name was given to it in honor of Arthur Schott. The subspecies Masticophis schotti ruthveni is named in honor of Alexander Grant Ruthven.

== Original publications ==
- Baird & Girard, 1853 : Catalogue of North American Reptiles in the Museum of the Smithsonian Institution. Part 1.-Serpents. Smithsonian Institution, Washington, p. 1-172 (Full text).
- Ortenburger, 1923 : A note on the genera Coluber and Masticophis and a description of a new species of Masticophis. Occasional papers of the Museum of Zoology, University of Michigan, No. 139, p. 1-14 (Full text).
- Smith, 1941 : Notes on Mexican snakes of the genus Masticophis. Journal of the Washington Academy of Sciences, vol. 31, No. 9, p. 388-398 (Full text).
