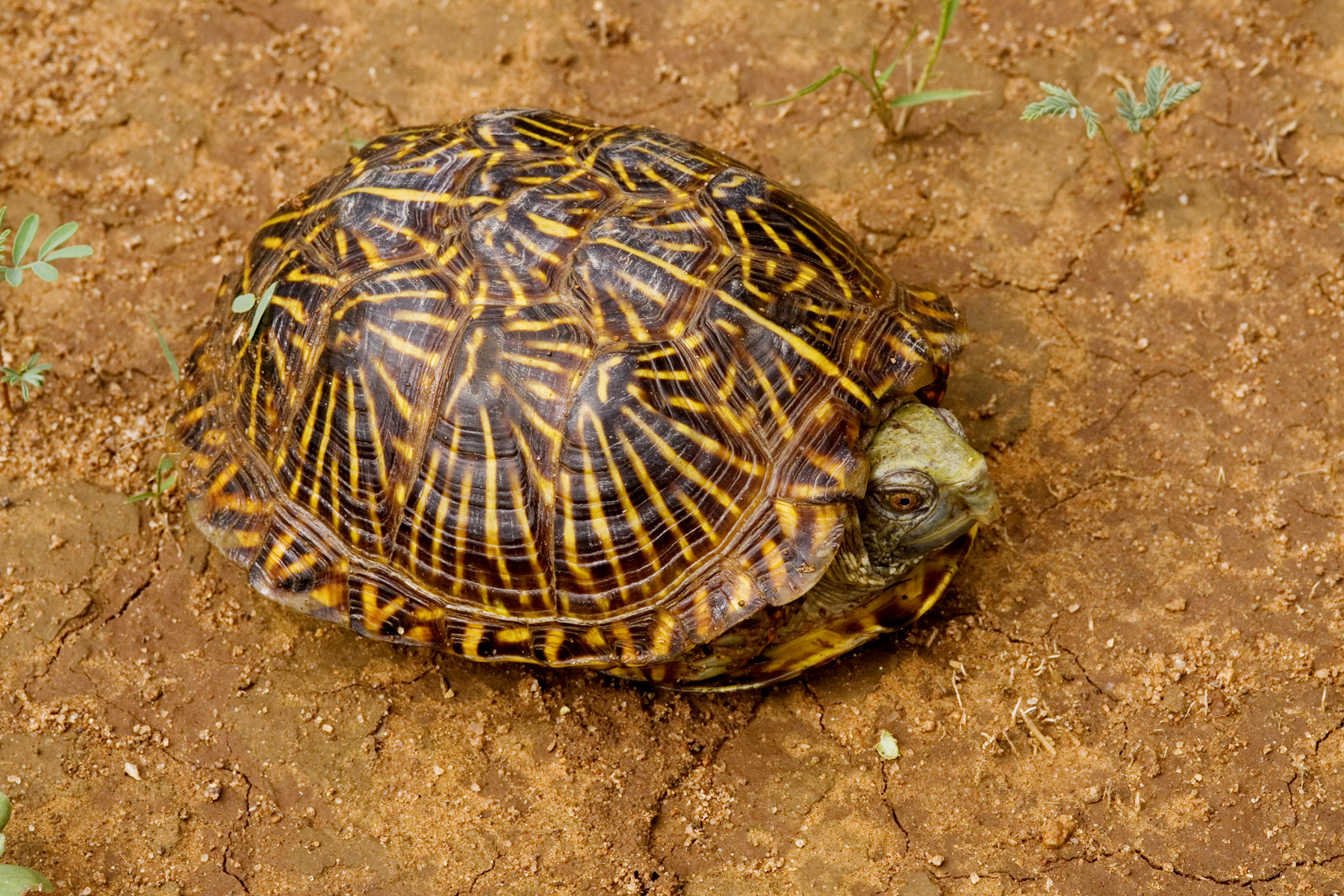
- In New Mexico

Scientific classification
- Kingdom: Animalia
- Phylum: Chordata
- Class: Reptilia
- Order: Testudines
- Suborder: Cryptodira
- Family: Emydidae
- Genus: Terrapene
- Species: T. ornata
- Subspecies: T. o. luteola

Trinomial name
- Terrapene ornata luteola H.M. Smith & Ramsey, 1952

Synonyms
- Terrapene ornata luteola H.M. Smith & Ramsey, 1952

= Desert box turtle =

Subspecies of turtle

The desert box turtle, also known as the Sonoran box turtle, (Terrapene ornata luteola) is a subspecies of box turtle which is endemic to the southwestern United States and northern Mexico. They live in habitats which have a more dry/arid climate and are able to survive without the prevalence of water in their environment, finding many different sources for hydration. They are generally terrestrial but occasionally take to the water and are most known for their boxy shell and its structural integrity. The turtles are known to grow at a fast pace until they are about 10 years old at which point it slows down and stays constant for the rest of their lifespan. Due to seasonal droughts, the growth and reproduction rate of desert box turtles may be different than those of other species located in more central locations in North America.

== Features ==
The most obvious morphological feature of box turtles is their bony boxy shell that consists of scutes covering the carapace. The scutes are used to enhance structural support and give the box turtles their sculpted appearance. In box turtles, the bones in their shell fuse together unlike in other turtles. Their ribs and vertebral column are fused with their bony shell.

The box turtle also has the ability to create a tight seal by closing the plastron upward to fit snugly against the carapace through a movable hinge between its pectoral and abdominal structures assuring the closure of the shell (Figure 1).

Other characteristics include a continuous middorsal yellow line on its carapace and the plastron is solid brown with yellow spots and has mottling on its head and legs. Although, some males can have an entirely green head. Their colors are muted for camouflage in the desert and mature turtles are lighter and more muted than the juvenile. Most, but not all male turtles have red irises. Male box turtles also include concave plastrons, thicker tails with the cloaca closer to the tip, and longer rear legs with larger curved claws which are used to grip the female shell during mating. They also have a similar internal anatomy to freshwater turtles except for the fact that they lack a degenerative cloacal bursae because they do not need to hibernate in water.

Most adults have about a 125–130 mm carapace length, in where the females were significantly longer than males. They are a species with a long lifespan, with some being able to live to about 50 years old in nature and perhaps even longer in captivity.

== Geographic range ==
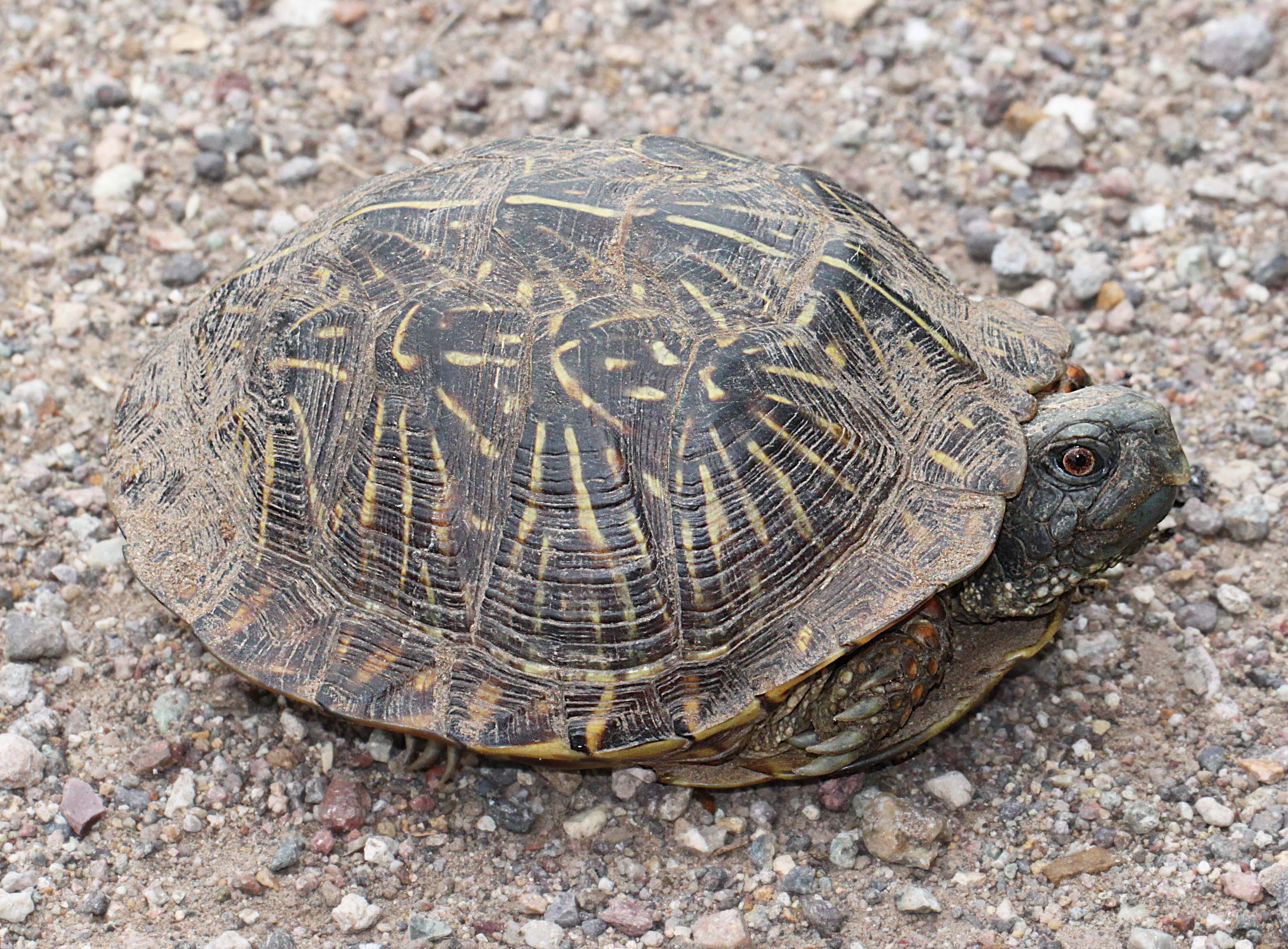
In Arizona

The desert box turtle is native to the arid regions of the southwestern United States and the states of Sonora and Chihuahua, Mexico, with their range predominantly straddling the Mexico-United States border.

The western extent of their distribution is likely Tucson, Arizona, and the Buenos Aires National Wildlife Refuge, in Pima County; they have been sighted as far north in the state as Apache Junction, as well as outside of Phoenix. Like most of the desert box turtle population, their numbers are highest, seemingly, along the Mexican border with the U.S.

In New Mexico, desert box turtles are known from as far north as Albuquerque and Roswell, and from such protected areas as the Bosque del Apache, San Andres and the Sevilleta National Wildlife Refuges. They are found commonly throughout most of the southern half of the state, extending their range into Chihuahua, Mexico (where they can be found as far south as Chihuahua City).

In Texas, desert box turtles are mostly found in the Trans-Pecos and Big Bend areas of West Texas (and within Big Bend National Park).

== Habitat ==
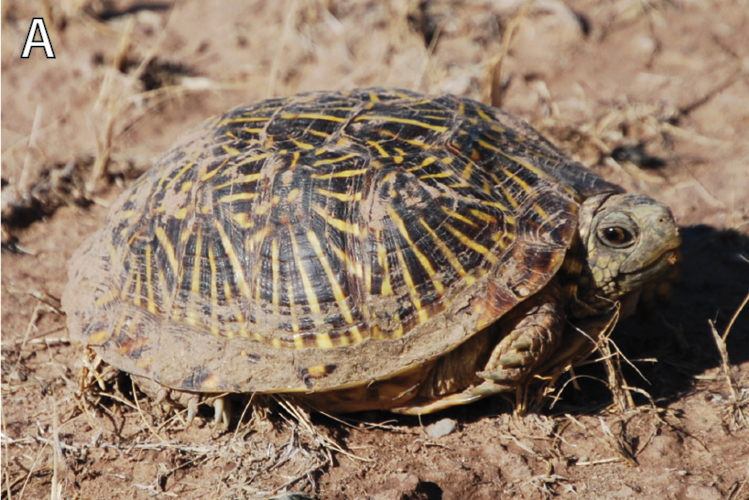
At the Sierra Vieja, Texas

The desert box turtle is endemic to the southwestern United States and northern Mexico. It lives in desert grasslands/shrublands and may face a drier, more severe environment compared with other box turtles in North America. They prefer arid, open prairie areas but have also been found in grassland regions where there is an abundance of yucca around. They prefer small defined areas where they can be well aware of their surroundings and the locations of their food, shelter and overwintering sites. Desert box turtles have relatively small home territories, and they exhibit strong site fidelity, seeming to show an affinity to the area of their hatching.

=== Breeding habitat ===
Desert box turtles usually prefer to breed during wetter spring seasons, as egg production is increased, rather than drier springtimes. Precipitation in the spring may subsequently increase the number of summer-laying females; in years with drier springs, female desert box turtles may delay laying eggs outright, rather than reducing annual output during a drought period. Due to the seasonality and unpredictable nature of rainfall in the desert southwest, it is likely that the desert box turtle's growth, maturation and reproductive behaviors are distinct from other box turtle species found elsewhere, such as in the central and eastern U.S., southern Mexico or into Central America.

== Hibernation ==
Desert box turtles hibernate in the winter and are naturally freeze tolerant. This is due to the fact that they are greatly affected by air temperature and the weather. As soon as November hits, hibernation begins and lasts until late May and early June. They usually hibernate at temperatures between 1 and 15 degrees, the desert box turtles have designated overwintering or hibernation sites that are closely within their home range. The desert box turtles burrow themselves into the ground for about 35 cm. They stay burrowed until the temperature increases and certain factors like warming of the ground temperature, precipitation and ground moisture are present. They attain a 5-month dormancy until they emerge and become active again.

== Reproduction ==
Their overall activity when it comes to mating or laying eggs is completely correlated to the air temperature and not the precipitation. Male desert box turtles are normally sexually mature by the time they are 8–9 years of age, but in captivity have been known to breed as young at the age 2. Females normally require 10–11 years to reach sexual maturity and their breeding season lasts between March and May, and nesting sites will be chosen from May to July. Males will be sexually active from the time they emerge from hibernation until September or October. Males often fight aggressively with other males over females when looking for a mate. The mean number of eggs in a clutch varied from 2.67 to 3.55, there was no indication of multiple clutches being produced, and variation in egg numbers was only weakly explained by the cloaca of the female. Clutch size was positively correlated with the maternal body size, but egg width was not related to the maternal body size but was related to the maternal mass. Pelvic width was significantly correlated with the egg width and maternal body size. Egg size varied very little while incubation lasted about seventy days.

== Behavior ==
Most of their activity generally is in the early morning a couple hours after sunrise and then again from the late afternoon till sunset. There is occasional movement during the day in most cases they retreat to shadier areas, places with vegetation for cover, or burrows during times of peak sunlight and temperature to regulate temperature and save energy. Their behavior and movement increase with the rise of air temperatures. In terms of seasonal changes in behavior their amount of activity peaks starting in the summer months and tapers off in early fall, with most activity in July and August.

== Diet ==
Desert box turtles are omnivores, with the majority of their diet being carnivorous, eating native vegetation that surrounds their habitat and also eating insects and smaller animals. Considering that they inhabit plain grasslands or mesquite grasslands, their diet consists of largely ground-living insects that include grasshoppers, beetles and caterpillars as well as millipedes. The one important element in their diet are dung beetles, and they are in exploitable quantities due to great numbers of herbivores in the population. As the population of dung beetles decreases, the number of box turtles decreases with it as well.They have also been found to eat carrion when available which gives them a nutritious meal while minimizing the energy expenditure on hunting or grazing on other food sources.

Desert box turtles have been spotted consuming cow patties when they are available. It has been hypothesized that they do this for sustenance and to collect any remaining moisture for hydration purposes when water may be less available. The first recorded account of this was published in the Herpetological Review scientific journal in 2018.

== Conservation ==
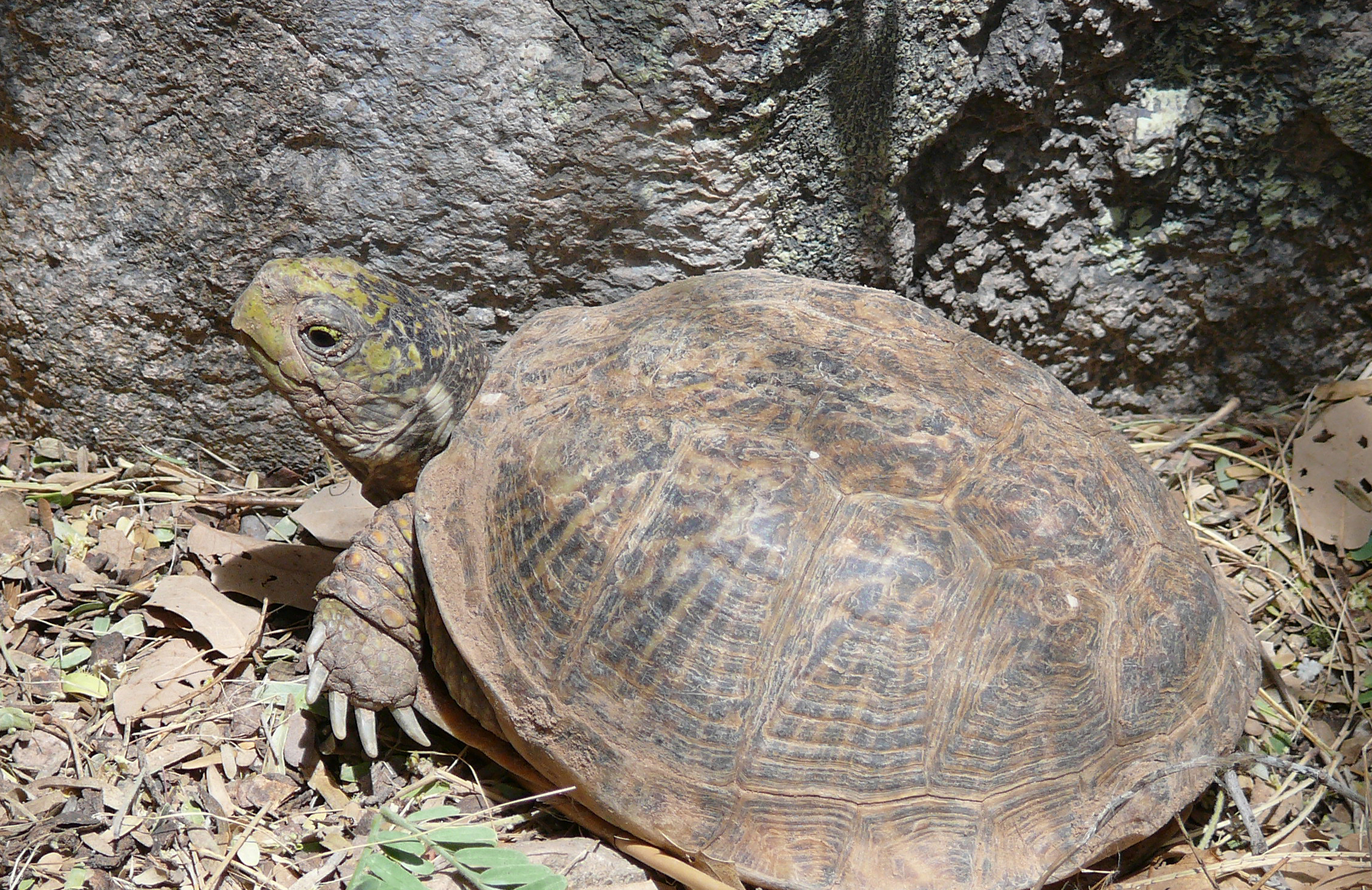
At the Arizona Sonoran Desert Museum

Box turtles in North America are increasingly becoming a conservation concern because of habitat loss and because they are being harvested for the pet trade. The destruction of prairies due to land renovations has led to the decline of the desert box turtles (Terrapene ornata luteola) across much of their geographical range. These sites showed high fidelity and were used for overwintering habitats. But efforts have been placed by land management organizations by considering the use of translocation programs in order to restore the desert box turtle's population to areas specifically reserved for them. But they are faced with the problem of long term post-translocation monitoring because they have to establish new home ranges that are unfamiliar to the box turtles. Plus, they are notorious for returning to their site of origin and have very small home ranges where they exhibit high fidelity and used it as overwintering sites.
