= Sceloporus merriami longipunctatus =

Scientific classification
- Domain: Eukaryota
- Kingdom: Animalia
- Phylum: Chordata
- Class: Reptilia
- Order: Squamata
- Suborder: Iguania
- Family: Phrynosomatidae
- Genus: Sceloporus
- Species: S. merriami
- Subspecies: S. m. longipunctatus

Trinomial name
- Sceloporus merriami longipunctatus Olson, 1973

Subspecies of lizard

Sceloporus merriami longipunctatus, commonly known as the Presidio canyon lizard, is a subspecies of the canyon lizard, and is endemic to southwestern Texas and northeastern Mexico. It is unknown if it interbreeds with the other subspecies of canyon lizard found in the same region, but it is likely.

== Etymology ==
The subspecific name, longipunctatus, is a combination of the Latin words longus meaning "long", punctum meaning "spot", and the suffix -atus meaning "pertaining to", which literally describes the laterally elongated paravertebral spots on the lizard's back which are a diagnostic of the subspecies.

== Geographic range ==
S. m. longipunctatus is native to a narrow range in the Big Bend region of the US state of Texas and into adjacent states in northern Mexico. The holotype was collected on May 31, 1971 by R. Earl Olson in Presidio County, Texas.

== Description ==
The Presidio canyon lizard is a medium-sized lizard, growing from 4.5 to 6.25 inches (11.5–16 cm) in total length. Its coloration varies with the soil color in its particular choice of habitat, varying from gray to brown, with two rows of dark, comma-shaped spots down each side of the back, and a dark line on the shoulder region. It has a fairly large head for its body size, and a dewlap which is larger in males than females. The underside has dark lines, especially under the neck and tail regions, and males have distinct blue patches on either side of the belly.

== Behavior ==
All canyon lizards are diurnal and insectivorous. Their primary choice of habitat is rocky, unvegetated canyon lands with numerous crevices to hide in, and ledges to bask on.

== Reproduction ==
They are oviparous.
