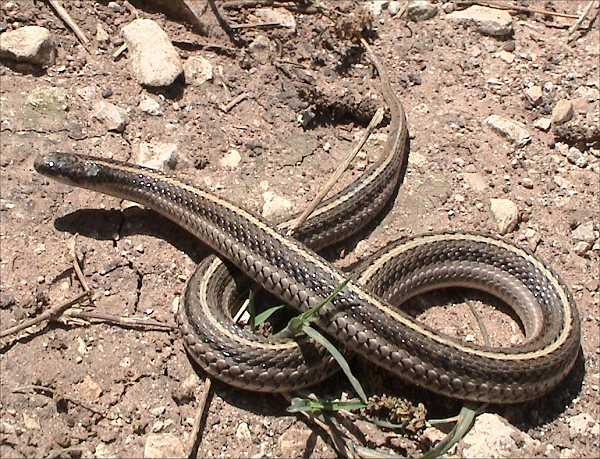
- Tropidoclonion lineatum texanum

Scientific classification
- Kingdom: Animalia
- Phylum: Chordata
- Class: Reptilia
- Order: Squamata
- Suborder: Serpentes
- Family: Colubridae
- Genus: Tropidoclonion
- Species: T. lineatum
- Subspecies: T. l. texanum

Trinomial name
- Tropidoclonion lineatum texanum Ramsey, 1953

= Texas lined snake =

Subspecies of snake

The Texas lined snake (Tropidoclonion lineatum texanum) is a subspecies of nonvenomous snake in the subfamily Natricinae of the family Colubridae. The subspecies is endemic to the United States.

== Geographic range ==
The Texas lined snake is found in the southcentral United States, primarily in the state of Texas.

== Habitat ==
T. l. texanum is a relatively common fossorial subspecies, and spends most of its time buried in leaf litter.

== Diet ==
The Texas lined snake preys upon earthworms.

== Description ==
T. l. texanum is typically olive green to dark brown in color, with a distinctive yellow or cream-colored stripe down the center of the back. It has a small head and small eyes. It differs from other subspecies of T. lineatum by having fewer subcaudals: 33 or fewer in females, 40 or fewer in males.
