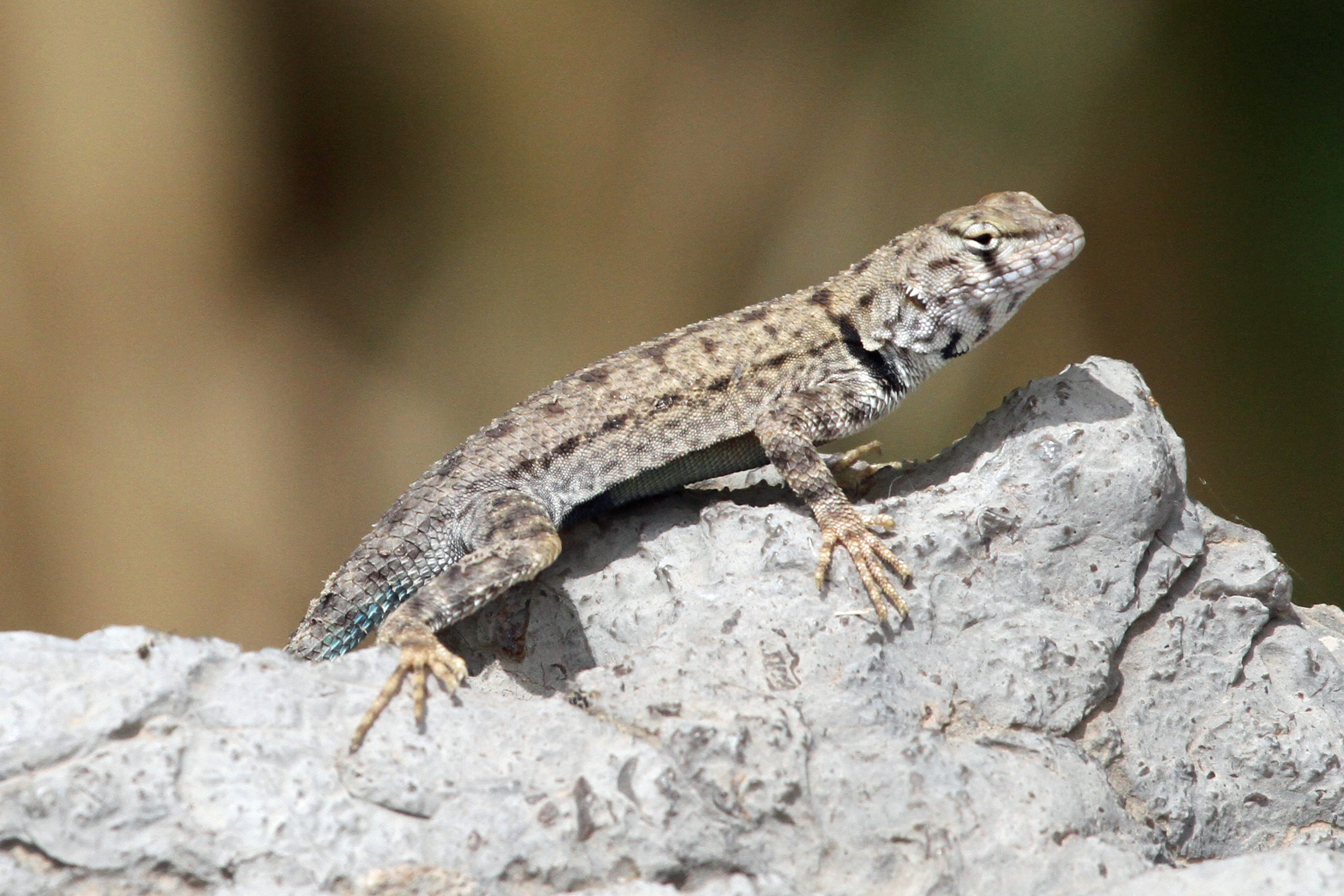

Scientific classification
- Kingdom: Animalia
- Phylum: Chordata
- Class: Reptilia
- Order: Squamata
- Suborder: Iguania
- Family: Phrynosomatidae
- Genus: Sceloporus
- Species: S. merriami
- Subspecies: S. m. annulatus

Trinomial name
- Sceloporus merriami annulatus H.M. Smith, 1937

= Sceloporus merriami annulatus =

Subspecies of lizard

Sceloporus merriami annulatus, commonly known as the Big Bend canyon lizard, is a subspecies of the canyon lizard, and is endemic to southwestern Texas and adjacent northeastern Mexico.

== Etymology ==
The subspecific name, annulatus, comes from the Latin noun annulus, meaning "ring", and refers to the banded subcaudal surface. This banding is one of the key characteristics to differentiate this subspecies from the nominotypical subspecies, Sceloporus merriami merriami.

== Geographic range ==
S. m. annulatus is native to a fairly narrow range from the Big Bend region of the US state of Texas, to eastern Coahuila in Mexico.

The holotype was collected by Edward Harrison Taylor and J.S. Wright in August 1931 in the Chisos Mountains of Brewster County, Texas.

== Description ==
The Big Bend canyon lizard is a medium-sized lizard, growing from 4.5 to 6.25 inches (11.5–16 cm) in total length. Its coloration varies with its choice of habitat, varying from grey to reddish, with two rows of dark spots down each side of the back and a dark line on the shoulder region. It has a fairly large head for its body size, and a dewlap which is larger in males than females. Males also have distinct blue patches on either side of the belly.

In this subspecies there are fewer than 53 dorsal scales from the interparietal scale to the base of the tail.

== Behavior ==
All canyon lizards are diurnal and insectivorous. Their primary choice of habitat is rocky, unvegetated canyon lands with numerous crevices to hide in, and ledges to bask on.

== Reproduction ==
They are oviparous.
