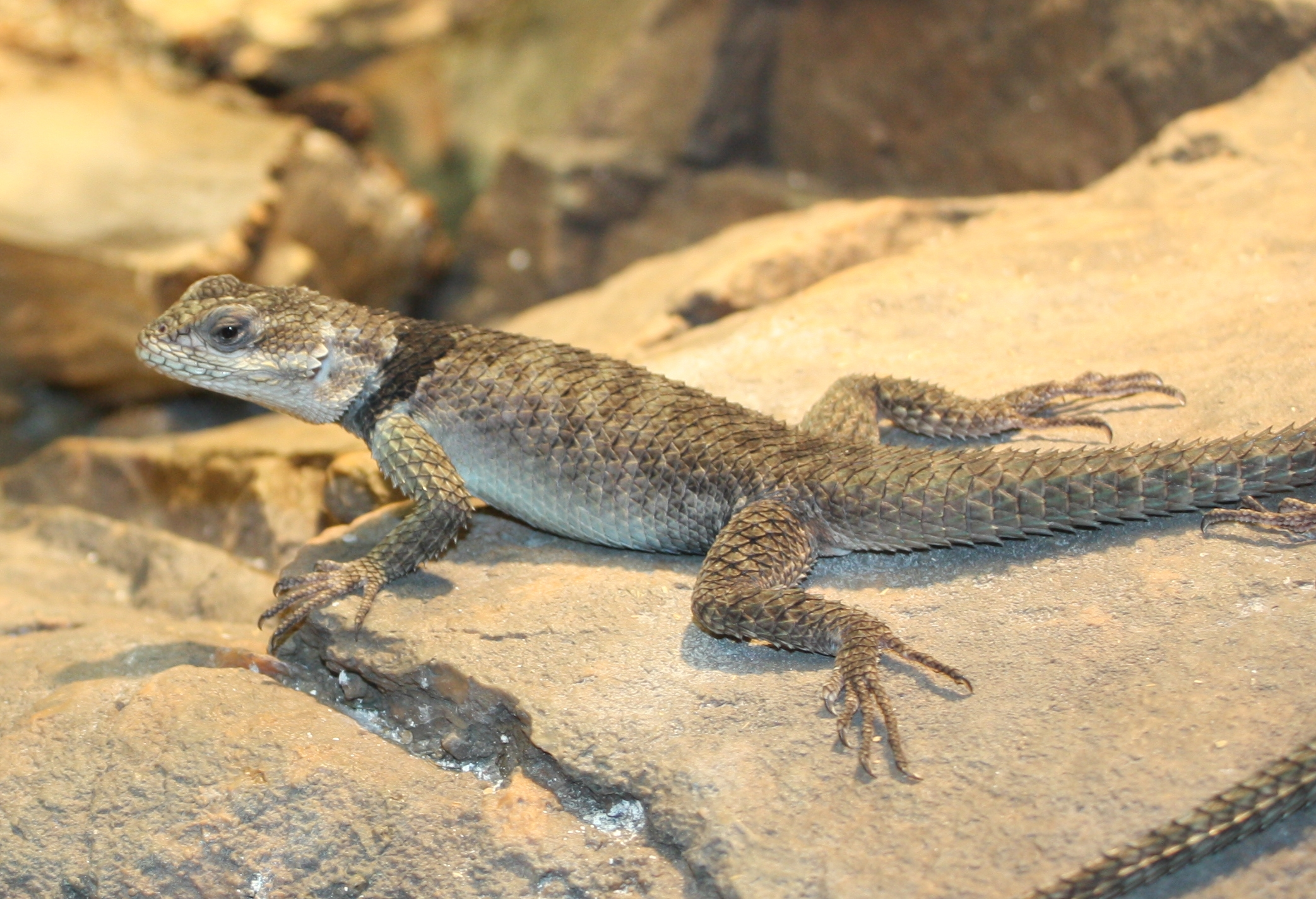

Scientific classification
- Domain: Eukaryota
- Kingdom: Animalia
- Phylum: Chordata
- Class: Reptilia
- Order: Squamata
- Suborder: Iguania
- Family: Phrynosomatidae
- Genus: Sceloporus
- Species: S. cyanogenys

Binomial name
- Sceloporus cyanogenys Cope, 1885

= Sceloporus cyanogenys =

Species of lizard

Sceloporus cyanogenys, the bluechinned roughscaled lizard or blue spiny lizard, is a species of lizard in the family Phrynosomatidae. It is found in Texas in the United States and Mexico.
