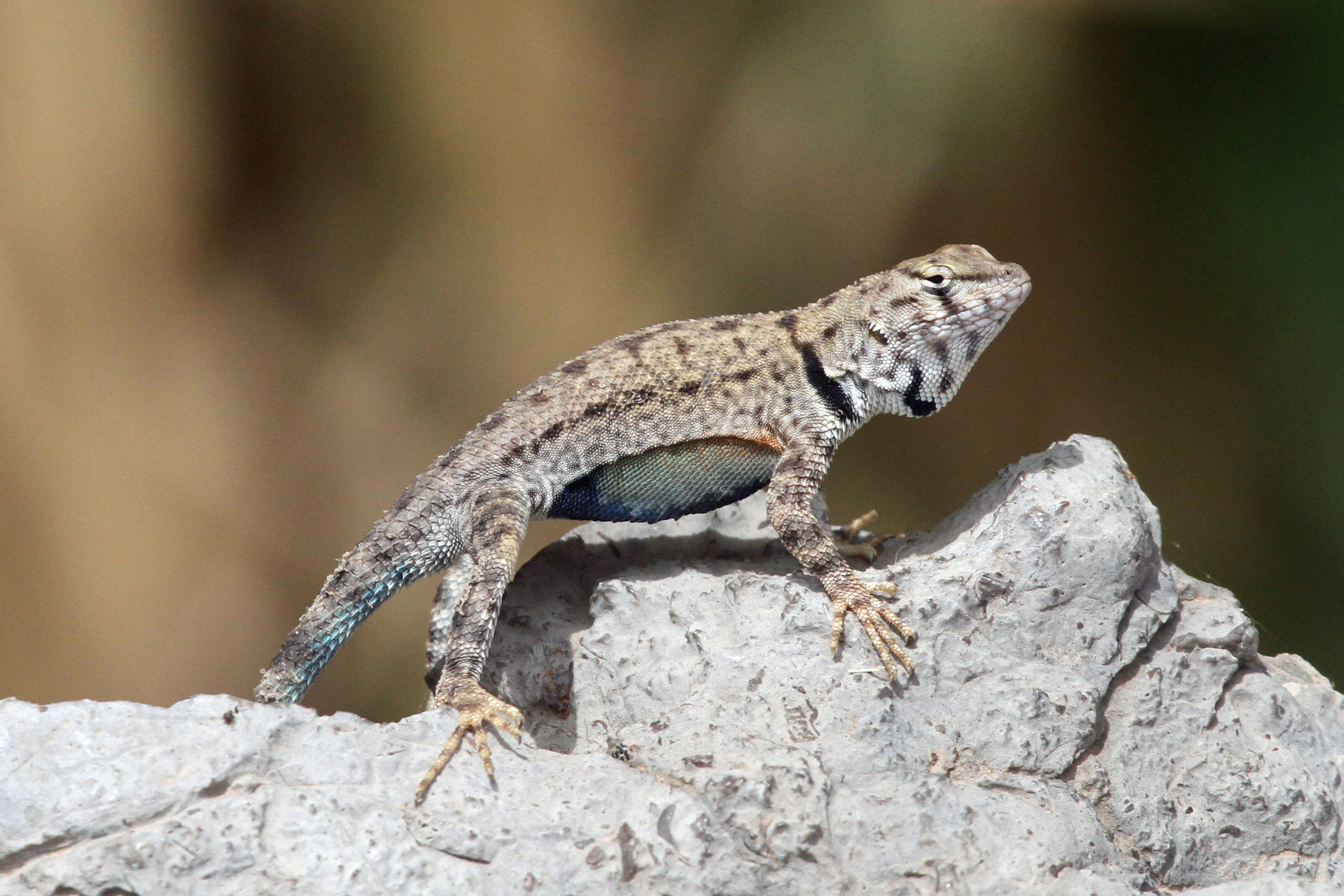
- A male Big Bend canyon lizard (Sceloporus merriami annulatus) near Big Bend National Park, Texas

Conservation status
- Least Concern (IUCN 3.1)

Scientific classification
- Kingdom: Animalia
- Phylum: Chordata
- Class: Reptilia
- Order: Squamata
- Suborder: Iguania
- Family: Phrynosomatidae
- Genus: Sceloporus
- Species: S. merriami

Binomial name
- Sceloporus merriami Stejneger, 1904

= Sceloporus merriami =

Canyon lizard

Species of lizard

Sceloporus merriami, commonly known as the canyon lizard, is a species of lizard in the family Phrynosomatidae. The species is native to the southwestern United States and adjacent northern Mexico.

== Etymology ==
The specific name, merriami, is in honor of American zoologist Clinton Hart Merriam.

== Geographic range ==
Sceloporus merriami is found in the United States in the state of Texas, and it is found in Mexico in the states of Chihuahua, Coahuila, Durango, and Nuevo León.

== Habitat ==
The preferred natural habitat of Sceloporus merriami is steep rocky areas of desert.

== Behavior ==
Sceloporus merriami lives on rock faces of canyon walls, and shelters in crevices.

== Description ==
Adults of Sceloporus merriami may reach 58 mm (2.2 in) snout-to-vent length (SVL). Including the tail, they may reach 162 mm (6.4 in) in total length. The dorsal scales are small, and the lateral scales are granular.

Dorsally, the canyon lizard is gray, tan, or reddish-brown, matching the rocks on which it lives. There are four rows of dark spots on the back, and a vertical black line in front of the front leg. Males have blue and black lines on the throat.

== Reproduction ==
Sceloporus merriami is oviparous. The eggs are buried in soil.

== Subspecies ==
Seven subspecies of Sceloporus merriami are recognized as being valid, including the nominotypical subspecies.

- Sceloporus merriami annulatus H.M. Smith, 1937 – Big Bend canyon lizard
- Sceloporus merriami australis K.L. Williams, H.M. Smith & Chrapliwy, 1960 – southeastern canyon lizard
- Sceloporus merriami ballingeri Lemos-Espinal, H.M. Smith, Auth & Chiszar, 2001 – Ballinger's canyon lizard
- Sceloporus merriami longipunctatus Olson, 1973 – Presidio canyon lizard
- Sceloporus merriami merriami Stejneger, 1904 – Merriam's canyon lizard
- Sceloporus merriami sanojae Lemos-Espinal & Chiszar, 2003 – Sanoja's canyon lizard
- Sceloporus merriami williamsi Lemos-Espinal, Chiszar & H.M. Smith, 2000 – Williams' canyon lizard
