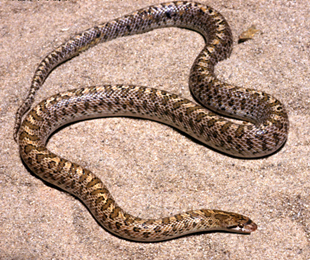
- Glossy snake (Arizona elegans)

Scientific classification
- Kingdom: Animalia
- Phylum: Chordata
- Class: Reptilia
- Order: Squamata
- Suborder: Serpentes
- Family: Colubridae
- Subfamily: Colubrinae
- Tribe: Lampropeltini
- Genus: Arizona; Kennicott, 1859

Species
- 2 recognized species, see article.

= Arizona (snake) =

Genus of snakes

Arizona is a genus of snakes in the family Colubridae. They are endemic to the United States and Mexico.

== Species ==
Image	Scientific name	Common name	Distribution
	Arizona elegans Kennicott, 1859	glossy snake, faded snake	southwestern United States and Mexico.
	Arizona pacata Klauber, 1946	peninsular glossy snake	Mexico (Baja California Sur)
