= Masticophis fuliginosus =

Scientific classification
- Kingdom: Animalia
- Phylum: Chordata
- Class: Reptilia
- Order: Squamata
- Suborder: Serpentes
- Family: Colubridae
- Genus: Masticophis
- Species: M. fuliginosus

Binomial name
- Masticophis fuliginosus (Cope, 1895)

Synonyms
- Coluber fuliginosus

Species of lizard

The Baja California coachwhip (Masticophis fuliginosus), also known simply as the Baja coachwhip, is a species of non-venomous snake found in Mexico and the United States.

== Description ==
A large and fast moving snake species, the Baja California coachwhip typically reaches lengths between 2-4.3 ft (24-52 in). This species comes in a few color morphs, some of which are region-specific. Throughout their entire range, individuals can have a sleek all-black coloration. Or they can be a dull yellow, with a black or brown head and neck area. In the more southern portions of their range, they may be light grayish-white with a black or brown head and neck. In all morphs, the underbellies are light yellow to white. In California, the black and the yellow morphs are observed. Along the Baja peninsula, any of morphs can be observed. All the morphs throughout their range may have various levels of mottling. The body plan is very similar to a closely related species, the coachwhip (Masticophis flagellum). They share large forward facing eyes (which allows great vision and depth perception), slender proportions, and a long tapering tail. Both have large scales above the eyes and a braided appearance of the scales at the tail. This unique appearance of the tail looks similar to a braided horsewhip, from which both species derive their name.

== Range and habitat ==
The Baja California coachwhip's range spans from the southernmost portions of San Diego County to throughout the Baja California peninsula, ending around Cabo San Lucas. They are also found in various islands in the Gulf of California as well as the Pacific side of the Baja California peninsula. Inhabiting elevations between 0-8250 ft (0-2515 m), they range across a variety of open habitats. These include coastal sand dunes, inland grassland, scrubland, riparian environments, and agricultural areas. In the uppermost region of their range around California, they co-exist and potentially intergrade with the coachwhip (Masticophis flagellum). Along their range, the Baja California Coachwhip may also share ranges with other members of their genus. These include California whipsnakes (Masticophis lateralis), Baja California Striped whipsnakes (Masticophis aurigulus), and Espiritu Santo Striped Whipsnakes (Masticophis barbouri).

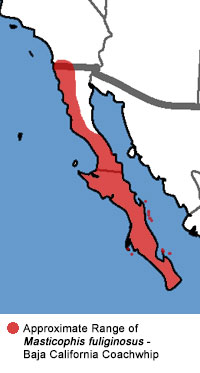
Approximate range of Baja California coachwhip. @ Gary Nafis.

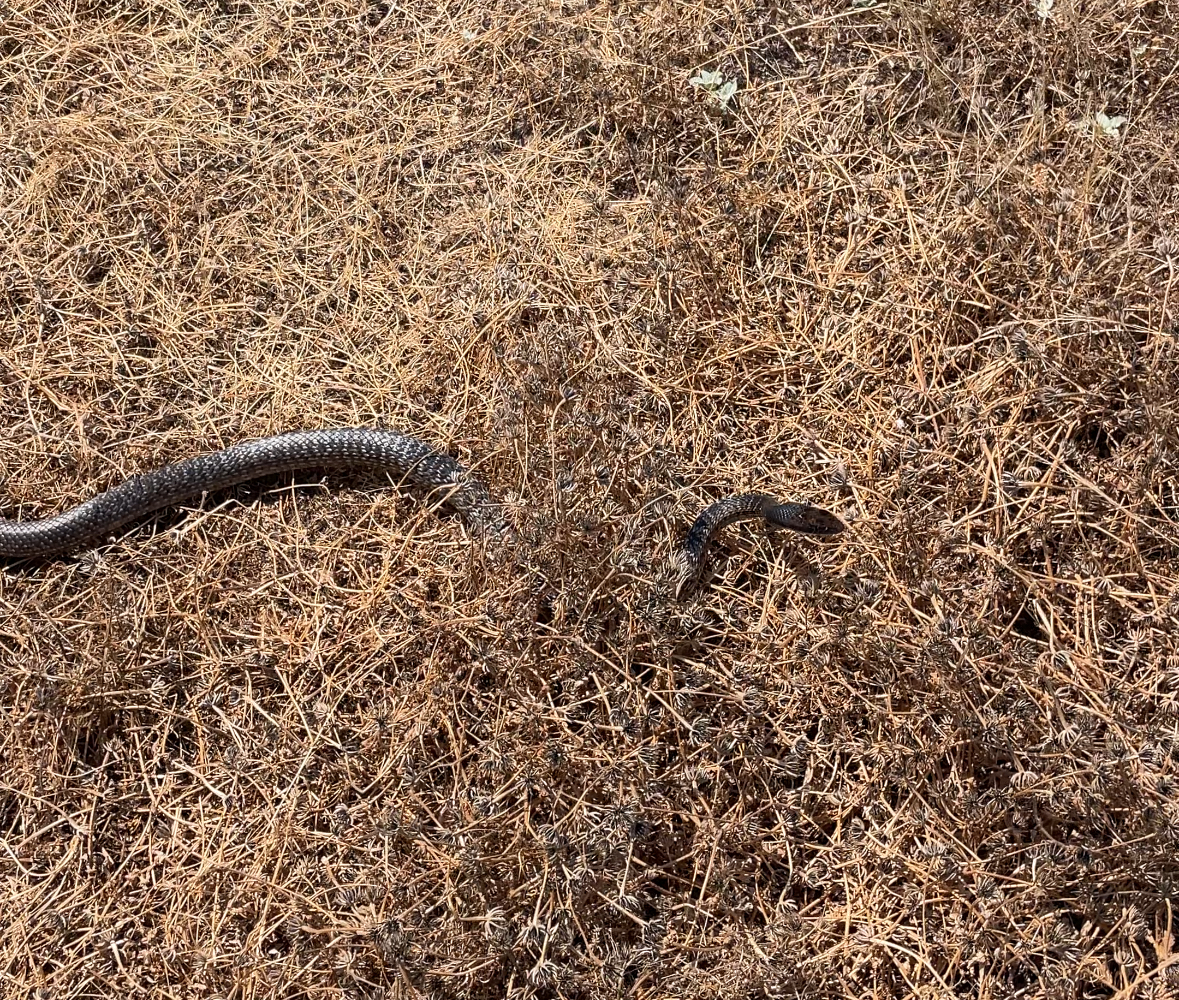
M. fuliginosus in grassland habitat, California.

== Behavior ==
The Baja California coachwhip is diurnal, active during daylight hours. They thrive in warm environments and can be seen slithering around conspicuously, sometimes in temperatures over 100 °F. Unlike most snakes, Baja California coachwhips are primarily pursuit predators, chasing prey down. They can be seen actively searching around, often spotting prey with their excellent vision. They look into burrows, out in the open, and into trees for any potential prey items. Sometimes, they are seen raising their heads high above the ground and looking around, a behavior known as "periscoping". Upon detecting prey, the Baja California coachwhip give chase, slithering quickly towards the prey. Then they bite onto the prey item upon getting close enough. Being non-venomous and non-constricting, they simply grab and swallow prey alive. However, their strong bite and ability to overlay coils on top of prey can help subdue via crushing and/or suffocation. They are solitary, and do not seek out conspecifics until mating season. This mating season, which occurs around the months of April and May, also happens to be the months when they are most active. They'll roam around during the day, searching for a partner to breed with.

They can be quite defensive towards predators, biting if caught. Their first line of defense however is to use their great speed to escape predators. They move extremely quickly, escaping up into trees, burrows, shrubs, etc.

Though primarily terrestrial, they are good climbers and swimmers. These snakes can be seen climbing into trees and other plants, as well as swimming across bodies of water. For sleeping and refuge, they may go into burrows, into tree stumps and plants, or other types of cover. Sometimes, they can be found climbing man-made structures, such as fences.

Like most living reptiles, Baja California coachwhips are ectotherms and cannot regulate their body temperature on their own. Thus, they bask on rocks, roads, open ground, or under surface cover in order to warm up. During cooler weather, they will seek shelter to keep an optimal body temperature.

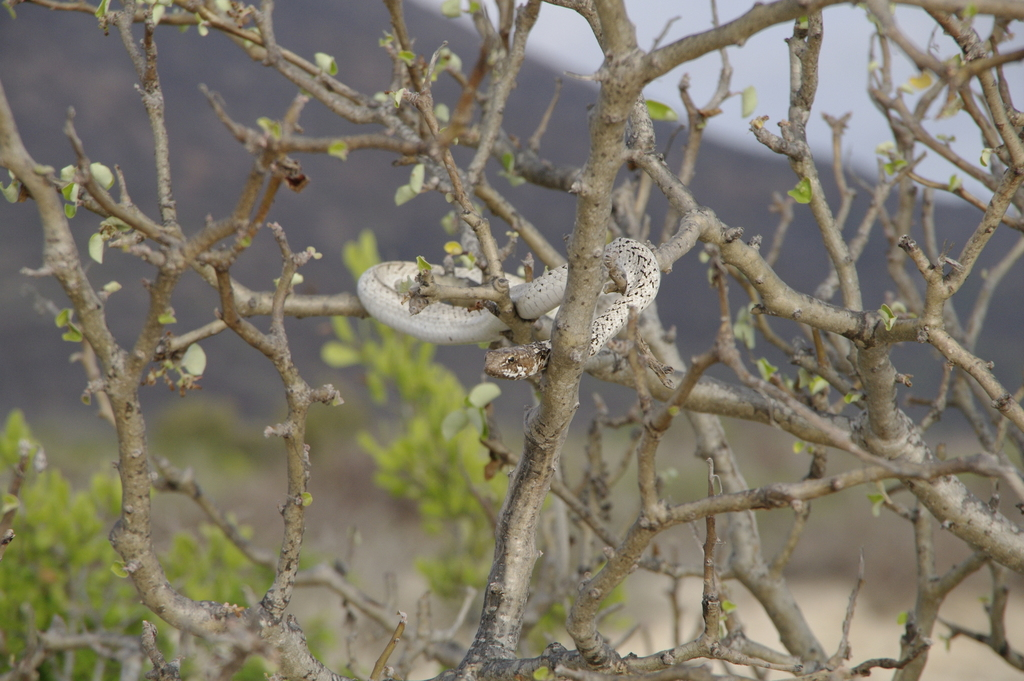
Climbing up a tree in Baja California Sur.

== Diet ==
As generalist predators, their diet includes a variety of animals. They typically eat rodents, lizards, and birds. Baja California coachwhips have been known to prey on other snakes, such as rattlesnakes.

== Reproduction ==
Reproduction occurs in the spring. In the northern Baja California, mating has been observed around late April. Females are oviparous, and lay eggs. Eggs have been observed in the summer, in early August.
