= Baja California striped whip snake =

There are two species of snake named Baja California striped whip snake:

- Masticophis aurigulus
- Masticophis barbouri
