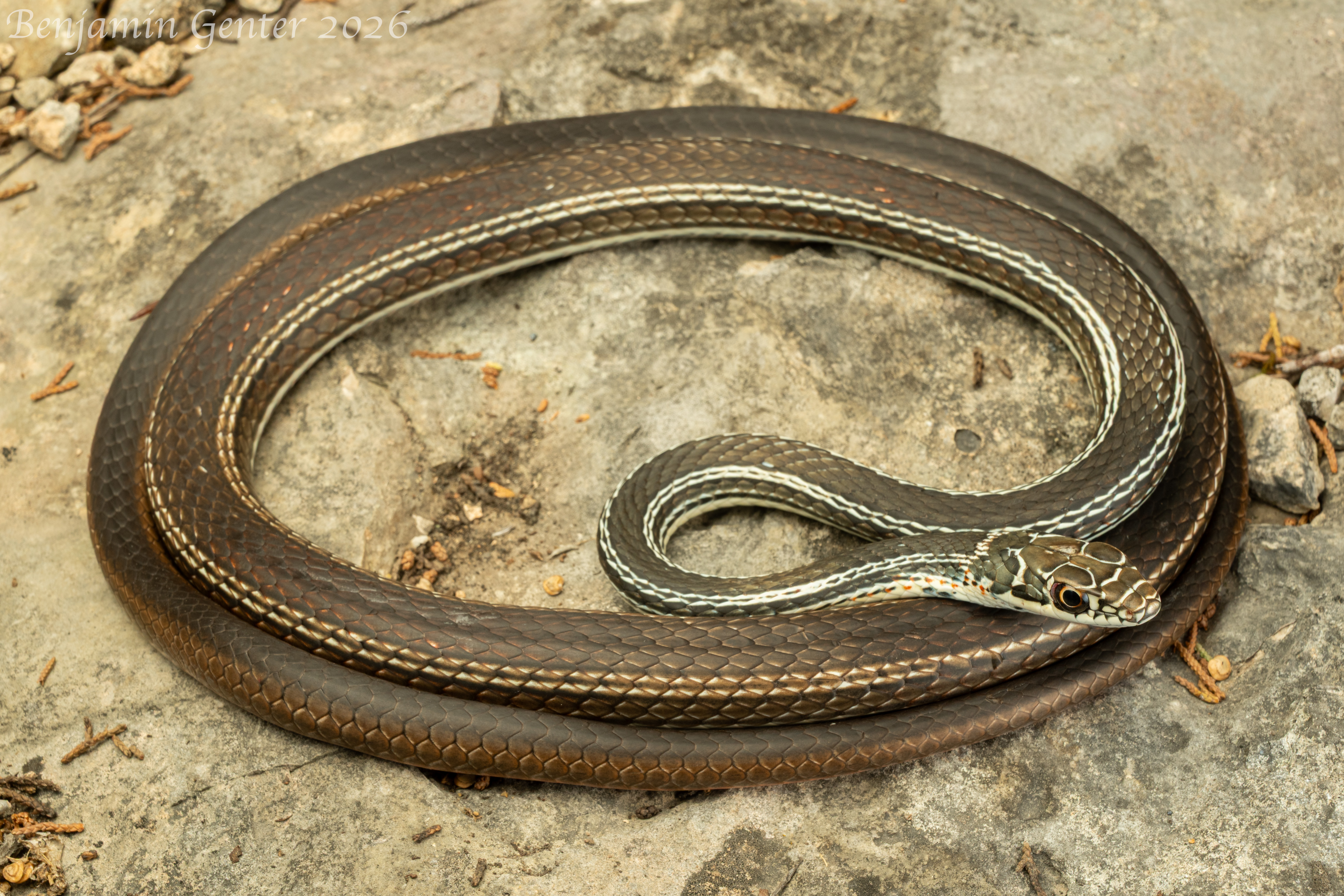

Conservation status
- Least Concern (IUCN 3.1)

Scientific classification
- Kingdom: Animalia
- Phylum: Chordata
- Class: Reptilia
- Order: Squamata
- Suborder: Serpentes
- Family: Colubridae
- Genus: Masticophis
- Species: M. taeniatus

Binomial name
- Masticophis taeniatus (Hallowell, 1852)

Subspecies
- Two, see text.
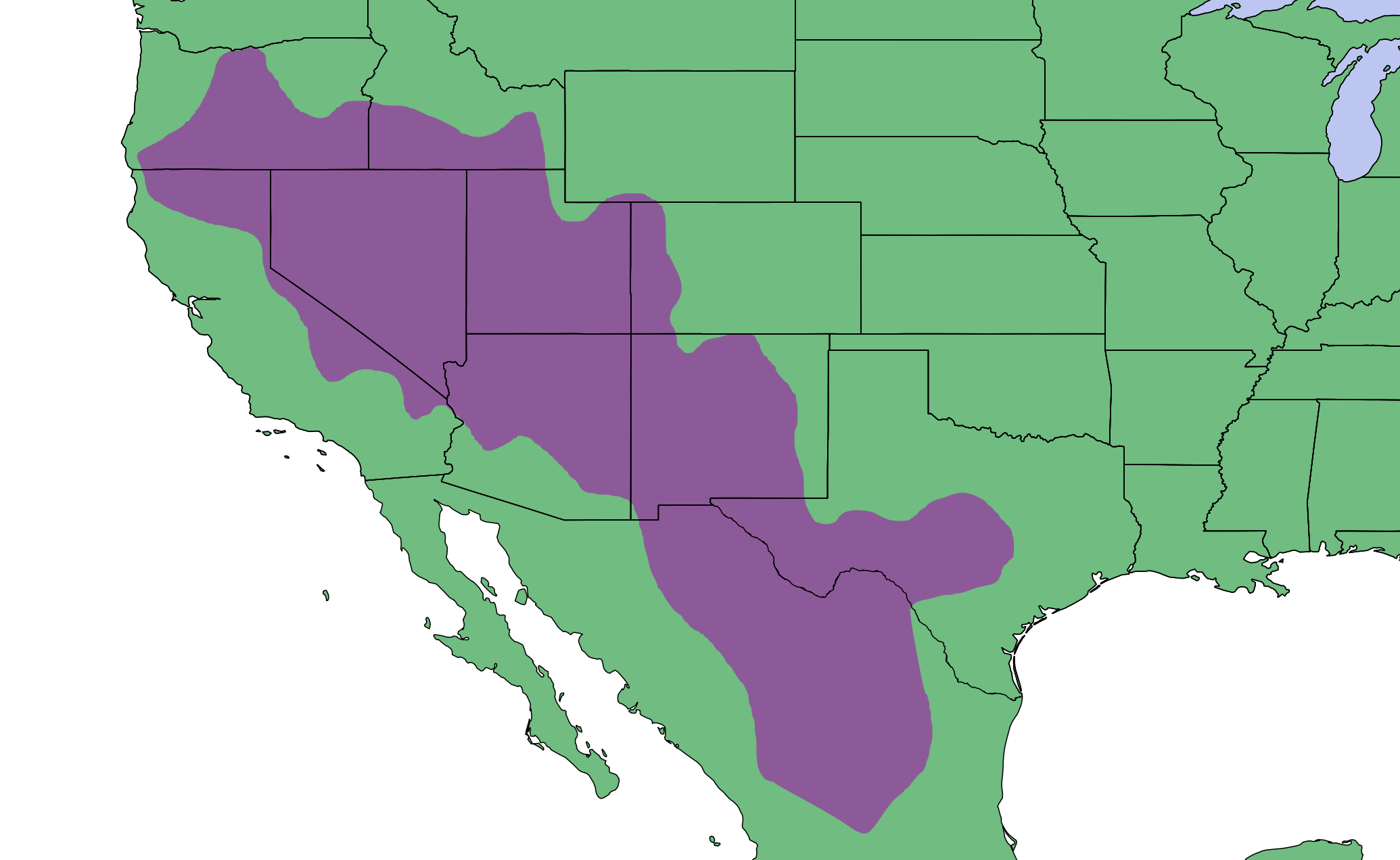

Synonyms
- Leptophis taeniata Hallowell, 1852; Masticophis taeniatus — Baird & Girard, 1853; Coluber taeniatus — Garman, 1883; Zamenis taeniatus — Cope, 1900; Masticophis taeniatus — Stebbins, 1985

= Striped whipsnake =

Species of snake

The striped whipsnake (Masticophis taeniatus) is a species of nonvenomous snake in the subfamily Colubrinae of the family Colubridae. The species is closely related to the California whipsnake (Masticophis lateralis). The striped whipsnake is native to the western United States and adjacent northern Mexico.

== Identification ==
The striped whipsnake is approximately 30–72 inches (76–183 cm) in total length (including tail). This snake exhibits black, dark brown, or gray coloration on its back, often with an olive or bluish tint. Along the center of each of the first four rows of pale dorsal scales, is a dark longitudinal stripe. There is a white to cream-colored stripe down its side that is bisected by either a solid or dashed black line. The coloring on the snake's belly tends to be cream to yellowish, fading to white toward the head, and coral pink toward the tail. This snake also features a lower preocular between the upper labial scales of the mouth. The anal scale is divided.

== Geographic range ==
The striped whipsnake is found throughout the western United States and northern Mexico. The northernmost part of its geographic range is in south central Washington, and continues southward into the Great Basin between the Cascade-Sierran crest and the continental divide. Its range then continues southeast across the continental divide into New Mexico and western and central Texas. The southernmost part of its range lies in Michoacán, Mexico. In the Western United States its range also extends outside of the Great Basin into the Rogue River Valley in southwestern Oregon and northern California. There is a population in Bryce Canyon National Park in Utah.

== Habitat ==
The striped whipsnake is commonly found in a wide variety of habitats including shrublands, grasslands, sagebrush flats, canyons, piñon-juniper woodlands, and open pine-oak forests. It is attracted to both permanent and seasonal rocky streams, and it frequents both flatlands and mountains.

== Behavior ==
The species Masticophis taeniatus is diurnal, active during the day, and is very alert and fast moving. It seeks shelter in rock outcrops, small mammal burrows, as well as in trees and shrubs depending on the habitat it occupies. This snake is nonvenomous, but it preys on a wide variety of species including lizards, other snakes (including venomous rattlesnakes), small mammals, young birds, frogs, and insects.

== Reproduction ==
The striped whipsnake is oviparous. Little is known about the reproductive activities of Masticophis taeniatus. After fertilization the female striped whipsnake will lay a clutch of 3–12 eggs, between the months of June and July, usually in an abandoned rodent burrow. One study has shown a natural incubation period of 44 to 58 days.

== Subspecies ==
There are two subspecies of Masticophis taeniatus which are recognized as being valid, including the nominotypical subspecies.

- Masticophis taeniatus girardi (Stejneger & Barbour, 1917)
- Masticophis taeniatus taeniatus (Hallowell, 1852)

Nota bene: A trinomial authority in parentheses indicates that the subspecies was originally described in a genus other than Masticophis.

== Etymology ==
The subspecific name, girardi, is in honor of French-American herpetologist Charles Frédéric Girard.
