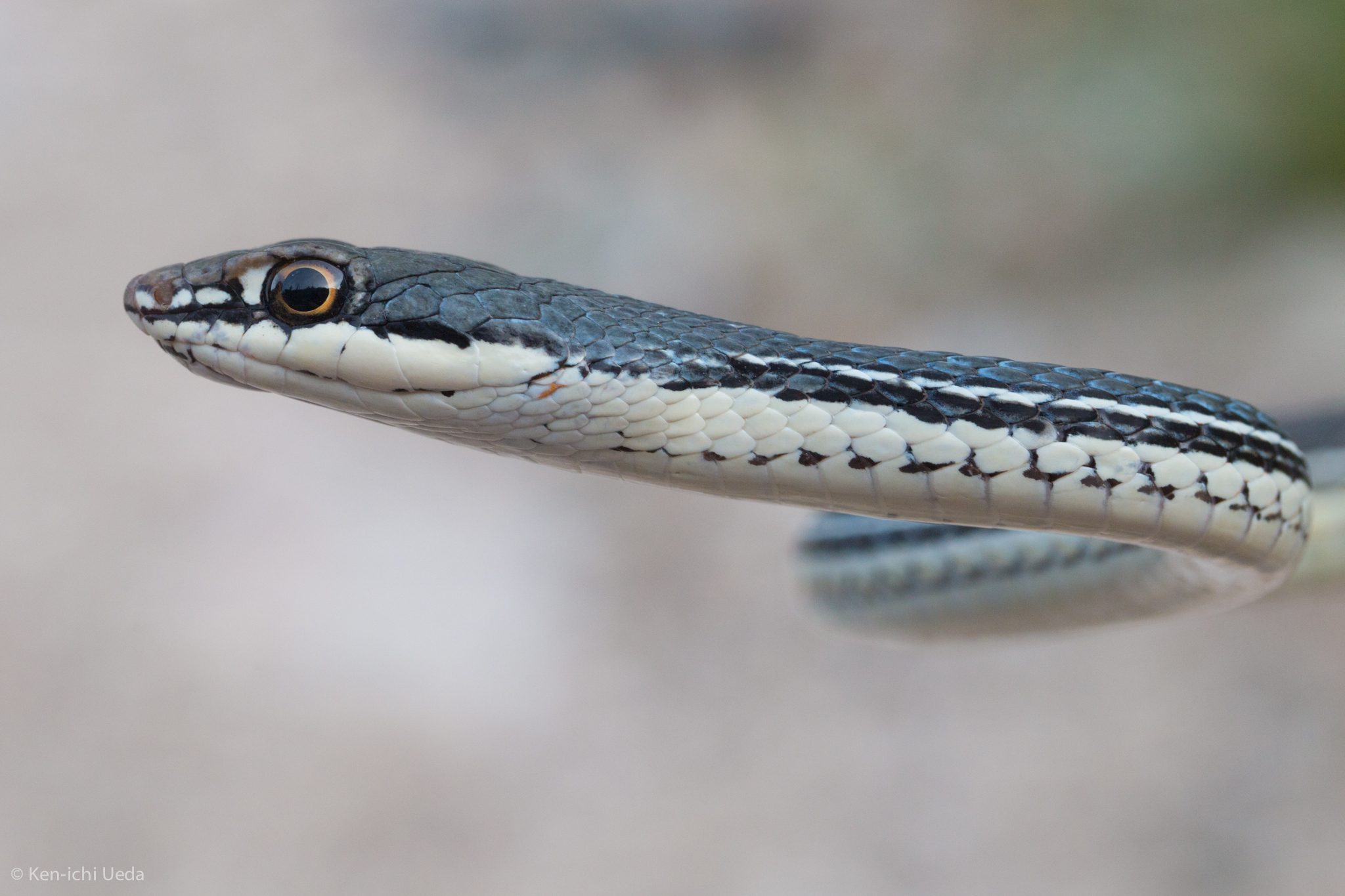

Conservation status
- Least Concern (IUCN 3.1)

Scientific classification
- Kingdom: Animalia
- Phylum: Chordata
- Class: Reptilia
- Order: Squamata
- Suborder: Serpentes
- Family: Colubridae
- Genus: Masticophis
- Species: M. bilineatus

Binomial name
- Masticophis bilineatus Jan, 1863
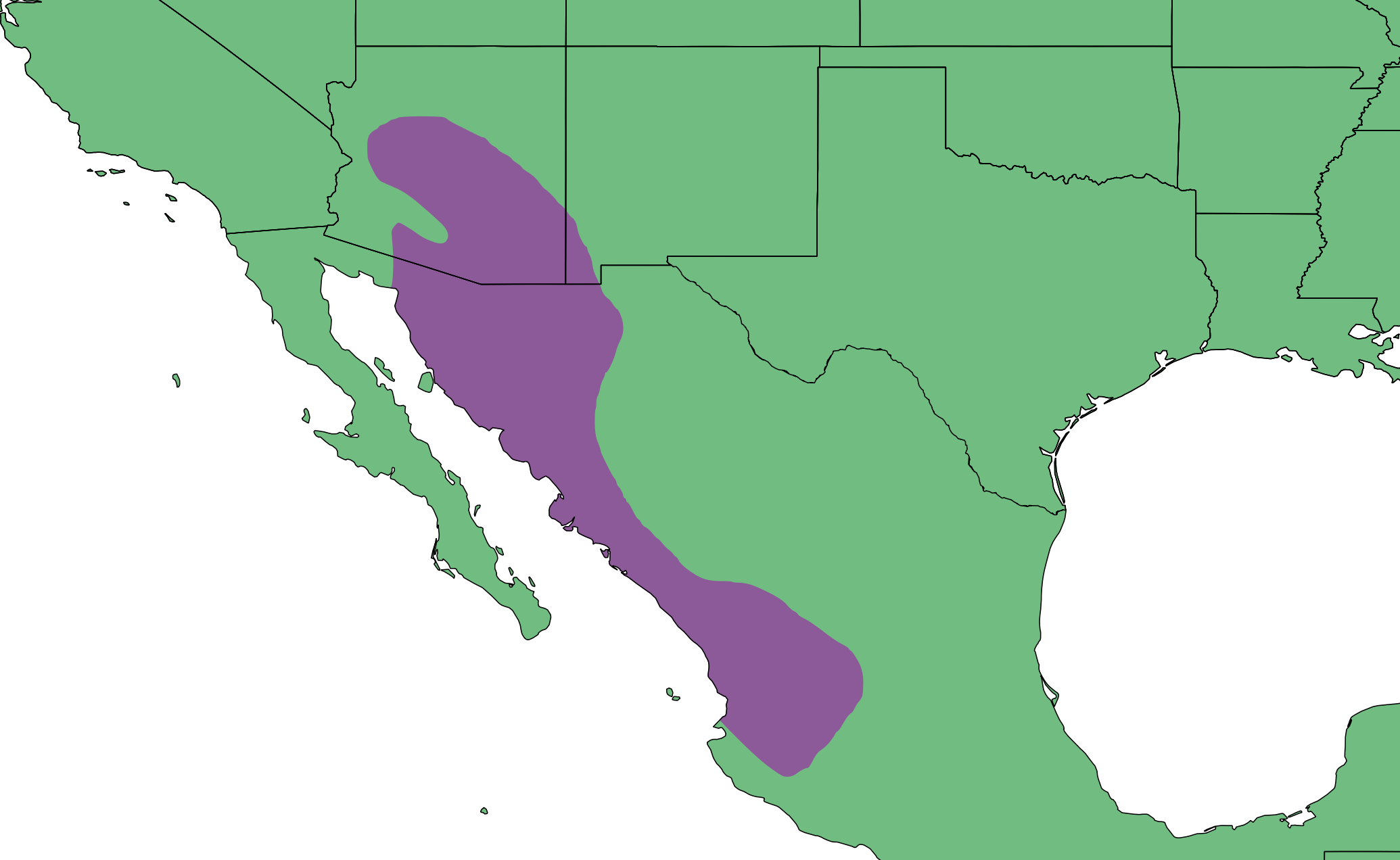

= Masticophis bilineatus =

Species of lizard

Masticophis bilineatus, the Sonoran whip snake, is a species of snake found in the United States and Mexico.

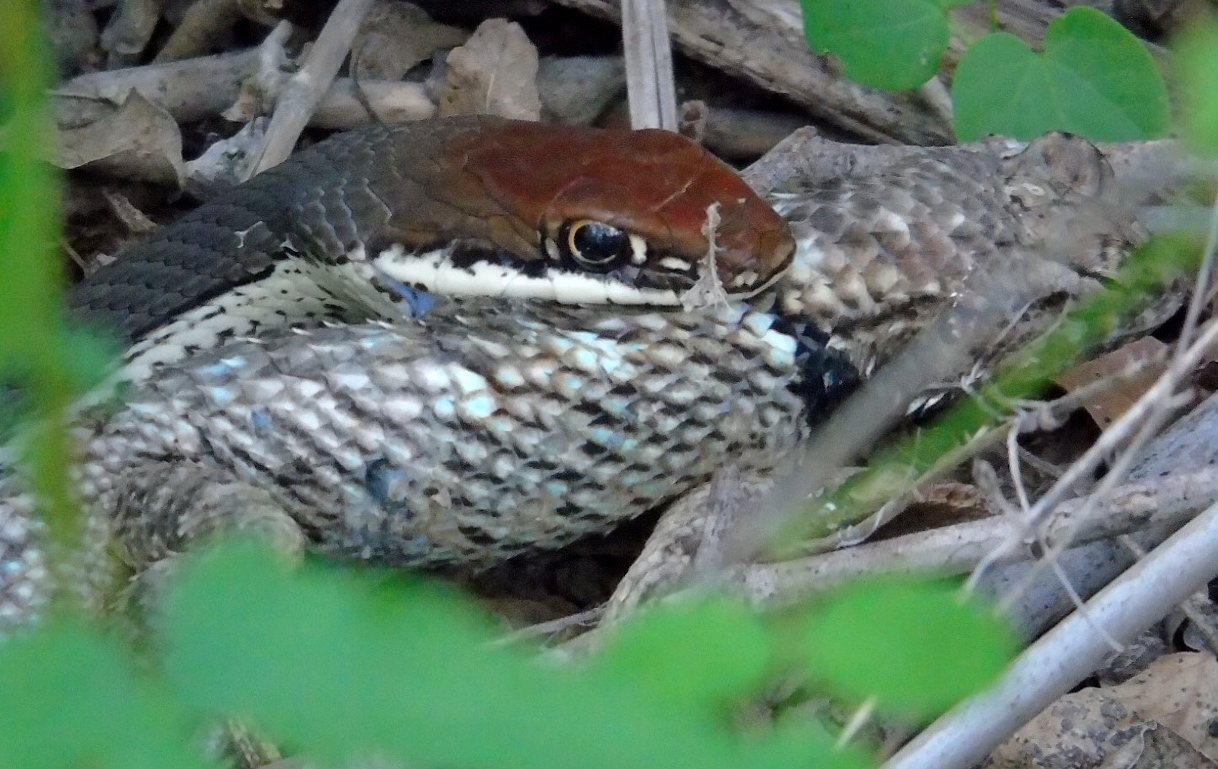
Feeding on Clark's spiny lizard
