= Masticophis slevini =

Conservation status
- Least Concern (IUCN 3.1)

Scientific classification
- Kingdom: Animalia
- Phylum: Chordata
- Class: Reptilia
- Order: Squamata
- Suborder: Serpentes
- Family: Colubridae
- Genus: Masticophis
- Species: M. slevini

Binomial name
- Masticophis slevini (Lowe & Norris, 1955)

Species of lizard

Masticophis slevini, the Isla San Esteban whip snake, is a species of snake found on San Esteban Island in Mexico.
