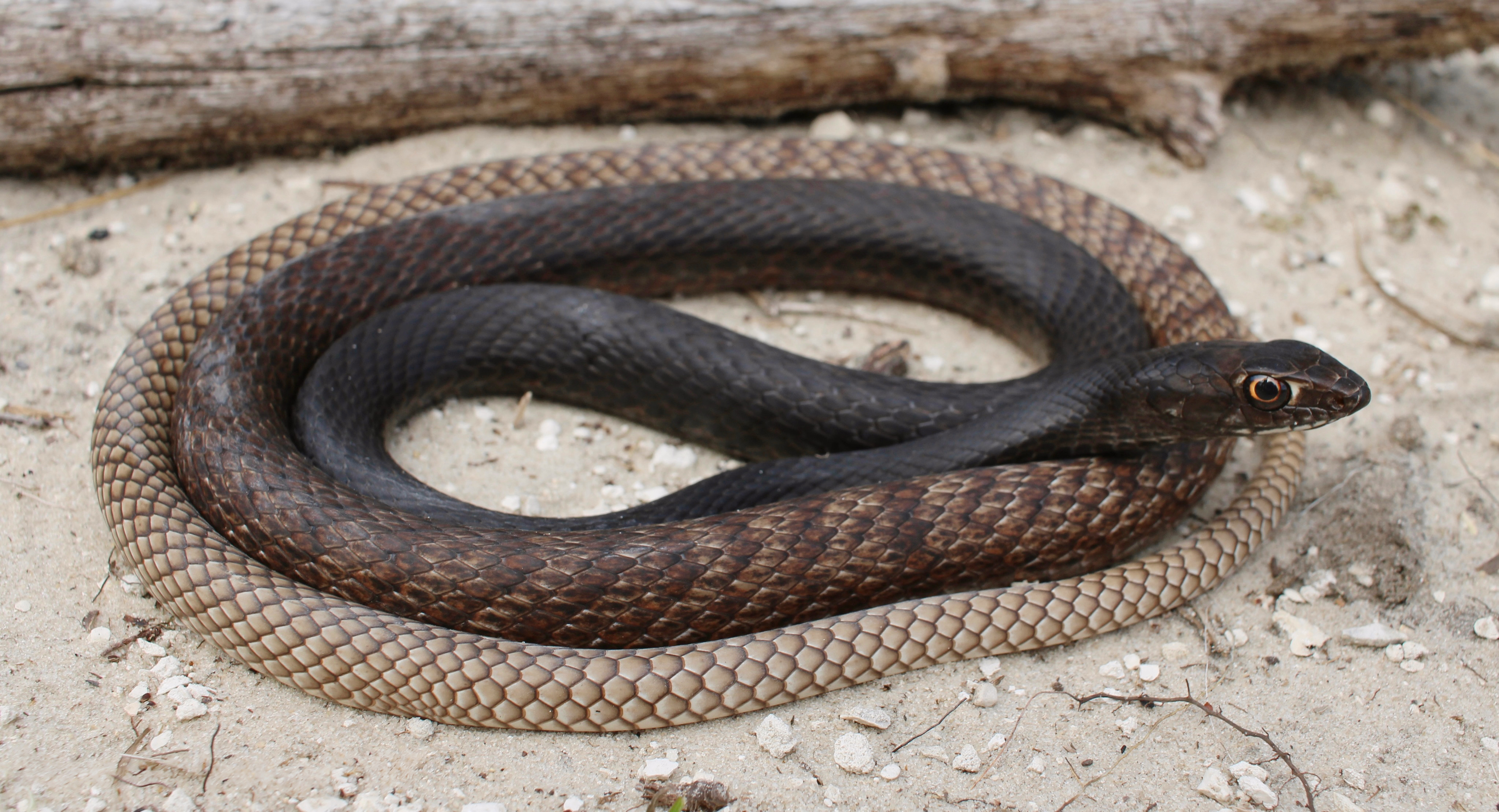

Scientific classification
- Kingdom: Animalia
- Phylum: Chordata
- Class: Reptilia
- Order: Squamata
- Suborder: Serpentes
- Family: Colubridae
- Genus: Masticophis
- Species: M. flagellum
- Subspecies: M. f. flagellum

Trinomial name
- Masticophis flagellum flagellum Shaw, 1802

Synonyms
- Coluber flagellum Shaw, 1802; Psammophis flavigularis Hallowell, 1852; Herpetodryas flagelliformis A.M.C. Duméril & Bibron, 1854; Bascanium flagelliforme — Cope, 1875; Zamenis flagelliformis — Boulenger, 1893; Coluber flagellum flagellum — Allen, 1932; Masticophis flagellum flagellum — Conant, 1975

= Masticophis flagellum flagellum =

Subspecies of snake

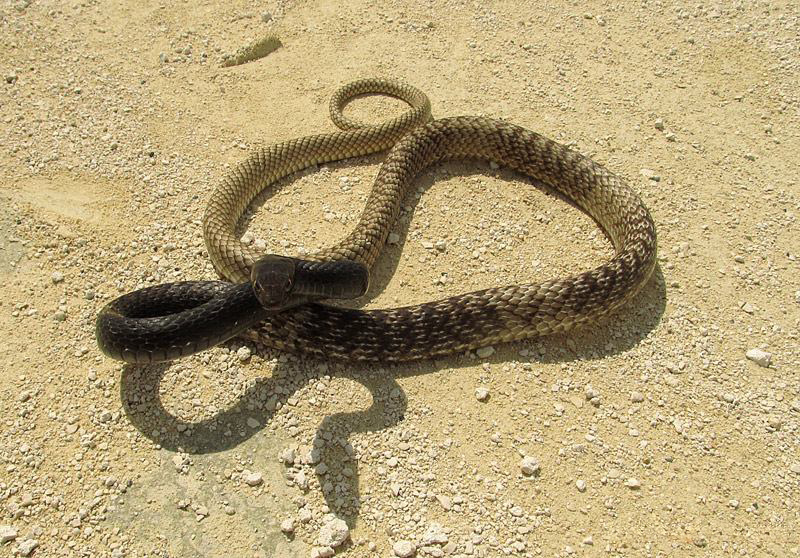
Adult in Florida

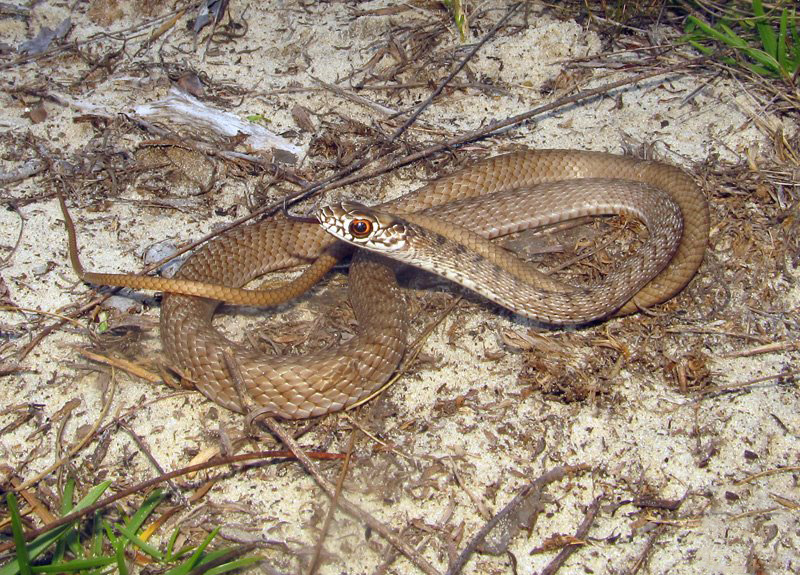
Sub-adult in Florida

Masticophis flagellum flagellum, commonly known as the eastern coachwhip, is a subspecies of M. flagellum, a nonvenomous, colubrid snake, endemic to the southern United States.

== Distribution ==
The subspecies ranges from North Carolina to Florida in the east, and from eastern Kansas to eastern Texas in the west. They are notably absent from the Mississippi Delta, which divides their range into two separate groupings. Within their distribution, they are consistently associated with open, sandy upland habitats such as pine savannas.

== Description ==
Adults are long and slender, ranging from 50 to 72 inches (130–180 cm) in total length. The longest on record was 102 inches (260 cm). They are among North America's largest native snakes. The head and neck are usually black, fading to tan posteriorly. Some specimens may lack the dark head and neck pigmentation. Their smooth scales and coloration give the appearance of a braided whip, hence the common name. Eastern coachwhips have diurnal foraging specialization and are most active during the day.

== Habitat ==
The subspecies can be found in a wide variety of habitats, but is most abundant in the southeastern coastal plain. Its preferred habitat includes sandy pine woodlands, pine-palmetto flatwoods, cedar glades, and along creeks, marshes and swamplands. M. flagellum adults and juveniles can be found in suburban neighborhoods where development encroaches on favorable habitats. A study done in southwestern Georgia found that the average home-range for the coachwhip is around 102.9 ± 28 ha. As they are open canopy specialists, coachwhips are good at returning to habitats soon after fires.

== Behavior and diet ==
The eastern coachwhip is an active, fast-moving snake. It is diurnal and hunts it prey by smell and sight. It frequently hunts with its head raised above the ground and vegetation, and unlike most snakes, visually locks onto its prey's position before capture. Eastern coachwhips do not constrict their prey. Following capture, the snake swallows its prey alive. It has strong jaws with rows of small, inward slanting teeth. It has sometimes been observed to beat its prey against the ground in an apparent effort to stun it prior to swallowing. Prey items include birds, large insects, lizards, other snakes, and small mammals. This snake has also been observed feeding on carrion.

== Reproduction ==
The breeding season spans from June through August, in which females produce one clutch of 4 to 24 eggs with an average of 11. Males reach sexual maturity at age 1 whereas females do not attain sexual maturity until age 3. Courtship behavior from males instigates copulation with a female, which can last up to 130 min. Mating system is polyandrous, meaning that although females will only produce one clutch of eggs, they will mate with multiple males over the breeding period. Males have been observed displaying territorial behavior in an attempt to prevent any further copulation from other males. The gestation period is around 77.5 days after which the female lays the eggs in a small animals burrow, no parental care is shown.

== Myth ==
A common myth is that the eastern coachwhip will intentionally attack people and whip them with its tail. This is false. In truth, when disturbed this snake will usually quickly flee. It will sometimes vibrate the tip of its tail among the ground litter, making a sound suggestive of a rattlesnake. If trapped, it will aggressively defend itself, striking repeatedly and biting.
