= Masticophis mentovarius =

Conservation status
- Least Concern (IUCN 3.1)

Scientific classification
- Kingdom: Animalia
- Phylum: Chordata
- Class: Reptilia
- Order: Squamata
- Suborder: Serpentes
- Family: Colubridae
- Genus: Masticophis
- Species: M. mentovarius

Binomial name
- Masticophis mentovarius (A.M.C. Duméril, Bibron & A.H.A. Duméril, 1854)

Species of lizard

Masticophis mentovarius, the neotropical whip snake, is a species of snake found in Mexico, Belize, Guatemala, Honduras, El Salvador, Nicaragua, Costa Rica, Panama, Colombia, and Venezuela.
