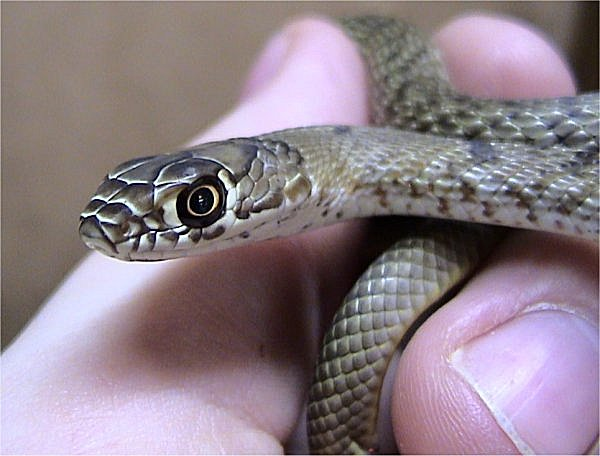
- Masticophis flagellum testaceus, western coachwhip, juvenile

Scientific classification
- Kingdom: Animalia
- Phylum: Chordata
- Class: Reptilia
- Order: Squamata
- Suborder: Serpentes
- Family: Colubridae
- Subfamily: Colubrinae
- Genus: Masticophis; Baird & Girard, 1853

Species
- 13, see text.

Synonyms
- Bascanion, Bascanium, Coryphodon, Herpetodryas

= Masticophis =

Genus of snakes

Masticophis is a genus of snakes, commonly referred to as whip snakes or coachwhips, in the subfamily Colubrinae of the family Colubridae. The genus is endemic to the Americas. Member species are characterized by having a long, thin body and are not dangerous to humans.

== Distribution and habitat ==
Species of Masticophis are found in the United States, Mexico, Central America, and northern South America.

== Description ==
Adults of species in the genus Masticophis may attain a total length (tail included) from 1.52 m (5.0 ft) for M. lateralis to 2.59 m (8.5 ft) for M. flagellum. A distinctive character of this genus is the shape of the frontal scale (the large scale in the center of the upper surface of the head) which is bell-shaped and elongated. At the rear of the body, the dorsal scales are arranged in only 13 rows.

== Species and subspecies ==
The genus Masticophis contains 13 species that are recognized as being valid, six of which have recognized subspecies.

- Masticophis anthonyi (Stejneger, 1901) – Clarion Island whip snake
- Masticophis aurigulus (Cope, 1861) – Baja California striped whip snake
- Masticophis barbouri (Van Denburgh & Slevin, 1921) – Baja California striped whip snake, Espiritu Santo striped whip snake
- Masticophis bilineatus Jan, 1863 – Sonoran whip snake
- Masticophis flagellum (Shaw, 1802) – coachwhip
  - Masticophis flagellum flagellum (Shaw, 1802) – eastern coachwhip
  - Masticophis flagellum lineatulus H.M. Smith, 1941 – lined coachwhip
  - Masticophis flagellum testaceus (Say, 1823) – western coachwhip
- Masticophis fuliginosus (Cope, 1895) – Baja California coachwhip
- Masticophis lateralis (Hallowell, 1853 – California whipsnake
  - Masticophis lateralis euryxanthus Riemer, 1954 – Alameda striped racer
  - Masticophis lateralis lateralis (Hallowell, 1853) – California striped racer

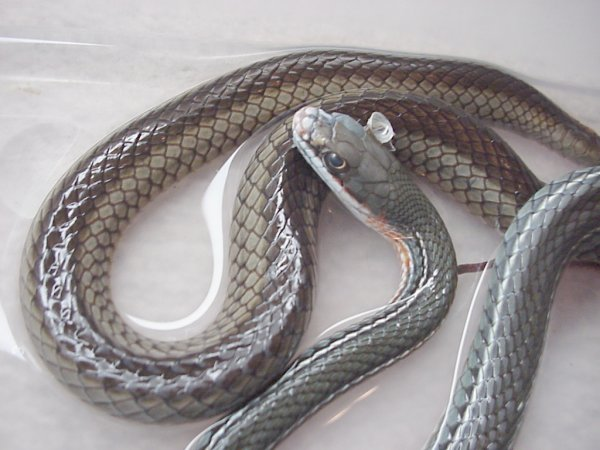
Masticophis schotti schotti, Schott's whip snake

- Masticophis lineatus (Bocourt, 1890)
- Masticophis mentovarius (A.M.C. Duméril, Bibron & A.H.A. Duméril, 1854) – neotropical whip snake
  - Masticophis mentovarius centralis (Roze, 1953)
  - Masticophis mentovarius mentovarius (A.M.C. Duméril, Bibron & A.H.A. Duméril, 1854)
  - Masticophis mentovarius suborbitalis (W. Peters, 1868)
  - Masticophis mentovarius striolatus (Mertens, 1934)
  - Masticophis mentovarius variolosus H.M. Smith, 1943
- Masticophis piceus (Cope, 1892)
  - Masticophis piceus cingulum Lowe & Woodin, 1954 – Sonoran coachwhip
  - Masticophis piceus piceus (Cope, 1892) – red coachwhip
  - Masticophis piceus ruddocki Brattstrom & Warren, 1953 – San Joaquin coachwhip
- Masticophis schotti Baird & Girard, 1853 – Schott's whip snake
  - Masticophis schotti ruthveni Ortenburger, 1923 – Ruthven's whip snake
  - Masticophis schotti schotti Baird & Girard, 1853 – Schott's whip snake
- Masticophis slevini (Lowe & Norris, 1955) – Isla San Esteban whipsnake, San Esteban Island whipsnake
- Masticophis taeniatus (Hallowell, 1852) – striped whip snake
  - Masticophis taeniatus girardi (Stejneger & Barbour, 1917) – Central Texas whip snake
  - Masticophis taeniatus taeniatus (Hallowell, 1852) – desert striped whip snake

Nota bene: A binomial authority or trinomial authority in parentheses indicates that the species or subspecies was originally described in a genus other than Masticophis.
