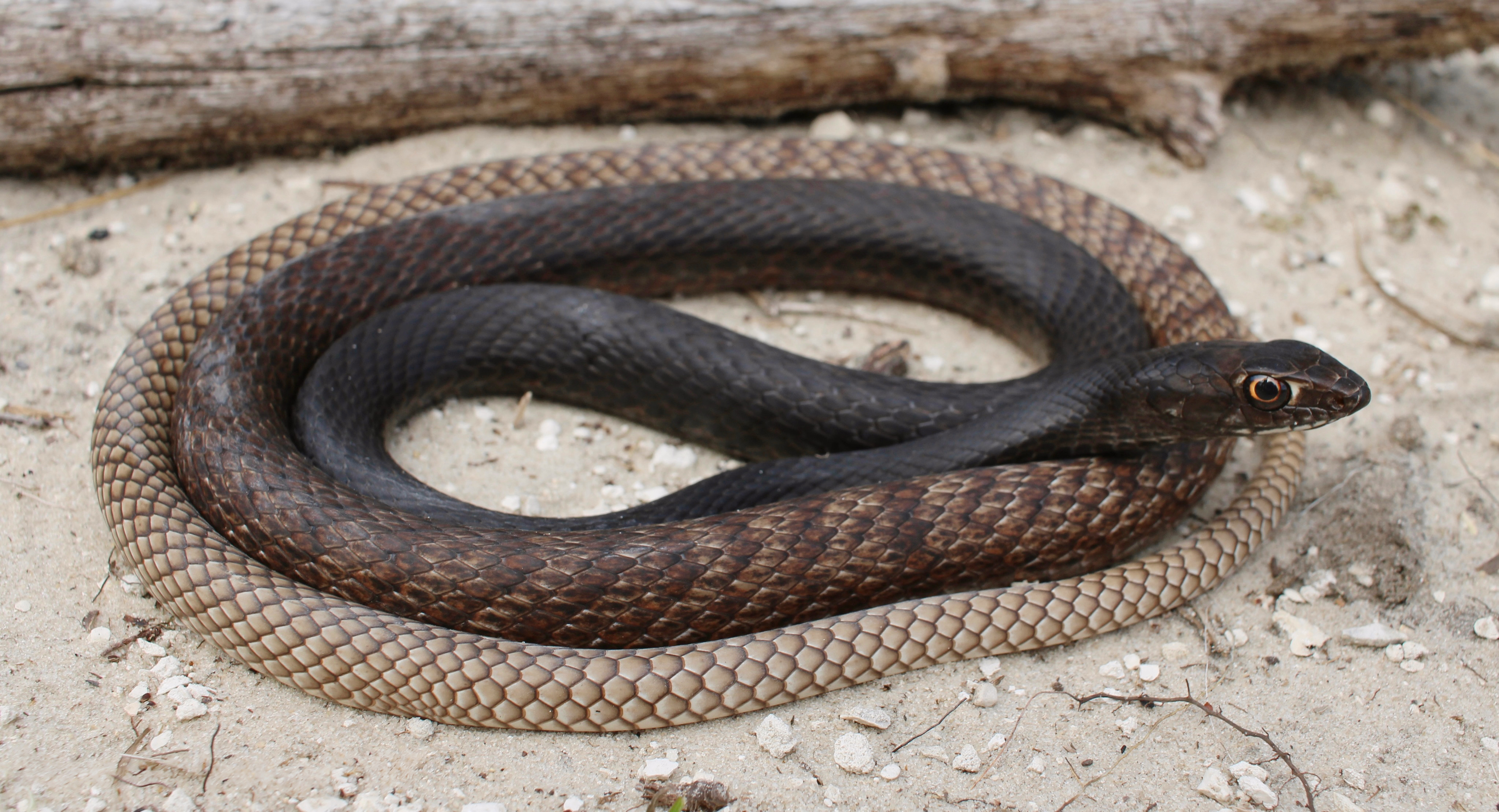
- Eastern coachwhip (Masticophis flagellum flagellum)

Conservation status
- Least Concern (IUCN 3.1)

Scientific classification
- Kingdom: Animalia
- Phylum: Chordata
- Class: Reptilia
- Order: Squamata
- Suborder: Serpentes
- Family: Colubridae
- Genus: Masticophis
- Species: M. flagellum

Binomial name
- Masticophis flagellum (Shaw, 1802)
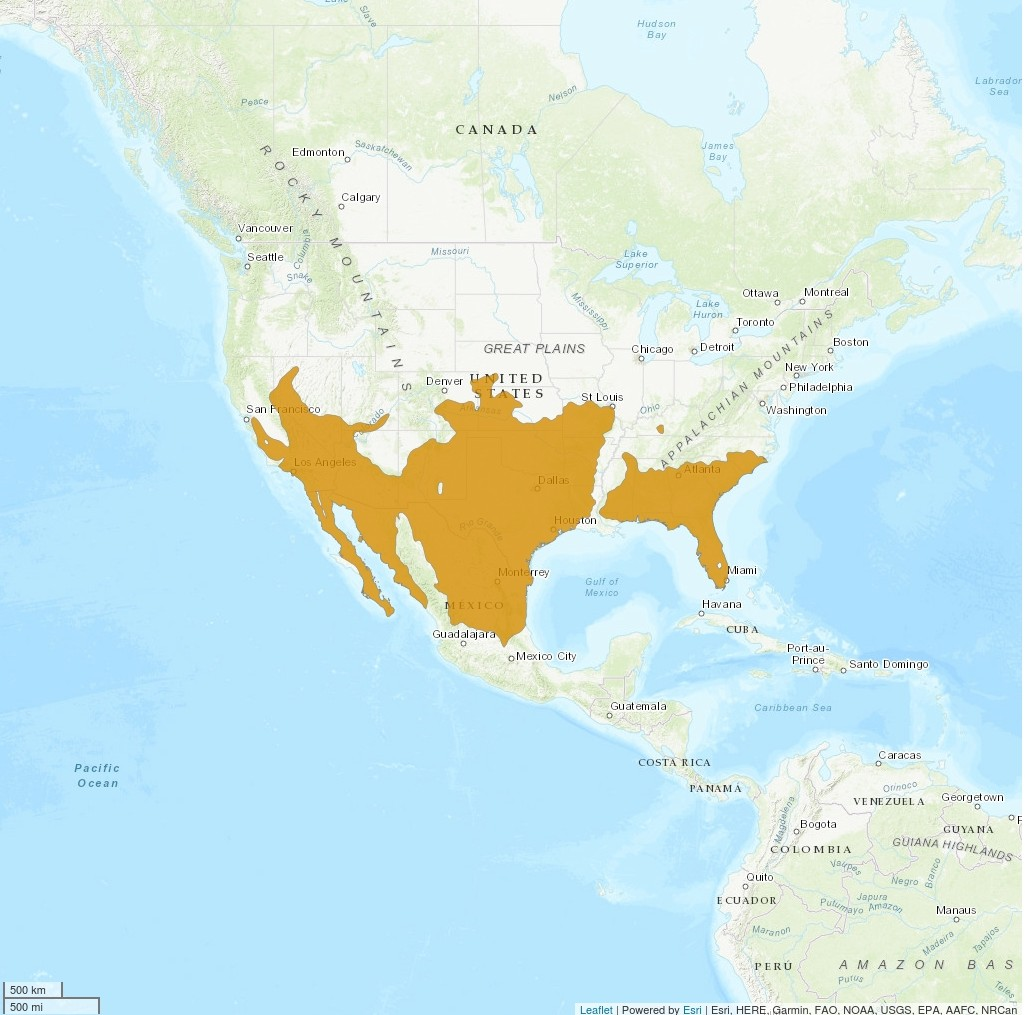

Synonyms
- List: Coluber flagellum Shaw, 1802; Psammophis flagelliformis Holbrook, 1842; Herpetodryas flagelliformis — A.M.C. Duméril & Bibron, 1854; Zamenis flagelliformis — Boulenger, 1893; Bascanion flagellum — Lönnberg, 1894; Masticophis flagellum — Taylor, 1938; Coluber flagellum — Utiger et al., 2005; Coluber flagellum — Liner, 2007; Masticophis flagellum — Collins & Taggart, 2009

= Masticophis flagellum =

Species of snake

Masticophis flagellum is a species of nonvenomous colubrid snake, commonly referred to as the coachwhip, whip snake or the red racer. It is endemic to the United States and Mexico. Three subspecies are recognized (including the nominotypical subspecies). It is listed as a species of Least Concern by the IUCN.

== Taxonomy ==
=== Etymology ===
The generic name Masticophis is derived from the Greek words mastix, meaning "whip", and ophis, meaning "serpent". The specific name flagellum is Latin for "whip". The scientific name was given due to the braided, whip-like appearance of the tail coupled with the length of the snake. Subspecific translations are as follows: lineatulus, (linea) Latin for "line"; testaceus, Latin for "hard covering made of brick or tile", in reference to the scaling pattern of the snake.

=== Subspecies ===
Including the nominotypical subspecies, there are three subspecies of Masticophis flagellum that are recognized as being valid. Scientific and common names are listed below.

Image	Species	Common name
	M. f. flagellum (Shaw, 1802)	eastern coachwhip
	M. f. lineatulus H.M. Smith, 1941	lined coachwhip
	M. f. testaceus (Say, 1823)	western coachwhip

Nota bene: A trinomial authority in parentheses indicates that the subspecies was originally described in a genus other than Masticophis.

== Description ==
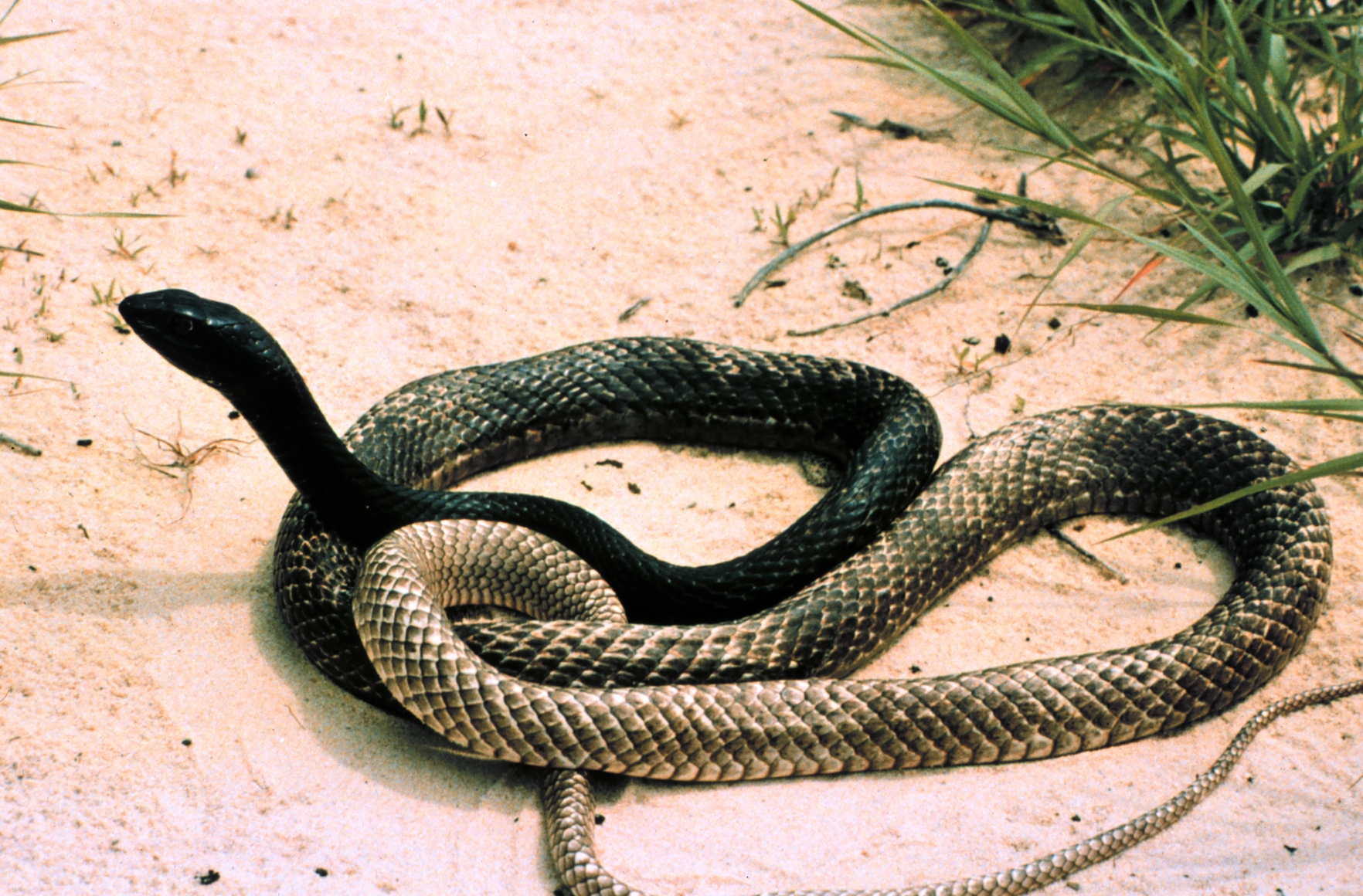
Eastern coachwhip (M. f. flagellum), Weeks Bay National Estuarine Research Reserve, Alabama

Coachwhips are thin-bodied snakes with small heads and large eyes with round pupils. They vary greatly in color, but most reflect a proper camouflage for their natural habitat. M. f. testaceus is typically a shade of light brown with darker brown flecking, but in the western area of Texas, where the soil color is a shade of pink, the coachwhips are also pink in color. M. f. piceus was given its common name because specimens frequently, but not always, have some red in their coloration. Coachwhip scales are patterned so at first glance, the snake appears braided. Subspecies can be difficult to distinguish in areas where their ranges overlap. Adult sizes of 127–183 cm (50–72 in) in total length (including tail) are common. The record sized specimen, of the eastern coachwhip race, was 259 cm (102 in) in total length. Young specimens, mostly just over 100 cm (40 in) in length, were found to have weighed 180 to 675 g (6 1/2 to 24 oz), whereas good-sized mature adults measuring 163 to 235 cm (64 to 93 in) weighed 1.2 to 1.8 kg (2 lb 10 oz to 3 lb 15 oz).

== Distribution and habitat ==
Coachwhips range throughout the southern United States from coast to coast. They are also found in the northern half of Mexico. Coachwhips have one of the largest home ranges of any snake, with some being reported to range across and up to 56 hectares.

Coachwhips are commonly found in open areas with sandy soil, open pine forests, old fields, and prairies. They thrive in sandhill scrub and coastal dunes. However, they prefer oak savannas in eastern Texas.

Coachwhips have been found to tolerate isolated, buffered habitat fragments; however, habitat configuration and edge exposure may be factors which can negatively influence the viability of habitat use by this sensitive species.

== Behavior ==
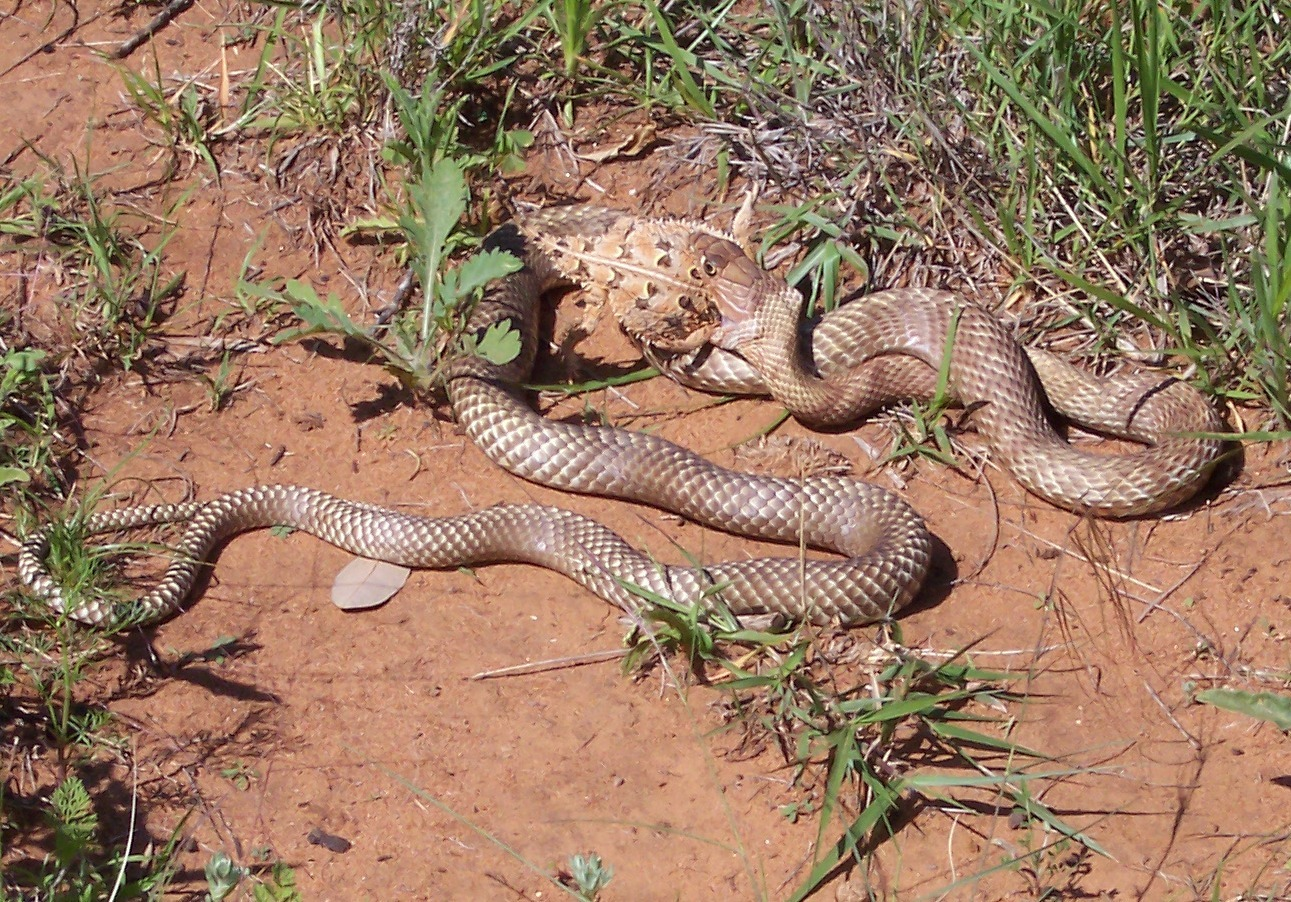
Western coachwhip (M. f. testaceus) eating a Texas horned lizard.

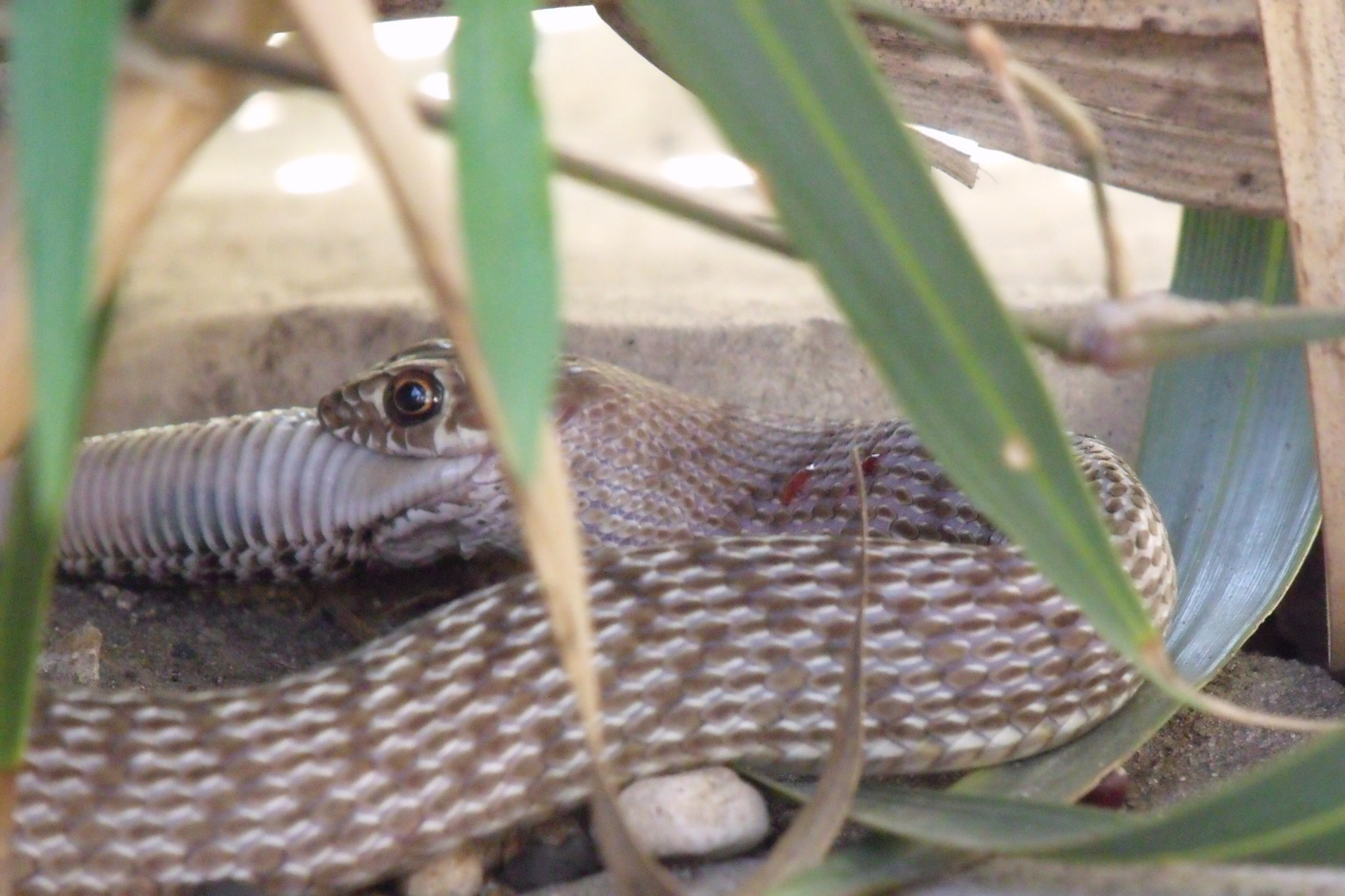
M. f. testaceus feeding on a western diamondback rattlesnake

They tend to be sensitive to potential threats, and often bolt at the first sign of one, and will readily strike if cornered. Their bites can be painful, but generally are harmless unless they become infected, as is the case with any wound. They are curious snakes with good eyesight, and are sometimes seen periscoping, raising their heads above the level of the grass or rocks to see what is around them. They are extremely fast-moving snakes, able to move up to 4 miles per hour. Coachwhips have also been found to adjust their space-use behavior with changes in habitat fragment size, tolerating more crowded conditions, reduced home-range sizes, and increased home-range overlap when available habitat area decreased.

=== Feeding ===
Coachwhips are diurnal, and actively eat different types of prey including other snakes, lizards, frogs, rodents, birds (including hatchlings and eggs), and insects (cicadas, crickets). These snakes have also been found to ingest carrion and, in rare instances, demonstrated cannibalism. They do not discriminate prey size, as they are opportunistic hunters. They have been described as "sit-and-wait" predators or ambush hunters. They utilize both enhanced vision and sensitive chemoreceptors in order to detect nearby prey. Coachwhips subdue prey by grasping and holding them with their jaws and do not use constriction.

== Myths ==
A few myths are associated with the coachwhip snake: that they deliberately chase people and whip them with their tails, that they suckle milk from farm animals, and are the legendary "hoop snakes". None of these are true.

== Gallery ==
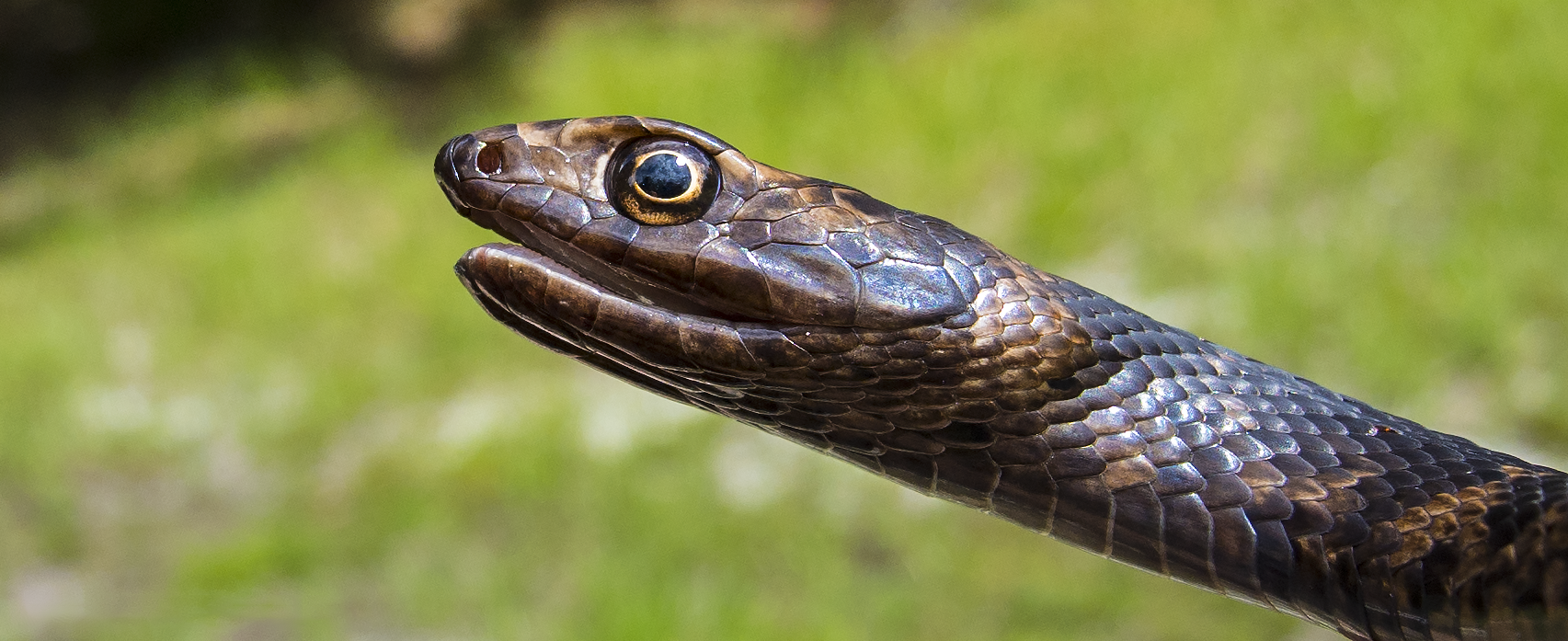
Head of an eastern coachwhip (M. f. flagellum), Florida

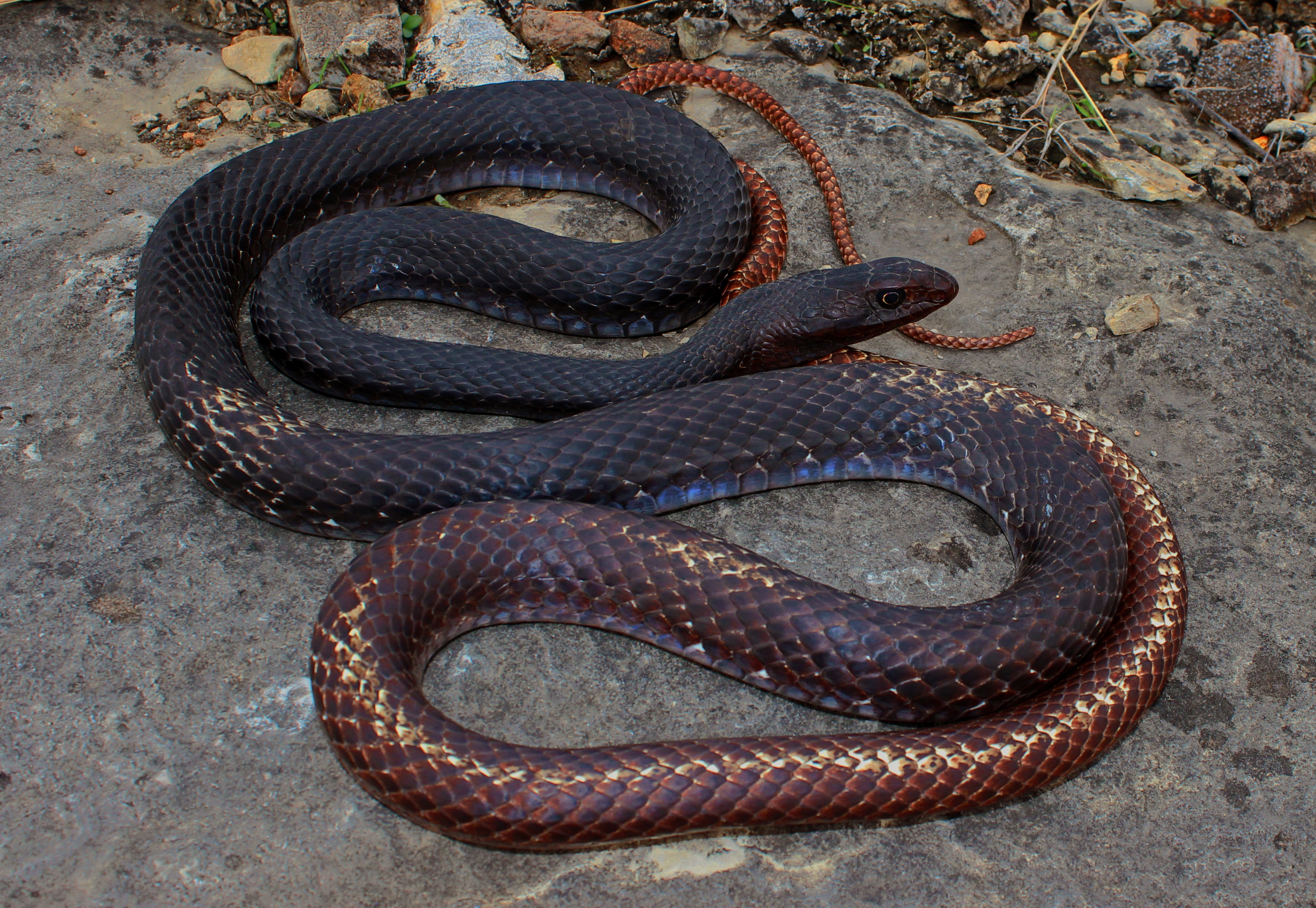
Eastern coachwhip (M. f. flagellum), St. Genevieve County, Missouri

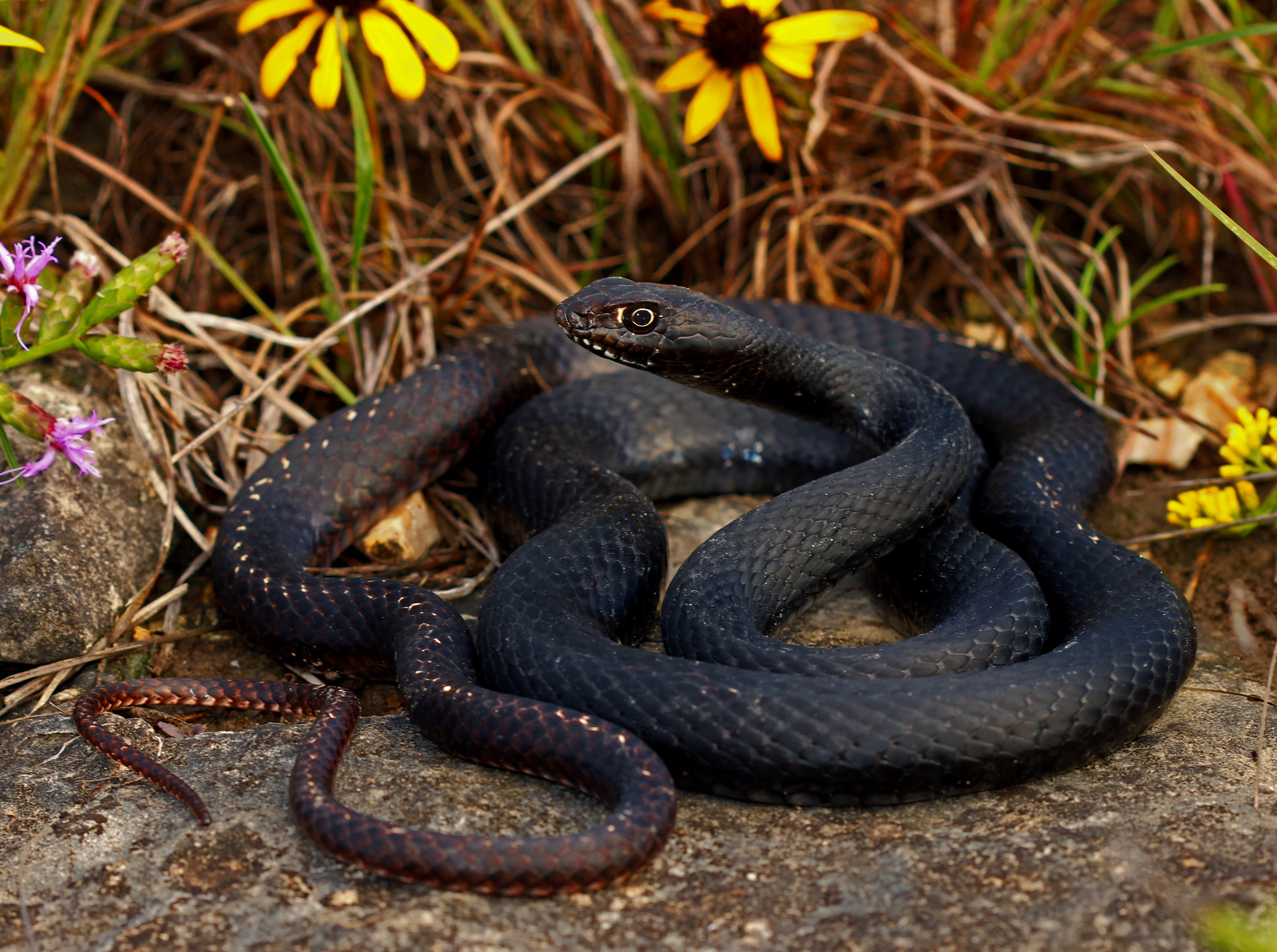
Eastern coachwhip (M. f. flagellum), Jefferson County, Missouri

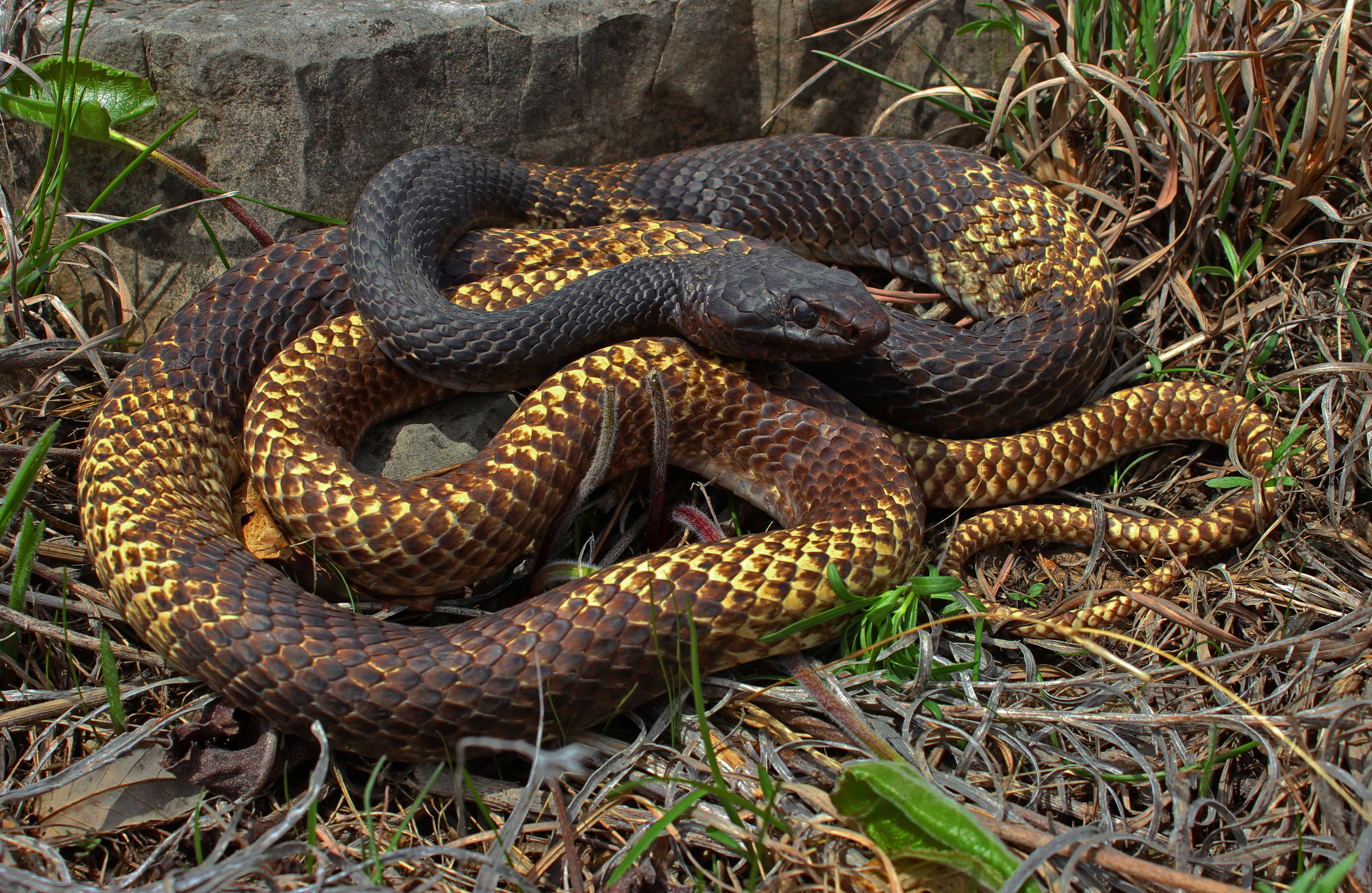
Eastern coachwhip (M. f. flagellum), Taney County, Missouri

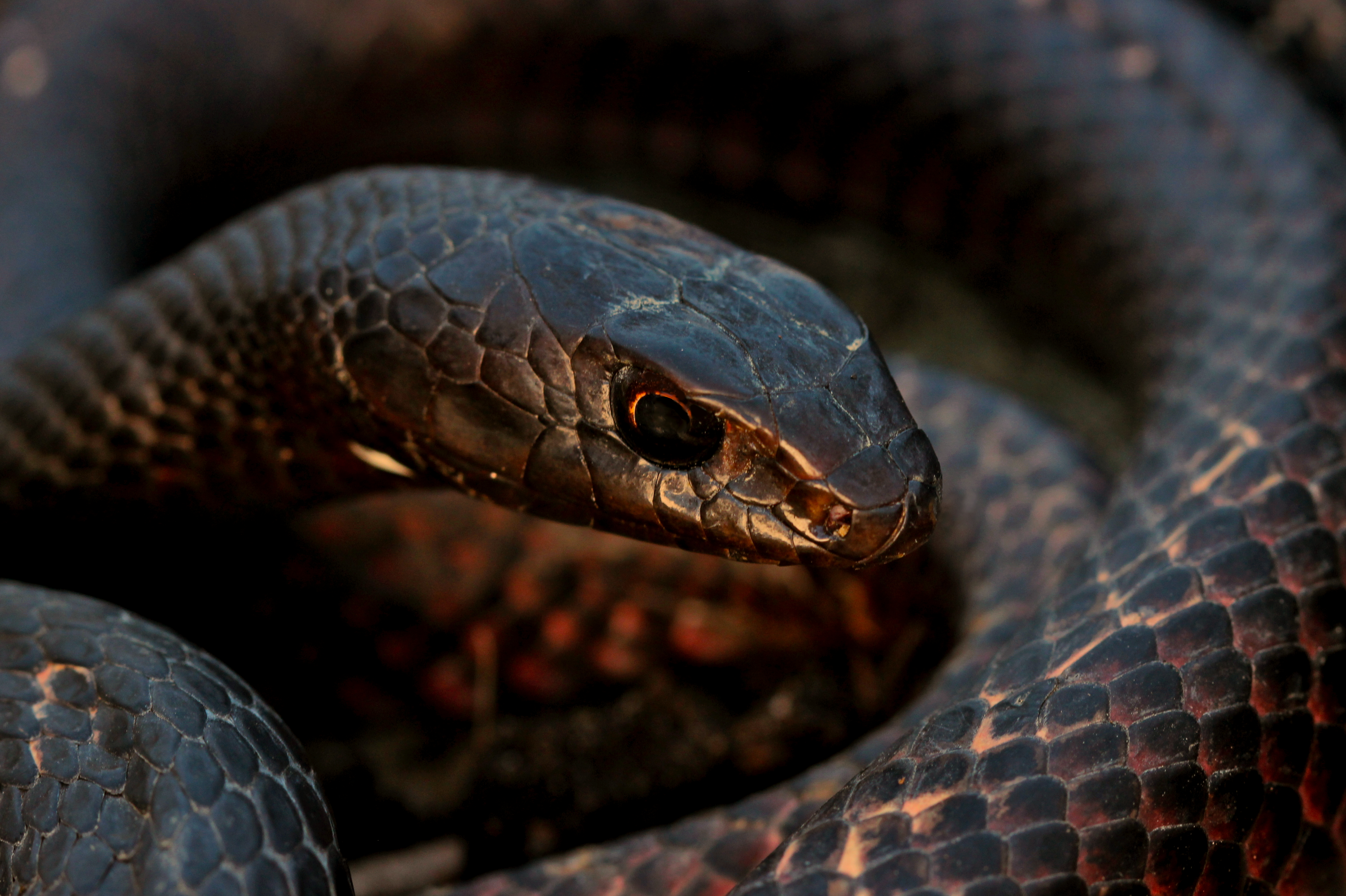
Head of an eastern coachwhip (M. f. flagellum) from the Ozarks, Missouri

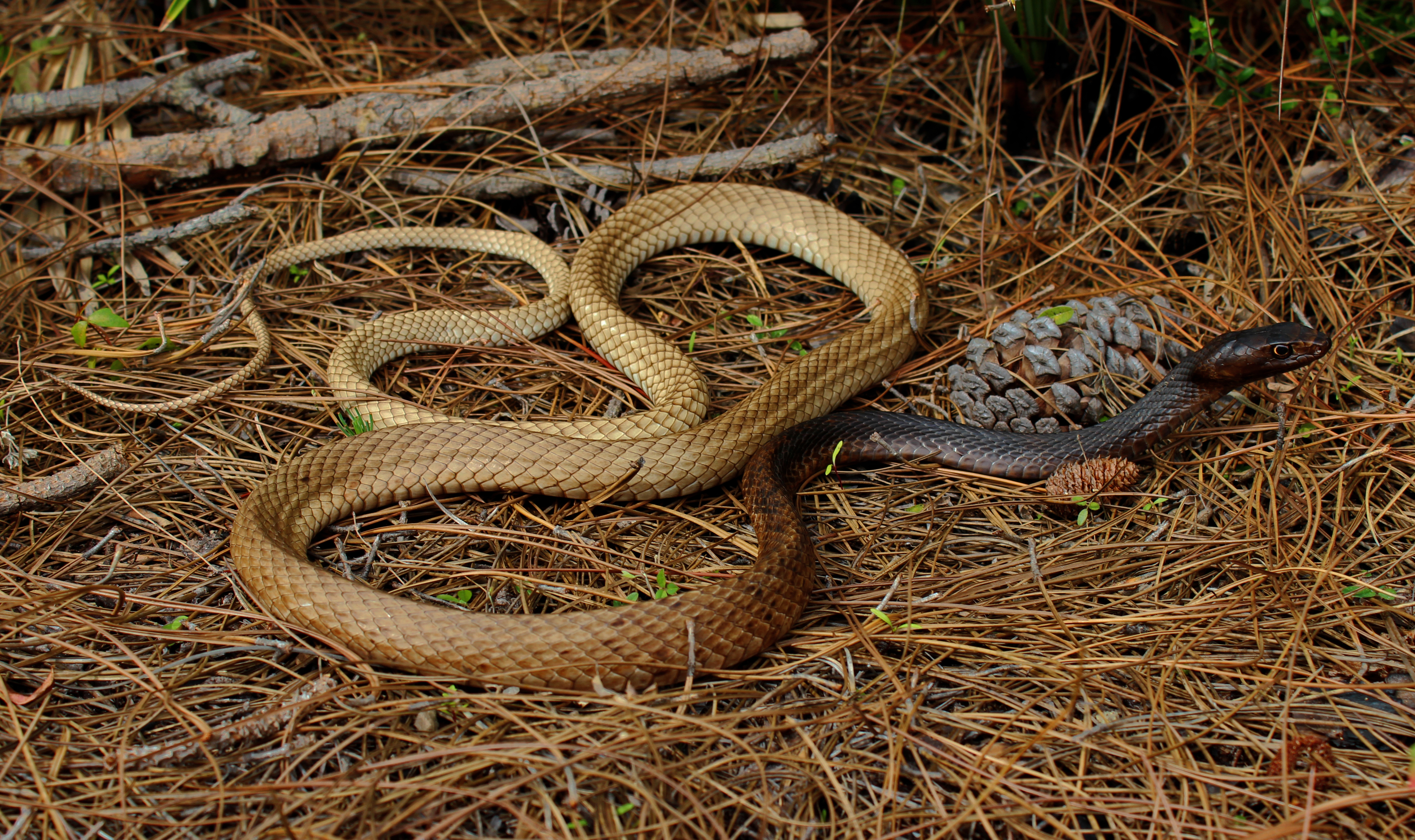
Eastern coachwhip (M. f. flagellum), Florida

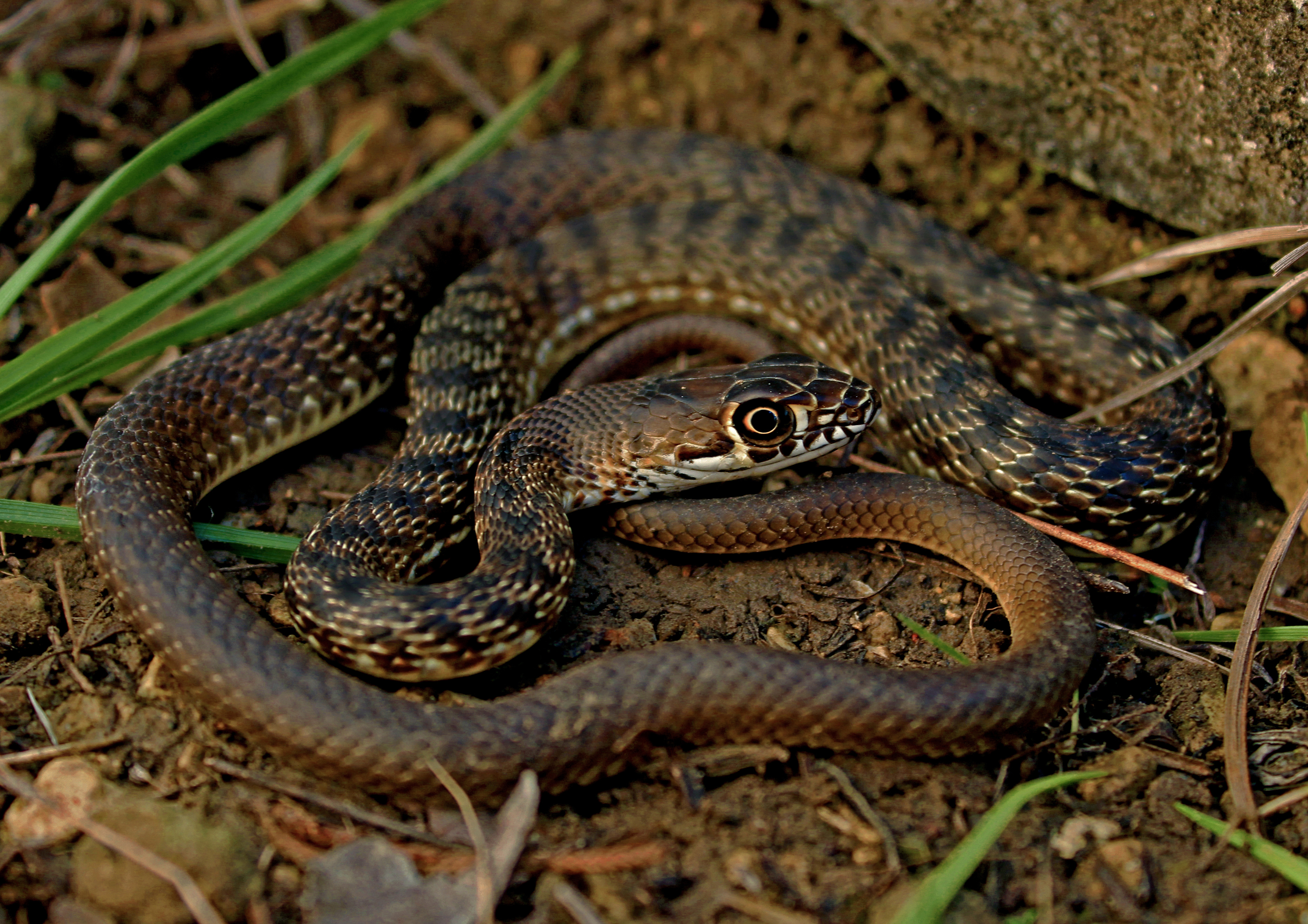
A juvenile eastern coachwhip (M. f. flagellum), Jefferson County, Missouri

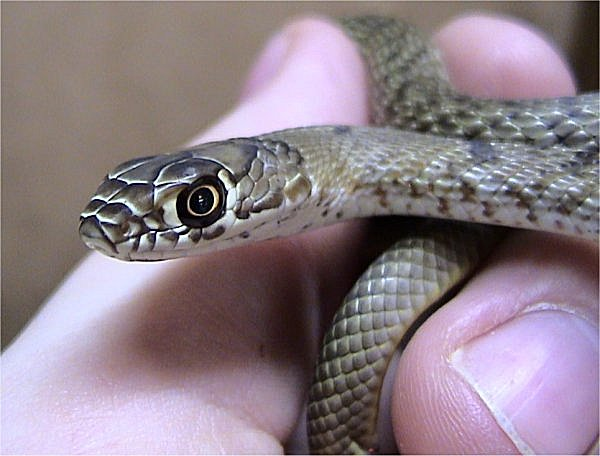
Juvenile western coachwhip (M. f. testaceus).

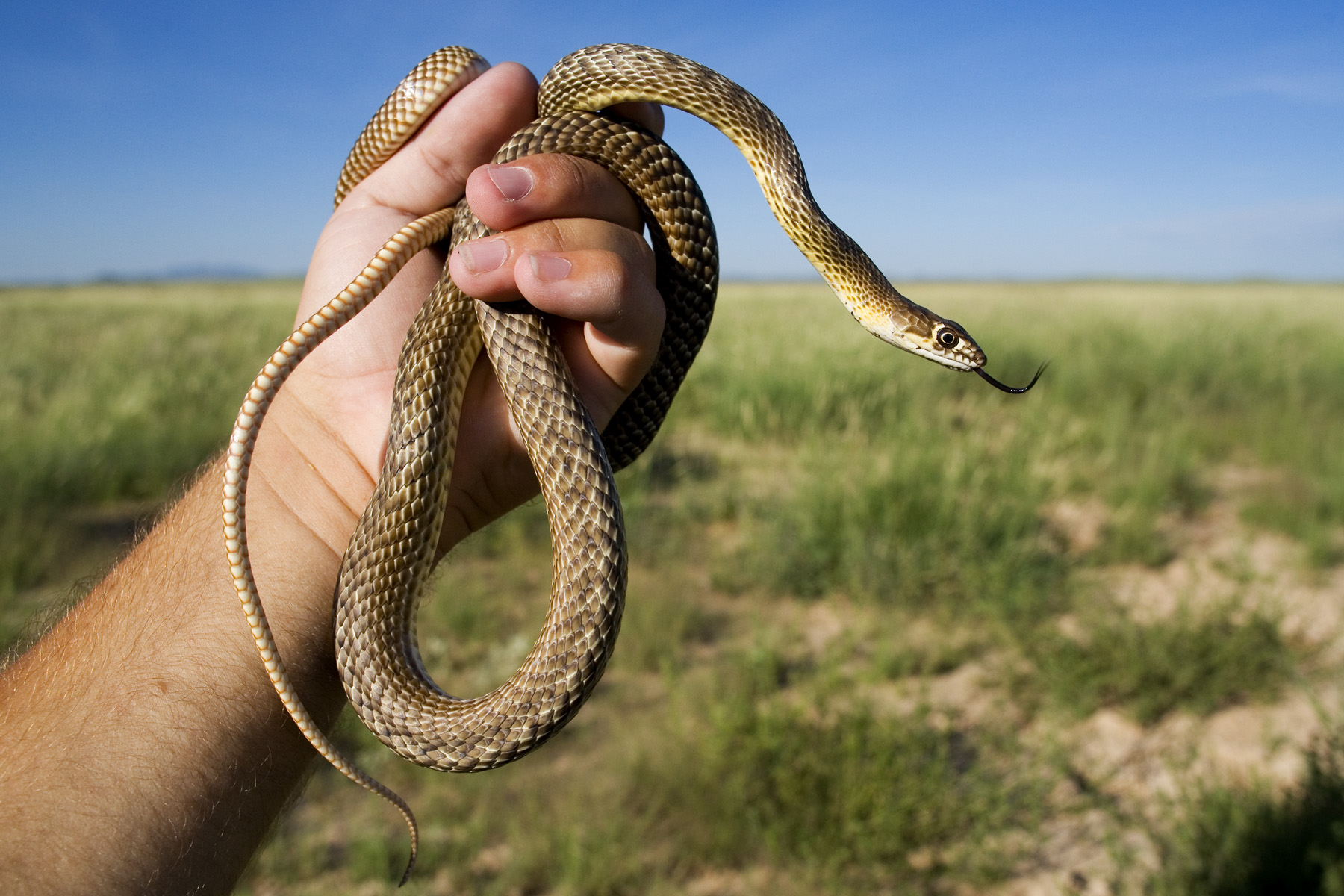
Western coachwhip (M. f. testaceus), Grant County, New Mexico
