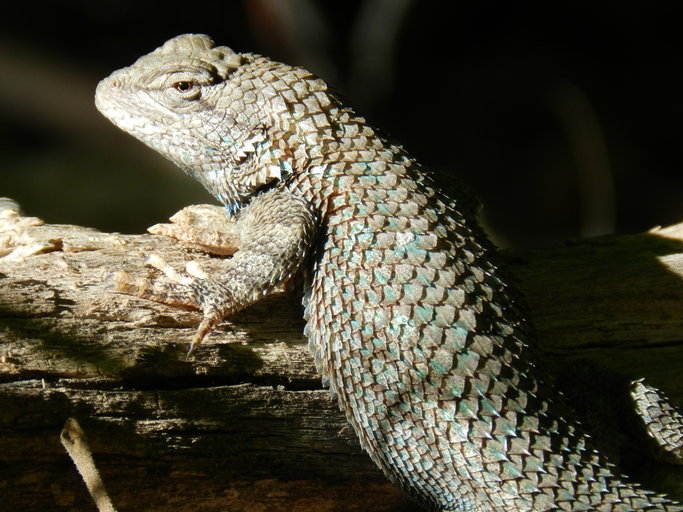

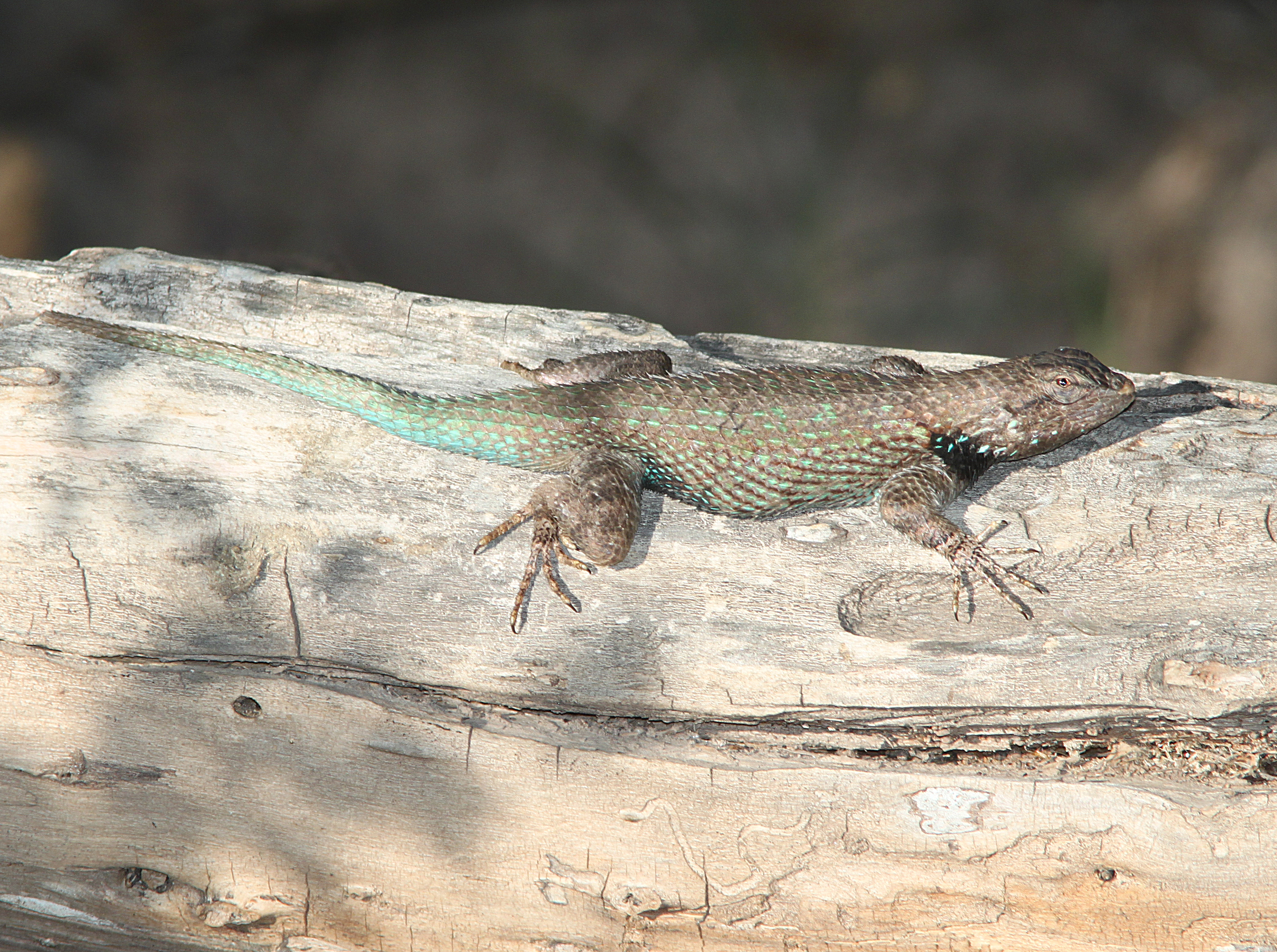
- A female at Gila National Forest, New Mexico and male at Santa Cruz Co, AZ

Conservation status
- Least Concern (IUCN 3.1)

Scientific classification
- Domain: Eukaryota
- Kingdom: Animalia
- Phylum: Chordata
- Class: Reptilia
- Order: Squamata
- Suborder: Iguania
- Family: Phrynosomatidae
- Genus: Sceloporus
- Species: S. clarkii

Binomial name
- Sceloporus clarkii Baird & Girard, 1852

= Sceloporus clarkii =

Clark's spiny lizard

Species of lizard

Sceloporus clarkii, Clark's spiny lizard, is a species of lizard in the family Phrynosomatidae. It is found in New Mexico and Arizona in the United States and Mexico.

== Gallery ==
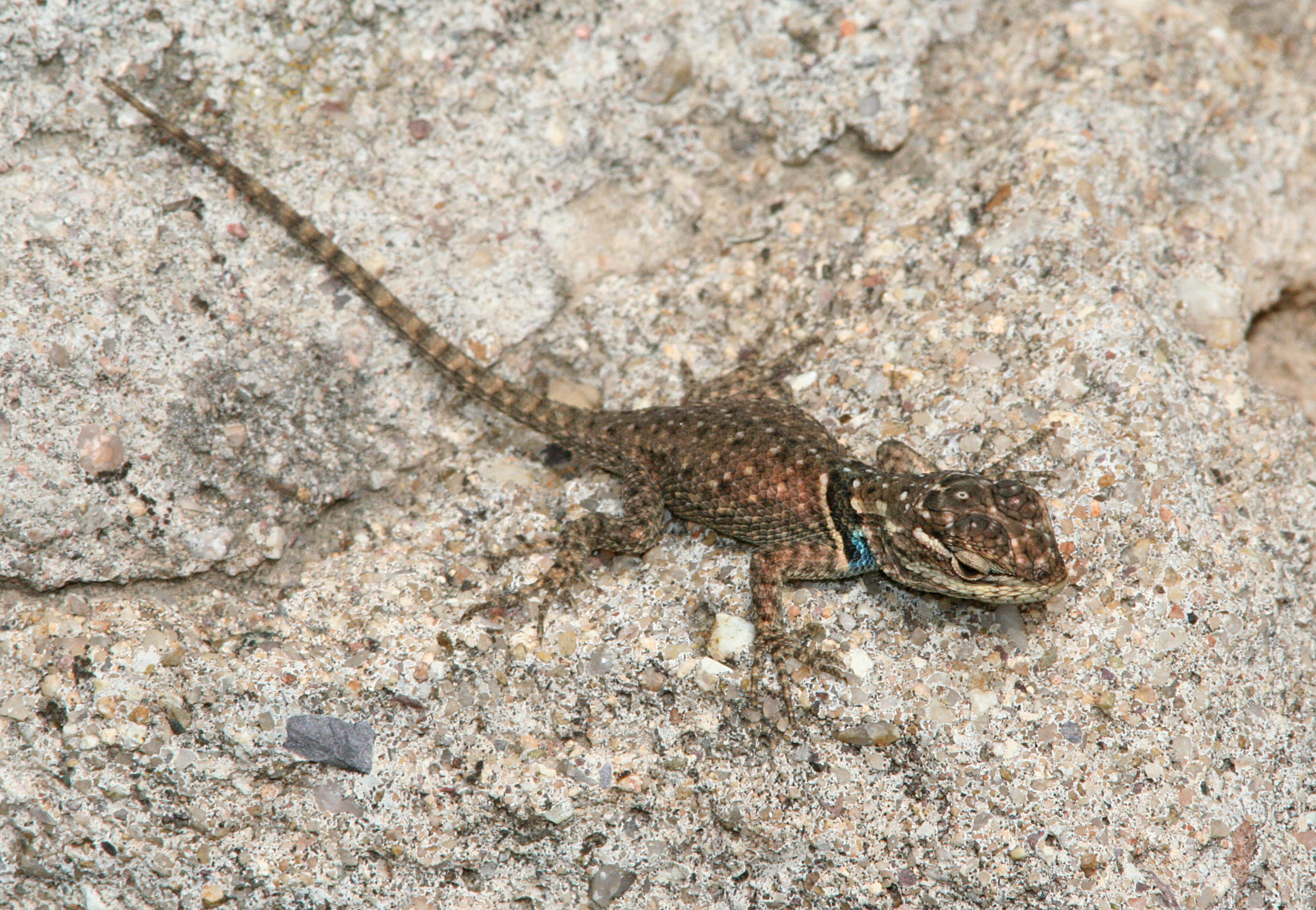
Juvenile in Chiricahua Mts, AZ

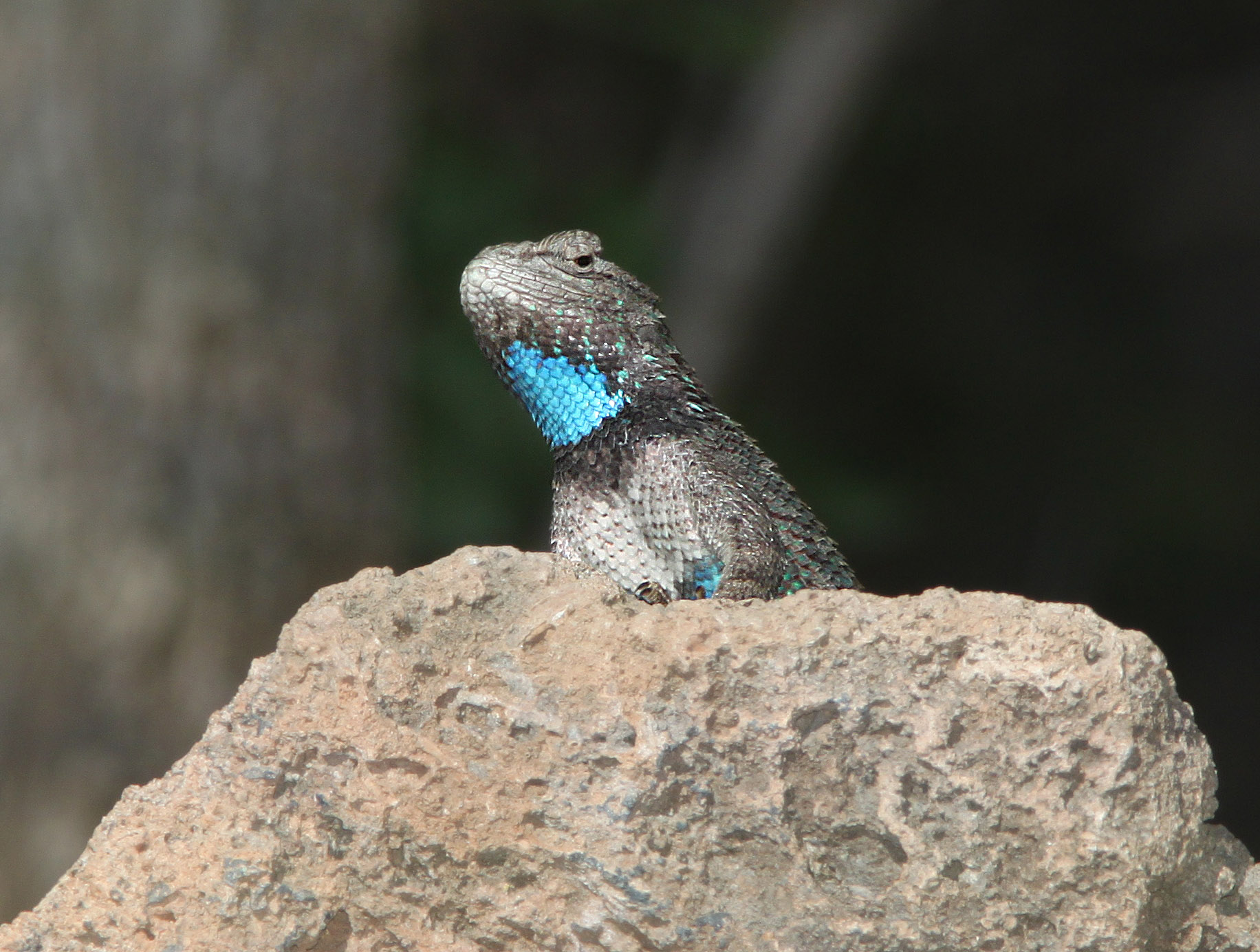
Adult male in Arizona

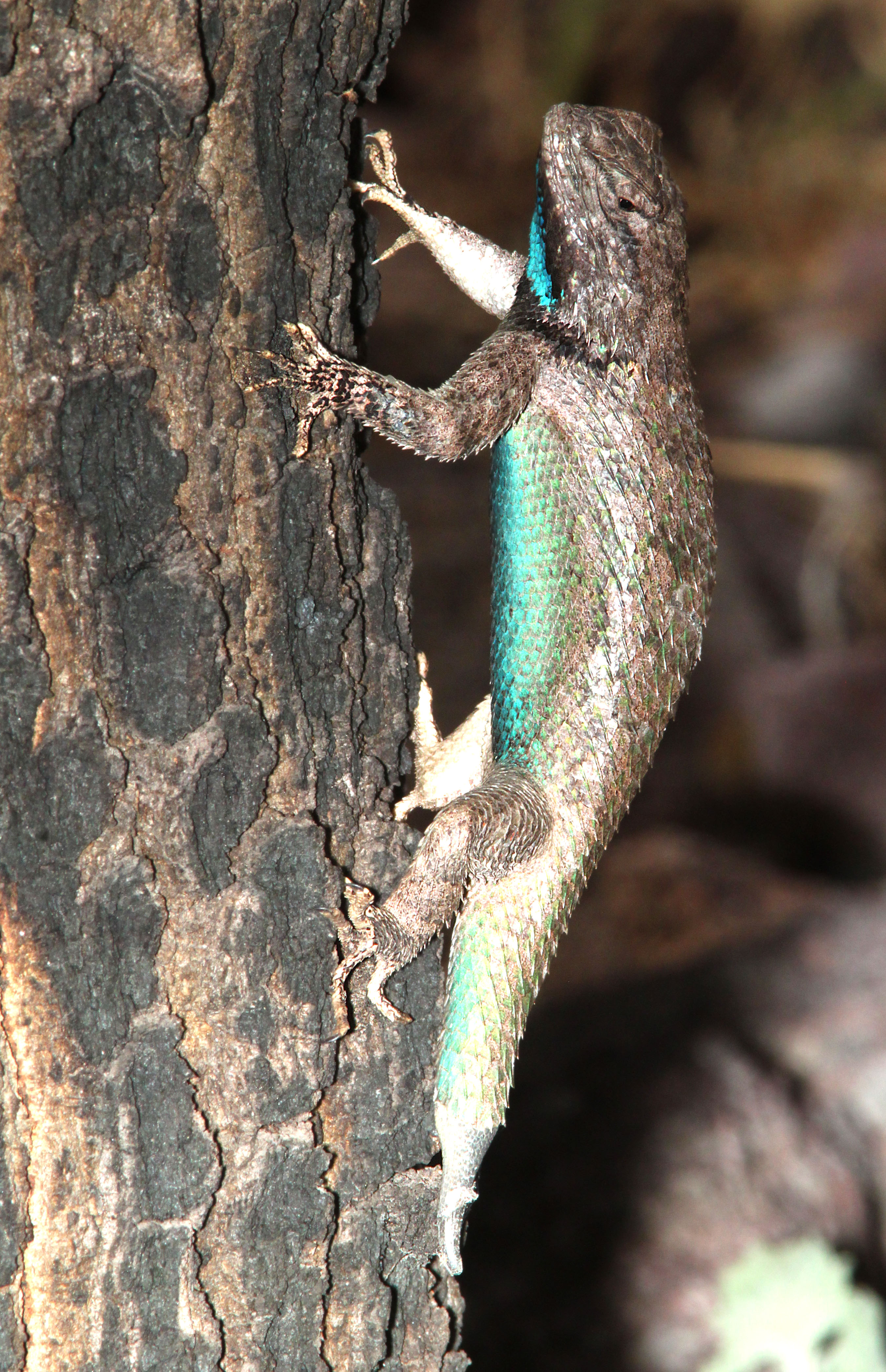
Adult male
