= Masticophis aurigulus =

Conservation status
- Least Concern (IUCN 3.1)

Scientific classification
- Kingdom: Animalia
- Phylum: Chordata
- Class: Reptilia
- Order: Squamata
- Suborder: Serpentes
- Family: Colubridae
- Genus: Masticophis
- Species: M. aurigulus

Binomial name
- Masticophis aurigulus Cope, 1861

Species of lizard

Masticophis aurigulus, the Baja California striped whip snake, is a species of snake found in Mexico.
