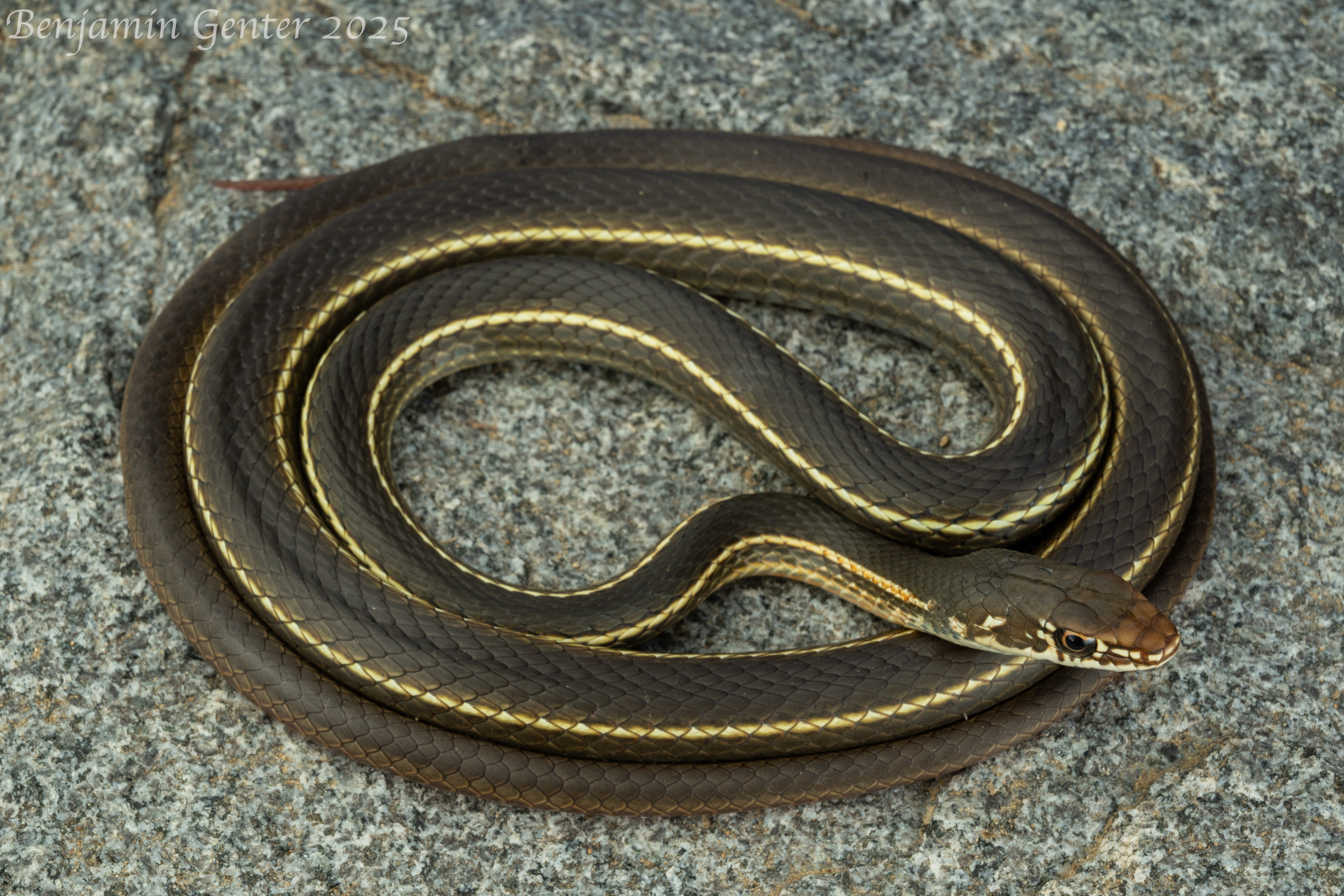
- M. l. lateralis
- M. l. euryxanthus

Conservation status
- Apparently Secure (NatureServe)

Scientific classification
- Kingdom: Animalia
- Phylum: Chordata
- Class: Reptilia
- Order: Squamata
- Suborder: Serpentes
- Family: Colubridae
- Genus: Masticophis
- Species: M. lateralis

Binomial name
- Masticophis lateralis (Hallowell, 1853)

Synonyms
- List: Leptophis lateralis Hallowell, 1853; Zamenis lateralis — Cope, 1898; Coluber lateralis — Stejneger & Barbour, 1917; Masticophis lateralis — Riemer, 1954

= California whipsnake =

Species of snake

The California whipsnake (Masticophis lateralis), also known as the striped racer, is a colubrid snake found in habitats of the coast, desert, and foothills of California.

== Taxonomy ==
As with many species and subspecies, taxonomic reclassification is an ongoing process, and differing sources often disagree. The genus Masticophis may soon be absorbed by the closely related genus Coluber, which contains the racer (Coluber constrictor).

=== Subspecies ===
Masticophis lateralis has two subspecies:

- M. l. lateralis (Hallowell, 1853) — chaparral whipsnake

The chaparral whipsnake is a common subspecies in California and northern Baja California, Mexico. The subspecies is often associated with broken (variable) habitat types that range from northwestern to extreme southern California and further south into Northwestern Mexico.

- M. l. euryxanthus Riemer, 1954 — Alameda whipsnake

The Alameda whipsnake subspecies is endemic to California. The subspecies is considered threatened there. Its range is relatively small, and much of the subspecies' habitat is threatened by development. It was first collected by Archie Mossman and later described by Riemer in 1954. The Alameda Whipsnake is a threatened species of colubrid snake distinguishable by its broad head, large eyes, black and orange coloring with a yellow stripe down each side, and a slender neck. The Alameda Whipsnake is a wary creature known for its speed and climbing abilities utilized when escaping predators or hunting prey.

Nota bene: A trinomial authority in parentheses indicates that the subspecies was originally described in a genus other than Masticophis.

== Habitat and geographic range ==
The California whipsnake, M. lateralis, has a range from Trinity County, California, west of the Sierra Nevada Mountains to northwestern Baja California, at altitudes between 0–2,250 metres (0–7,382 ft) and is known to use a wide variety of habitat types including the California coast and in the foothills, the chaparral of northern Baja, mixed deciduous and pine forests of the Sierra de Juárez, and deserts and canyons of Sierra San Pedro.

The geographic range of the Alameda whipsnake subspecies is contiguous in the area of southern Alameda County, northern Santa Clara County, and western San Joaquin County, in the southeastern Bay Area of Northern California. It has commonly been reported as having a more specific association with chaparral and scrub plant communities as the habitat where it is most commonly found.

Within these habitats the California whipsnake spends a majority of its time in rocky subterrain. This area provides it with shelter from predators and quick access to food sources such as lizards.

The geographic range of the chaparral whipsnake subspecies has been reported to include woodlands, grasslands, chaparral scrublands, and riparian habitats.

== Description ==
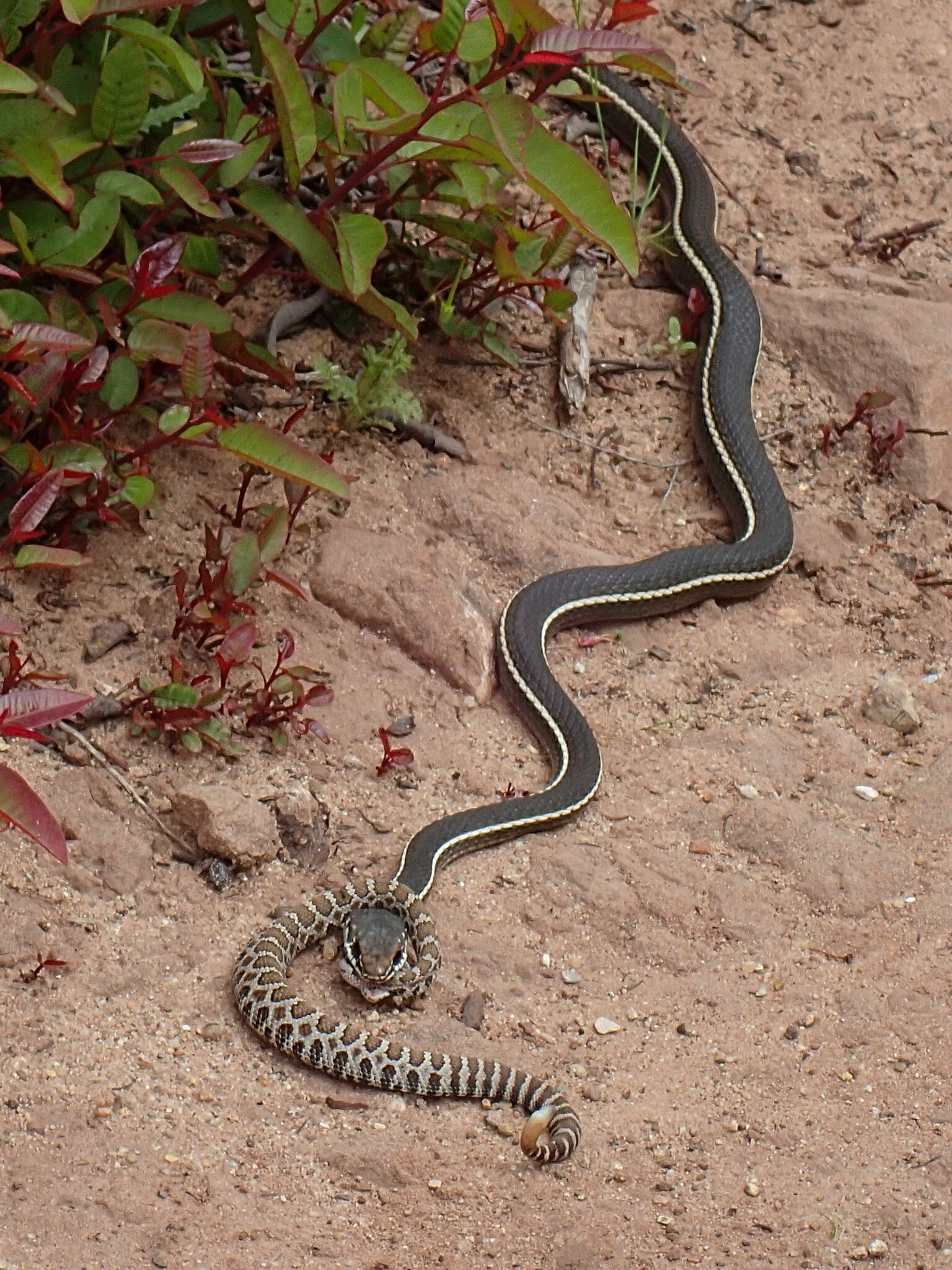
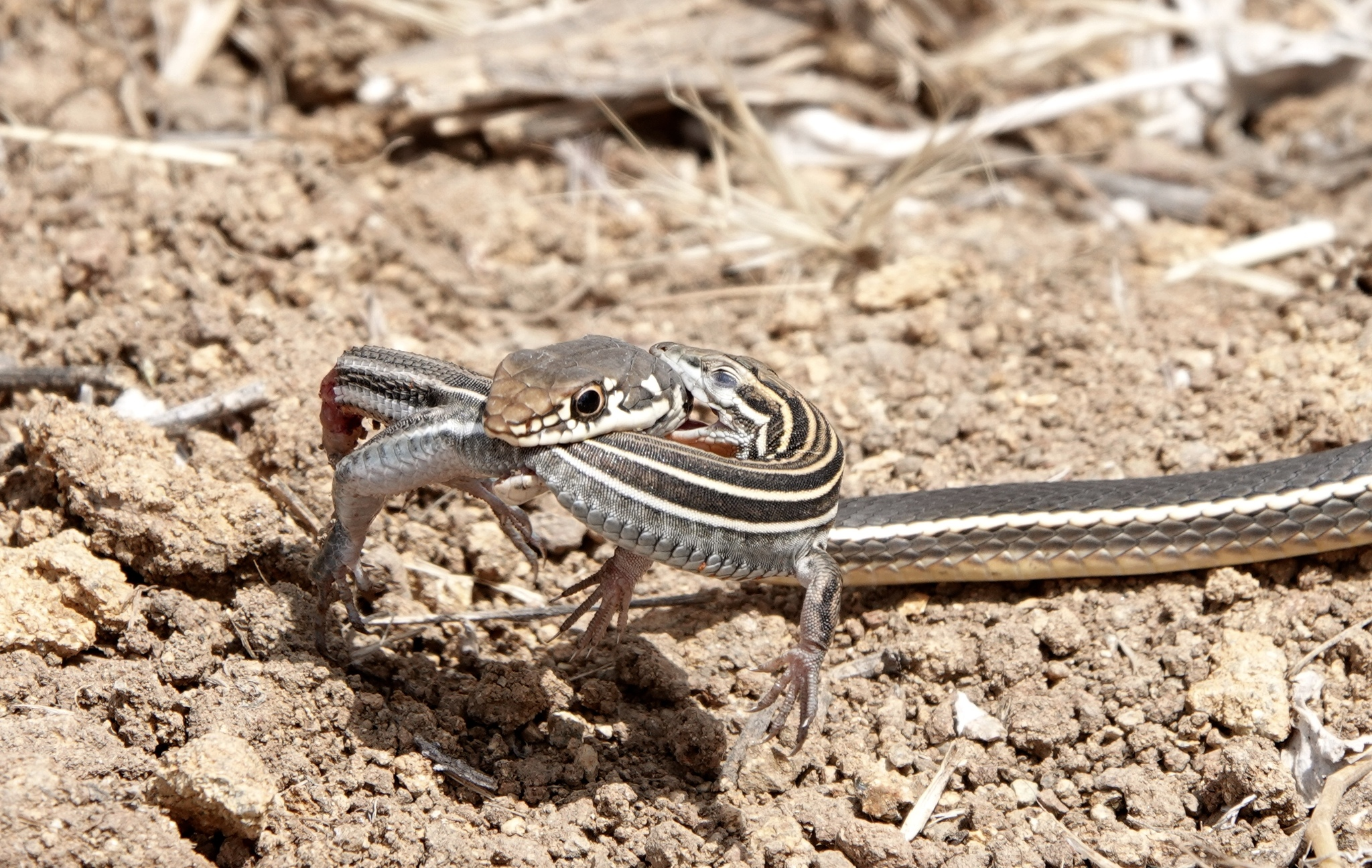
M. l. lateralis eating a Southern Pacific rattlesnake (top) and orange-throated whiptail (bottom)

Masticophis lateralis is 90–120 centimetres (3.0–3.9 ft) in total length (including tail). It is slender, with a yellowish stripe along each side, set against a dark brown or black back.

== Diet ==
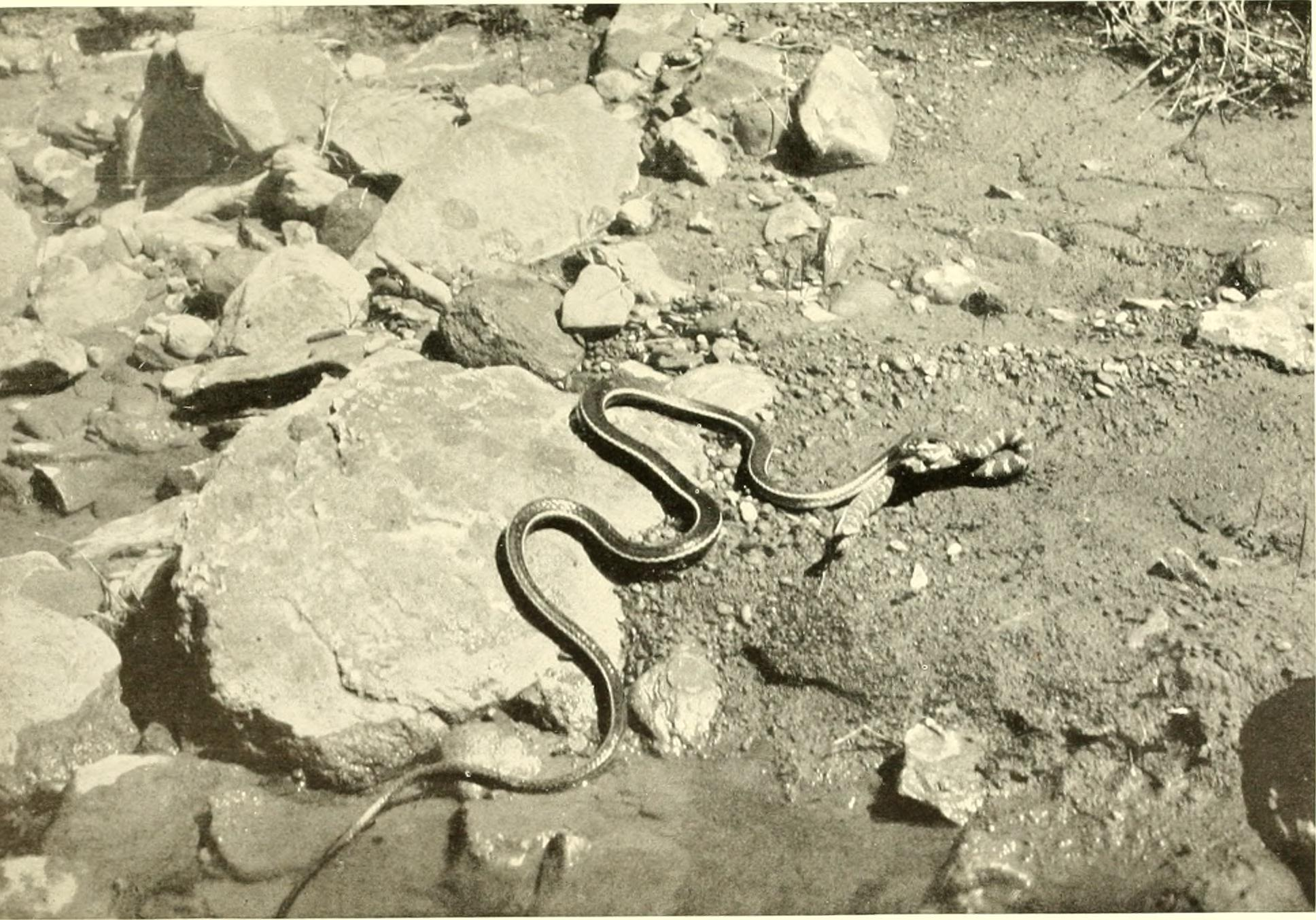
California whipsnake eating a western rattlesnake

The California whipsnake is known to eat a variety of live animals including insects, lizards, snakes, birds, and small mammals. It shows a strong preference for lizards, which are captured by a grasp of the mouth, and swallowed alive.

== Behavior ==
Masticophis lateralis is fast-moving, diurnal, and an active forager. It commonly moves over and through brush and trees to avoid predation and to capture prey. The California whipsnake has been observed moving into the top of scrub plants after emerging from nightly retreats to gain access to direct sunlight before the sunlight reaches ground level. It is not venomous, but likely to strike if captured.

== Reproduction ==
The California whipsnake mates during the spring after they complete their hibernation that spans from November to February. A typical, California whipsnake produces a clutch of six to eleven eggs, that require a maturation period of 3 months. After birth the brood is left to their own devices, as the parent snakes pay little to no attention to them.

== Threats ==
In 1997, the California whipsnake was listed as an endangered species. Its most common threat is urbanization as it has inhabited many densely populated counties across California and mostly the Bay Area. Urbanization presents individual threats that result in population decline. Whipsnakes can experience injury or death via unperceived predators such as cats or vehicles. Their habitats can also be altered by fire enforcement. This process works to eliminate the danger of fire in certain habitats. Fire can be very beneficial to California whipsnakes, as it naturally resets their ecosystem with new growth after a burn.
