= Masticophis barbouri =

Conservation status
- Data Deficient (IUCN 3.1)

Scientific classification
- Kingdom: Animalia
- Phylum: Chordata
- Class: Reptilia
- Order: Squamata
- Suborder: Serpentes
- Family: Colubridae
- Genus: Masticophis
- Species: M. barbouri

Binomial name
- Masticophis barbouri (Van Denburgh & Slevin, 1921)

Species of lizard

Masticophis barbouri, the Baja California striped whip snake, is a species of snake found in Mexico.
