= List of snakes of Arizona =

This is a list of the known snakes of Arizona. The Arizona State Reptile is the Arizona ridge-nosed rattlesnake (Crotalus willardi willardi).

== Snakes ==
Image	Scientific Name	Common Name	Venomous to humans	Family	Note(s)
	Arizona elegans	Glossy snake	No	Colubridae	
	Crotalus atrox	Western diamondback rattlesnake	Yes	Viperidae	
	Crotalus cerastes	Sidewinder rattlesnake	Yes	Viperidae	
	Crotalus cerberus	Arizona black rattlesnake	Yes	Viperidae	
	Crotalus lepidus	Rock rattlesnake	Yes	Viperidae	
	Crotalus lutosus	Great Basin rattlesnake	Yes	Viperidae	
	Crotalus molossus	Blacktail rattlesnake	Yes	Viperidae	
	Crotalus oreganus abyssus	Grand Canyon rattlesnake	Yes	Viperidae	
	Crotalus pricei	Twin-spotted rattlesnake	Yes	Viperidae	
	Crotalus pyrrhus	Speckled rattlesnake	Yes	Viperidae	Coloration varies between populations.
	Crotalus scutulatus	Mojave rattlesnake	Yes	Viperidae	
	Crotalus tigris	Tiger rattlesnake	Yes	Viperidae	
	Crotalus viridis nuntius	Hopi rattlesnake	Yes	Viperidae	
	Crotalus willardi willardi	Arizona ridge-nosed rattlesnake	Yes	Viperidae	
	Diadophis punctatus regalis	Regal ringneck snake	No	Dipsadidae	This subspecies often lacks ring-neck
	Gyalopion canum	Chihuahuan hook-nosed snake	No	Colubridae	
	Gyalopion quadrangulare	Thornscrub hook-nosed snake	No	Colubridae	
	Heterodon kennerlyi	Mexican hognose snake	No	Dipsadidae	
	Hypsiglena chlorophaea	Desert nightsnake	No	Dipsadidae	
	Hypsiglena jani	Chihuahuan nightsnake	No	Dipsadidae	
	Indotyphlops braminus	Brahmini blind snake	No	Typhlopidae	This is an invasive species to Arizona.
	Lampropeltis californiae	California kingsnake	No	Colubridae	
	Lampropeltis gentilis	Western milk snake	No	Colubridae	
	Lampropeltis knoblochi	Chihuahuan mountain kingsnake	No	Colubridae	
	Lampropeltis pyromelana	Arizona mountain kingsnake	No	Colubridae	
	Lampropeltis splendida	Desert kingsnake	No	Colubridae	
	Lichanura orcutti	Coastal rosy boa	No	Boidae	
	Lichanura trivirgata	Desert rosy boa	No	Boidae	
	Masticophis bilineatus	Sonoran whipsnake	No	Colubridae	
	Masticophis flagellum	Coachwhip	No	Colubridae	
	Masticophis mentovarius	Neotropical Whipsnake	No	Colubridae	
	Masticophis taeniatus	Striped whipsnake	No	Colubridae	
	Micruroides euryxanthus	Sonoran coral snake	Yes	Dipsadidae	
	Oxybelis microphthalmus	Thornscrub vine snake	No	Colubridae	
	Pituophis catenifer affinis	Sonoran gopher snake	No	Colubridae	
	Phyllorhynchus browni	Saddled leafnose snake	No	Colubridae	
	Phyllorhynchus decurtatus	Spotted leafnose snake	No	Colubridae	
	Rena dulcis	Texas threadsnake	No	Leptotyphlopidae	
	Rena humilis	Western threadsnake	No	Leptotyphlopidae	
	Rhinocheilus lecontei	Long-nosed snake	No	Colubridae	Often only black and white.
	Salvadora deserticola	Big Bend patch-nosed snake	No	Colubridae	
	Salvadora grahamiae	Eastern patch-nosed snake	No	Colubridae	
	Salvadora hexilepis	Western patch-nosed snake	No	Colubridae	
	Senticolis triaspis	Green rat snake	No	Colubridae	
	Sistrurus tergeminus	Western massasauga	Yes	Viperidae	
	Sonora annulata	Colorado Desert shovelnose snake	No	Colubridae	Often lacks red bands.
	Sonora cincta	Banded sand snake	No	Colubridae	
	Sonora occipitalis	Western shovelnose snake	No	Colubridae	
	Sonora palarostris	Sonoran shovel-nosed snake	No	Colubridae	
	Sonora semiannulata	Western ground snake	No	Colubridae	Extremely variable appearance.
	Sonora Straminea	Variable Sandsnake	No	Colubridae	
	Tantilla hobartsmithi	Southwestern blackhead snake	No	Colubridae	
	Tantilla nigriceps	Plains black-headed snake	No	Colubridae	
	Tantilla wilcoxi	Chihuahuan black-headed snake	No	Colubridae	
	Tantilla yaquia	Yaqui black-headed snake	No	Colubridae	
	Trimorphodon lambda	Sonoran lyre snake	No	Colubridae	
	Thamnophis cyrtopsis	Blackneck garter snake	No	Natricidae	
	Thamnophis elegans	Western terrestrial Garter snake	No	Natricidae	
	Thamnophis eques	Mexican garter snake	No	Natricidae	
	Thamnophis marcianus	Checkered garter snake	No	Natricidae	
	Thamnophis rufipunctatus	Narrowhead garter snake	No	Natricidae	
