= List of reptiles of Arizona =

This is a list of the known extant reptiles of Arizona. The Arizona state reptile is the Arizona ridge-nosed rattlesnake (Crotalus willardi willardi).

== Turtles and tortoises ==
=== Snapping turtles (Chelydridae) ===
- Common snapping turtle (Chelydra serpentina) - introduced

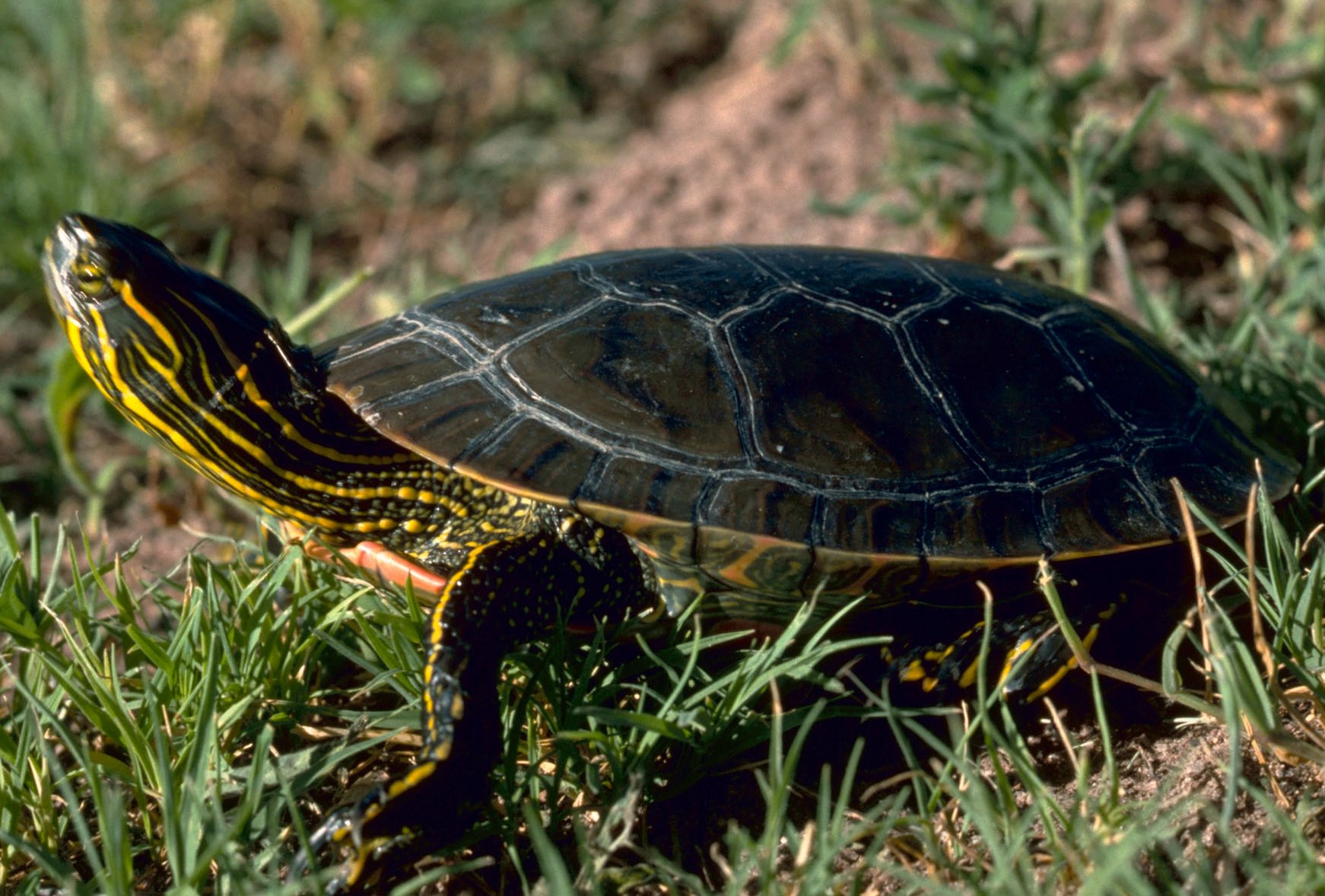
Western painted turtle

=== Pond turtles (Emydidae) ===
- Painted turtle (Chrysemys picta)
- Desert box turtle (Terrapene ornata luteola)
- Red-eared slider (Trachemys scripta elegans) - introduced
- False map turtle (Graptemys pseudogeographica) - introduced

=== Mud turtles (Kinosternidae) ===
- Arizona mud turtle (Kinosternon stejnegeri)
- Yellow mud turtle (Kinosternon flavescens)
- Sonora mud turtle (Kinosternon sonoriense)

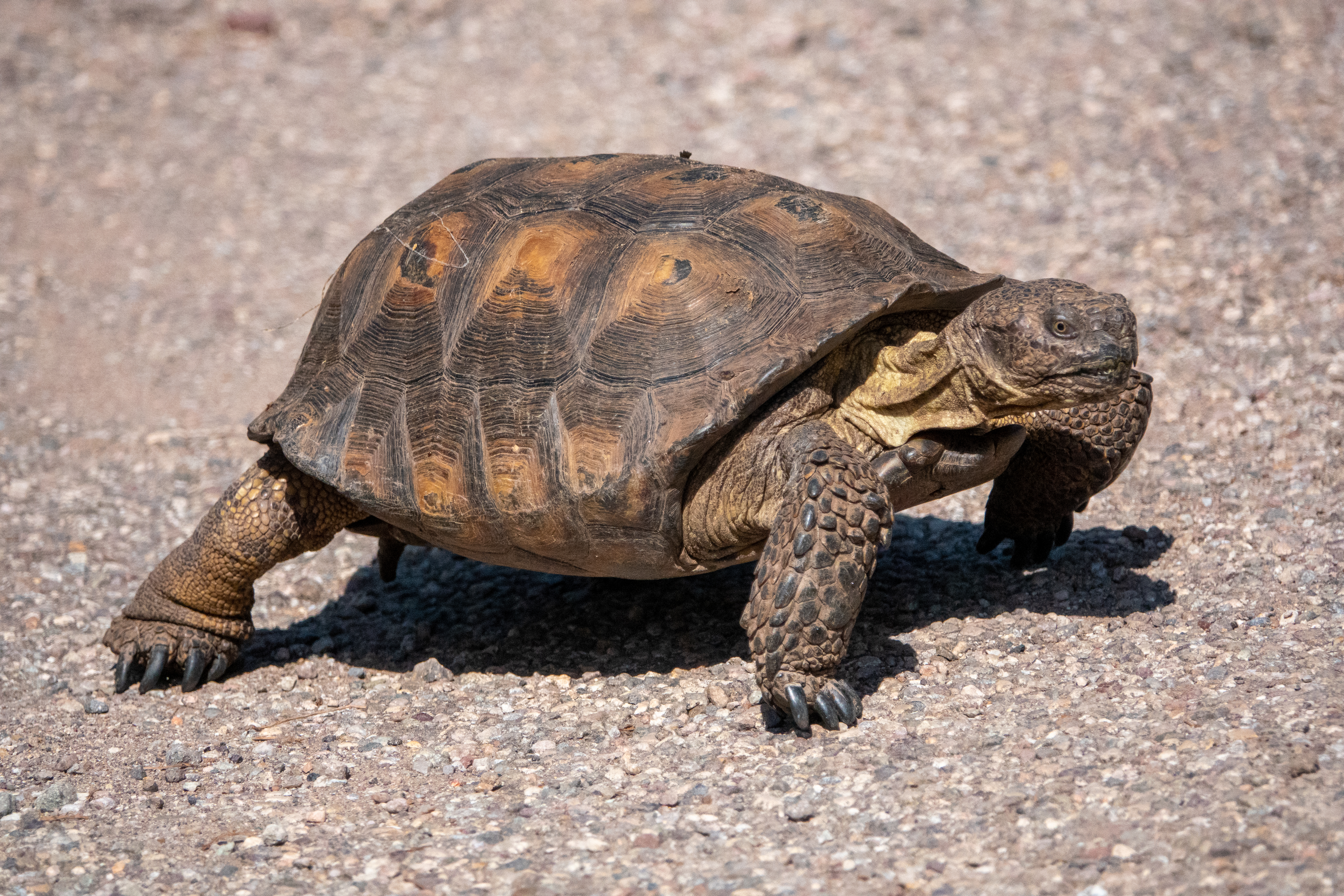
Sonoran Desert tortoise

=== Tortoises (Testudinidae) ===
- Desert tortoise (Gopherus agassizii)
- Sonoran Desert tortoise (Gopherus morafkai)

=== Softshell turtles (Trionychidae) ===
- Spiny softshell turtle (Apalone spinifera)

== Lizards ==
=== Alligator lizards and glass lizards (Anguidae) ===
- Madrean alligator lizard (Elgaria kingii)

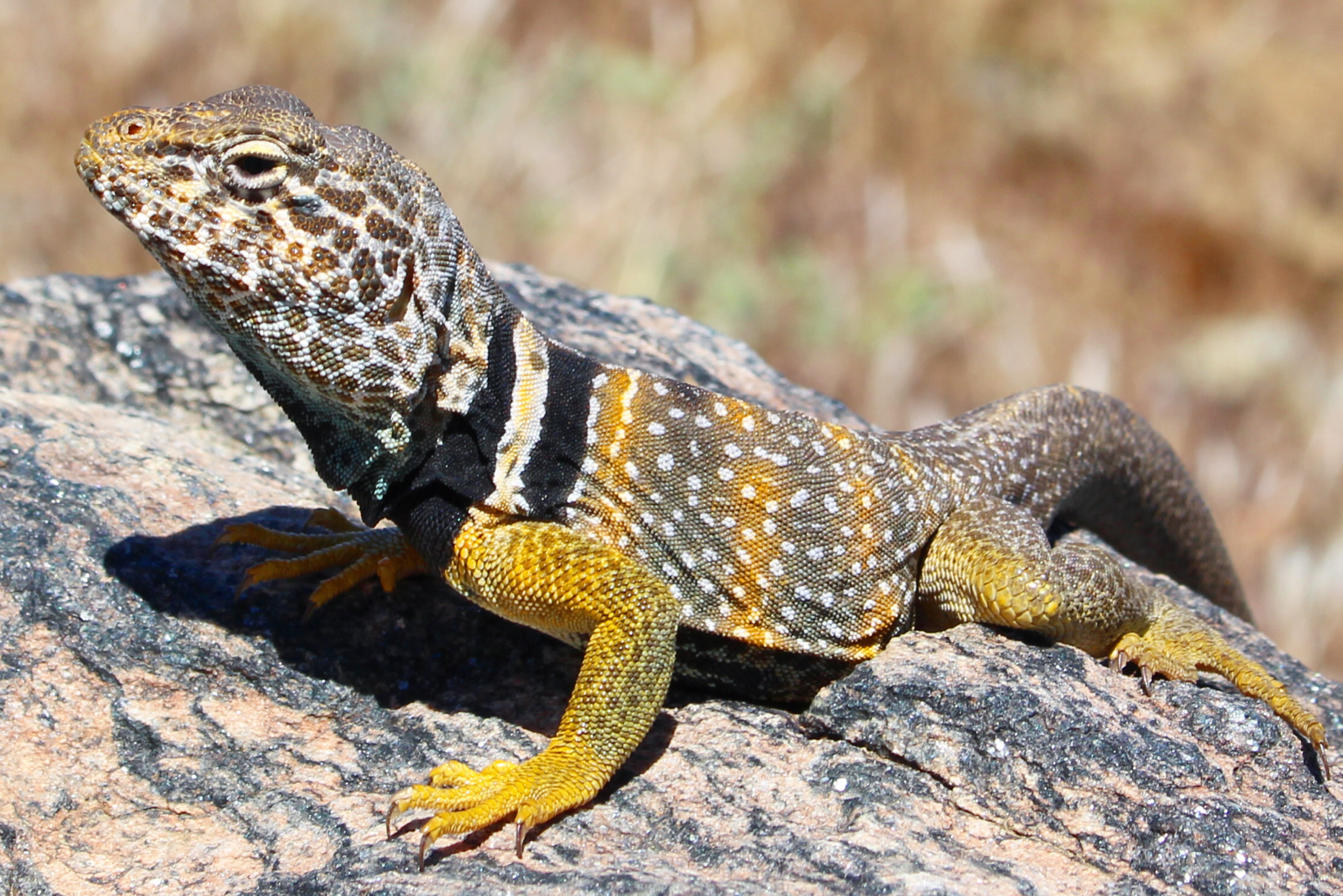
Great Basin collared lizard

=== Collared lizards (Crotaphytidae) ===
- Eastern collared lizard (Crotaphytus collaris)
- Great Basin collared lizard (Crotaphytus bicinctores)
- Sonoran collared lizard (Crotaphytus nebrius)
- Long-nosed leopard lizard (Gambelia wislizenii)

=== Desert geckos (Eublepharidae) ===
- Western banded gecko (Coleonyx variegatus)

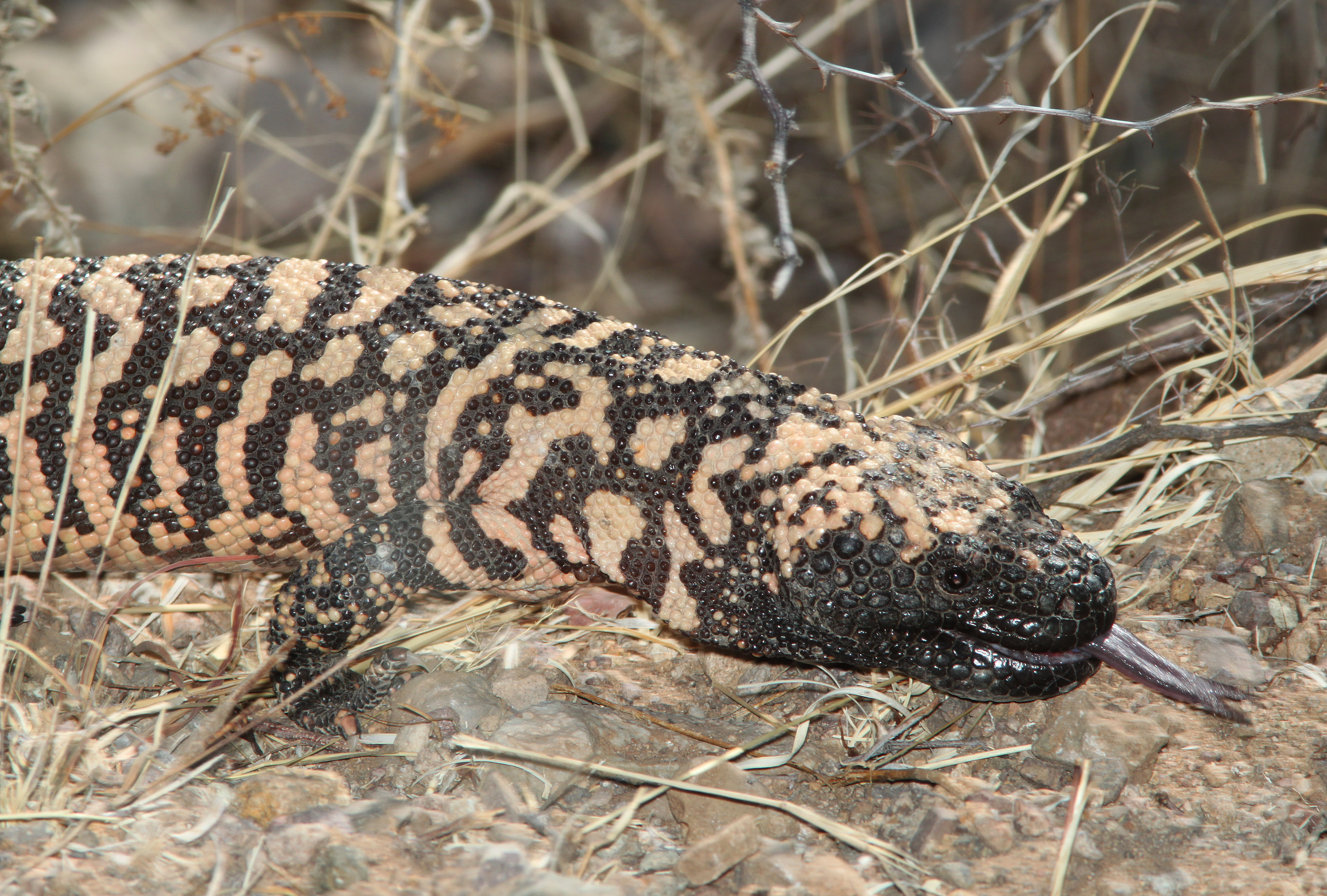
Reticulate Gila monster

=== Typical geckos (Gekkonidae) ===
- Mediterranean house gecko (Hemidactylus turcicus) - introduced
- Keeled rock gecko (Cyrtopodiun scabrum) - introduced

=== Beaded lizards (Helodermatidae) ===
- Gila monster (Heloderma suspectum)

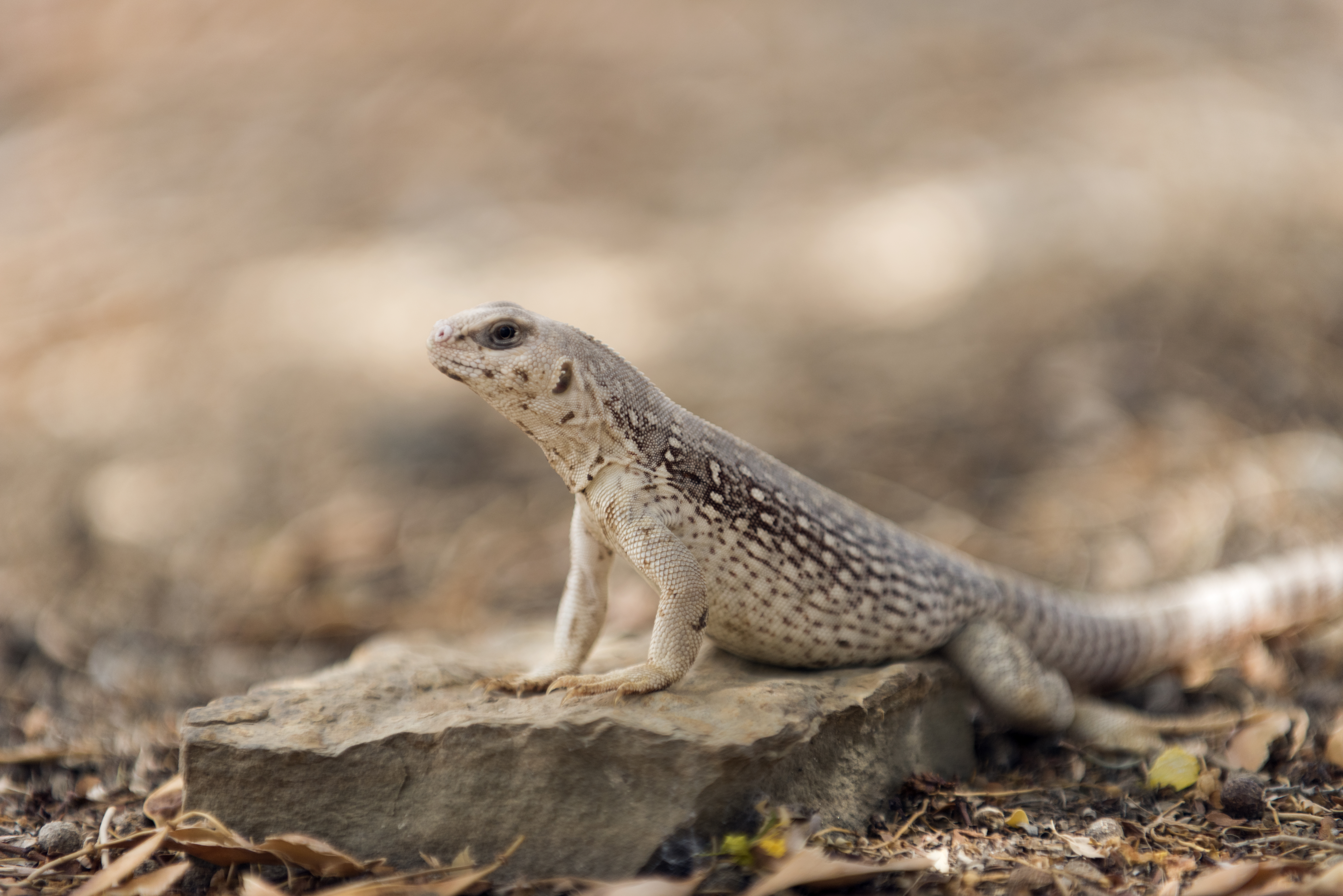
Desert iguana

=== Typical Iguanas (Iguanidae) ===
- Spiny-tailed iguana (Ctenosaura macrolopha × conspicuosa) - introduced
- Desert iguana (Dipsosaurus dorsalis)
- Common chuckwalla (Sauromalus ater)

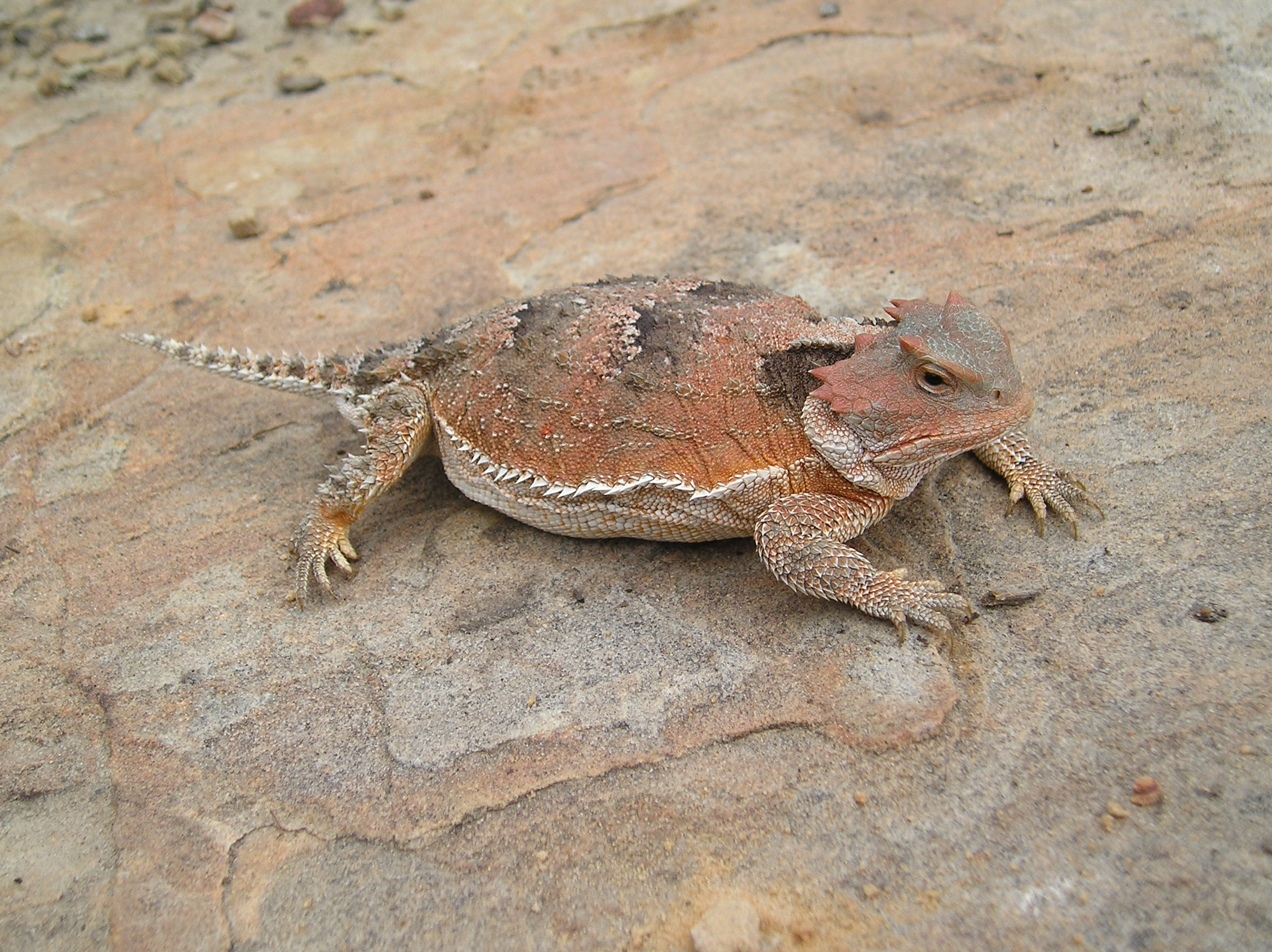
Greater short-horned lizard

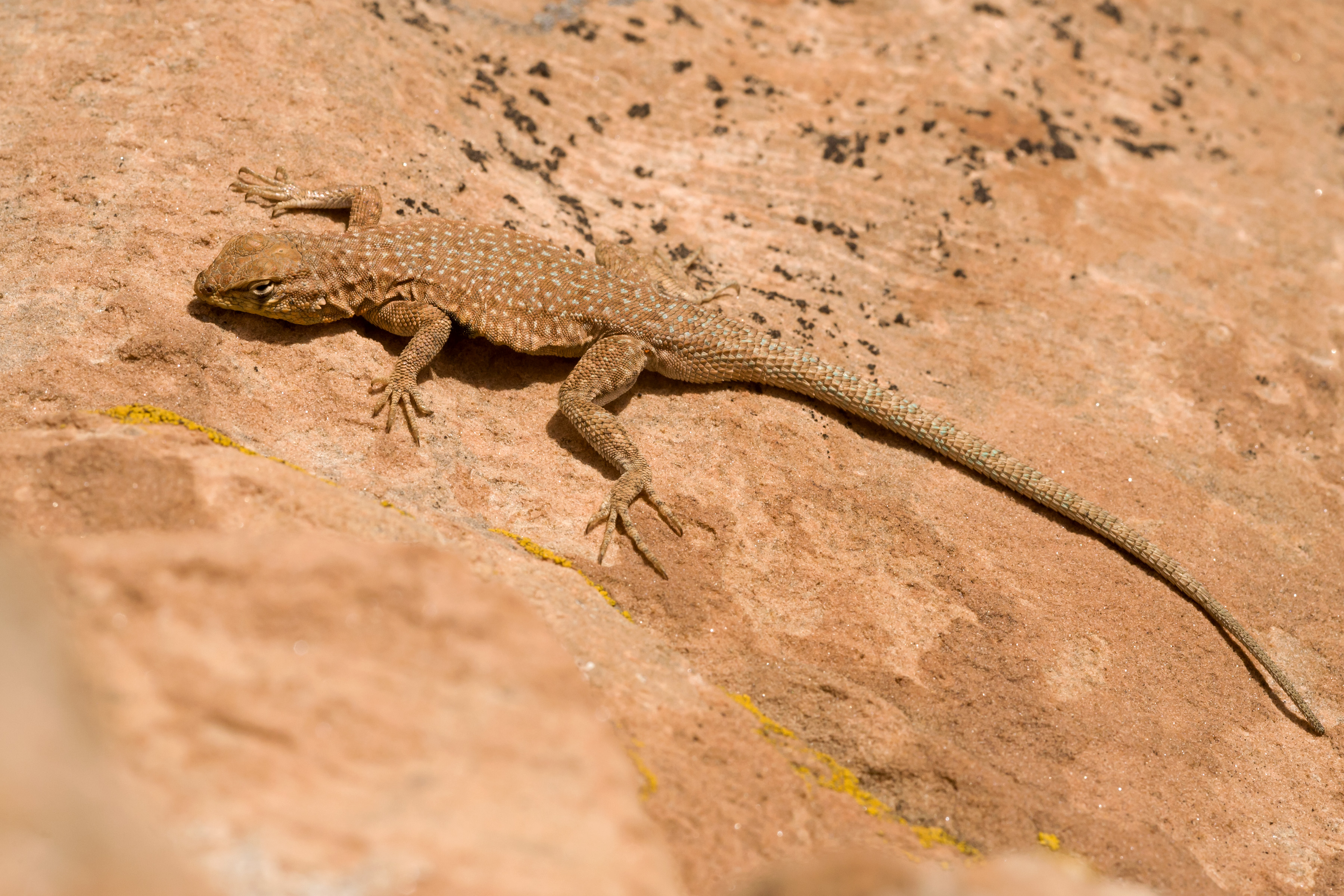
Common side-blotched lizard

=== Desert lizards (Phrynosomatidae) ===
- Zebra-tailed lizard (Callisaurus draconoides)
- Greater earless lizard (Cophosaurus texanus)
- Lesser earless lizard (Holbrookia maculata)
- Texas horned lizard (Phrynosoma cornutum)
- Greater short-horned lizard (Phrynosoma hernandesi)
- Flat-tail horned lizard (Phrynosoma mcallii)
- Desert horned lizard (Phrynosoma platyrhinos)
- Regal horned lizard (Phrynosoma solare)
- Twin-spotted spiny lizard (Sceloporus bimaculosus)
- Clark's spiny lizard (Sceloporus clarkii)
- Southwestern fence lizard (Sceloporus cowlesi)
- Yarrow's spiny lizard (Sceloporus jarrovii)
- Desert spiny lizard (Sceloporus magister)
- Slevin's bunchgrass lizard (Sceloporus slevini)
- Plateau fence lizard (Sceloporus tristichus)
- Yellow-backed spiny lizard (Sceloporus uniformis)
- Striped plateau lizard (Sceloporus virgatus)
- Mojave fringe-toed lizard (Uma scoparia)
- Long-tailed brush lizard (Urosaurus graciosus)
- Ornate tree lizard (Urosaurus ornatus)
- Common side-blotched lizard (Uta stansburiana)

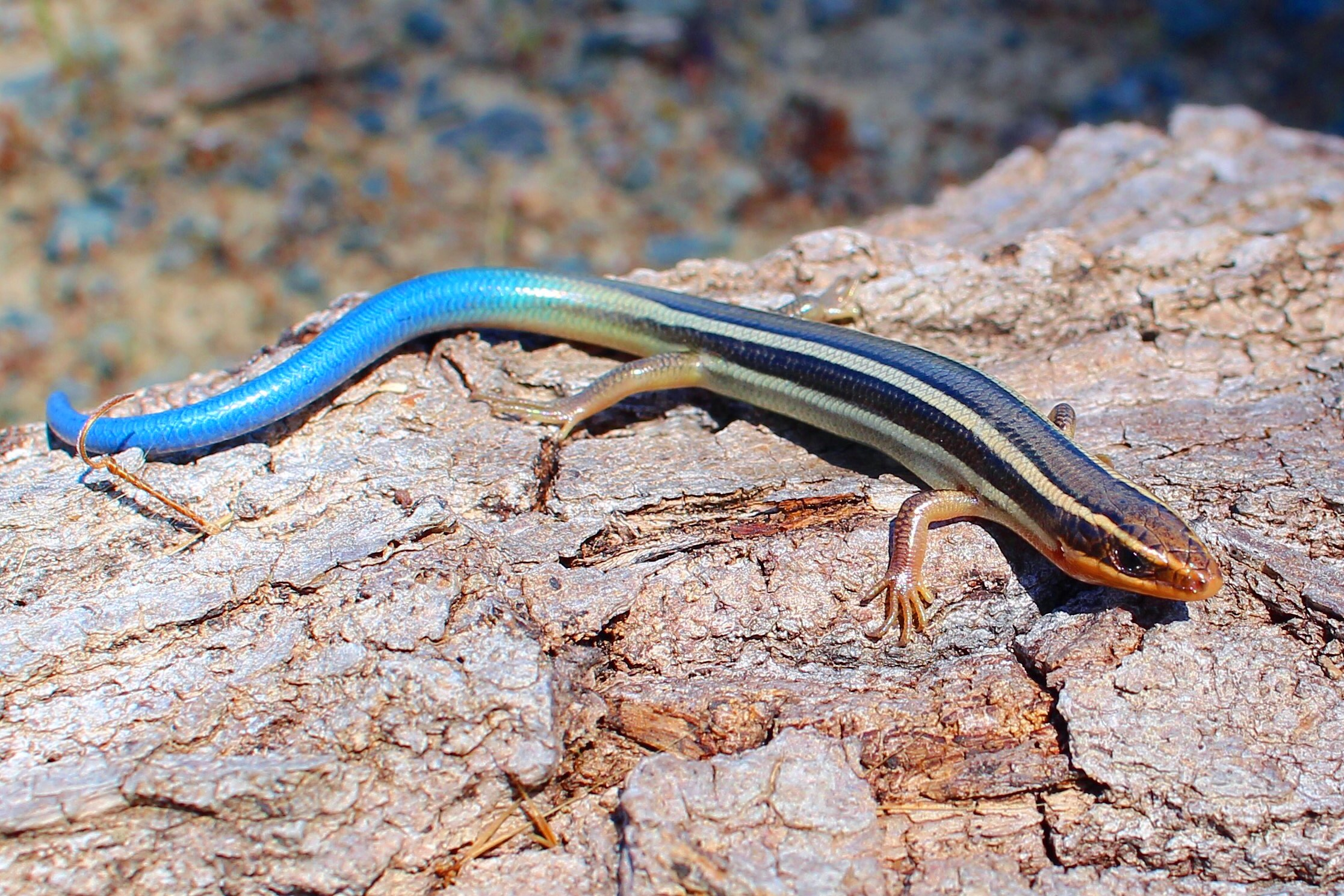
Western skink

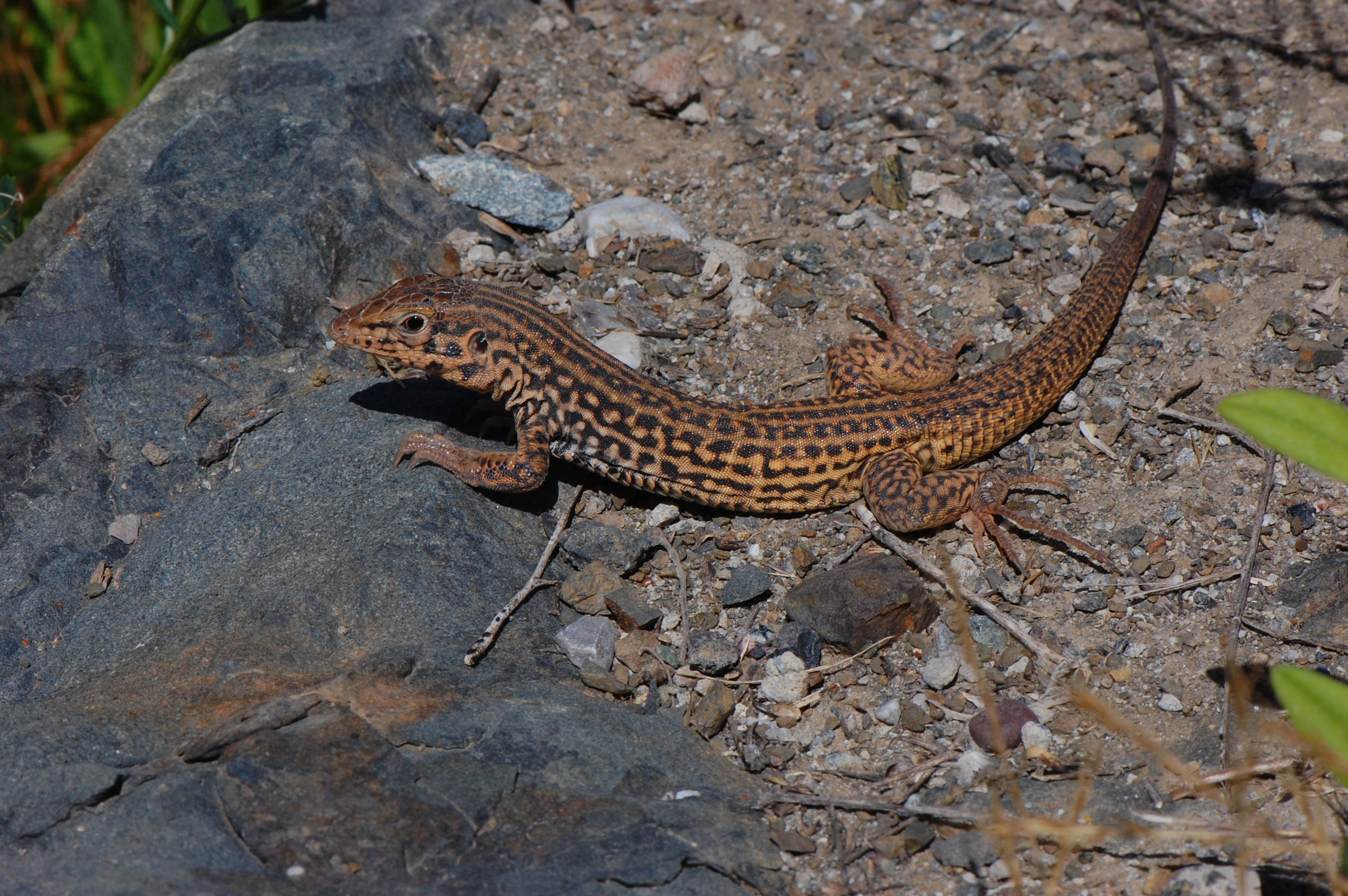
Tiger whiptail

=== Skinks (Scincidae) ===
- Mountain skink (Plestiodon callicephalus)
- Gilbert's skink (Plestiodon gilberti)
- Many-lined skink (Plestiodon multivirgatus)
- Western skink (Plestiodon skiltonianus)
- Great Plains skink (Plestiodon obsoletus)

=== Whiptails (Teiidae) ===
- Arizona striped whiptail (Aspidoscelis arizonae)
- Canyon spotted whiptail (Aspidoscelis burti)
- Chihuahuan spotted whiptail (Aspidoscelis exsanguis)
- Gila spotted whiptail (Aspidoscelis flagellicauda)
- New Mexico whiptail (Aspidoscelis neomexicana)
- Pai striped whiptail (Aspidoscelis pai)
- Sonoran spotted whiptail (Aspidoscelis sonorae)
- Tiger whiptail (Aspidoscelis tigris)
- Desert grassland whiptail (Aspidoscelis uniparens)
- Plateau striped whiptail (Aspidoscelis velox)
- Red-backed whiptail (Aspidoscelis xanthonota)

=== Night lizards (Xantusiidae) ===
- Arizona night lizard (Xantusia arizona)
- Bezy's night lizard (Xantusia bezyi)
- Desert night lizard (Xantusia vigilis)

== Snakes ==
=== Boas (Boidae) ===
- Desert rosy boa (Lichanura trivirgata)

=== Colubrids (Colubridae) ===
- Glossy snake (Arizona elegans)
- Variable sandsnake (Sonora stramineus)
- Western shovelnose snake (Sonora occipitalis)
- Groundsnake (Sonora semiannulata)
- Sonoran shovel-nosed snake (Sonora palarostris)
- North American racer (Coluber constrictor)
- Coachwhip (Masticophis flagellum)
- Striped whipsnake (Masticophis taeniatus)
- Ring-necked snake (Diadophis punctatus)
- Chihuahuan hook-nosed snake (Gyalopion canum)
- Thornscrub hook-nosed snake (Gyalopion quadrangulare)
- Mexican hog-nosed snake (Heterodon kennerlyi)
- Desert nightsnake (Hypsiglena chlorophaea)
- Chihuahuan nightsnake (Hypsiglena jani)
- Common kingsnake (Lampropeltis getula)
- Sonoran mountain kingsnake (Lampropeltis pyromelana)
- Milk snake (Lampropeltis triangulum)
- Brown vinesnake (Oxybelis aeneus)
- Saddled leaf-nosed snake (Phyllorhynchus browni)
- Spotted leaf-nosed snake (Phyllorhynchus decurtatus)
- Gopher snake (Pituophis catenifer)
- Long-nosed snake (Rhinocheilus lecontei)
- Western patch-nosed snake (Salvadora hexalepis
- Eastern patch-nosed snake (Salvadora grahamiae)
- Green ratsnake (Senticolis triaspis)
- Sonoran lyresnake (Trimorphodon lambda)
- Smith's black-headed snake (Tantilla hobartsmithi)
- Plains black-headed snake (Tantilla nigriceps)
- Chihuahuan black-headed snake (Tantilla wilcoxi)
- Yaqui black-headed snake (Tantilla yaquia)
- Blackneck garter snake (Thamnophis cyrtopsis)
- Western terrestrial garter snake (Thamnophis elegans)
- Mexican garter snake (Thamnophis eques)
- Checkered garter snake (Thamnophis marcianus)
- Narrow-headed garter snake (Thamnophis rufipunctatus)

=== Coral snakes (Elapidae) ===
- Arizona coral snake (Micruroides euryxanthus)

=== Threadsnakes (Leptotyphlopidae) ===
- New Mexico threadsnake (Rena dissecta)
- Western threadsnake (Rena humilis)

=== Vipers (Viperidae) ===
- Sidewinder (Crotalus cerastes)
- Western diamondback rattlesnake (Crotalus atrox)
- Arizona black rattlesnake (Crotalus cerberus)
- Rock rattlesnake (Crotalus lepidus)
- Speckled rattlesnake (Crotalus mitchellii)
- Black-tailed rattlesnake (Crotalus molossus)
- Western rattlesnake (Crotalus oreganus)
- Mohave rattlesnake (Crotalus scutulatus)
- Tiger rattlesnake (Crotalus tigris)
- Prairie rattlesnake (Crotalus viridis)
- Ridge-nosed rattlesnake (Crotalus willardi)
- Western massasauga (Sistrurus tergeminus)
