= Banded sand snake =

There are two species of snake named banded sand snake:

- Sonora fasciata
- Sonora straminea
