= Michoacán ground snake =

There are two species of snake named Michoacán ground snake:

- Sonora michoacanensis
- Sonora mutabilis
