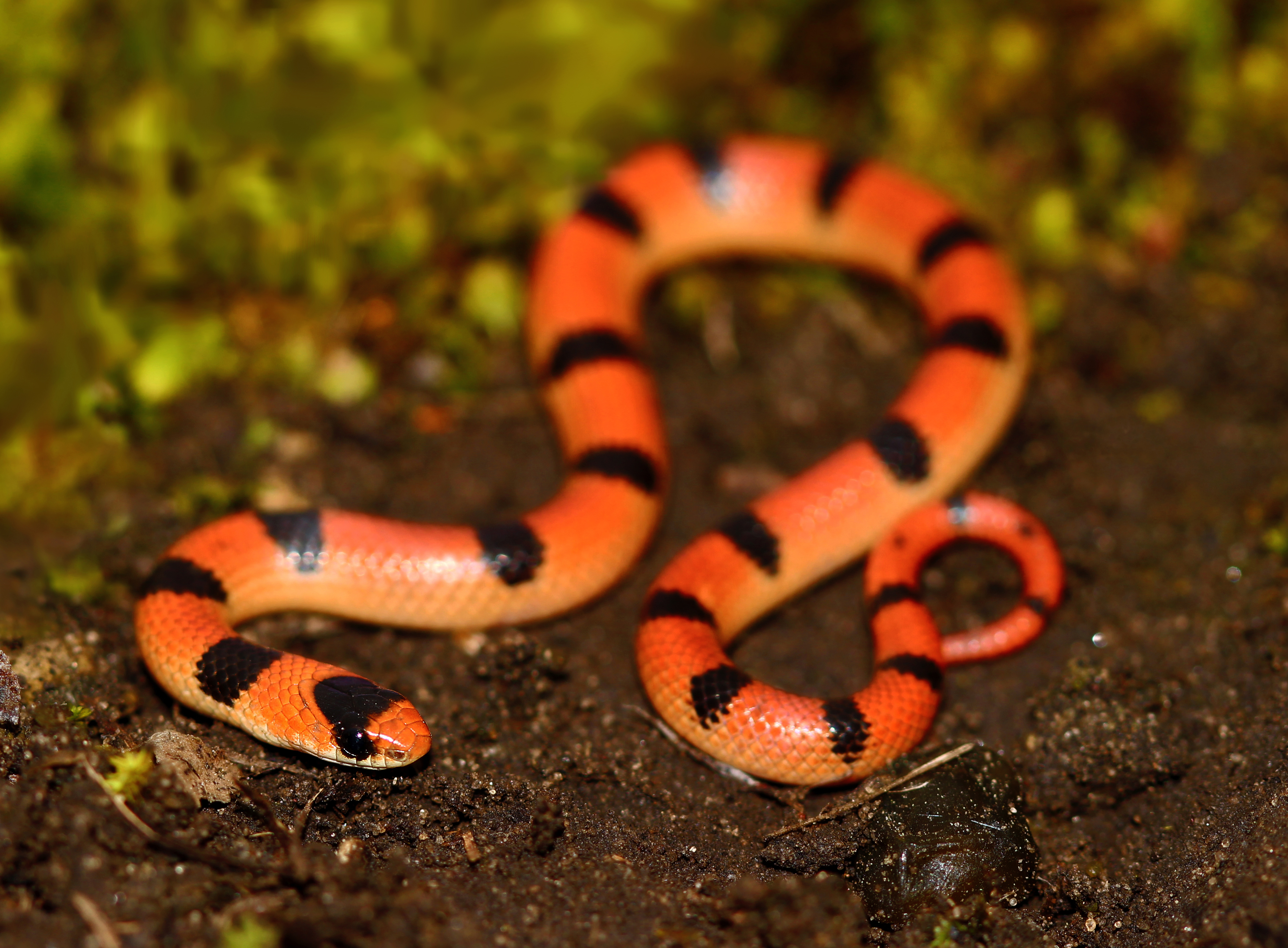

Scientific classification
- Kingdom: Animalia
- Phylum: Chordata
- Class: Reptilia
- Order: Squamata
- Suborder: Serpentes
- Family: Colubridae
- Genus: Sonora
- Species: S. episcopa

Binomial name
- Sonora episcopa (Kennicott, 1859)

= Sonora episcopa =

Species of snake

Sonora episcopa, the ground snake, is a species of snake of the family Colubridae.

The snake is found in the United States and Mexico.
