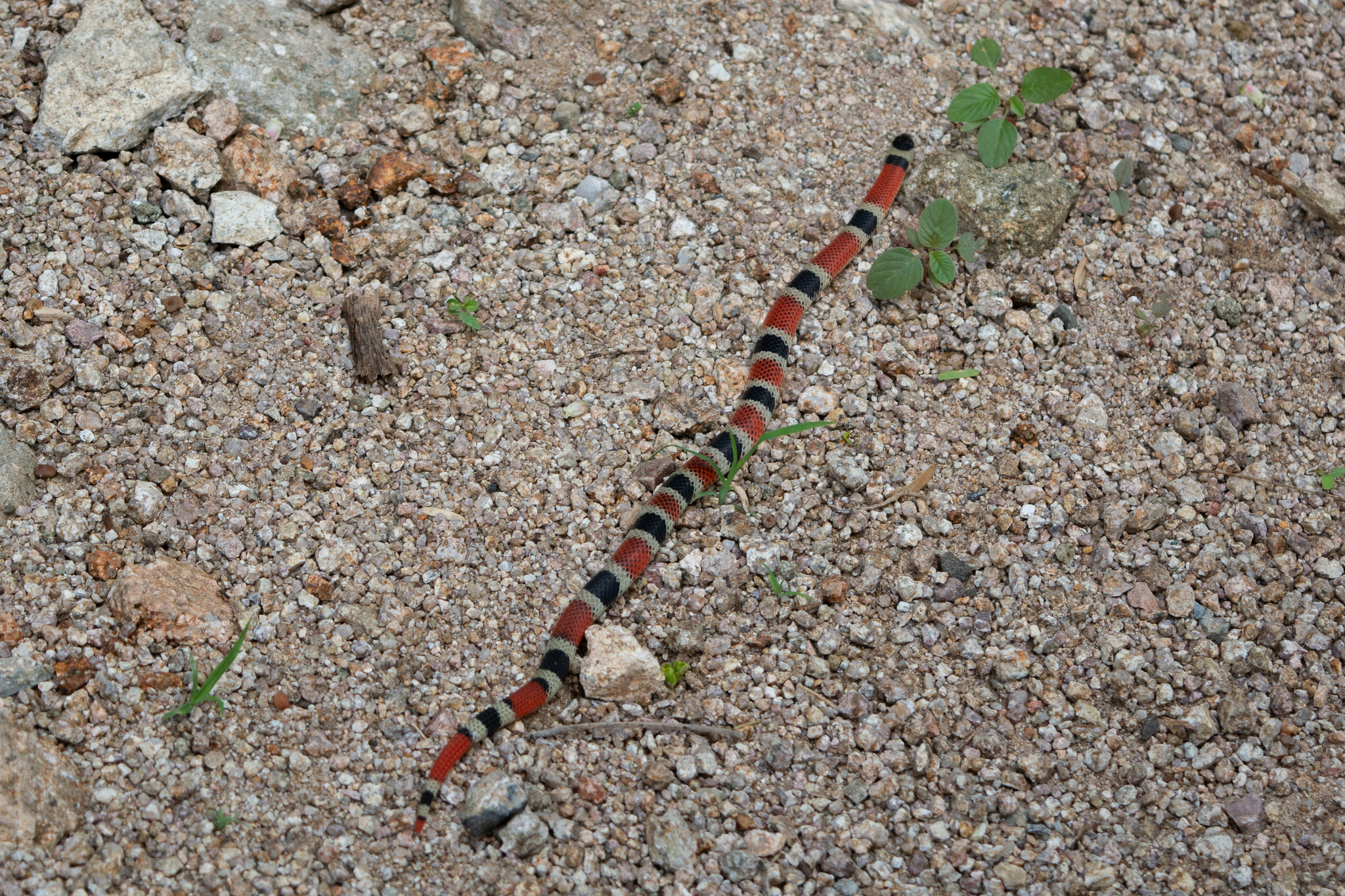

Conservation status
- Near Threatened (IUCN 3.1)

Scientific classification
- Kingdom: Animalia
- Phylum: Chordata
- Class: Reptilia
- Order: Squamata
- Suborder: Serpentes
- Family: Colubridae
- Genus: Sonora
- Species: S. aemula

Binomial name
- Sonora aemula (Cope, 1879)

= Sonora aemula =

Species of snake

Sonora aemula, the filetail ground snake, is a species of snake of the family Colubridae.

The snake is found in Mexico.
