= Hemidactylus klauberi =

Scientific classification
- Kingdom: Animalia
- Phylum: Chordata
- Class: Reptilia
- Order: Squamata
- Suborder: Gekkota
- Family: Gekkonidae
- Genus: Hemidactylus
- Species: H. klauberi

Binomial name
- Hemidactylus klauberi Scortecci, 1948

Species of lizard

Hemidactylus klauberi is a species of gecko, a lizard in the family Gekkonidae. The species is endemic to Somalia.

== Etymology ==
The specific name, klauberi, is in honor of American herpetologist Laurence Monroe Klauber.

== Reproduction ==
H. klauberi is oviparous.
