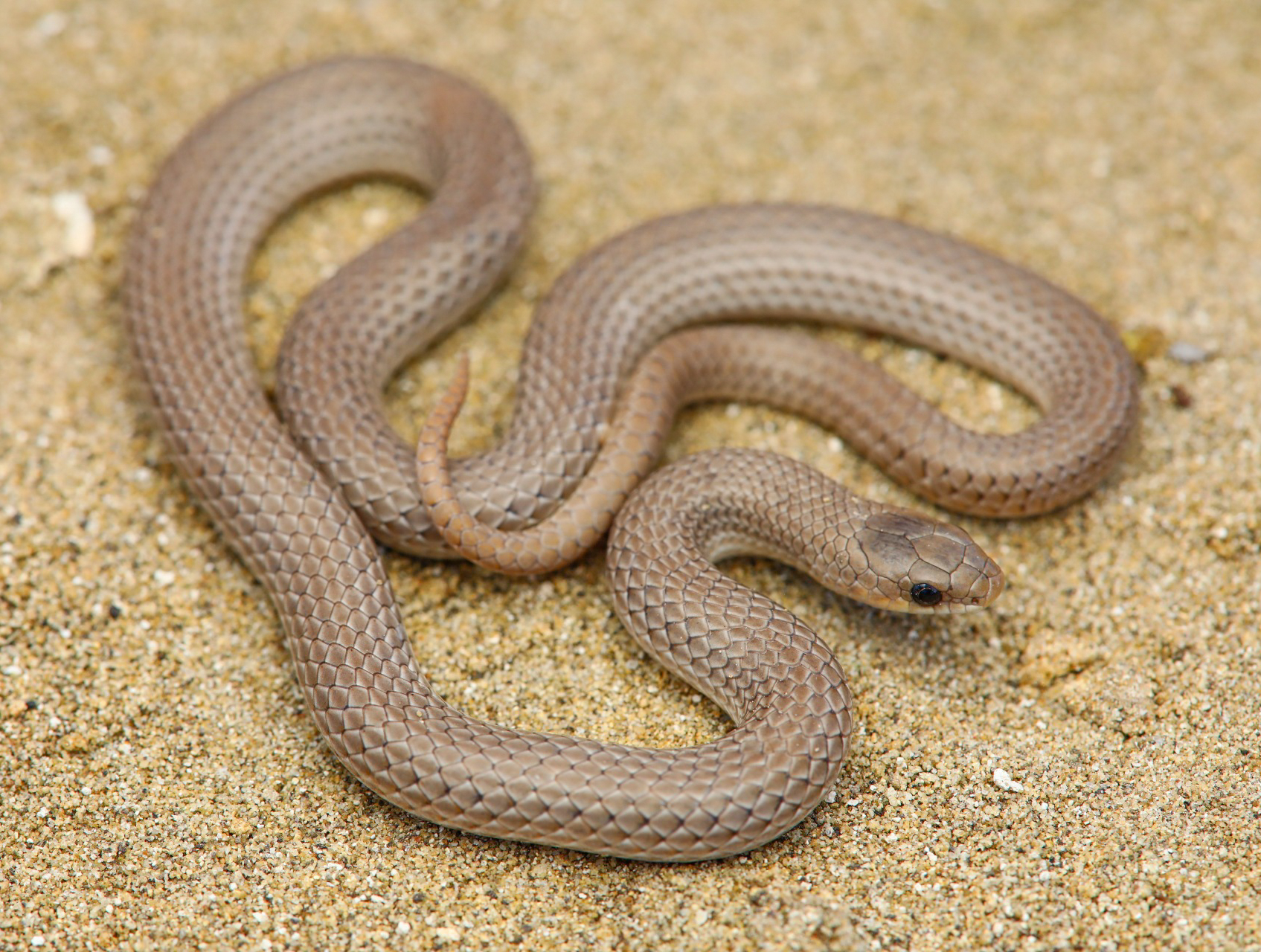

Scientific classification
- Kingdom: Animalia
- Phylum: Chordata
- Class: Reptilia
- Order: Squamata
- Suborder: Serpentes
- Family: Colubridae
- Genus: Sonora
- Species: S. taylori

Binomial name
- Sonora taylori (Boulenger, 1894)

Synonyms
- Contia taylori Boulenger, 1894; Chionactis taylorii (Boulenger, 1894); Sonora episcopa taylori (Boulenger, 1894); Sonora semiannulata taylori (Boulenger, 1894)

= Sonora taylori =

Species of snake

Sonora taylori, also known commonly as Taylor's ground snake, the southern Texas ground snake, and la culebrilla de Taylor in Mexican Spanish, is a species of snake in the subfamily Colubrinae of the family Colubridae. The species is native to the southwestern United States and adjacent northeastern Mexico.

== Etymology ==
The specific name, taylori, is in honor of a "W. Taylor". To whom this abbreviation refers is unclear. It may refer to Walter Edgar Taylor, who was an American ornithologist and herpetologist, or it may refer to a William Taylor of the British Museum.

== Description ==
Unlike other members of its genus, S. taylori has no modifications to its rostral, nor to its tail. It has 13 rows of dorsal scales at midbody. Dorsally, it is brown, with each scale having a darker center. Ventrally, it is white, including the lips. It has a low number of ventrals: 126–139 for males, 136–148 for females. Adults have a total length (including tail) of 10–16 in (25–41 cm).

== Geographic range ==
S. taylori is found in southern Texas and in the Mexican state of Tamaulipas.

== Reproduction ==
S. taylori is oviparous. Clutch size is about six eggs. Each egg measures about 20 mm × 6 mm (0.79 in × 0.24 in).
