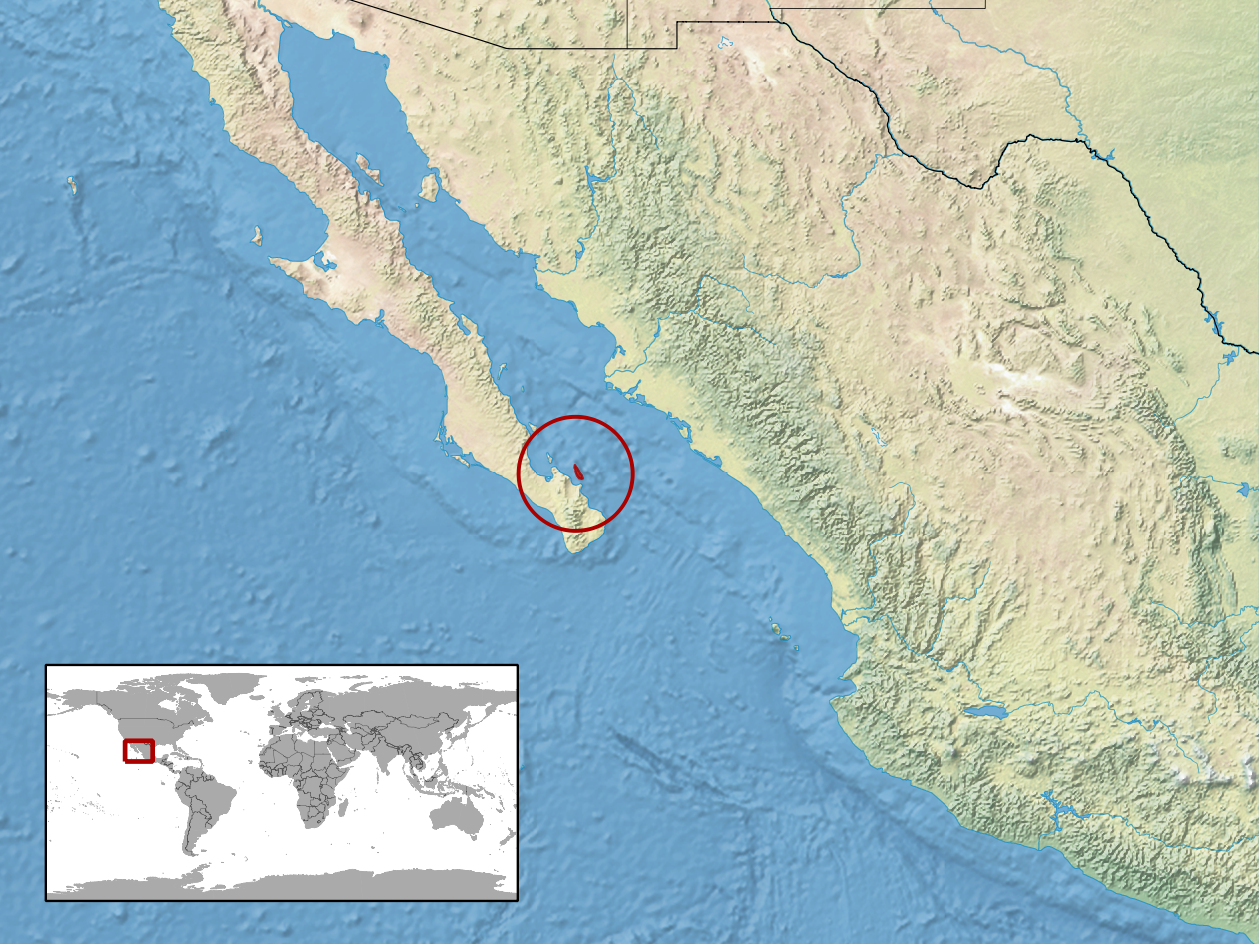
- Distribution of Sonora savagei

Conservation status
- Least Concern (IUCN 3.1)

Scientific classification
- Kingdom: Animalia
- Phylum: Chordata
- Class: Reptilia
- Order: Squamata
- Suborder: Serpentes
- Family: Colubridae
- Genus: Sonora
- Species: S. savagei

Binomial name
- Sonora savagei (Cliff, 1954)

Synonyms
- Chilomeniscus savagei Cliff, 1954

= Sonora savagei =

Species of snake

Sonora savagei, also known commonly as Savage's ground snake, Savage's sand snake, and arenera de Isla Cerralvo in Mexican Spanish, is a species of snake in the subfamily Colubrinae of the family Colubridae. The species is endemic to Jacques Cousteau Island (formerly called Isla Cerralvo), Baja California Sur, Mexico.

== Etymology ==
The specific name, savagei, is in honor of American herpetologist Jay M. Savage.

== Description ==
The coloration of S. savagei consists of alternating dark and pale rings, with no dark spots within the pale rings.

== Habitat ==
The preferred natural habitat of S. savagei is dessert.

== Reproduction ==
S. savagei is oviparous.
