= Sonora mosaueri =

Scientific classification
- Kingdom: Animalia
- Phylum: Chordata
- Class: Reptilia
- Order: Squamata
- Suborder: Serpentes
- Family: Colubridae
- Genus: Sonora
- Species: S. mosaueri

Binomial name
- Sonora mosaueri Stickel, 1943

Species of snake

Sonora mosaueri, Mosauer's ground snake, is a species of snake of the family Colubridae.

The snake is found in Mexico.
