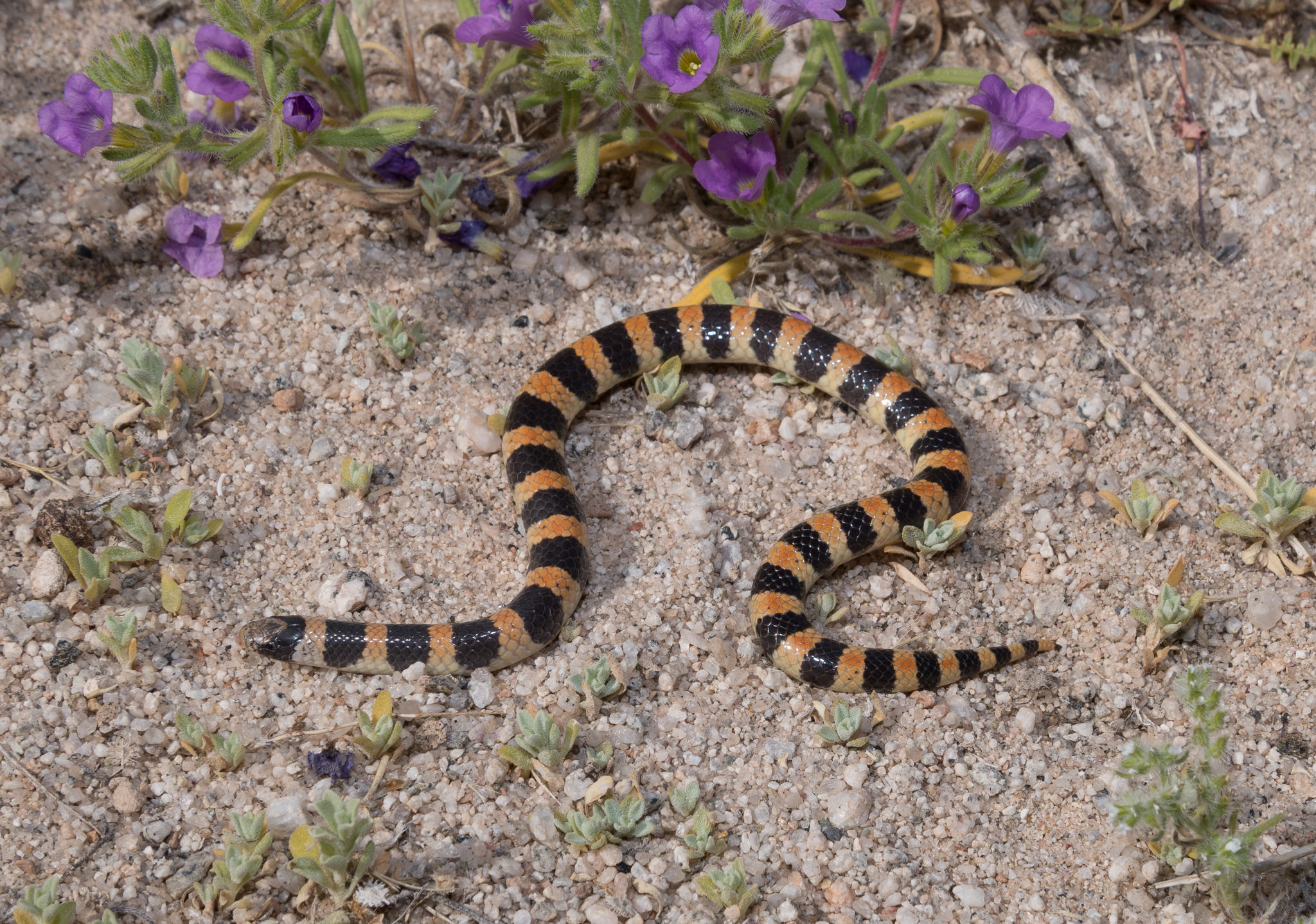

Scientific classification
- Kingdom: Animalia
- Phylum: Chordata
- Class: Reptilia
- Order: Squamata
- Suborder: Serpentes
- Family: Colubridae
- Genus: Sonora
- Species: S. cincta

Binomial name
- Sonora cincta (Cope, 1861)
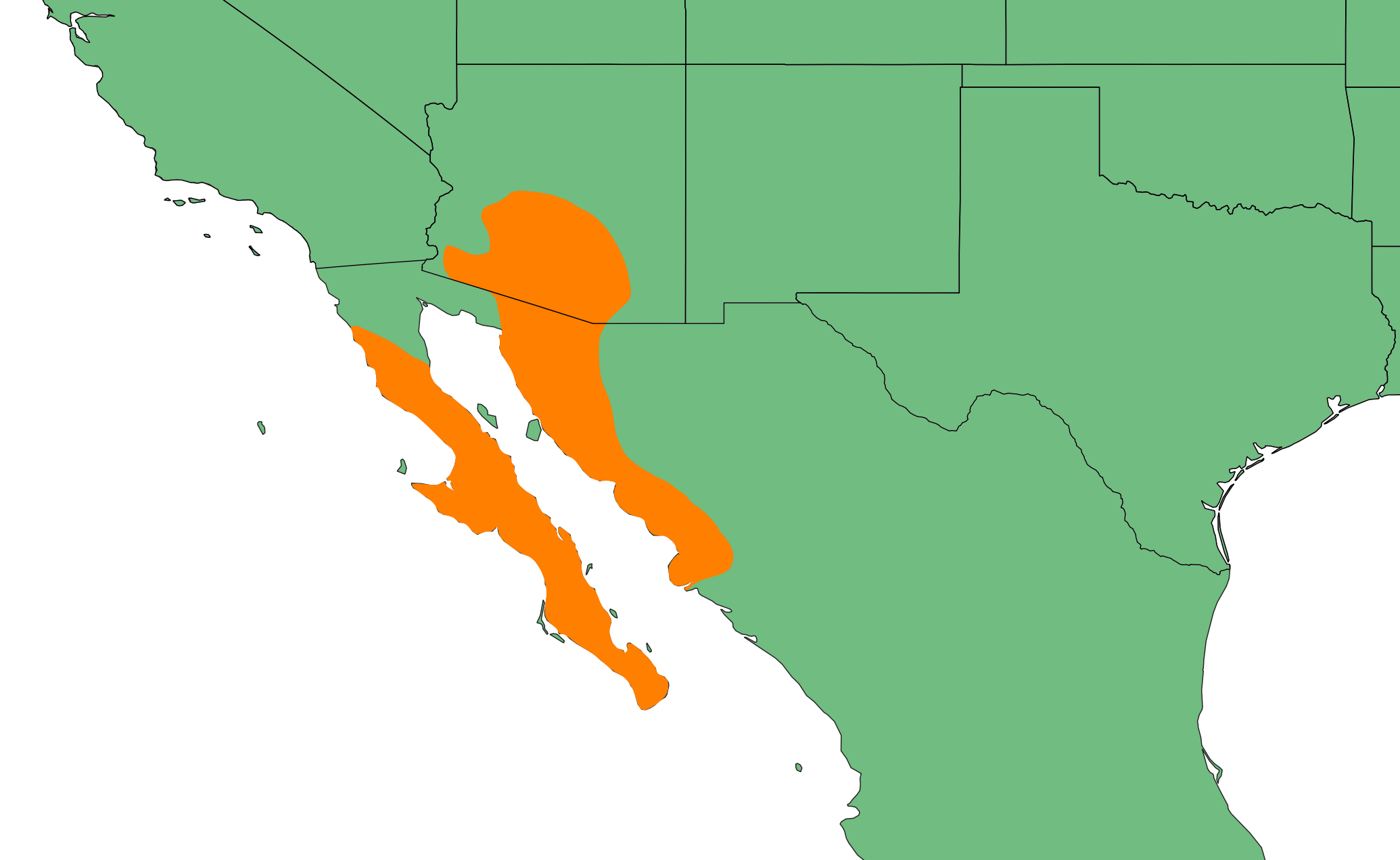

= Sonora cincta =

Species of snake

Sonora cincta is a species of snake of the family Colubridae.

The snake is found in the United States and Mexico.
