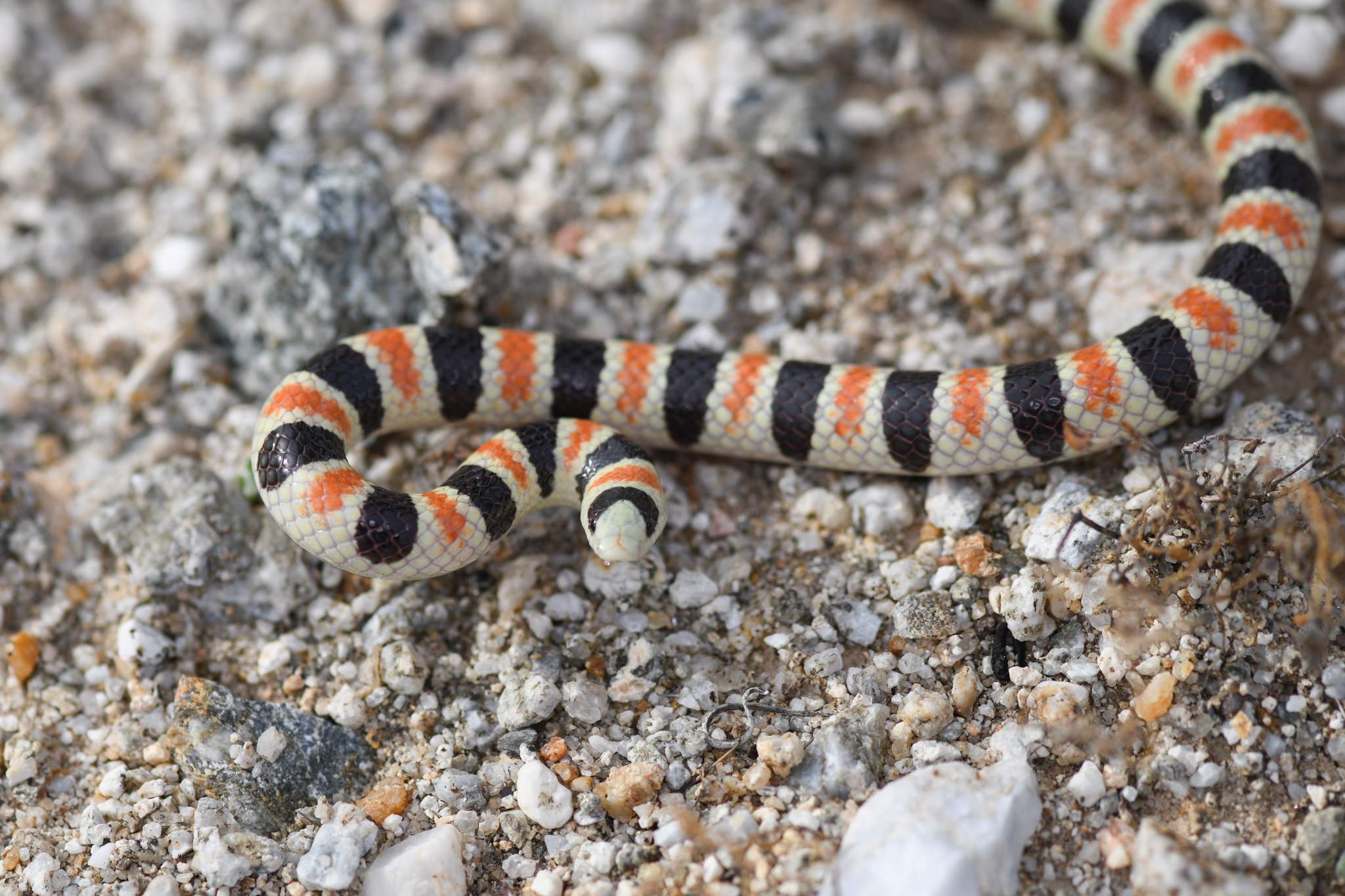
- San Diego County, California, 2024

Scientific classification
- Kingdom: Animalia
- Phylum: Chordata
- Class: Reptilia
- Order: Squamata
- Suborder: Serpentes
- Family: Colubridae
- Genus: Sonora
- Species: S. annulata

Binomial name
- Sonora annulata (Baird, 1859)
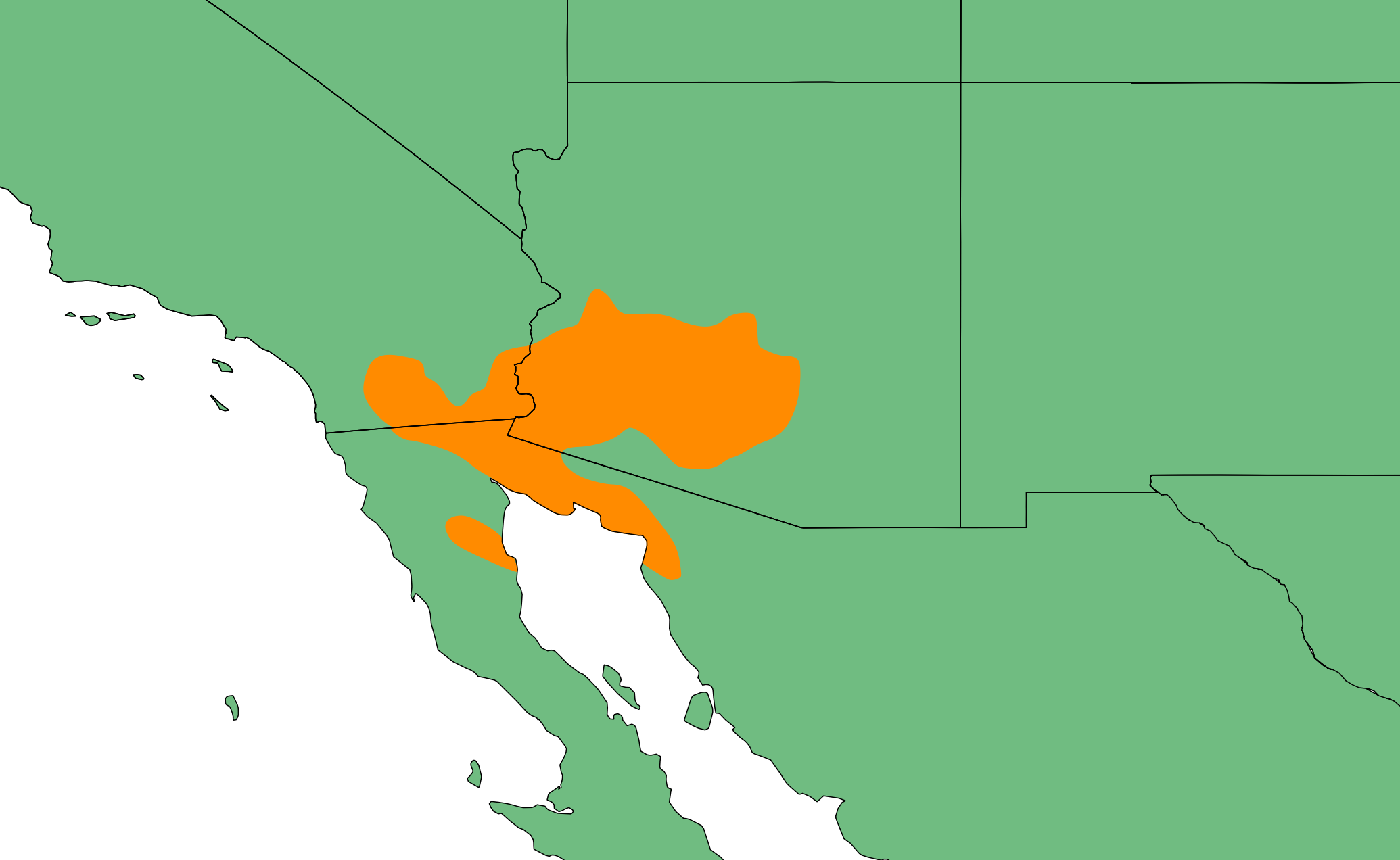

Synonyms
- Lamprosoma annulatum Baird, 1859; Chionactis annulata (Baird, 1859); Chionactis occipitalis annulata (Baird, 1859)

= Sonora annulata =

Species of snake

Sonora annulata, also known commonly as the Colorado Desert shovelnose snake, is a species of snake in the subfamily Colubrinae of the family Colubridae. The species is native to the southwestern United States and adjacent northwestern Mexico. There are two recognized subspecies.

== Geographic range ==
In the United States, S. annulata is found in southwestern Arizona and southeastern California. In Mexico it is found in northeastern Baja California.

== Diet ==
Sonora annulata preys upon insects, scorpions, and lizards.

== Subspecies ==
Two subspecies are recognized as being valid, including the nominotypical subspecies.

- Sonora annulata annulata (Baird, 1859)
- Sonora annulata klauberi Stickel, 1941 – Tucson shovel-nosed snake

Nota bene: A trinomial authority in parentheses indicates that the subspecies was originally described in a genus other than Sonora.

== Etymology ==
The subspecific name, klauberi, is in honor of American herpetologist Laurence Monroe Klauber.
