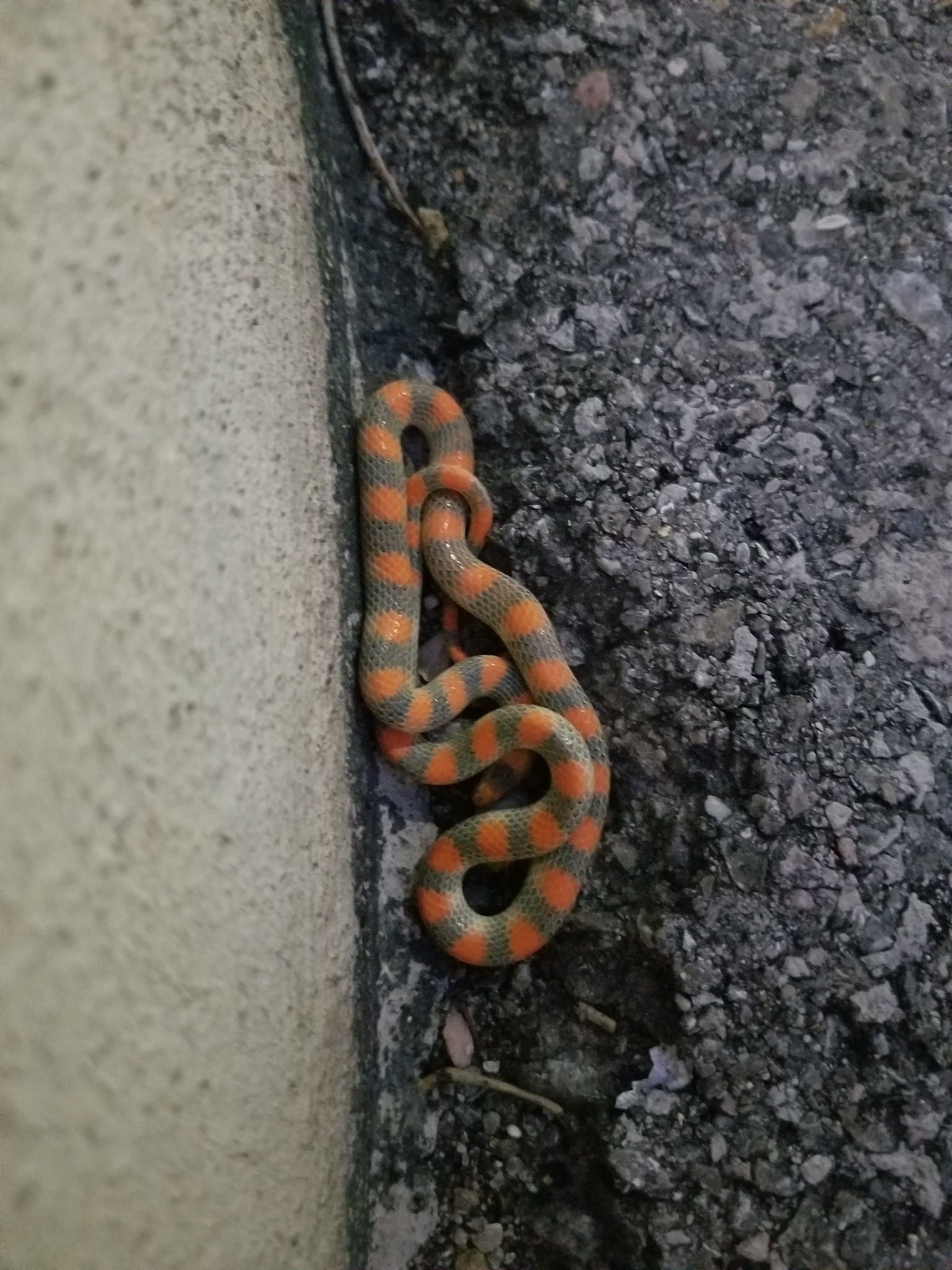
- Western ground snake (Sonora semiannulata)

Scientific classification
- Kingdom: Animalia
- Phylum: Chordata
- Class: Reptilia
- Order: Squamata
- Suborder: Serpentes
- Family: Colubridae
- Subfamily: Colubrinae
- Genus: Sonora; Baird & Girard, 1853

Type species
- Sonora semiannulata

Synonyms
- Chilomeniscus; Chionactis; Contia; Homalocranium; Homalosoma; Lamprosoma; Ogmius; Scolecophis

= Sonora (snake) =

Genus of snakes

Sonora is a genus of small harmless colubrid snakes commonly referred to as ground snakes, which are endemic to North America.

== Distribution and habitat ==
Species of the genus Sonora range through central and northern Mexico, and the southwestern United States.

They are sand dwellers.

== Species ==
Image	Scientific name	Common name	Distribution
	Sonora aemula (Cope, 1879)	filetail ground snake	
	Sonora annulata (Baird, 1859)	Colorado Desert shovelnose snake	SE California, Arizona, Baja California
	Sonora cincta (Cope, 1861)	Arizona ground snake, banded burrowing snake, horse snake, red and black ground snake, Sonora ringed snake	USA (S Arizona), Mexico (N Baja California Sur, W Sonora)
	Sonora episcopa (Kennicott, 1859)	ground snake	USA (Missouri, N Arkansas, Kansas, Oklahoma, Texas, SE Colorado, S/E New Mexico), Mexico (Coahuila)
	Sonora fasciata (Cope, 1892)	variable sand snake, banded sand snake	Mexico (Baja California)
	Sonora michoacanensis (Dugès, 1884)	Michoacán ground snake	Mexico (Colima, Guerrero, Michoacan; Morelos, Puebla)
	Sonora mosaueri Stickel, 1938	Mosauer's ground snake	Mexico (Baja California Sur)
	Sonora mutabilis Stickel, 1943	Michoacán ground snake	Mexico (Jalisco, Nayarit, Aguascalientes, southern Zacatecas, S Sinaloa)
	Sonora occipitalis (Hallowell, 1854)	western shovelnose snake	USA (SE California, S Nevada, SW Arizona), Mexico (Baja California Norte)
	Sonora palarostris Klauber, 1937	Sonoran shovelnose snake	USA (S Arizona), Mexico (Sonora)
	Sonora savagei Cliff, 1954	Savage's sand snake	Mexico (Baja California)
	Sonora semiannulata Baird & Girard, 1853	western ground snake	USA (W Texas, New Mexico, Arizona, Oklahoma, S Colorado, S Kansas, SW Missouri, SE Utah, California, Arkansas), Mexico (N Sonora, Chihuahua, Coahuila, Tamaulipas, NW Nuevo León, NE Durango)
	Sonora straminea (Cope, 1860)	variable sand snake	Mexico (S Baja California Sur, Sinaloa)
	Sonora taylori (Boulenger, 1894)	Taylor's ground snake	S Texas, adjacent Mexico

Nota bene: A binomial authority in parentheses indicates that the species was originally described in a genus other than Sonora.
