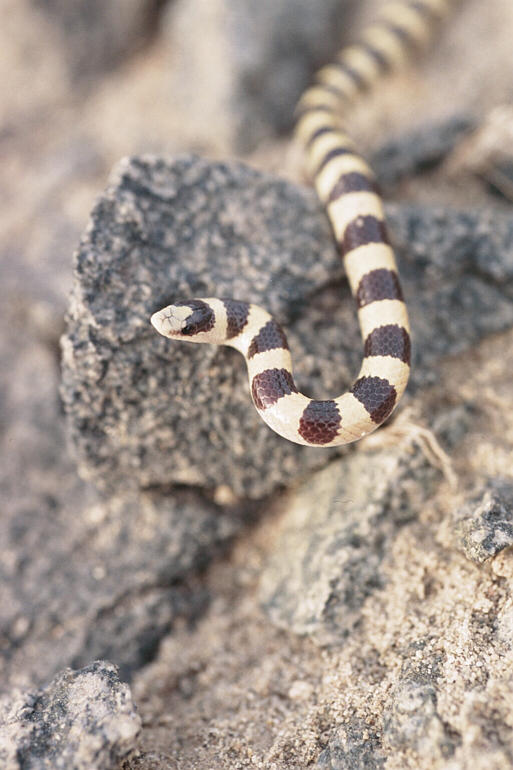

Conservation status
- Least Concern (IUCN 3.1)

Scientific classification
- Kingdom: Animalia
- Phylum: Chordata
- Class: Reptilia
- Order: Squamata
- Suborder: Serpentes
- Family: Colubridae
- Genus: Chionactis
- Species: C. occipitalis

Binomial name
- Chionactis occipitalis (Hallowell, 1854)
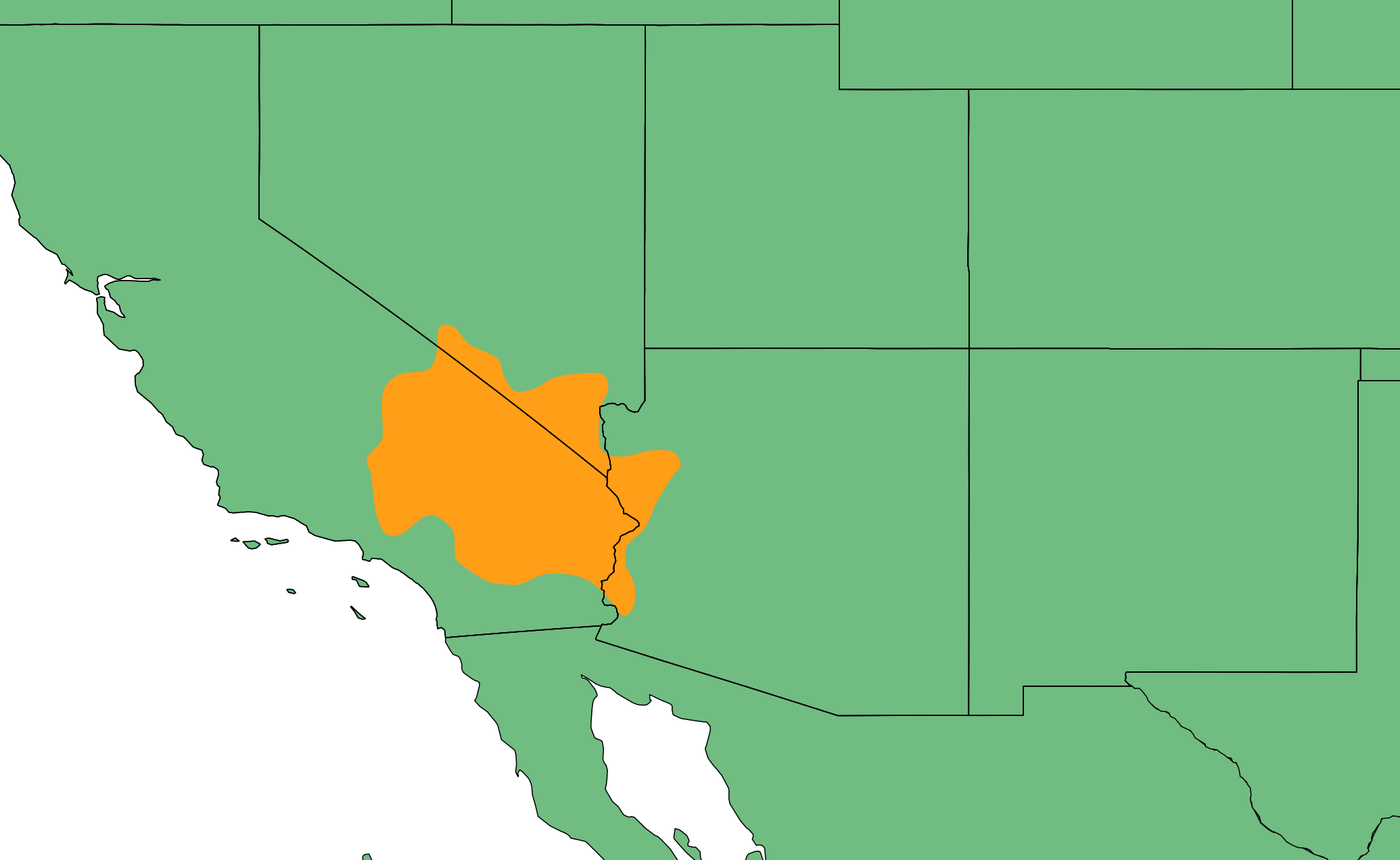

Synonyms
- Rhinostoma occipitale; Lamprosoma occipitale; Chionactis occipitale; Chionactis occipitalis; Homalosoma occipitale; Contia occipitalis; Contia occipitale; Chioractis occipitalis; Chionactis saxatilis; "Sonora occipitalis"

= Western shovelnose snake =

Species of snake

The western shovel-nosed snake (Chionactis occipitalis) is a small species of snake of the family Colubridae.

== Description ==
A small (11 - 17 inch) snake with alternating bands of orange and tan on cream or tan on cream. Less commonly specimens have been documented as having black bands on white. The snout is usually cream to light yellow and has a noticeable point to assist in digging. The small black eyes are covered by a black mask. The western shovel-nosed snake is distinguished from the similar looking coral snake, by the yellow snout and lack of full banding around the belly. A similar species, the Sonoran Shovel-nosed Snake has less than 20 bands on its body.

== Geographic Range ==
The snake is found in the United States (Arizona, California, Nevada) and Mexico. The snake is primarily found in Sonoran Desert scrub or Mojave Desert scrub.

== Diet ==
The western shovel-nosed snake feeds on a variety of invertebrates including insects, spiders, centipedes, and scorpions. They have been documented eating the eggs of other reptiles.

== Behavior ==
Snakes are primarily fossorial. The Western shovel-nosed Snake spends most of its life in sand or sandy soil, with peak activity for the species occurring in the spring. Mating takes place in the spring and adult females will lay up to nine eggs in the summer.

== Subspecies ==
There are three subspecies currently recognized.

C.occipitalis annulata - Colorado Desert Shovel-nosed Snake

C. occipitalis klauberi - Tucson Shovel-nosed Snake

C. occipitalis occipitalis - Mohave Shovel-nosed Snake
