= Sonora michoacanensis =

Conservation status
- Least Concern (IUCN 3.1)

Scientific classification
- Kingdom: Animalia
- Phylum: Chordata
- Class: Reptilia
- Order: Squamata
- Suborder: Serpentes
- Family: Colubridae
- Genus: Sonora
- Species: S. michoacanensis

Binomial name
- Sonora michoacanensis (Dugès, 1884)

Species of snake

Sonora michoacanensis, the Michoacán ground snake, is a species of snake of the family Colubridae.

The snake is found in Mexico.
