= Laurence Monroe Klauber =

American herpetologist (1883–1968)

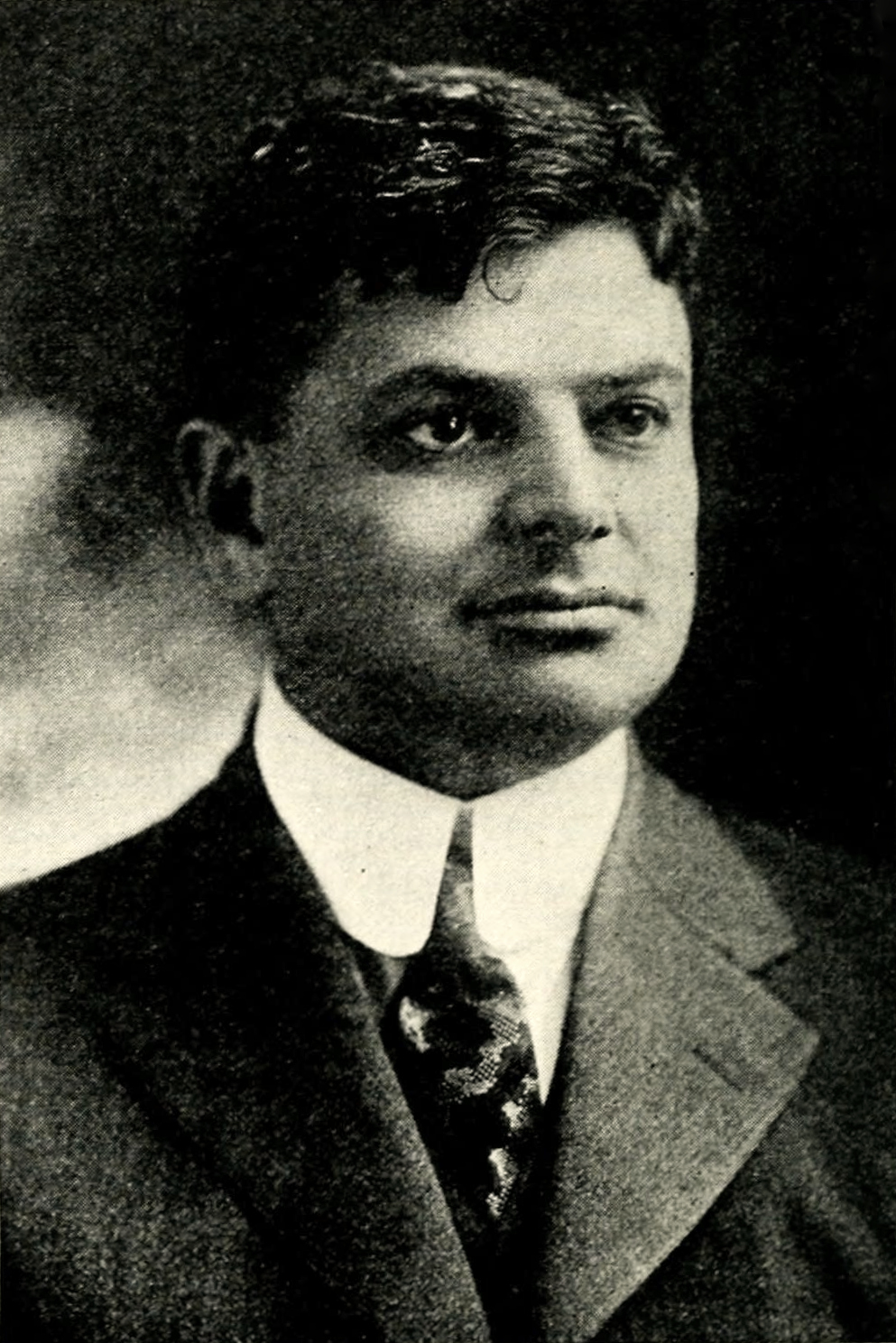
- Klauber c. 1924
- Born: December 21, 1883; San Diego, California
- Died: May 8, 1968 (aged 84); San Diego, California
- Education: Stanford University
- Scientific career
- Fields: Herpetology
- Workplaces: San Diego Natural History Museum, San Diego Zoo

Laurence Monroe Klauber (December 21, 1883, in San Diego, California – May 8, 1968, in San Diego), was an American herpetologist and the foremost authority on rattlesnakes. He was the first curator of reptiles and amphibians at the San Diego Natural History Museum and Consulting Curator of Reptiles for the San Diego Zoo. He was also a businessman, inventor, and contributed to mathematics in his study of the distribution of prime numbers.

== Biography ==
The youngest of Theresa Epstein and Abraham Klauber's twelve children, Klauber was born on December 21, 1883, in San Diego, California. He received his A.B. degree (Electrical Engineering) from Stanford University in 1908 and completed a Westinghouse graduate apprenticeship course in 1910. He married Grace Gould in 1911, and in that same year began his career with San Diego Gas & Electric Company. He received an honorary LL.D. from the University of California, Los Angeles, in 1941. Klauber died on May 8, 1968, in San Diego.

== Businessman and inventor ==
Before becoming a herpetologist, Klauber worked for many years with the San Diego Gas & Electric Company. He worked his way up in the company from his first job as electric sign salesman thru electrical engineering positions; ultimately he became president in 1947, then chairman of the board of directors, a position he held from 1950 until his retirement in 1953. Klauber held eight U.S. patents (plus 2 jointly) for inventions relating to energy transmission.

== Herpetology ==
In 1923, Dr. Harry M. Wegeforth of the newly opened San Diego Zoo asked Klauber to identify several species of snake recently acquired. Even though reptiles were not much more than a hobby to him at the time, he took the job and eventually became Consulting Curator of Reptiles. In addition, he became a member of the Zoological Society's Board of Trustees in 1945, and served as its president from 1949 to 1951. As curator, he dedicated the following 35 years of his life to the study of reptiles, and rattlesnakes in particular. The result of that considerable amount of time and amassed data was his magnum opus, the two-volume book entitled Rattlesnakes: Their Habits, Life Histories and Influence on Mankind, published in 1956. It is still considered to be the most complete and authoritative resource ever written on rattlesnakes.

In his research and field work, Klauber is credited with describing 53 new taxa of reptiles and amphibians (such as Arizona elegans candida, Sonora palarostris, Pituophis catenifer pumilis, and Charina umbratica) and has been recognized by his fellow herpetologists by having had 14 new taxa named after him (such as Sonora annulata klauberi, Crotalus lepidus klauberi, Ensatina eschscholtzii klauberi, Hemidactylus klauberi, Hypsiglena ochrorhynchus klauberi, Sauromalus klauberi, Sphaerodactylus klauberi, and Terrapene nelsoni klauberi). He donated approximately 36,000 specimens to the San Diego Natural History Museum, and his extensive personal library and field notes were donated there upon his death.

Klauber's rattlesnake collection, containing over 8,600 specimens, comprises the core of the museum's Herpetology Department collection; at over 9,300 rattlesnake specimens, it is one of the largest rattlesnake collections in the world.

== Mathematics ==
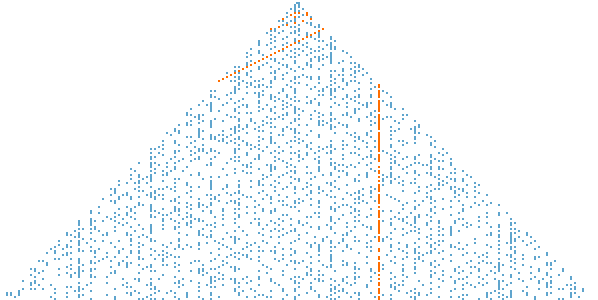
Klauber prime triangle. Prime numbers generated by Euler's polynomial are highlighted

In the early 1930s, Klauber proposed a geometric arrangement of primes not unlike Ulam's spiral. In 1932, Klauber presented a paper on a triangular, non-spiral matrix to the Mathematical Association of America demonstrating geometric regularity in the distribution of the primes. The lines of primes in the Klauber triangle meet at 60° angles, while in an Ulam Spiral (1963), they meet at 90° angles.

Klauber's interest in mathematics—and the extensive samples of rattlesnakes that he accumulated for study—led to his most significant contribution to herpetology, the application of statistical methods to aid in the classification of reptiles. He pioneered the use of quantitative analysis in herpetology to determine variation in snakes and to weigh the differences between species and subspecies.

== Patents ==
- (A) US patent 1196118 (A), Klauber, Laurence M., "Method of soldering metals", issued 1916-08-29
- (A) US patent 1352816 (A), Klauber, Laurence M., "Repeating fuse apparatus", issued 1920-09-14
- (A) US patent 1359509 (A), Klauber, Laurence M., "Wishbone cross-arm construction for transmission-poles", issued 1920-11-23
- (A) US patent 1371378 (A), Klauber, Laurence M., "Oil-testing apparatus", issued 1921-?0-15
- (A) US patent 1395046 (A), Klauber, Laurence M., "Automatic circuit-controlling apparatus", issued 1921-10-25
- (A) US patent 1454289 (A), Klauber, Laurence M., "Lightning arrester", issued 1923-05-08
- (A) US patent 1503269 (A), Klauber, Laurence M., "Automatic circuit-making switch for high-potential circuits", issued 1924-07-29
- (A) US patent 1597320 (A), Klauber, Laurence M., "Circuit-making device", issued 1926-08-24

As co-author

- (A) US patent 1213211 (A), Klauber, Laurence M. & Ray C. Cavell, "Current-distributing apparatus", issued 1917-01-23
- (A) US patent 1371379 (A), Symons, William H. & Laurence M. Klauber, "Remote-controlled switch for high-tension transmission-lines", issued 1921-03-15

== Society memberships ==
- American Association for the Advancement of Science
- American Chemical Society
- Ecological Society of America
- American Gas Association
- American Geographical Society
- American Mathematical Society
- American Museum of Natural History
- American Society of Ichthyologists and Herpetologists (President, 1938–40)
- American Society of Civil Engineers
- American Society of Mechanical Engineers
- American Statistical Association
- California Academy of Sciences
- Fellow, American Institute of Electrical Engineers
- Mathematical Association of America
- Pacific Coast Electrical Association (President 1911, J-24)
- Pacific Coast Gas Association (President 1927–28)
- San Diego Society of Natural History
- Seismological Society of America
- Western Society of Naturalists
- Sigma Xi
- Tau Beta Pi
