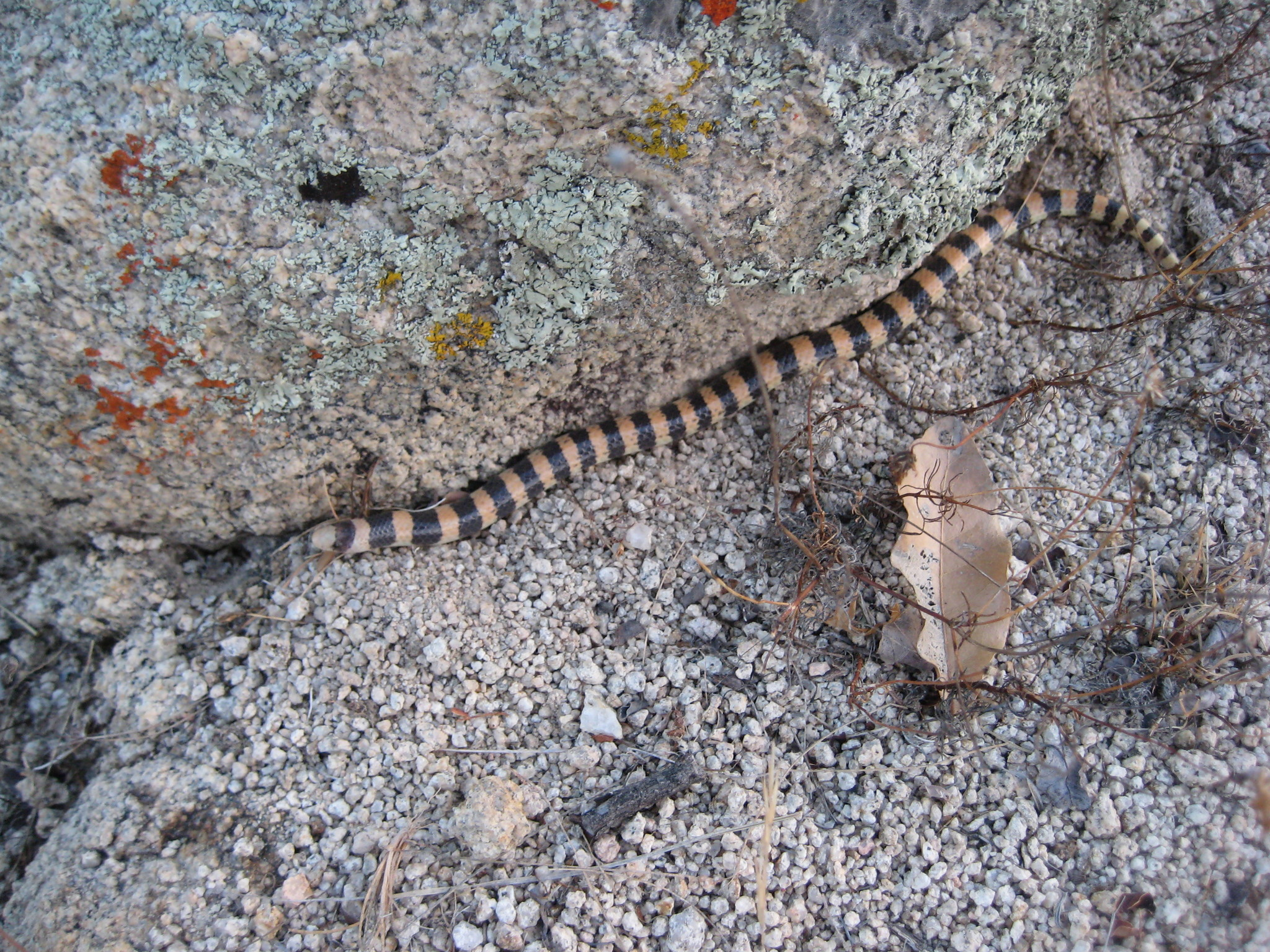

Scientific classification
- Kingdom: Animalia
- Phylum: Chordata
- Class: Reptilia
- Order: Squamata
- Suborder: Serpentes
- Family: Colubridae
- Genus: Sonora
- Species: S. fasciata

Binomial name
- Sonora fasciata (Cope, 1892)

= Sonora fasciata =

Species of snake

Sonora fasciata, the variable sand snake or banded sand snake, is a species of snake of the family Colubridae.

The snake is found in Mexico.
