= Sonora palarostris =

Conservation status
- Least Concern (IUCN 3.1)

Scientific classification
- Kingdom: Animalia
- Phylum: Chordata
- Class: Reptilia
- Order: Squamata
- Suborder: Serpentes
- Family: Colubridae
- Genus: Chionactis
- Species: C. palarostris

Binomial name
- Chionactis palarostris (Klauber, 1937)
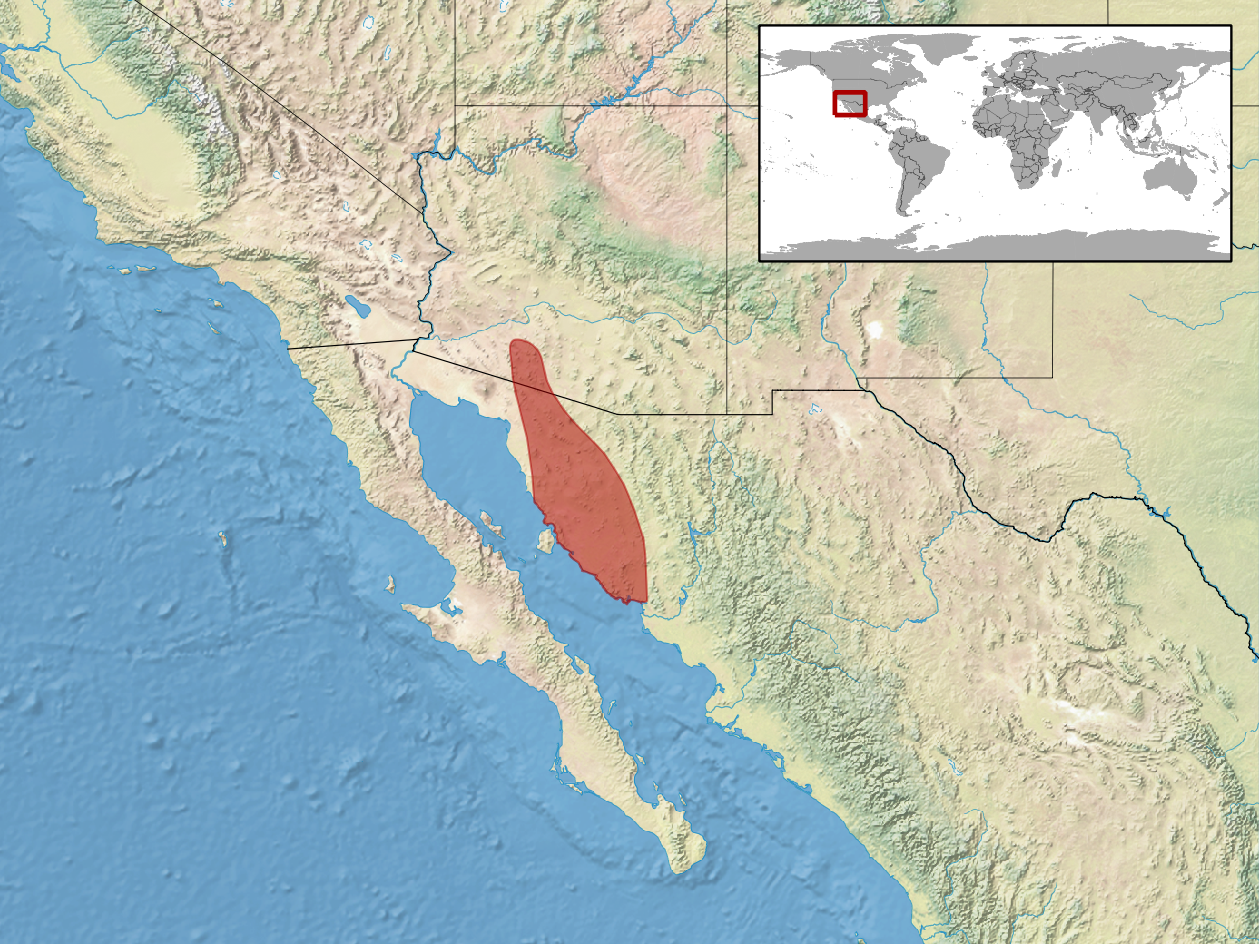

Synonyms
- Sonora palarostris Klauber, 1937; Chionactis occipitalis palarostris — H.M. Smith & Taylor, 1950; Chionactis palarostris — Stebbins, 1985

Species of snake

Chionactis palarostris, commonly known as the Sonoran Shovel-nosed snake, is a species of small nonvenomous colubrid which is a native of the Sonoran Desert in North America.

== Etymology ==
The specific name, palarostris, is from Latin: pāla (shovel) and rōstrum (beak or snout).

== Geographic range ==
C. palarostris is found in the southwestern United States and northwestern Mexico. In the United States it is found only in Organ Pipe Cactus National Monument of western Pima County, Arizona. The subspecies occurring there is called the Organ Pipe shovelnose snake (C. p. organica). In Mexico it is found only in the state of Sonora.

== Description ==
S. palarostris is cross-banded with black, yellow (or whitish), and red bands. Consequently, it resembles the Sonoran coral snake (Micruroides euryxanthus). The mnemonic "red on yellow kill a fellow, red on black, friend of Jack" doesn't work with this snake. However, unlike the coral snake, which has a black snout, Sonora palarostris has a yellow snout and is not venomous. Also on a coral snake, the bands go all the way around, but S. palarostris has a solid yellow belly.

The smooth dorsal scales are arranged in 15 rows at midbody; ventrals, 141–181; subcaudals, 34–64, divided.

Maximum total length (including tail) of adults is 43 cm (17 in).

== Subspecies ==
Two subspecies are recognized, including the nominotypical subspecies, along with their geographic locations:

Common Name	Scientific Name	Geographic Range
Organ Pipe shovelnose snake	Sonora palarostris organica Klauber, 1951	Northeast Arizona, parts of New Mexico, Southeast Utah, and likely southwest Colorado as well.
Sonoran shovelnose snake	Sonora palarostris palarostris (Klauber, 1937)	

== Behavior ==
S. palarostris is active in the evening and at night, mostly near washes.
