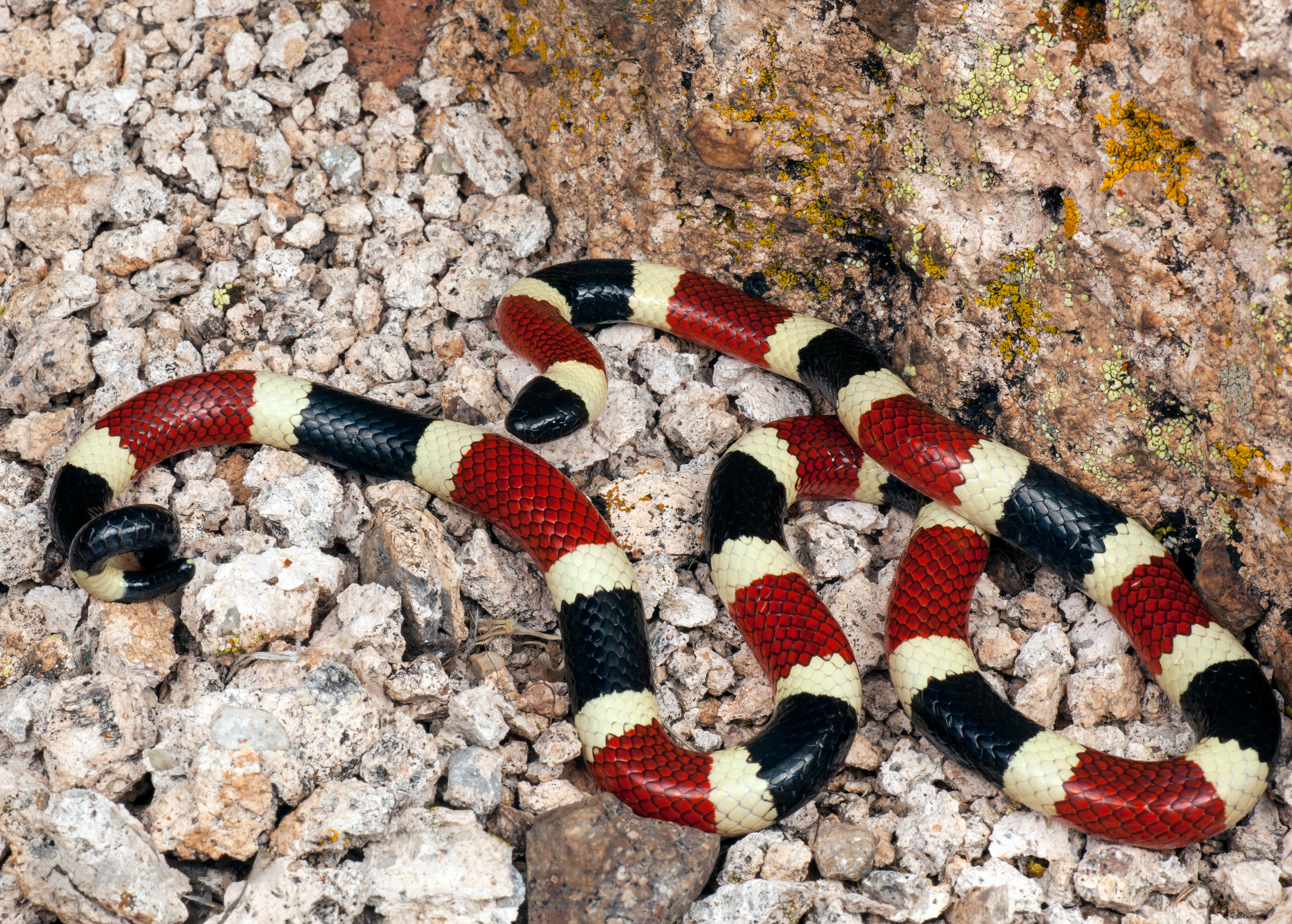

Conservation status
- Least Concern (IUCN 3.1)

Scientific classification
- Kingdom: Animalia
- Phylum: Chordata
- Class: Reptilia
- Order: Squamata
- Suborder: Serpentes
- Family: Elapidae
- Genus: Micruroides; K.P. Schmidt, 1928
- Species: M. euryxanthus

Binomial name
- Micruroides euryxanthus (Kennicott, 1860)

Synonyms
- Elaps euryxanthus Kennicott, 1860; Micrurus euryxanthus — Stejneger & Barbour, 1917; Micruroides euryxanthus — K.P. Schmidt, 1928

= Micruroides =

Micruroides euryxanthus

Genus of snakes

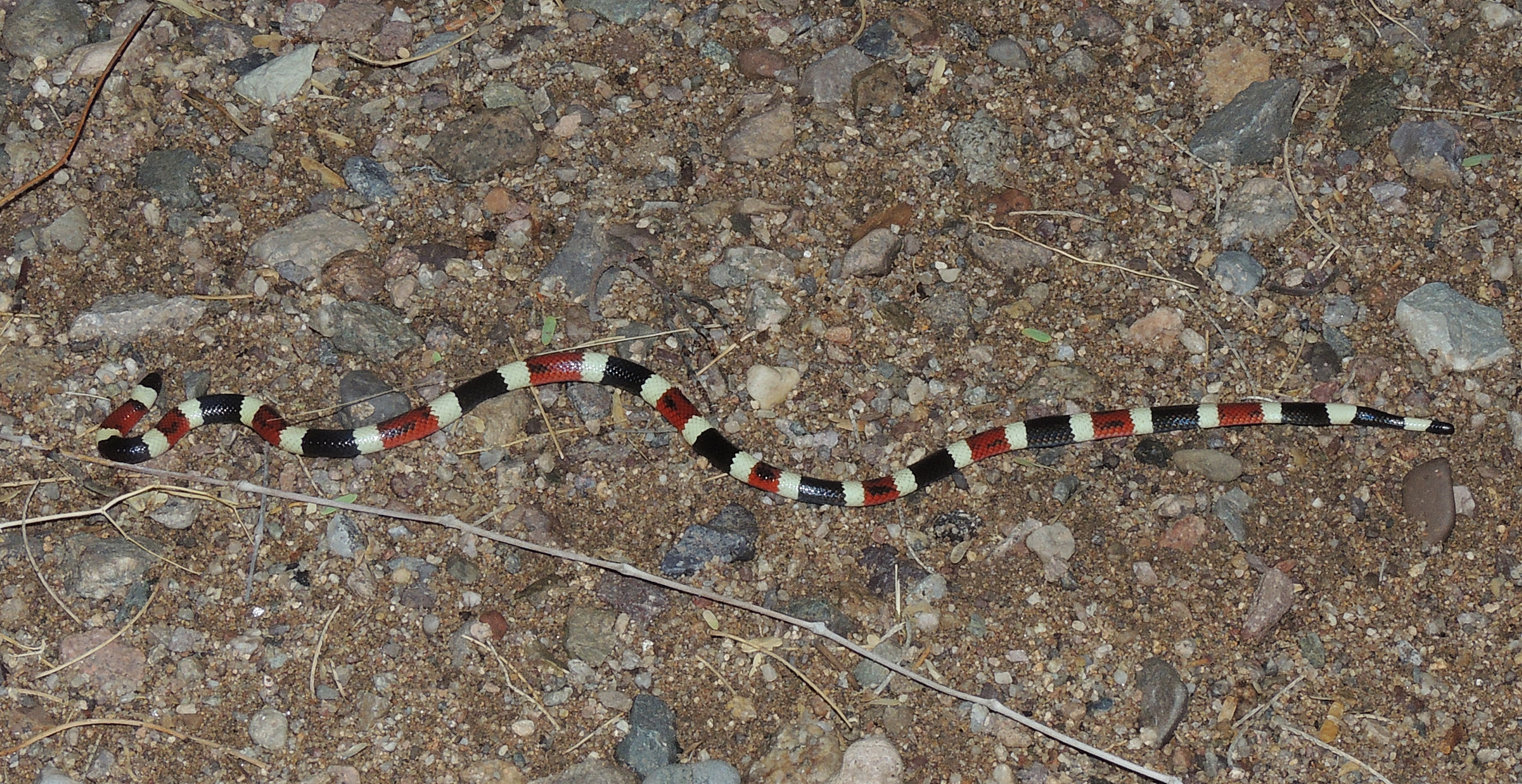
Sonoran coral snake in Arizona.

Micruroides is a genus of venomous New World coral snake in the family Elapidae. The genus is monotypic, containing only the species Micruroides euryxanthus.

Micruroides euryxanthus, commonly known as the Sonoran coral snake, western coral snake, Arizona coral snake, and coralillo in Mexican Spanish, is native to the southwestern United States and adjacent northwestern Mexico.

== Description ==
Adults of Micruroides euryxanthus are 11–24 inches (28–61 centimetres) in total length (tail included).

The color pattern consists of broad, alternating rings of red and black, separated by narrower rings of white or yellow. Markings become paler as they reach the belly. The head is black, the black extending to the posterior border of the parietals.

The smooth dorsal scales are arranged in 15 rows at midbody. The ventrals number 214–241. The anal plate is divided. The subcaudals number 21–34, and are divided (paired).

Micruroides euryxanthus resembles Micrurus fulvius. However, the white or yellow rings are broader than in M. fulvius, and there are fewer black rings on the tail, usually only 2. Also, the first ring on the body (the first ring behind the white or yellow ring on the back of the head) is red, whereas in Micrurus fulvius it is black.

== Venom ==
The venom of Micruroides euryxanthus is neurotoxic and extremely potent, but no fatalities have been reported.

The estimated lethal dose for an adult human is 6–8 mg. When live specimens were "milked" in a laboratory, the average venom yield was only 0.12 mg (dry weight). However, the maximum venom yield was 6 mg.

== Habitat ==
Micruroides euryxanthus is found in arid and semiarid regions in numerous habitats, both on plains and on lower mountain slopes, from sea level to 5,800 ft (1,800 m). In Arizona it is abundant in rocky upland desert.

== Behavior ==
The Sonoran coral snake usually stays underground and comes out at night, but can also appear during and after rains.

== Defense ==
When startled, frightened, or threatened, Micruroides euryxanthus will hide its head under its body and raise and tightly curl its tail. While in this posture, it will "fart": snakes do not have an anal cavity in the sense that humans and most mammals do, but rather a tract that allows for both disposal of waste and for laying of eggs in females. Instead, it will forcibly and noisily emit gas from its cloaca, a behavior known as "cloacal popping", and predictably this phenomenon has a very unpleasant smell.

== Diet ==
Micruroides euryxanthus preys upon small snakes, predominantly those of the genus Rena, but also those of the genera Sonora, Tantilla, and Chilomeniscus. It will also eat small lizards such as skinks.

== Reproduction ==
Like all other species of New World coral snakes (genera Leptomicrurus and Micrurus), Micruroides euryxanthus is oviparous. Adult females may lay up to 3 eggs, and each hatchlings is 18–20 cm (7–8 in) in total length.

== Geographic distribution ==
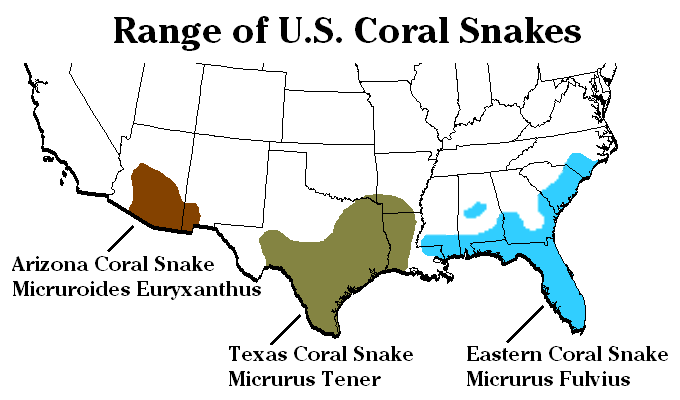
Geographic distributions of the three species of coral snakes native to the United States

Micruroides euryxanthus is found from central Arizona and southwestern New Mexico to Mazatlán in southern Sinaloa. Isolated populations are also found in the Chocolate Mountains, La Paz County, western Arizona and on Tiburón Island in the Gulf of California.

== Subspecies ==
Three subspecies are recognized, including the nominotypical subspecies.

- Micruroides euryxanthus australis Zweifel & Norris, 1955 – southwestern Chihuahua, southern Sonora
- Micruroides euryxanthus euryxanthus (Kennicott, 1860) – southern Arizona, southwestern New Mexico, northwestern Chihuahua, northern Sonora
- Micruroides euryxanthus neglectus Roze, 1967 – Sinaloa

Nota bene: A trinomial authority in parentheses indicates that the subspecies was originally described in a different genus than the one within which it is currently classified.
