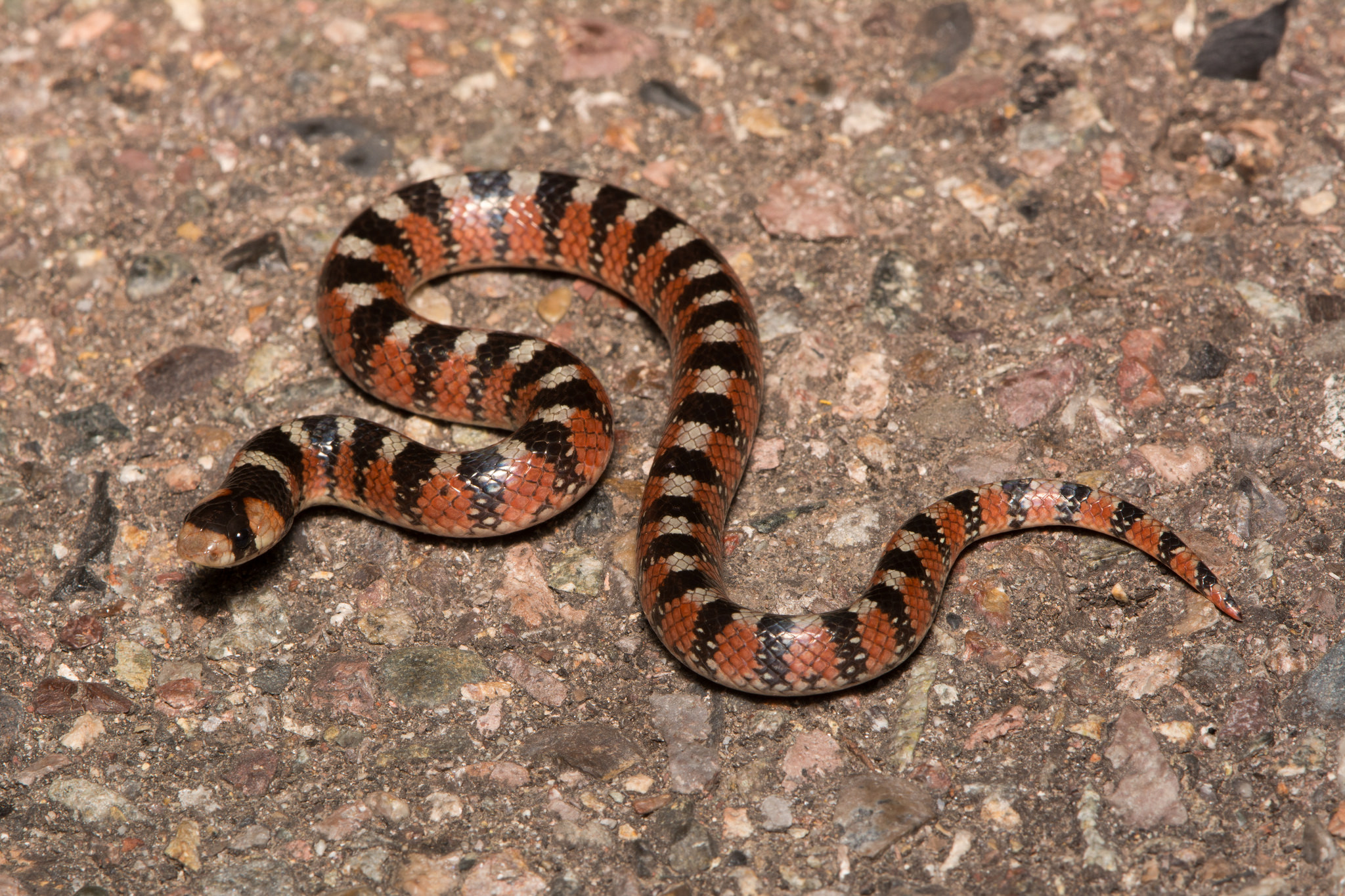

Conservation status
- Least Concern (IUCN 3.1)

Scientific classification
- Kingdom: Animalia
- Phylum: Chordata
- Class: Reptilia
- Order: Squamata
- Suborder: Serpentes
- Family: Colubridae
- Genus: Gyalopion
- Species: G. quadrangulare

Binomial name
- Gyalopion quadrangulare (Günther, 1893)
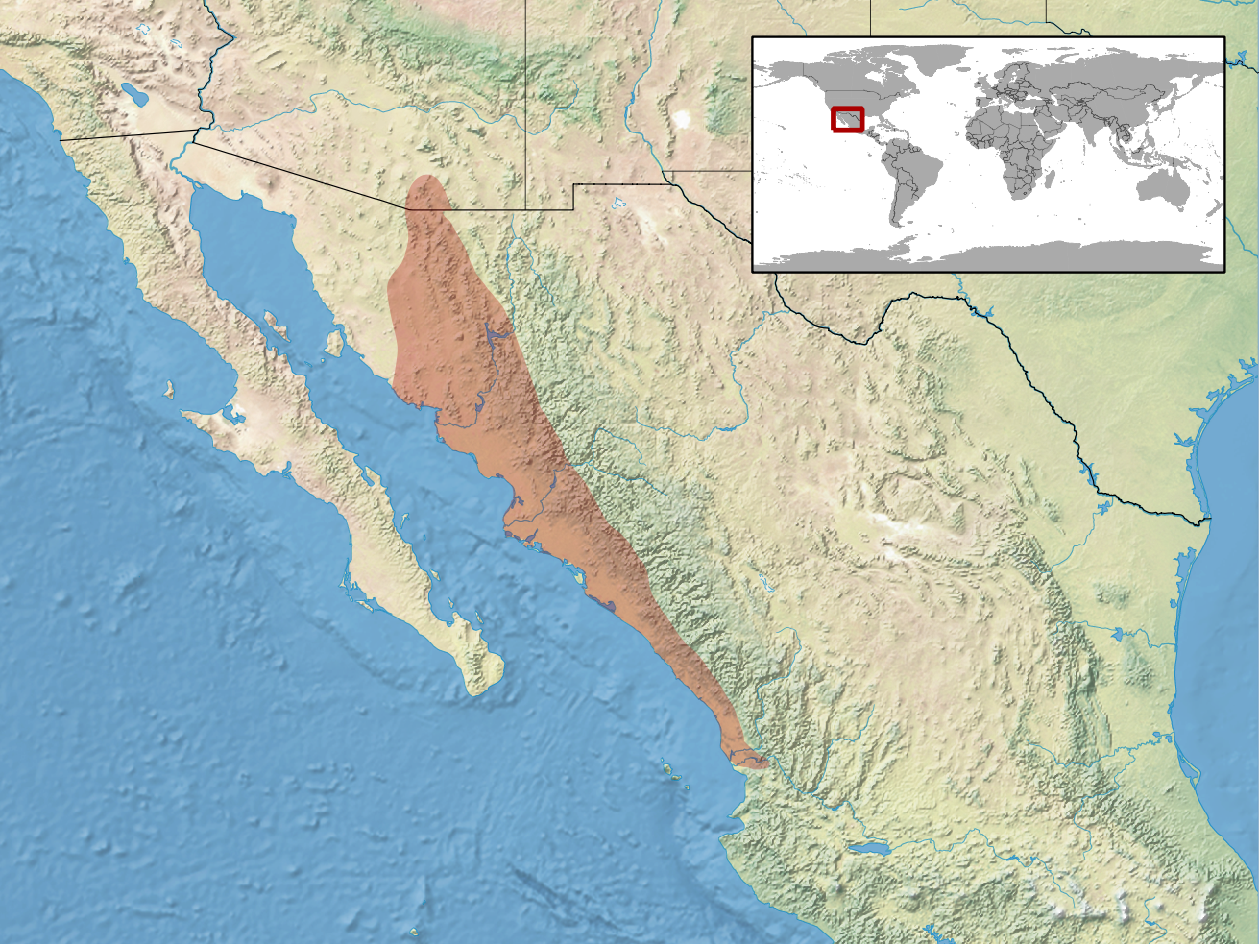

= Gyalopion quadrangulare =

Species of snake

Gyalopion quadrangulare, the thornscrub hook-nosed snake or desert hook-nosed snake, is a species of non-venomous snake in the family Colubridae. The species is found in Arizona in the United States and Mexico.
