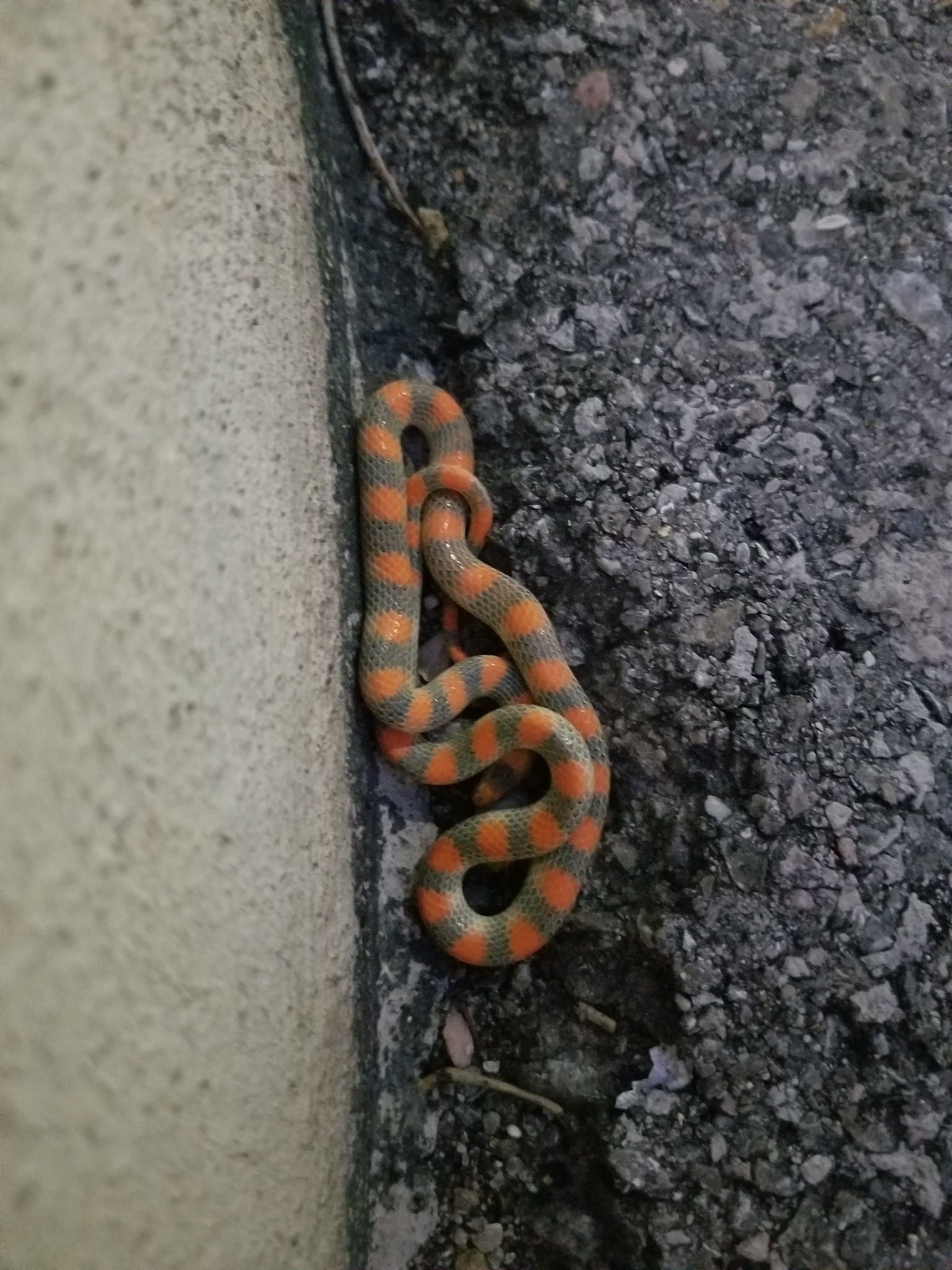

Conservation status
- Least Concern (IUCN 3.1)

Scientific classification
- Kingdom: Animalia
- Phylum: Chordata
- Class: Reptilia
- Order: Squamata
- Suborder: Serpentes
- Family: Colubridae
- Genus: Sonora
- Species: S. semiannulata

Binomial name
- Sonora semiannulata Baird and Girard, 1853
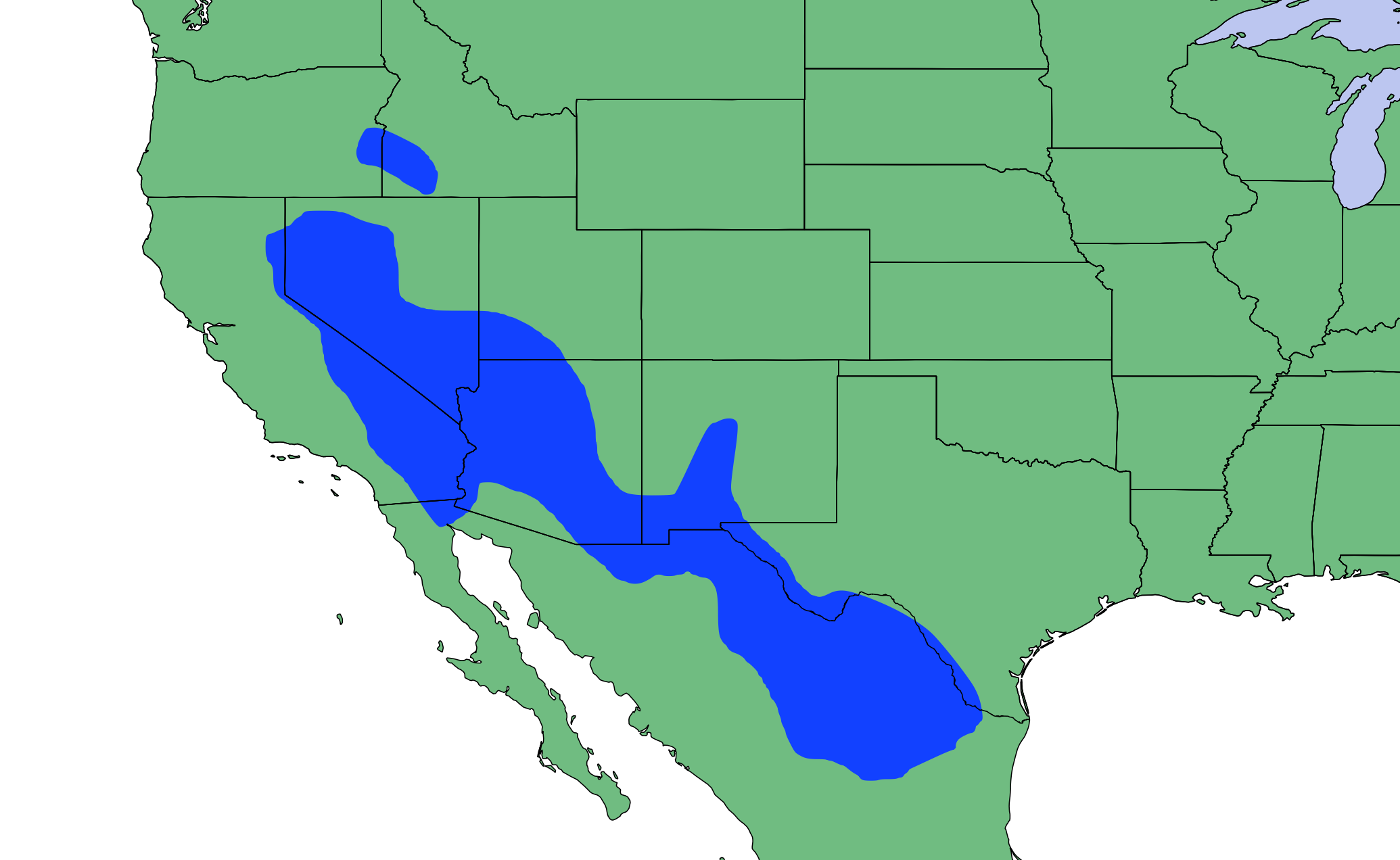

Synonyms
- Sonora semiannulata Baird and Girard, 1853; Lamprosoma episcopum Kennicott in Baird, 1859; Homalosoma episcopum — Jan, 1865; Contia isozona Cope, 1866; Contia episcopa isozona — Cope,1880; Contia taylori Boulenger, 1894; Chionactis episcopus isozonus — Cope, 1900; Sonora miniata linearis Stickel, 1938; Sonora semiannulata — Liner, 1994

= Western ground snake =

Species of snake

The western ground snake (Sonora semiannulata) is a species of small, harmless colubrid snake. The species is endemic to North America. Its patterning and coloration can vary widely, even within the same geographic region. Another common name is miter snake referring to the head marking which suggests a bishop's miter; the synonym "episcopus " (Latin for "bishop") is a similar allusion.

== Geographic range ==
S. semiannulata is native to the Southwestern United States, in Arizona, Nevada, California, Colorado, Kansas, Missouri, New Mexico, Oklahoma, Oregon, Texas, and Utah, as well as northern Mexico, in Chihuahua, Coahuila, Durango, Nuevo León, and Sonora.

== Description ==
The western ground snake can grow to a total length (including tail) of 8 to 19 inches (20.3 to 48.3 cm). The color and pattern can vary widely. Individuals can be brown, red, or orange, with black banding, orange or brown striping, or be solid-colored. The underside is typically white or gray. It has smooth dorsal scales, a small head, and the pupil of the eye is round.

== Habitat ==
The preferred habitat of S. semiannulata is dry, rocky areas with loose soil.

== Behavior ==
The western ground snake is typically nocturnal and secretive, but it is common throughout its range. It is often found on roadsides, or in dry drainage ditches at night, foraging for food.

== Diet ==
The diet of S. semiannulata consists primarily of invertebrates, such as spiders, scorpions, centipedes, crickets, and insect larvae.

== Reproduction ==
The western ground snake is oviparous, breeding and laying eggs through the summer months.

== Taxonomy ==
Sonora semiannulata was once broken up into five separate subspecies, based on the vast differences in color and patterning that the species displays, but recent research has shown that the various colors and patterns of ground snake interbreed indiscriminately, making distinction between them impossible and thus not warranting subspecies status, though some sources still refer to them, using geography as a basis rather than morphology.
