= Sonora straminea =

Conservation status
- Least Concern (IUCN 3.1)

Scientific classification
- Kingdom: Animalia
- Phylum: Chordata
- Class: Reptilia
- Order: Squamata
- Suborder: Serpentes
- Family: Colubridae
- Genus: Sonora
- Species: S. straminea

Binomial name
- Sonora straminea (Cope, 1860)
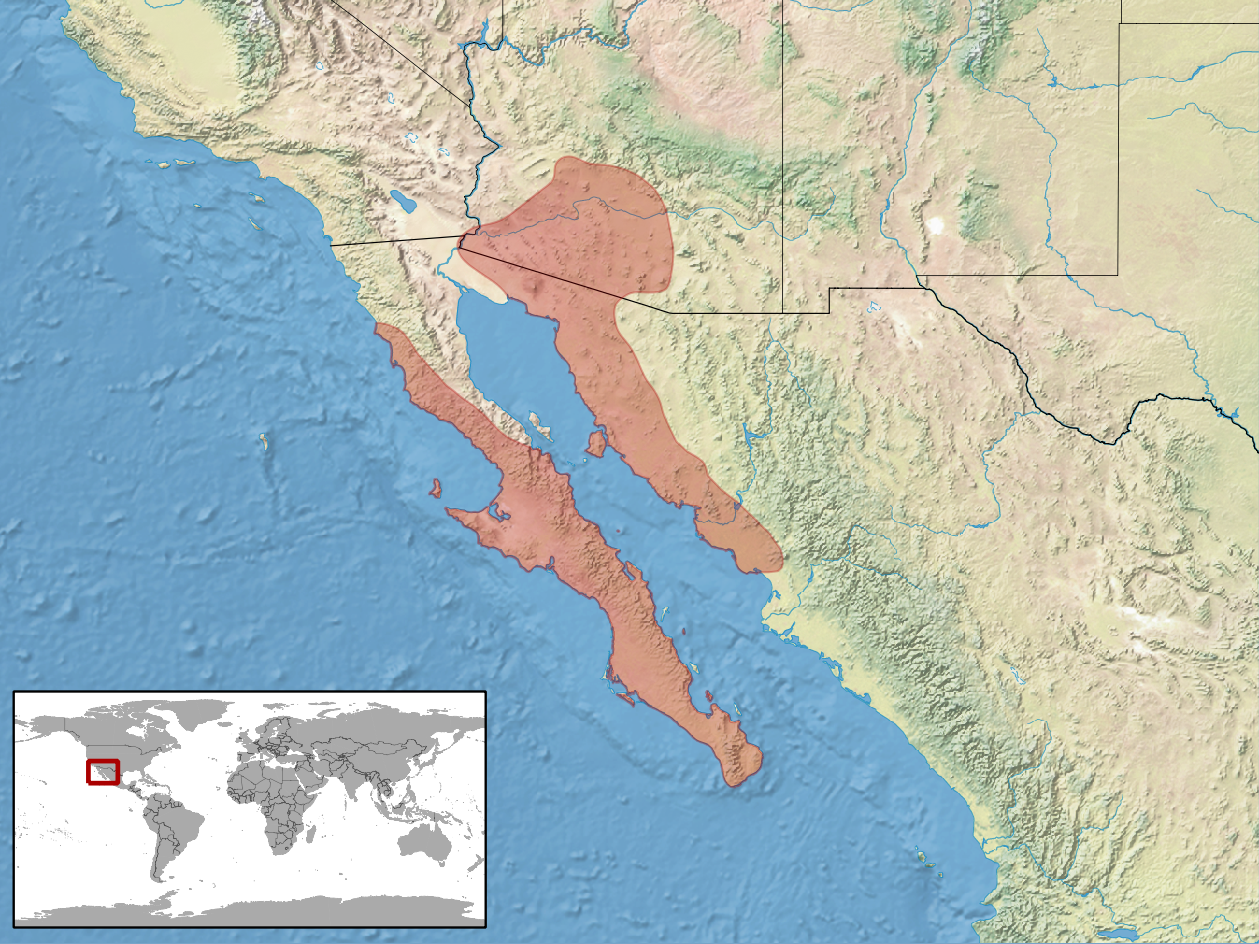

Species of snake

Sonora straminea, the variable sand snake or banded sand snake, is a species of snake of the family Colubridae.

The snake is found in Mexico.
