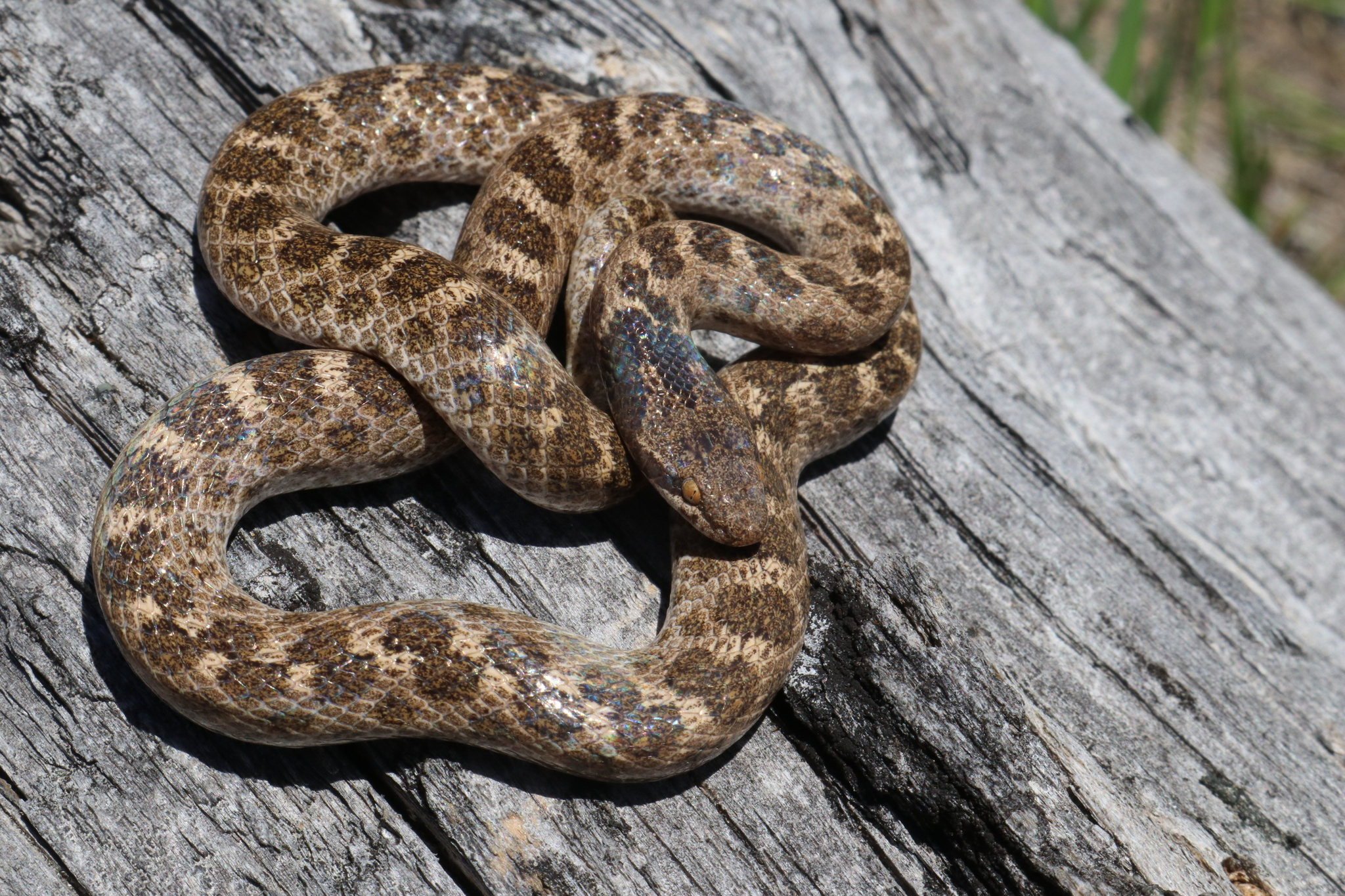

Scientific classification
- Domain: Eukaryota
- Kingdom: Animalia
- Phylum: Chordata
- Class: Reptilia
- Order: Squamata
- Suborder: Serpentes
- Family: Colubridae
- Genus: Hypsiglena
- Species: H. ochrorhynchus
- Subspecies: H. o. nuchalata

Trinomial name
- Hypsiglena ochrorhynchus nuchalata W.W. Tanner, 1943
- California night snake range

Synonyms
- Hypsiglena nuchalatus W.W. Tanner, 1943; Hypsiglena torquata nuchalata — A.H. Wright & A.A. Wright, 1957

= California night snake =

Subspecies of reptile

The California night snake (Hypsiglena ochrorhynchus nuchalata) is a subspecies of small colubrid snake native to California.

== Description ==
The California night snake grows to a total length of 12 to 26 inches (30 to 66 cm), with hatchlings about 7 inches in total length.

The snake has a narrow flat head, smooth dorsal scales in 19 rows, and eyes with vertically elliptical pupils. They are rear-fanged and considered to be venomous, but not dangerous to humans.

Its color may be light gray, light brown, tan, or cream, often matching the substrate of the region, with dark brown or dark grey blotches down the back and sides. The underside is whitish or yellowish and unmarked, and they usually have a pair of large dark markings on the neck, and a dark bar through or behind the eyes.

== Behavior ==
As their common name implies, they are a primarily nocturnal snake.

== Diet ==
Their diet consists primarily of lizards, but they will also eat smaller snakes, and occasionally the soft bodied insect.

== Habitat ==
They prefer semiarid habitats with rocky soils.

== Reproduction ==
They are an oviparous subspecies that breeds from April to September.

== Geographic range ==
The Coast night snake ranges throughout western California, ringing the central valley, but is not found in the valley itself. It is one of two night snake species in the state. The other is the desert night snake, Hypsiglena chlorophaea.
