= List of reptiles of Colorado =

Coordinates: 38.9972°N 105.5478°W

The location of the State of Colorado in the United States of America.

This is a list of individual, wild species of lizards, snakes, and turtles currently extant in the U.S. State of Colorado

== Lizards ==
Family	Species	Common name	Photo
Crotaphytidae	Crotaphytus collaris	Common collared lizard	
Crotaphytidae	Gambelia wislizenii	Long-nosed leopard lizard	
Phrynosomatidae	Holbrookia maculata	Lesser earless lizard	
Phrynosomatidae	Phrynosoma cornutum	Texas horned lizard	
Phrynosomatidae	Phrynosoma hernandesi	Greater short-horned lizard	
Phrynosomatidae	Phrynosoma modestum	Roundtail horned lizard	
Phrynosomatidae	Sceloporus graciosus	Sagebrush lizard	
Phrynosomatidae	Sceloporus magister	Desert spiny lizard	
Phrynosomatidae	Sceloporus undulatus	Eastern fence lizard	
Phrynosomatidae	Urosaurus ornatus	Ornate tree lizard	
Phrynosomatidae	Uta stansburiana	Common side-blotched lizard	
Scincidae	Plestiodon obsoletus	Great Plains skink	
Scincidae	Plestiodon multivirgatus epipleurotus ^{§}	Variable skink	
Scincidae	Plestiodon multivirgatus multivirgatus ^{§}	Many-lined skink	
Teiidae	Aspidoscelis neotesselatus *	Colorado checkered whiptail	
Teiidae	Aspidoscelis sexlineata	Six-lined racerunner	
Teiidae	Aspidoscelis tesselata	Common checkered whiptail	
Teiidae	Aspidoscelis tigris	Western whiptail	
Teiidae	Aspidoscelis velox *	Plateau striped whiptail	

^{§}Article exists for this species, but not the subspecies.

*Article exists for this genus, but not the individual species.

== Snakes ==
Family	Species	Common name	Photo
Colubridae	Pantherophis emoryi	Great Plains rat snake	
Colubridae	Arizona elegans	Glossy snake	
Colubridae	Coluber constrictor mormon ^{§}	Western yellow-bellied racer	
Colubridae	Diadophis punctatus	Ring-necked snake	
Colubridae	Heterodon nasicus	Western hognose snake	
Colubridae	Hypsiglena chlorophaea	Desert night snake	
Colubridae	Hypsiglena jani	Chihuahuan night snake	
Colubridae	Lampropeltis holbrooki	Speckled kingsnake	
Colubridae	Lampropeltis californiae	California kingsnake	
Colubridae	Lampropeltis gentilis	Western milk snake	
Colubridae	Opheodrys vernalis	Smooth green snake	
Colubridae	Masticophis flagellum	Coachwhip	
Colubridae	Masticophis taeniatus	Striped whipsnake	
Colubridae	Nerodia sipedon	Northern water snake	
Colubridae	Pituophis catenifer deserticola	Great Basin gopher snake	
Colubridae	Pituophis catenifer sayi	Bullsnake	
Colubridae	Rhinocheilus lecontei	Long-nosed snake	
Colubridae	Sonora semiannulata	Western ground snake	
Colubridae	Tantilla hobartsmithi	Southwestern blackhead snake	
Colubridae	Tantilla nigriceps	Plains blackhead snake	
Colubridae	Thamnophis cyrtopsis	Blackneck garter snake	
Colubridae	Thamnophis elegans	Western terrestrial garter snake	
Colubridae	Thamnophis proximus	Western ribbon snake	
Colubridae	Thamnophis radix	Plains garter snake	
Colubridae	Thamnophis sirtalis	Common garter snake	
Colubridae	Tropidoclonion lineatum	Lined snake	
Leptotyphlopidae	Leptotyphlops dulcis	Texas blind snake	
Viperidae	Crotalus concolor	Midget faded rattlesnake	
Viperidae	Crotalus viridis	Prairie rattlesnake	
Viperidae	Sistrurus tergeminus	Western massasauga	

^{§}Article exists for this species, but not the subspecies.

== Turtles ==
Family	Species	Common name	Photo
Chelydridae	Chelydra serpentina	Common snapping turtle	
Emydidae	Chrysemys picta bellii	Painted turtle	
Emydidae	Terrapene ornata	Ornate box turtle	
Emydidae	Trachemys scripta elegans	Red-eared slider^{†}	
Kinosternidae	Kinosternon flavescens	Yellow mud turtle	
Trionychidae	Apalone spinifera	Spiny softshell turtle	

^{†}Red-eared sliders are an introduced and invasive species to Colorado.

== See also ==
- Bibliography of Colorado
- Geography of Colorado
- History of Colorado
- Index of Colorado-related articles
- List of Colorado-related lists
- Outline of Colorado
