= Harumi Fujita (archaeologist) =

Japanese archaeologist

- 藤田はるみ
- Born: 1954 (age 71–72); Otaru, Hokkaido, Japan
- Other name: Harumi Fujita Kawabe
- Occupation: Archaeologist
- Years active: 1983–present
- Known for: Mesoamerican archaeology of the Baja California Peninsula

Harumi Fujita (Japanese: 藤田はるみ, also known as Harumi Fujita Kawabe) is a Japanese researcher of Mexican archaeology, who has specialized in pre-classical period of the northern states of Baja California and Baja California Sur. Her research has shown that fishing cultures had arisen in the area at the end of the Pleistocene period, indicating an occupation from at least 11,000 years ago. In a cave shelf known as the Babisuri Shelter, radiocarbon dating indicated the area may have been occupied 40,000 years ago.

== Early life ==
Harumi Fujita was born in 1954 in Otaru, Hokkaido, Japan and was raised in Sapporo until her fifth birthday. Because her father was a student at the University of Michigan, the family, which included a brother and her parents, moved to Ann Arbor, Michigan for two years, where Fujita began her primary schooling. Returning to Japan, she completed her secondary studies and attended Hokkaido University. After her graduation, Fujita moved to Israel to study Hebrew and met several Mexican students in her classes. Living on a kibbutz, she became interested in archaeology, visiting various sites during her two years in the country. In 1978, she moved to Mexico City and enrolled in archaeology classes at the Escuela Nacional de Antropologia e Historia (ENAH). Completing her course work in 1982, she accompanied Jesus Mora and Baudelina Garcia Uranga to the Baja California Peninsula in northern Mexico to complete her field projects. Writing her thesis on the shellfish gathered by the prehistoric indigenous people on the peninsula, she graduated with a bachelor's degree in archaeology in 1985.

== Career ==
Working on a waste pile in Baja California Sur, Fujita postulated in 1988, that the settlements along the coast from the remains of sea animals appeared to be transitory. In 1991, Fujita was designated as a researcher with the Instituto Nacional de Antropología e Historia (INAH) (National Institute of Anthropology and History) and assigned to Baja California Sur working the cape region. Her initial task was to coordinate a survey of the area and document sites. Between 1994 and 1996, Fujita's survey of the Island as well as nearby Isla Partida were compiled as El poblamiento de América visto desde la isla Espíritu Santo (The settlement of America seen from the island Espiritu Santo) and documented 127 coastal sites, which included caves, open-air campsites, shelters, and waste piles, containing artifacts, burials and cave paintings. Dated to indicate habitation between 10,000 and 21,000 years ago, the findings confirmed occupation of the island long before the arrival of Europeans.

In 1996, Fujita identified the Babisuri Shelter site on the Island of Espíritu Santo. In stratum III of the shelter, she discovered artifacts made from shell that were radiocarbon dated to yield dates indicating occupation of the site at 40,000 years ago. The findings were significant, as they indicated that habitation of the Americas may have occurred thousands of years before previously estimated. Eighty-eight different dating tests were performed on the site, confirming five layers of soils and three different occupations by inhabitants for the Archaic period. In 2000, Fujita and Judith F. Porcasi evaluated methods in which early hunters might have exploited dolphins. Lack of remains, has caused many theorists to reject that such hunting occurred in northern Mexico, but Fujita and Porcasi postulated that clacking stones together underwater from the side of a boat, could disrupt the sonar of dolphins. In areas where deep water is found near the shoreline, the technique could be used to beach the animals and allow them to be clubbed or speared, as it was in the North Atlantic and the Pacific Islands.

Fujita discovered artifacts in 2011, which were c-shaped hooks, similar to those found in Ecuador, Australia and along the coast of the Arabian Sea, indicating that as early as 8,000 to 11,000 years ago, indigenous peoples living in Baja California Sur were engaged in fishing. Fourteen of the hooks were definitively dated to the Terminal Pleistocene era, making them among the oldest fishing hooks known to exist and confirming that fishing cultures had emerged in North America before the Early Holocene period. In 2013, Aníbal Lopez Espinoza published an analysis of the cave paintings documented by Fujita, Dave Huddart and Silva. Expanding her research area along the coast covering the area between La Paz and the Sierra de las Cacachilas (west to east) and between El Novillo and Tecolote Beach (south to north), Fujita identified 172 sites with significant archaeological remains. In all, her work in Baja California Sur has identified over 500 places with traces of historical value. In 2014, she located two caves near Tecolote Beach which confirm ancient settlement of the area to around 10,000 years ago in the Early Holocene period. Similarly to earlier sites found on Espíritu Santo, marine resources and shells were frequently used by the inhabitants. Continuing her work on the site, she discovered 61 burial sites, which show funerary characteristics of dual burials for the ancient inhabitants.

== Selected works ==
- Fujita, Harumi (1991). Informe de los trabajos realizados en el proyecto Identificación y Catalogación de los Sitios Arqueológicos del Área del Cabo, BCS [Report of the work carried out in the project Identification and Cataloging of the Archaeological Sites of the Cape Area, BCS] (Report) (in Spanish). Mexico City, Mexico: INAH Technical Archives.
- Fujita, Harumi (1994). Informe de los trabajos realizados en el proyecto Identificación y Catalogación de los Sitios Arqueológicos del Área del Cabo, BCS [Report of the work carried out in the project Identification and Cataloging of the Archaeological Sites of the Cape Area, BCS] (Report) (in Spanish). Mexico City, Mexico: INAH Technical Archives.
- Fujita, Harumi (1995). "Manifestación rupestre en la región austral de BCS" [Rock manifestation in the southern region of BCS]. Revista COBACH (in Spanish) (10). Chiapas, México: Colegio de Bachilleres de Chiapas: 25–29.
- Fujita, Harumi; Rosales, Alfonso; Gutiérrez, María de la Luz (1996). "Una Puerta en el tiempo: El Médano: Un conchero en Cabo San Lucas" [A Door in Time: El Médano: A Conchero in Cabo San Lucas]. Revista Noroccidente (in Spanish): 35–52.
- Fujita, Harumi (1996). Informe de la sexta temporada de campo del proyecto Identificación y Catalogación de los Sitios Arqueológicos del Área del Cabo, BCS [Report of the sixth field season of the project Identification and Cataloging of the Archaeological Sites of the Cape Area, BCS] (Report) (in Spanish). Mexico City, Mexico: INAH Technical Archives.
- Poyatos de Paz, Gema; Fujita, Harumi (1998). "Equilibrio entre el hombre y la naturaleza: Los indígenas costeros de El Médano, Baja California Sur, México" [Balance between man and nature: The coastal Indians of El Médano, Baja California Sur, Mexico]. Revista Española de Antropología Americana (in Spanish) (28). Madrid, Spain: Universidad Complutense de Madrid: 11–38. ISSN 0556-6533.
- Fujita, Harumi (2000). Informe del recorrido de superficie realizado en la localidad denominada "El Rincón" en el municipio de Los Cabos, La Paz, BCS, México [Report of the surface route carried out in the locality called "El Rincón" in the municipality of Los Cabos, La Paz, BCS, Mexico] (Report) (in Spanish). Mexico City, Mexico: INAH Technical Archives.
- Porcasi, Judith F.; Fujita, Harumi (July 2000). "The Dolphin Hunters: A Specialized Prehistoric Maritime Adaptation in the Southern California Channel Islands and Baja California". American Antiquity. 65 (3). Cambridge, England: Cambridge University Press: 543–566. doi:10.2307/2694535. ISSN 0002-7316. JSTOR 2694535. S2CID 161537599.
- Fujita, Harumi; Porcasi, Judith F.; Poyatos de Pas, Gema (July–December 2002). "Explotación intensiva de delfines en Las Tinas núm. 3, Baja California Sur" [Intensive exploitation of dolphins in Las Tinas no. 3, Baja California Sur]. Arqueología Secunda Época (in Spanish) (28). Mexico City, Mexico: Instituto Nacional de Antropología e Historia: 5–20. ISSN 0187-6074.
- Fujita, Harumi (2003). "Enterramientos en concheros y cuevas de Baja California Sur" [Burials in piles and caves of Baja California Sur]. Revista Arqueología Mexicana (in Spanish). 11 (62). Mexico City, Mexico: Editorial Raices: 40–43. ISSN 0188-8218.
- Fujita, Harumi; Poyatos de Paz, Gema (2003). "Prehistoric Quarrying and Stone Tool Production at El Pulguero, Baja California Sur, Mexico" (PDF). PCAS Quarterly. 39 (2–3). Costa Mesa, California: Pacific Coast Archaeological Society: 23–36. ISSN 0552-7252.
- Fujita, Harumi (2004). "El desierto rodeado del mar: Condiciones favorables para la supervivencia de los indígenas de Baja California Sur". In Kirchhoff, Paul; Salas Quintanal, Hernán; Pérez-Taylor Aldrete, Rafael (eds.). Desierto y fronteras: el norte de México y otros contextos culturales [The desert surrounded by the sea: Favorable conditions for the survival of the indigenous people of Baja California Sur] (in Spanish) (1st. ed.). México, D.F.: Universidad Nacional Autónoma. pp. 203–224. ISBN 978-9-703-21573-7.
- Fujita, Harumi (2006). "The Cape Region". In Laylander, Don; Moore, Jerry D. (eds.). The prehistory of Baja California advances in the archaeology of the forgotten peninsula. Gainesville: University Press of Florida. pp. 82–98. ISBN 978-08-130-296-58.
- Fujita, Harumi; Lara, Aline; Martínez Rojo, Iziar; Aguilera, Raúl; Franco Pérez, Armando (2007). Informe del salvamento arqueológico "Vista Serena", Municipio de Los Cabos, BCS [Archaeological salvage report "Vista Serena", Municipality of Los Cabos, BCS] (Report) (in Spanish). Mexico City, Mexico: INAH Technical Archives.
- Fujita, Harumi (2009). Informe final del proyecto "El poblamiento de América visto desde la isla Espíritu Santo, B. C. S." [Final report of the project "The settlement of America seen from the island Espíritu Santo, B.C. S."] (Report) (in Spanish). Mexico City, Mexico: INAH Technical Archives.
- Fujita, Harumi (2009). "Rhyolite Bifacial Preform Production at el Pulguero: A Prehistoric Quarry and Workshop Site in the Cape Region of Baja California" (PDF). SCA Proceedings. 22. Chico, California: Society for California Archaeology: 1–6.
- Piña Villalobos, Luisa; Fujita, Harumi; Bulhusen, Karim (2009). Informe del salvamento arqueológico en el predio "La Capilla" en la Bahía Las Palmas, Municipio de Los Cabos, BCS [Archaeological salvage report on the "La Capilla" property in Las Palmas Bay, Municipality of Los Cabos, BCS] (Report) (in Spanish). Mexico City, Mexico: INAH Technical Archives.
- Fujita, Harumi (2010). "Prehistoric Occupation of Espíritu Santo Island, Baja California Sur, Mexico: Update and Synthesis". Journal of California and Great Basin Anthropology. 30 (1). Banning, California: Malki Museum Press, San Diego State University: 17–33. ISSN 0191-3557. JSTOR 23215633.
- Laylander, Don; Fujita, Harumi; Guía Ramírez, Andrea (2013). "Clues to Baja California's Prehistory from Marine Shell". SCA Proceedings. 27. Chico, California: Society for California Archaeology: 57–72.
- Fujita, Harumi; Melgar, Emiliano (March 2014). "Early Holocene use of Pleistocene fossil shells for hide-working at Covacha Babisuri on Espíritu Santo Island, Baja California Sur, Mexico". The Journal of Island and Coastal Archaeology. 9 (1). Abingdon-on-Thames, Oxfordshire, England: Taylor & Francis: 111–129. doi:10.1080/15564894.2013.840871. ISSN 1556-1828. S2CID 129116141.
- Fujita, Harumi; Bulhusen Muñoz, Karim (2014). "Landscape, Raw Material, and Prehistoric Settlement Patterns in the Area of La Paz, Baja California Sur" (PDF). SCA Proceedings. 28. Chico, California: Society for California Archaeology: 117–134. Archived from the original (PDF) on 8 April 2017.
- Fujita, Harumi (2016). "Early Holocene pearl oyster circular fishhooks and ornaments on Espíritu Santo Island, Baja California Sur". Monographs of the Western North American Naturalist. 7 (1). Provo, Utah: Monte L. Bean Life Science Museum: 129–134. ISSN 1527-0904. Article 9.
- Fujita, Harumi; Cáceres-Martínez, Carlos; Ainis, Amira F. (July 2017). "Pearl Ornaments from the Covacha Babisuri Site, Espíritu Santo Island, Baja California Sur, Mexico" (PDF). PCAS Quarterly. 53 (2–3). Costa Mesa, California: Pacific Coast Archaeological Society: 63–86. ISSN 0552-7252.
