= Hypsiglena unaocularus =

Clarion nightsnake

Scientific classification
- Kingdom: Animalia
- Phylum: Chordata
- Class: Reptilia
- Order: Squamata
- Suborder: Serpentes
- Family: Colubridae
- Genus: Hypsiglena
- Species: H. unaocularus

Binomial name
- Hypsiglena unaocularus W.W. Tanner, 1946

Synonyms
- Hypsiglena ochrorhyncha unaocularus W.W. Tanner, 1944; Hypsiglena torquata unaocularus

Species of snake

Hypsiglena unaocularus, commonly known as the Islas Revillagigedo night snake or Clarión night snake, is a species of small colubrid snake endemic to Clarion Island, initially described from a single specimen collected by William Beebe in 1936. During the next several decades, scientists were unable to detect any trace of the snake in their field studies. After an intensive search in 2013, a team of scientist identified 11 snakes that matched the original description of the species. They conducted a series of DNA tests to confirm that the Islas Revillagigedo nightsnake, formerly viewed as the subspecies Hypsiglena torquata unaocularis, is genetically distinct from related mainland snakes and should be recognized as a full species. While never formally declared extinct, this species remained absent from scientific literature due to two main factors: its home on Clarion is extremely remote and only accessible by military escort, significantly restricting the number of biologists who can access this area, and the snake's secretive, nocturnal behavior and dark coloration make it difficult to detect in the field. Because of the lack of follow-up sightings, scientists long presumed that Beebe had provided an incorrect locality for his specimen.

== Description ==
The snakes are brownish black in color and have a characteristic series of darker spots on their head and neck and grows to be approximately 18 inches long.

== Geographic range ==
The species is only found on the Mexican island of Clarion in the Revillagigedo Islands.

Location of Clarion Island in the Pacific Ocean

== Habitat ==
It lives on black lava rock habitat near the waters of Sulphur Bay.

== Origins ==
The Islas Revillagigedo nightsnake is believed to be most closely related to populations of snakes from in the Sonora-Sinaloa state border area of mainland Mexico and Isla Santa Catalina in the Gulf of California. The Clarion nightsnake likely originated from the dispersal of an ancestor that traveled by sea from a river basin in Sonora to Clarion.

== Conservation status ==
While current populations of this species appear to be viable, Clarion's fragile ecosystem is threatened by invasive species such as feral cats on neighboring islands. These cats prey on lizards, which are likely a main food source for the Clarion nightsnake.
