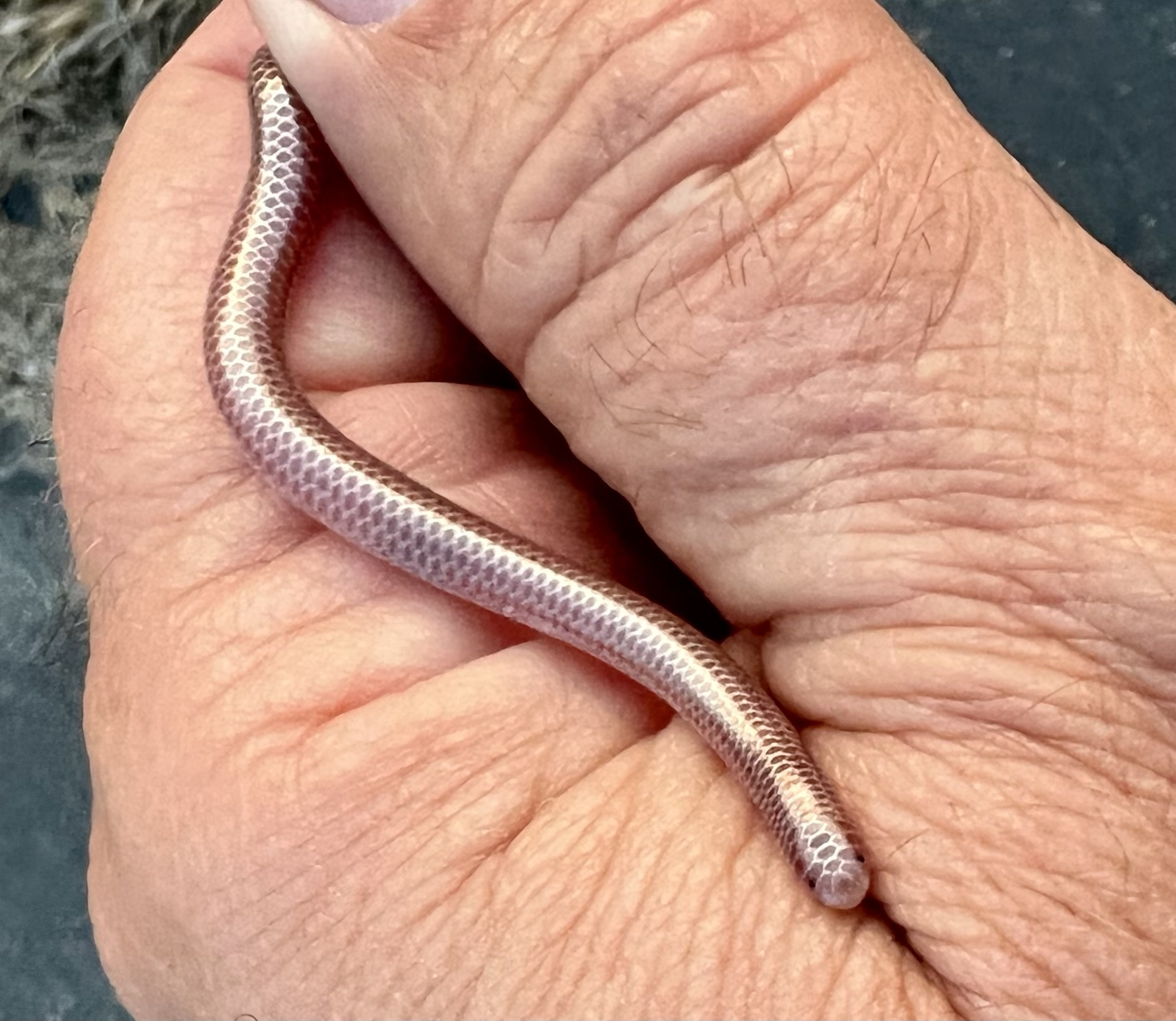
- Western threadsnake

Conservation status
- Least Concern (IUCN 3.1)

Scientific classification
- Kingdom: Animalia
- Phylum: Chordata
- Class: Reptilia
- Order: Squamata
- Suborder: Serpentes
- Family: Leptotyphlopidae
- Genus: Rena
- Species: R. humilis

Binomial name
- Rena humilis Baird & Girard, 1853
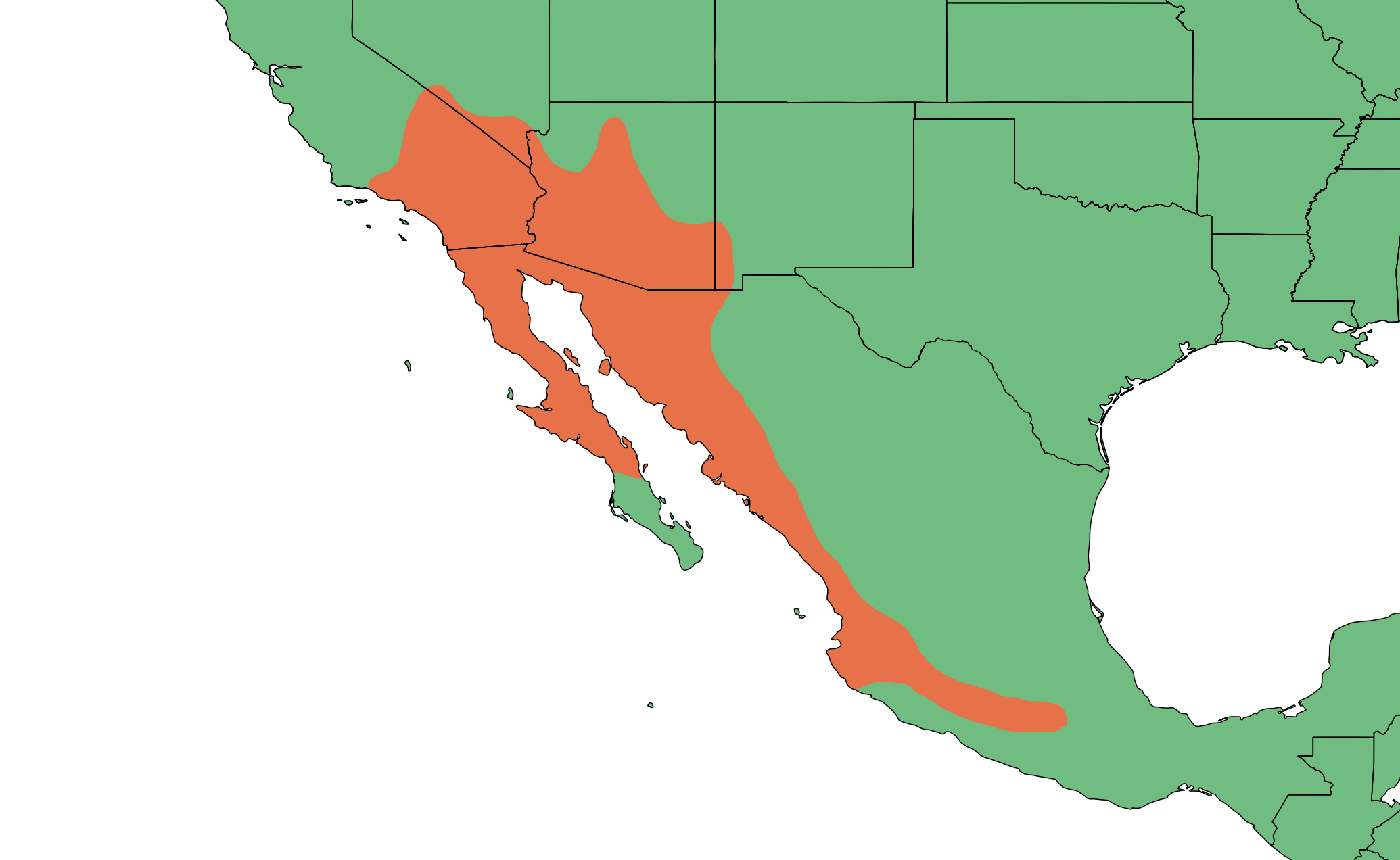

Synonyms
- Rena humilis Baird & Girard, 1853; Stenostoma humile — Cope, 1875; Rena humilis — Cope, 1887; Glauconia humilis — Boulenger, 1893; Siagonodon humilis — Van Denburgh, 1897; Leptotyphlops humilis — Ruthven, 1907; L[eptotyphlops]. h[umilis]. humilis — Klauber, 1931; Leptotyphlops humilis humilis — H.M. Smith & Taylor, 1945; Leptotyphlops chumilis Rhodes, 1966 (ex errore); Rena humilis — Adalsteinsson et al., 2009

= Rena humilis =

Species of snake

Rena humilis, known commonly as the western blind snake, the western slender blind snake, and the western threadsnake, is a species of snake in the family Leptotyphlopidae. The species is native to the southwestern United States and northern Mexico. Six subspecies are recognized as being valid, including the nominate subspecies described here.

== Description ==
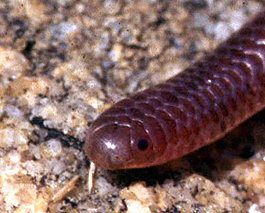
A closeup of L. humilis head

R. humilis, like most species in the family Leptotyphlopidae, resembles a long earthworm. It lives underground in burrows, and since it has no use for vision, its eyes are mostly vestigial. The western blind snake is pink, purple, or silvery-brown in color, shiny, wormlike, cylindrical, blunt at both ends, and has light-detecting black eyespots. The skull is thick to permit burrowing, and it has a spine at the end of its tail that it uses for leverage. It is usually less than 30 cm (12 in) in total length (tail included), and is as thin as an earthworm. This species and other blind snakes are fluorescent under low frequency ultraviolet light (black light).

On the top of the head, between the ocular scales, L. humilis has only one scale (L. dulcis has three scales).

== Geographic range ==
R. humilis is found in the southwestern United States and northern Mexico. In the US it ranges from southwestern and Trans-Pecos Texas west through southern and central Arizona, southern Nevada, southwestern Utah, and southern California. In Mexico its distribution includes the Mexican states of Baja California, Sonora, Sinaloa, Nayarit, Jalisco, Colima, Chihuahua, Durango, Coahuila, Tamaulipas, and San Luis Potosí.

The type locality given is "Valliecitas, Cal." The type locality was restricted by Klauber (1931) to "vicinity of Vallecito, eastern San Diego County, California," and by Brattstrom (1953) to "the Upper Sonoran Life Zone of the Vallecito area".

== Habitat and diet ==
R. humilis lives underground, sometimes as deep as 20 metres (66 ft), and is known to invade ant and termite nests. Its diet is made up mostly of insects and their larvae and eggs. It is found in deserts and scrub where the soil is loose enough for burrowing. The western threadsnake often forages within ant nests, consuming ant larvae and termites. Studies indicate that chemical secretions on its body surface help suppress ant aggression, allowing it to move through colonies unharmed (Bateman et al., 2010).

== Subspecies ==
Subspecies	Authority	Common name	Geographic range
R. h. cahuilae	Klauber, 1931	Desert blind snake	This subspecies has been confirmed spotted in southeastern California, western Arizona, and Baja California , with a possible range possibly including parts of Nevada and New Mexico, and the entirety of northwest Mexico.
R. h. humilis	(Baird & Girard, 1853)	Southwestern blind snake	Entire range is unknown, but is likely within a similar range as R. h. cahuilae.
R. h. levitoni	Murphy, 1975	Santa Catalina Island blind snake
R. h. lindsayi	Murphy, 1975	Lindsay's blind snake
R. h. tenuiculus	(Garman, 1884)
R. h. utahensis	V. Tanner, 1938	Utah blind snake
