= Spotted night snake =

There is a genus of snake named spotted night snake:

- Siphlophis

There is also a species of snake named spotted night snake:

- Hypsiglena ochrorhynchus
