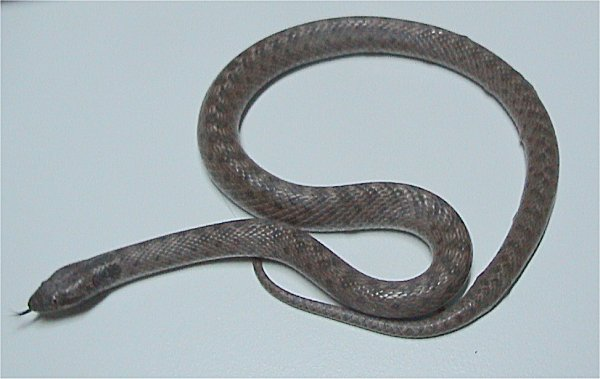
- Texas night snake Hypsiglena jani texana

Scientific classification
- Kingdom: Animalia
- Phylum: Chordata
- Class: Reptilia
- Order: Squamata
- Suborder: Serpentes
- Family: Colubridae
- Subfamily: Dipsadinae
- Genus: Hypsiglena; Cope, 1860

Synonyms
- Leptodeira (part) – Günther, 1860; Pseudodipsas W. Peters, 1860; Comastes Jan, 1863; Eridiphas Leviton & W.W. Tanner, 1960

= Hypsiglena =

Genus of snakes

Hypsiglena is a genus of small, rear-fanged snakes, commonly referred to as night snakes, in the subfamily Dipsadinae of the family Colubridae. The genus consists of nine species. Three of these species have subspecies, which have been maintained pending further investigation.

== Species and subspecies ==
The following species and subspecies are recognized as being valid.

- Hypsiglena affinis Boulenger, 1894
- Hypsiglena catalinae W. Tanner, 1966 – Santa Catalina night snake
- Hypsiglena chlorophaea Cope, 1860 – desert night snake
  - Hypsiglena chlorophaea chlorophaea Cope, 1860 – Sonoran night snake
  - Hypsiglena chlorophaea deserticola W. Tanner, 1966 – Great Basin night snake
  - Hypsiglena chlorophaea loreala W. Tanner, 1944 – Mesa Verde night snake
  - Hypsiglena chlorophaea tiburonensis W. Tanner, 1981 – Tiburón Island night snake
- Hypsiglena jani (Dugès, 1865) – Chihuahua night snake
  - Hypsiglena jani jani (Dugès, 1865) – San Luis Potosí night snake
  - Hypsiglena jani texana Stejneger, 1893 – Texas night snake
  - Hypsiglena jani dunklei Taylor, 1938 – Tamaulipas night snake
- Hypsiglena ochrorhynchus Cope, 1860 – spotted night snake
  - Hypsiglena ochrorhynchus baueri Zweifel, 1958 – Cedros Island night snake
  - Hypsiglena ochrorhynchus gularis W. Tanner, 1954 – Isla Partida night snake
  - Hypsiglena ochrorhynchus klauberi W. Tanner, 1944 – San Diego night snake
  - Hypsiglena ochrorhynchus martinensis W. Tanner & Banta 1962 – San Martín Island night snake
  - Hypsiglena ochrorhynchus nuchalata W. Tanner, 1943 – California night snake
  - Hypsiglena ochrorhynchus ochrorhynchus Cope, 1860 – Cape night snake
  - Hypsiglena ochrorhynchus tortugaensis W. Tanner, 1944 – Isla Tortuga night snake
  - Hypsiglena ochrorhynchus venusta Mocquard, 1899 – Central Baja night snake
- Hypsiglena slevini W. Tanner, 1943 – Baja California night snake
- Hypsiglena tanzeri Dixon & Lieb, 1972 – Tanzer's night snake
- Hypsiglena torquata (Günther, 1860) – night snake
- Hypsiglena unaocularus W. Tanner, 1946 – Islas Revillagigedo night snake

Nota bene: A binomial authority or trinomial authority in parentheses indicates that the species or subspecies was originally described in a genus other than Hypsiglena.

== Geographic range ==
Hypsiglena are found throughout the southwestern and western United States, from Texas and Kansas, west to California, north to Washington, and south into Mexico, as well as on islands off the coasts of Mexico.

== Habitat ==
The preferred habitat of night snakes is semiarid desert regions with rocky and sandy soils.

== Description ==
Night snakes typically do not exceed a total length (including tail) of 40 cm (16 in). They are slender-bodied with a flattened head, and have small eyes with vertical pupils. Their color varies depending on their locality, often matching the soil color of their native habitat. They occur in various shades of gray, and brown, with dark brown, gray or black blotches on the back and the sides. Many also have distinctive black markings on the neck region.

== Behavior ==
Hypsiglena are nocturnal and terrestrial.

== Diet ==
The diet of night snakes consists primarily of lizards, but they will also consume smaller snakes, and amphibians.

== Venom ==
The venom of Hypsiglena is not considered to be dangerous to humans.
