= Night snake =

Night snake may refer to:

- Siphlophis, a snake genus, the spotted night snakes
- Hypsiglena, a snake genus
- Hypsiglena torquata, a species within this genus
- Philodryas agassizii, the burrowing night snake
