= Hypsiglena catalinae =

Scientific classification
- Kingdom: Animalia
- Phylum: Chordata
- Class: Reptilia
- Order: Squamata
- Suborder: Serpentes
- Family: Colubridae
- Genus: Hypsiglena
- Species: H. catalinae

Binomial name
- Hypsiglena catalinae Tanner, 1966

Species of snake

Hypsiglena catalinae, the Isla Santa Catalina night snake, is a species of snake in the family Colubridae. The species is native to Mexico.
