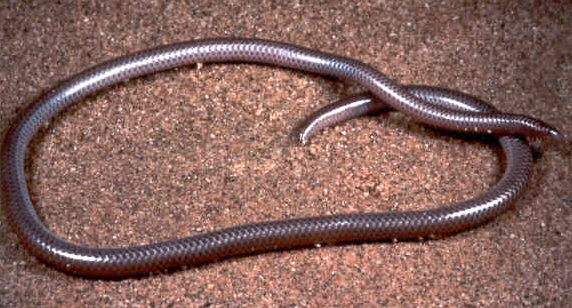
- Rena humilis, western threadsnake

Scientific classification
- Kingdom: Animalia
- Phylum: Chordata
- Order: Squamata
- Suborder: Serpentes
- Family: Leptotyphlopidae
- Subfamily: Epictinae
- Genus: Rena; Baird & Girard, 1853

= Rena (snake) =

Genus of snakes

Rena is a genus of snakes in the family Leptotyphlopidae. The genus is endemic to the New World. All of the species were previously placed in the genus Leptotyphlops.

== Species ==
The genus Rena contains the following species, which are recognized as being valid.

- Rena boettgeri (F. Werner, 1899)
- Rena bressoni (Taylor, 1939) – Michoacán slender blind snake
- Rena dugesii (Bocourt, 1881) – Dugès's threadsnake
- Rena dulcis Baird & Girard, 1853 – Texas blind snake
- Rena humilis Baird & Girard, 1853 – western threadsnake
- Rena iversoni (H.M. Smith, van Breukelen, Auth & Chiszar, 1998)
- Rena klauberi Flores-Villela, E.N. Smith, Canseco-Márquez & Campbell, 2022
- Rena maxima (Loveridge, 1932) – giant blind snake
- Rena segrega (Klauber, 1939) – Trans-Pecos blind snake
- Rena unguirostris (Boulenger, 1902) – southern blind snake

Nota bene: A binomial authority in parentheses indicates that the species was originally described in a genus other than Rena.

== Etymologies ==
The specific name, dugesii, is in honor of Mexican zoologist Alfredo Dugès.

The specific name, iversoni, is in honor of American herpetologist John B. Iverson.
