= Michoacán slender blind snake =

Conservation status
- Data Deficient (IUCN 3.1)

Scientific classification
- Kingdom: Animalia
- Phylum: Chordata
- Class: Reptilia
- Order: Squamata
- Suborder: Serpentes
- Family: Leptotyphlopidae
- Genus: Rena
- Species: R. bressoni

Binomial name
- Rena bressoni (Taylor, 1939)

Synonyms
- Leptotyphlops bressoni Taylor, 1939; Rena bressoni — Adalsteinsson et al., 2009

Species of snake

The Michoacán slender blind snake (Rena bressoni), also known commonly as la culebrilla ciega de Michoacán in Spanish, is a species of snake in the family Leptotyphlopidae. The species is endemic to Michoacán, Mexico.

== Etymology ==
The specific name, bressoni, is in honor of Julio Raymond Bresson, who collected the type specimen.

== Habitat ==
The preferred natural habitat of R. bressoni is forest.

== Behavior ==
R. bressoni is terrestrial and fossorial.

== Reproduction ==
R. bressoni is oviparous.
