= Western North American Naturalist =

- Discipline: Natural history
- Language: English
- Edited by: Mark C. Belk (Brigham Young University)

Publication details
- Former name: Great Basin Naturalist
- History: 1939–present
- Publisher: Monte L. Bean Life Science Museum (United States)
- Frequency: Quarterly
- Open access: Delayed (after 24 months)
- Impact factor: 0.311 (2016)

Standard abbreviations
- ISO 4: West. N. Am. Nat.

Indexing
- CODEN: WNANF5
- ISSN: 1527-0904 (print); 1944-8341 (web)
- LCCN: sn99009407
- OCLC no.: 150024875

Links
- Journal homepage; Online access; Online archive

Western North American Naturalist, formerly The Great Basin Naturalist, is a peer-reviewed scientific journal focusing on biodiversity and conservation of western North America. The journal's geographic coverage includes "from northernmost Canada and Alaska to southern Mexico, and from the Mississippi River to the Pacific Ocean." Established in 1939, it is published by the Monte L. Bean Life Science Museum (Brigham Young University). The journal is published quarterly, with monographs published irregularly in Monographs of the Western North American Naturalist.

== History ==
Vasco M. Tanner founded the magazine after a term as editor at Proceedings magazine. His hope for the journal was to have a publication that covered a wide range of biology-related topics in addition to having a place to publish his own research. From 1939 through 1966, the journal limited the publication of their issues to once or twice a year due to World War II. Franklin Harris encouraged the journal to continue publication, and it was one of the first journals to be used "for exchange purposes" by university libraries. From 1967 on, the journal published quarterly issues. Tanner served as editor of the Great Basin Naturalist until 1970. Steven Wood, Tanner's successor as editor, established an editorial board for the journal. The board allowed for the journal to utilize an improved peer review process.

In 1975, the journal moved its editorial offices to the Monte L. Bean Life Science Museum. In 1976, articles too long for publication in the journal started being published in The Great Basin Naturalist Memoirs series. In 1990, Jim Barnes succeeded Steven Wood as editor. The journal's editor changed again in 1994 to Richard Baumann. In 1999, the publication of The Great Basin Naturalist ended. The journal's title changed to Western North American Naturalist, which started publishing in 2000. In 2006, Mark C. Belk became the journal's new editor. Belk was still the editor in 2017.

== Impact ==
According to Journal Citation Reports, Western North American Naturalist had an impact factor of 0.311 and ranked 147 of 153 in Ecology category in 2016.
