= Isla San Martín =

- Location within Mexico

Geography
- Location: Gulf of California
- Coordinates: 30°29′20.07″N 116°06′50.61″W
- Highest elevation: 125 m (410 ft)

Administration
- Mexico
- State: Baja California

Demographics
- Population: uninhabited

Isla San Martín is an island in the Pacific Ocean west of the Baja California Peninsula. The island is uninhabited and is part of the Ensenada Municipality.

== Biology ==
Isla San Martín has six species of reptiles: Anniella geronimensis (Baja California legless lizard), Diadophis punctatus (ring-necked snake), Elgaria multicarinata (southern alligator lizard), Hypsiglena ochrorhynchus (coast night snake), Pituophis catenifer (gopher snake), and Uta stansburiana (common side-blotched lizard).

Formerly, the San Martin Island woodrat lived on the island, until it became extinct due to predation by feral cats.
