= Hypsiglena tanzeri =

Conservation status
- Data Deficient (IUCN 3.1)

Scientific classification
- Kingdom: Animalia
- Phylum: Chordata
- Class: Reptilia
- Order: Squamata
- Suborder: Serpentes
- Family: Colubridae
- Genus: Hypsiglena
- Species: H. tanzeri

Binomial name
- Hypsiglena tanzeri Dixon & Lieb, 1972

Species of snake

Hypsiglena tanzeri, the Rio Verde night snake or Tanzer's night snake, is a species of snake in the family Colubridae. The species is native to Mexico.
