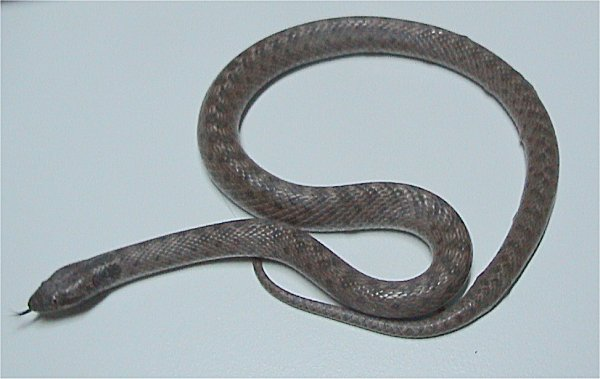

Conservation status
- Least Concern (IUCN 3.1)

Scientific classification
- Kingdom: Animalia
- Phylum: Chordata
- Class: Reptilia
- Order: Squamata
- Suborder: Serpentes
- Family: Colubridae
- Genus: Hypsiglena
- Species: H. jani

Binomial name
- Hypsiglena jani (Dugès, 1865)
- The distribution of Hypsiglena jani (brown), which now includes the two former subspecies Hypsiglena torquata dunklei (orange), and Hypsiglena torquata texana (yellow).

Synonyms
- Liophis janii Dugès, 1865; Hypsiglena texana Stejneger, 1893; Hypsiglena ochrorhynchus texana — Steneger & Barbour, 1917; Hypsiglena torquata dunklei Taylor, 1938; Hypsiglena torquata texana — A.H. Wright & A.A. Wright, 1957; Hypsiglena ochrorhynchus janii — W.W. Tanner, 1944; Hypsiglena torquata jani — Crother, 2000; Hypsiglena jani — Mulcahy, 2007

= Hypsiglena jani =

Species of snake

Hypsiglena jani, commonly known as the Texas night snake or the Chihuahuan night snake, is a small species of mildly venomous snake in the subfamily Dipsadinae of the family Colubridae. The species is native to the southwestern United States and adjacent northeastern Mexico.

== Etymology ==
The epithet, jani, is in honor of Italian taxonomist Giorgio Jan.

== Description ==
H. jani grows from 10 to 16 inches (25 to 41 centimetres) in total length (including tail), record 20 inches (51 cm). It is typically a light gray or tan in color, with dark brown or dark gray blotching down the back, and has an unmarked underside. It has smooth dorsal scales. The eye has a vertically elliptical pupil. H. jani is rear-fanged, and is considered to be venomous, though it is not dangerous to humans.

== Behavior ==
As the common names imply, H. jani is a primarily nocturnal snake.

== Diet ==
The diet of H. jani consists of primarily lizards, but it will also eat smaller snakes and occasionally soft bodied insects.

== Habitat ==
H. jani prefers semi-arid habitats with rocky soils.

== Reproduction ==
H. jani is an oviparous species that breeds in the spring rainy season, laying 4–6 eggs that take approximately 8 weeks to incubate before hatching. The eggs average 27 mm (1.1 in) long by 10 mm (3/8 in) wide. The hatchlings are about 15 cm (5.9 in) in total length.

== Geographic range ==
H. jani ranges from southern Kansas to southern Colorado, and south throughout New Mexico, the western half of Texas to central Mexico.

== Subspecies ==
Three subspecies are recognized as being valid, including the nominotypical subspecies.

- Hypsiglena jani dunklei Taylor, 1938
- Hypsiglena jani jani (Dugès, 1865)
- Hypsiglena jani texana Stejneger, 1893

Nota bene: A trinomial authority in parentheses indicates that the subspecies was originally described in a genus other than Hypsiglena.
