= Southern blind snake =

Conservation status
- Least Concern (IUCN 3.1)

Scientific classification
- Kingdom: Animalia
- Phylum: Chordata
- Class: Reptilia
- Order: Squamata
- Suborder: Serpentes
- Family: Leptotyphlopidae
- Genus: Rena
- Species: R. unguirostris

Binomial name
- Rena unguirostris (Boulenger, 1902)

Synonyms
- Glauconia unguirostris Boulenger, 1902; Leptotyphlops unguirostris — Cei, 1993; Rena unguirostris — Adalsteinsson et al., 2009; Siagonodon unguirostris — Wallach et al., 2014; Rena unguirostris — Cacciali et al., 2016

Species of snake

The southern blind snake (Rena unguirostris) is a species of snake in the family Leptotyphlopidae. The species is endemic to South America.

== Geographic range ==
R. unguirostris is found in Argentina, Bolivia, and Paraguay.

== Reproduction ==
R. unguirostris is oviparous.
