= Hypsiglena affinis =

Scientific classification
- Kingdom: Animalia
- Phylum: Chordata
- Class: Reptilia
- Order: Squamata
- Suborder: Serpentes
- Family: Colubridae
- Genus: Hypsiglena
- Species: H. affinis

Binomial name
- Hypsiglena affinis Boulenger, 1894

Species of snake

Hypsiglena affinis is a species of snake in the family Colubridae. The species is native to Mexico.
