= Giant blind snake =

Conservation status
- Least Concern (IUCN 3.1)

Scientific classification
- Kingdom: Animalia
- Phylum: Chordata
- Class: Reptilia
- Order: Squamata
- Suborder: Serpentes
- Family: Leptotyphlopidae
- Genus: Rena
- Species: R. maxima

Binomial name
- Rena maxima (Loveridge, 1932)

Synonyms
- Leptotyphlops maximus Loveridge, 1932; Rena maxima — Adalsteinsson et al., 2009

Species of snake

The giant blind snake (Rena maxima) is a species of snake in the family Leptotyphlopidae. The species is endemic to Mexico.

== Geographic range ==
R. maxima is found in the Mexican states of Guerrero, Morelos, Oaxaca, and Puebla.

== Description ==
The largest recorded specimen of R. maxima is a female with a snout-to-vent length (SVL) of 33 cm (13 in) plus a tail 1.8 cm (0.71 in) long.

== Reproduction ==
R. maxima is oviparous. Clutch size may be as large as seven eggs.
