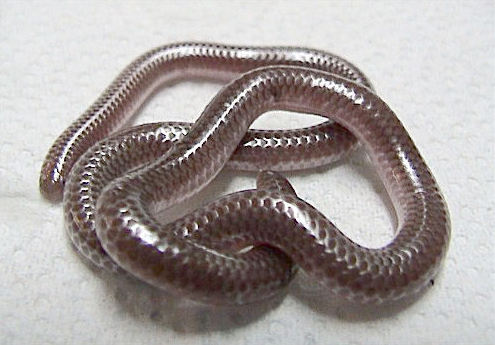

Conservation status
- Least Concern (IUCN 3.1)

Scientific classification
- Kingdom: Animalia
- Phylum: Chordata
- Class: Reptilia
- Order: Squamata
- Suborder: Serpentes
- Family: Leptotyphlopidae
- Genus: Rena
- Species: R. dulcis

Binomial name
- Rena dulcis Baird & Girard, 1853
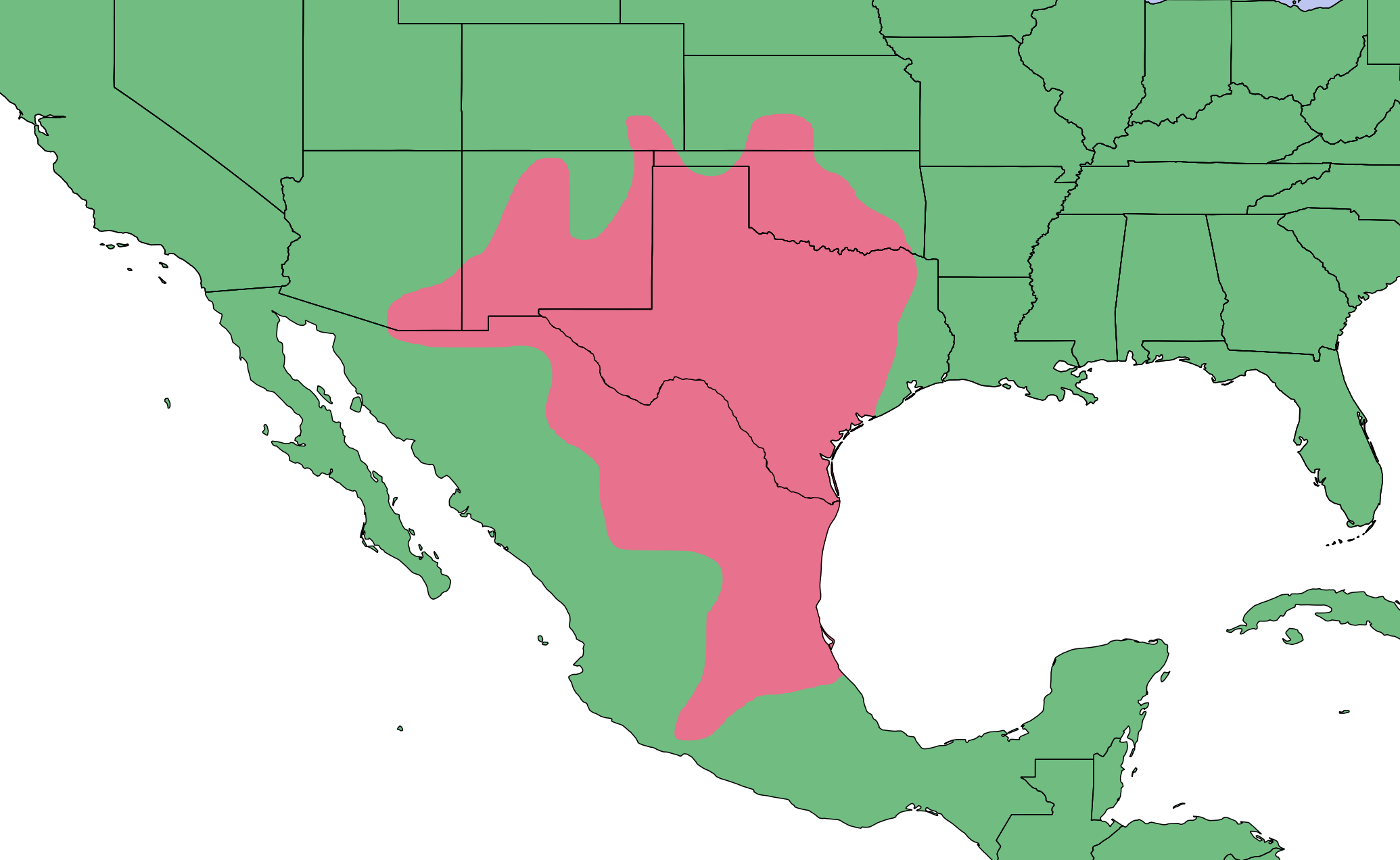

Synonyms
- Rena dulcis Baird & Girard, 1853; Stenostoma dulce — Cope, 1861; St[enostoma]. dulce — Jan & Sordelli, 1861; Stenostoma rubellum Garman, 1884; Leptotyphlops dulcis — Stejneger, 1891; Glauconia dulcis — Cope, 1892; Glauconia dulcis — Boulenger, 1893; Leptotyphlops dulcis dulcis — Klauber, 1940; Leptotyphlops dulcis — Hahn, 1980; Rena dulcis — Adalsteinsson et al., 2009

= Rena dulcis =

Species of snake

Rena dulcis, also known commonly as the Texas blind snake, the Texas slender blind snake, or the Texas threadsnake, is a species of snake in the family Leptotyphlopidae. The species is endemic to the Southwestern United States and adjacent northern Mexico. Three subspecies are currently recognized, including the nominate subspecies described here.

== Description ==
The Texas blind snake appears much like a shiny earthworm. It is pinkish-brown (puce) in color with a deep sheen to its scales. It appears not to be segmented. The eyes are no more than two dark dots under the head scales. The upper jaw contains no teeth, and the lower jaw is incredibly short (less than half the length of the skull). When ingesting prey, the snake flexes the front of its short lower jaw quickly in a raking motion to fling prey into its esophagus, a technique unique to the family Leptotyphlopidae.

Adults can grow to approximately 27 cm (11 in) in total length, including the tail.

On the top of the head, between the ocular scales, L. dulcis has three scales (L. humilis has one scale).

== Behavior ==
R. dulcis is terrestrial, fossorial, and secretive.

The Texas blind snake spends the vast majority of its time buried in loose soil, only emerging to feed or when it rains and its habitat floods with water. It is often found after spring rains and mistaken for an earthworm. If handled it usually squirms around and tries to poke the tip of its tail into the handler. This is a completely harmless maneuver and likely serves as a distractive measure. The mouth is far too small to effectively bite a human being.

Commensal behavior has been observed with the eastern screech owl in which the owl carries live Texas blind snakes back to the nest, where the snakes help to clean the nest of parasites.

== Diet ==
The diet of R. dulcis consists primarily of termite and ant larvae.

== Reproduction ==
R. dulcis is oviparous.

== Common names ==
Common names for R. dulcis include the following: burrowing snake, eastern worm snake, plains blind snake, Texas blind snake, Texas Rena, Texas slender blind snake, Texas threadsnake, Texas worm snake, worm snake.

== Geographic range ==
R. dulcis is found in the southwestern United States and northern Mexico. In the USA it occurs in southwestern Kansas, western Oklahoma including the panhandle, central and southern Texas, west through southern New Mexico. In northern Mexico it has been reported in Chihuahua, Coahuila, Tamaulipas, Nuevo León, San Luis Potosí, Veracruz, Querétaro, Hidalgo, and Puebla.

The type locality given by Baird and Girard is "Between San Pedro and Camanche [sic] Springs, Tex." (Comanche Springs, Texas).

== Habitat ==
R. dulcis is found in a variety of habitats including desert, grassland, shrubland, savanna, and forest.

== Conservation ==
Gauging wild blind snake populations is virtually impossible due to their secretive nature. However, like many other native Texas species, R. dulcis is known to be detrimentally affected by the red imported fire ant.

== Subspecies ==
The following three subspecies are recognized as being valid.

- Rena dulcis dulcis Baird & Girard, 1853
- Rena dulcis rubellum (Garman, 1884)
- Rena dulcis supraorbicularis (W. Tanner, 1985)

Nota bene: A trinomial authority in parentheses indicates that the subspecies was originally described in a genus other than Rena.
