= Rena boettgeri =

Scientific classification
- Kingdom: Animalia
- Phylum: Chordata
- Class: Reptilia
- Order: Squamata
- Suborder: Serpentes
- Family: Leptotyphlopidae
- Genus: Rena
- Species: R. boettgeri

Binomial name
- Rena boettgeri (F. Werner, 1899)

Synonyms
- Glauconia Boettgeri F. Werner, 1899; Leptotyphlops humilis boettgeri — H.M. Smith & Larsen, 1974; Rena boettgeri — Adalsteinsson et al., 2009

Species of reptile

Rena boettgeri, also known commonly as the Baja California Cape wormsnake and the Cerralvo Island threadsnake, is a species of snake in the family Leptotyphlopidae. The species is endemic to Baja California, Mexico.

== Geographic range ==
The Cerralvo Island threadsnake is found in the Cape Region of Baja California Sur. This species appears to be absent from the higher elevations of the Sierra La Laguna. It is also found on Isla Cerralvo in the Municipality of La Paz.

== Etymology ==
R. boettgeri is named in honor of German herpetologist Oskar Boettger.

== Description ==
R. boettgeri has the following scalation. The rostral is rounded at the back, taking up about 1/3 the width of the head and almost reaching between the eyes. The nasal is completely divided, with the nostril near the rostral. The ocular reaches the edge of the upper lip between two supralabials, the front of which is just as high but narrower than the rear. There are 4 lower lip shields. There are 14 scales around the body. The body diameter is included 75 times in total length, and the tail length 20 times. Dorsally, the body is monochrome red-brown, and ventrally it is a little lighter. The total length is 225 mm (8.9 in), the tail length is 11 mm (0.43 in), and the diameter of the body is 3 mm (0.12 in).

== Reproduction ==
R. boettgeri reproduces via sexual reproduction.
