= Vasco M. Tanner =

American entomologist (1892–1989)

- Born: October 29, 1892; Payson, Utah, U.S.
- Died: April 25, 1989 (aged 96); Provo, Utah, U.S.
- Education: Stanford University (PhD, 1925); University of Utah (M.S., 1920); Brigham Young University (A.B., 1915)
- Scientific career
- Fields: Entomology
- Workplaces: Brigham Young University
- Thesis: A preliminary study of the genitalia of female Coleoptera (1925)
- Doctoral advisor: G. F. Ferris

Vasco Myron Tanner (October 29, 1892 – April 25, 1989) was an American entomologist from Utah, professor of zoology, and chair of the zoology and entomology departmentat Brigham Young University (BYU). Tanner also taught at Dixie College while he did research. He published over 140 scientific articles, mostly focusing on insects, but also researching birds, mammals, reptiles and fishes. He also founded the journal The Great Basin Naturalist. Tanner was a part of numerous entomology recreational societies and worked to reduce flood risk as chair of the forestry and flood control committee with Provo's Chamber of Commerce. Tanner created and funded an award at Dixie College, which still exists today. He also donated money to create an entomological research fund at the college. He has numerous insect species named after him because of his research in the field.

== Early life ==
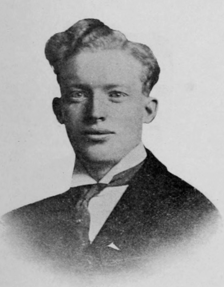
Tanner in the 1914 Brigham Young University yearbook

Vasco Myron Tanner was born to John Myron and Lois Ann Stevens Tanner on October 29, 1892, in Payson, Utah. He spent his childhood in farms in Indianola and Fairview, Utah. His younger brother Wilmer Webster Tanner became a noted herpetologist. In 1909, at age 17, he moved to Provo, living with extended family while he attended Brigham Young High School for two years. He finished high school at the newly established North Sanpete High School.

== College and teaching ==
In 1912, he attended college at Brigham Young University for three years, where he majored in biology. He received a scholarship which paid for two years of his tuition there. He graduated from Brigham Young University in 1915.

Tanner finished coursework for his master's degree in geology from the University of Utah in 1916. While he was writing his thesis on the deltas of Lake Bonneville, he taught at Dixie Junior College in St. George, Utah. Tanner helped Ernest M. Hall collect some of the first specimens in Dixie College's botany collection. Tanner officially graduated from the University of Utah in 1920.

Also in 1920, Tanner went back to Dixie College to teach after supervising agricultural projects in Moroni for two years and became a state crop pest inspector for Washington County, Kane County, and Iron County. He began work on his PhD at Stanford in the summers of 1921 and 1923, where David Starr Jordan, then president of Stanford, befriended him and convinced him to study entomology. He earned his PhD from Stanford in 1925 in zoology and entomology with G. F. Ferris as his dissertation adviser. Tanner's dissertation was on the morphology of the genitalia of female beetles. Later, in 1925, he accepted an appointment to be a professor of zoology and entomology at Brigham Young University and chairman of the same department.

== Brigham Young University and civic work ==
Tanner was the chair of the zoology and entomology department until 1958. He helped construct a lakeside biological laboratory where the Provo River empties into Utah Lake, where he and his students studied fish and birds. He founded, published, and edited The Great Basin Naturalist starting in 1939, through which he published many of his own papers. Tanner studied beetles, especially darkling beetles and weevils, as well as herpetology and natural history of the Great Basin. By 1970, he had described around 65 species and one genus of beetles, and was commemorated in the scientific names of five species. He directed the research of 48 graduate students, and published nearly 150 articles. The university's insect collection doubled from 300,000 insects to over 650,000 between 1951 and 1971 when he helped collect specimens for the university.

His students praised his dedication to encourage individual students and his passion for zoology. In 1972, he received the Karl G. Maeser award for teaching excellence. He was a fellow of the Royal Entomological Society and the Entomological Society of America. While Tanner stopped teaching at age 78 in 1970, he continued work as a curator of entomology until 1981.

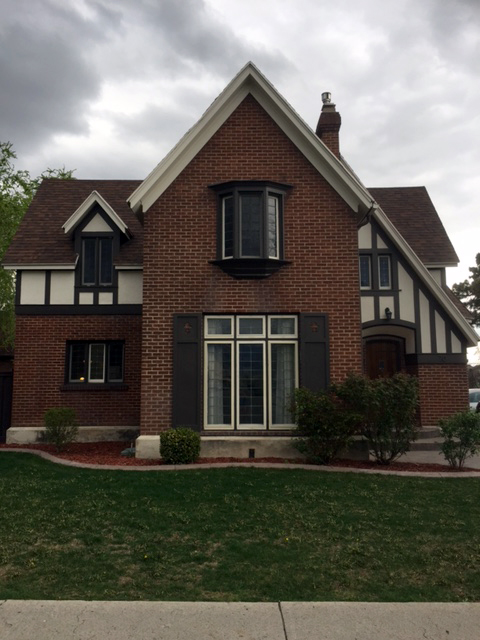
In 1932, the Tanners built a home in Provo at 70 E 800 N designed by Joe Nelson

Tanner served for 35 years as chairman of the forestry and flood control committee in Provo's Chamber of Commerce. As part of his work to reduce flood risk, he oversaw terracing, development of recreational facilities, and cessation of mountain grazing and planting of grasses in the Provo Canyon and surrounding areas. He was also chairman of the city utilities board for 20 years. There is an electrical substation named after him at the mouth of the Provo Canyon, which reduced blackouts in Provo. Tanner was a member of the Utah state parks and recreation commission for four years, and was president of the Sons of the Utah Pioneers for three years. He was secretary and editor for the Utah Academy of Arts and Sciences for 12 years. He was a Democratic state congressman candidate in 1964.

== Family life and legacy ==
Tanner met his wife, Annie Atkin, at Dixie College the first year he taught there. They were married on June 7, 1917. They had five children together. The Tanners also helped raise Ahmed Shayesteh from age ten, at the request of Ahmed's father, United States Minister from Iran, and BYU President Franklin S. Harris. On family camping trips, Vasco still prioritized specimen collection, enlisting his children to aid his search for new desert species. Annie wrote that "in the mind of a zoologist, the female of the species is only important for the part she plays in reproducing the species. This part I have played."

When Annie Atkin Tanner died in 1972, Vasco gave $2000 to create the Annie Atkin Tanner literary award at Dixie College. Most recently in 2015, Vasco's son Jordan Tanner gave an endowment to Dixie to continue the award, which members of the Tanner family judge. Also in 1972, Tanner donated $10,000 to establish a curatorial entomological research fund. Tanner is commemorated in the names of several insect species, including Utabaenetes tanneri, Eschatomoxys tanneri, Cicindela repanda tanneri, and the weevils Bagous tanneri and Sitona tanneri.
