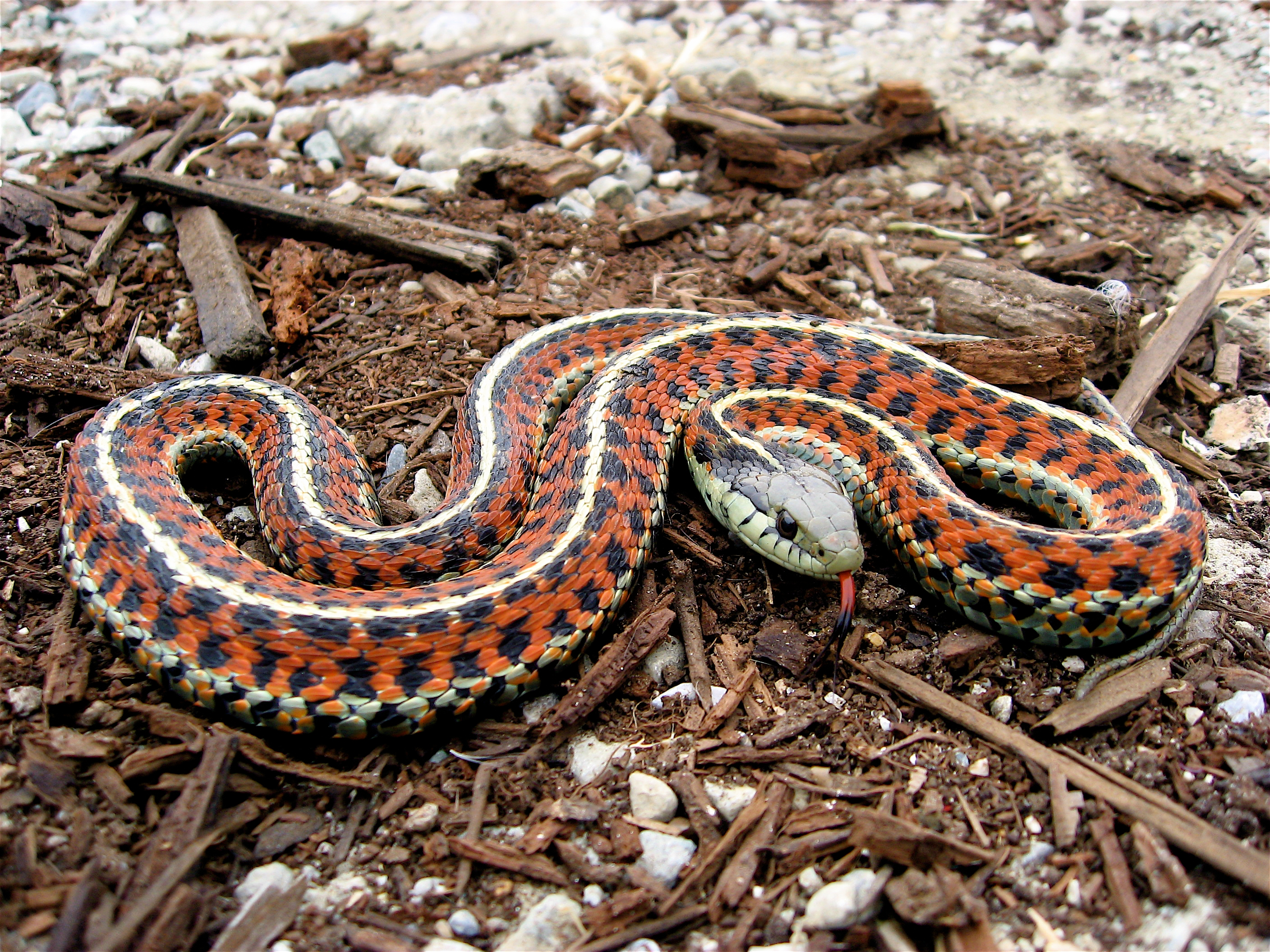
- T. elegans terrestris

Conservation status
- Least Concern (IUCN 3.1)

Scientific classification
- Kingdom: Animalia
- Phylum: Chordata
- Class: Reptilia
- Order: Squamata
- Suborder: Serpentes
- Family: Colubridae
- Genus: Thamnophis
- Species: T. elegans

Binomial name
- Thamnophis elegans (Baird & Girard, 1853)

Subspecies
- 6 sspp., see text
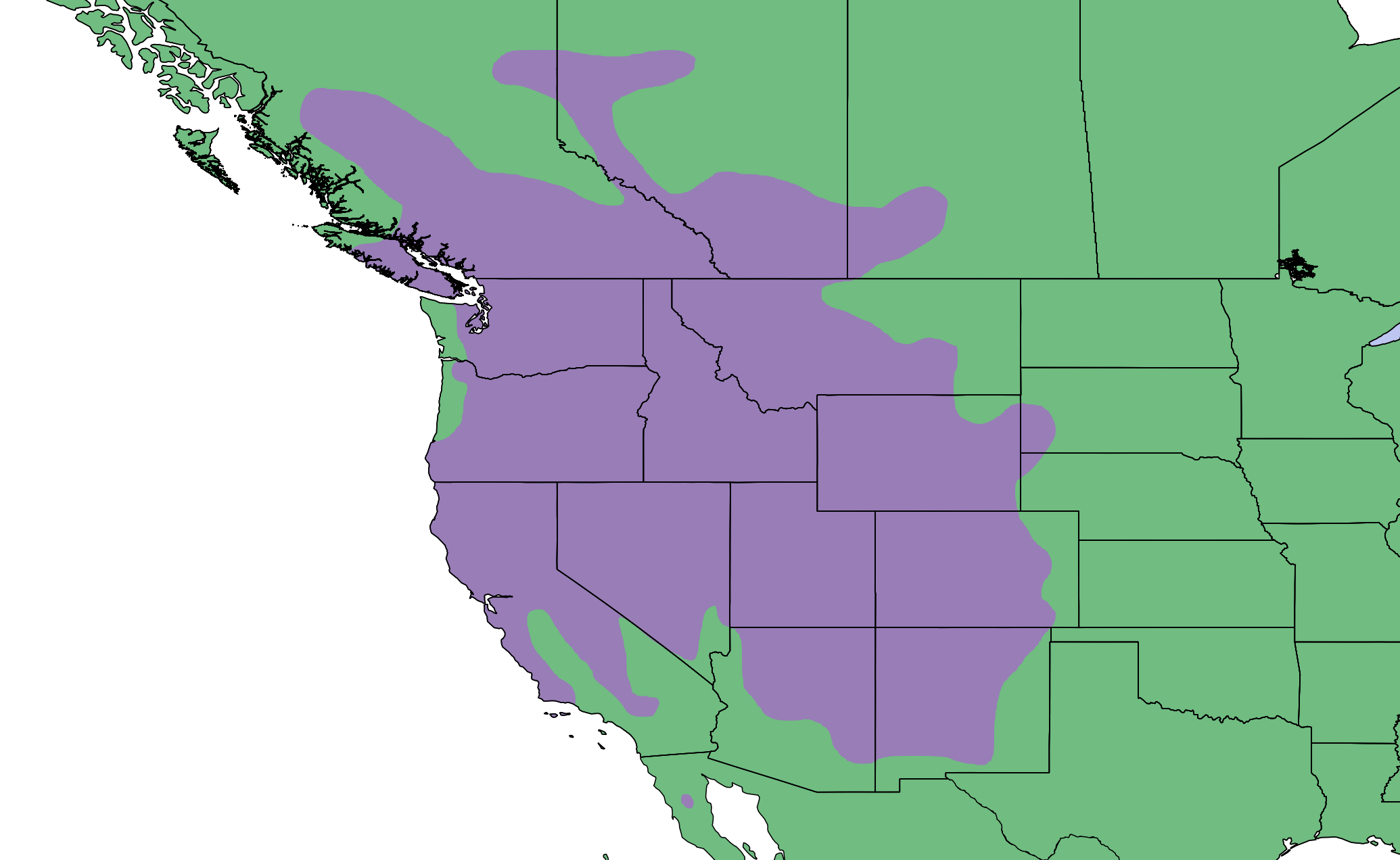

Synonyms
- List: Eutania [sic] elegans Baird & Girard, 1853; Eutaenia elegans – Cope, 1900; Thamnophis ordinoides elegans – Ruthven, 1908; Thamnophis elegans – Zim & H.M. Smith, 1956

= Western terrestrial garter snake =

Species of snake

The western terrestrial garter snake (Thamnophis elegans) is a western North American species of colubrid snake. At least five subspecies are recognized.

== Geographic range ==
Thamnophis elegans is found in central British Columbia, central Alberta, and southwestern Manitoba in Canada. It can be found in the western United States, as far east as western Nebraska and the Oklahoma Panhandle. An isolated population occurs in Baja California, Mexico.

== Subspecies ==
Six subspecies have been identified, although the validity of some of them is debated.

Image	Subspecies	Common name	Geographic Range
	Thamnophis elegans arizonae Tanner & Lowe, 1989	Arizona garter snake	
	Thamnophis elegans elegans (Baird & Girard, 1853)	mountain garter snake	Northern California, western Nevada, and western Oregon.
	Thamnophis elegans hueyi Van Denburgh & Slevin, 1923	San Pedro Mártir garter snake	A small section of Baja California.
	Thamnophis elegans terrestris Fox, 1951	coastal garter snake	Western California, and just barely touching Southwest Oregon.
	Thamnophis elegans vagrans (Baird & Girard, 1853)	wandering garter snake	This covers the most territory of all the subspecies - spanning most of the western United States, and even a large portion of southwest Canada.
	Thamnophis elegans vascotanneri Tanner & Lowe, 1989	Upper Basin garter snake	

== Description ==
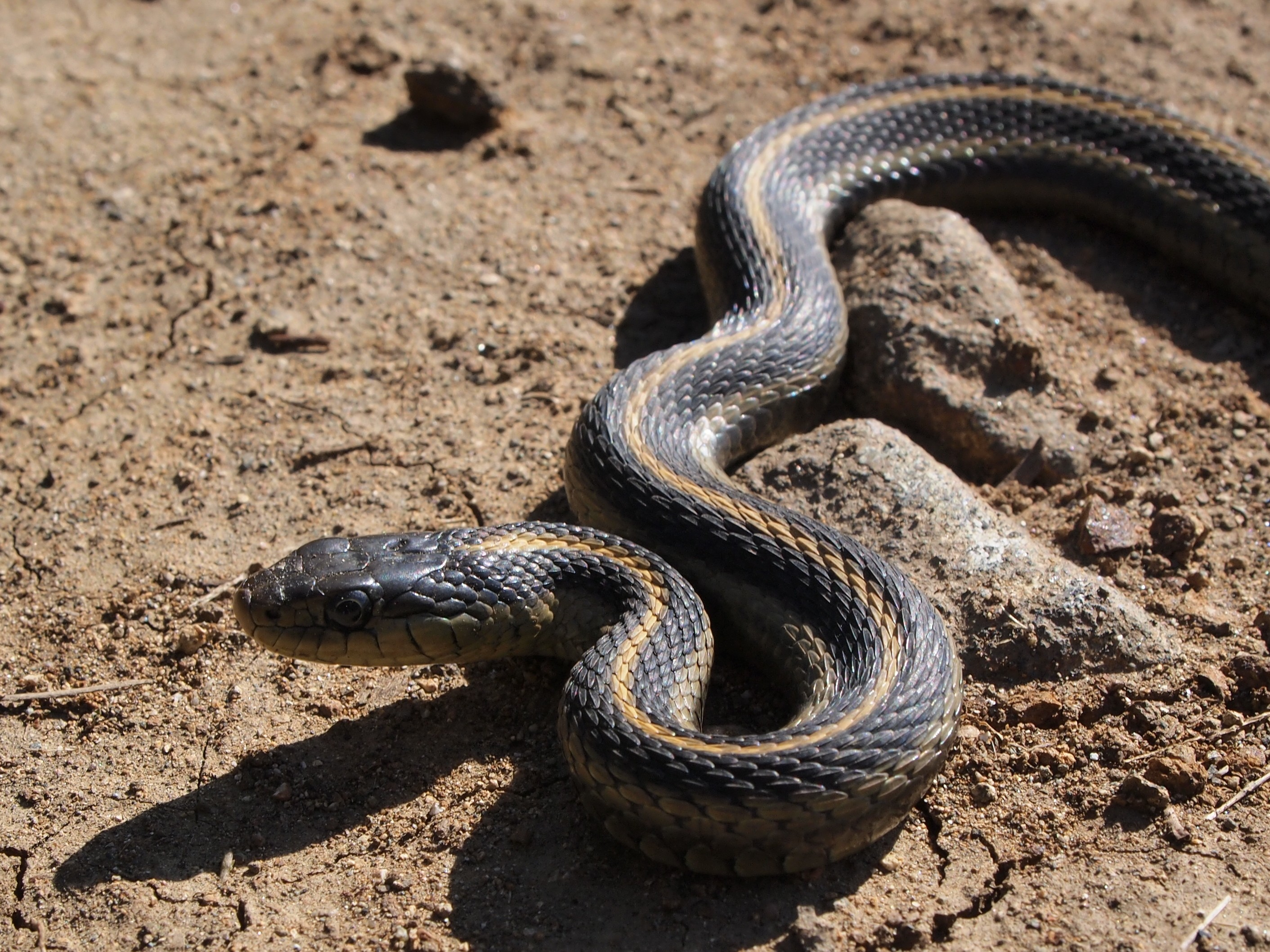
T. e. terrestris with dark coloring

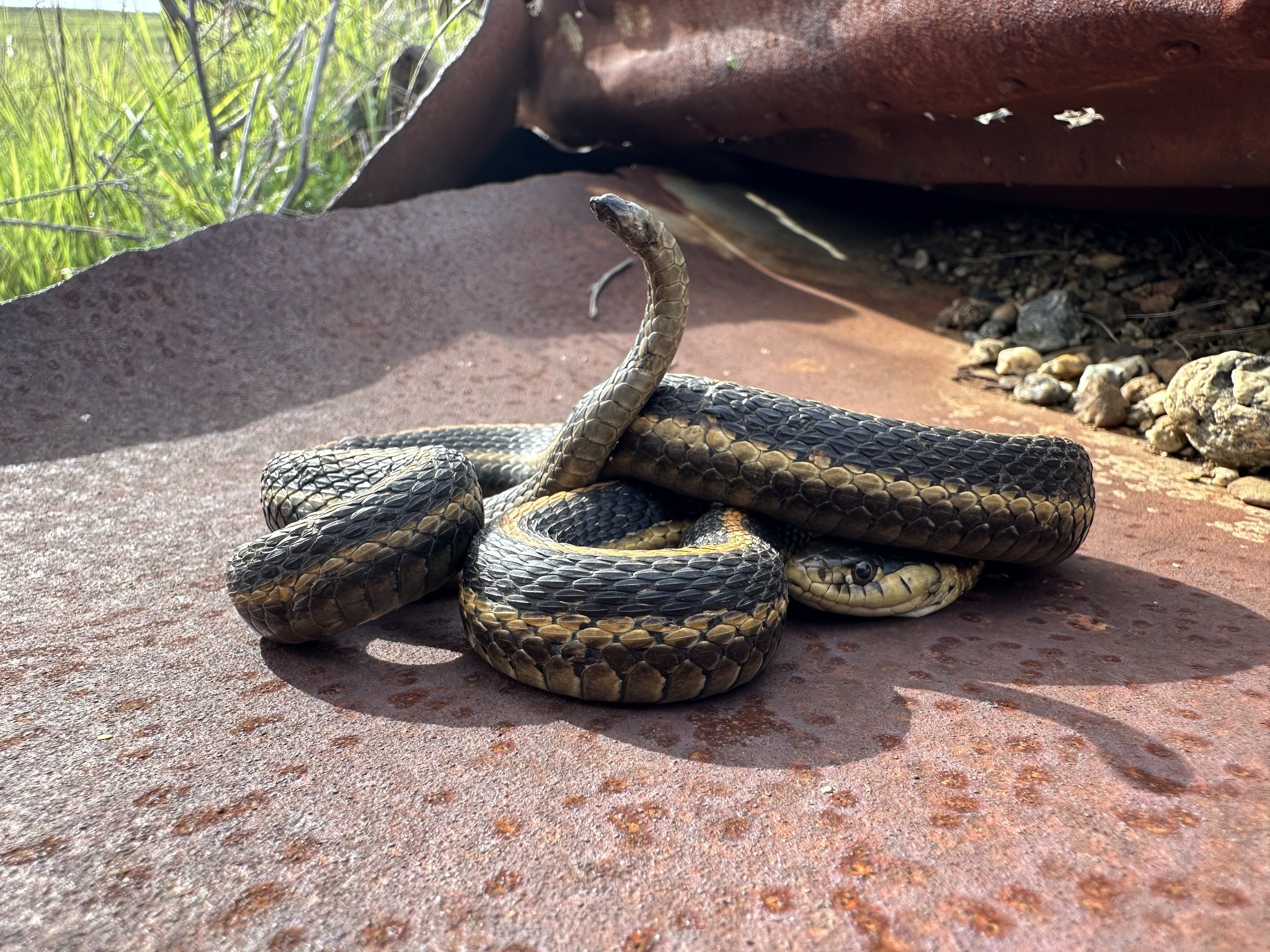
Mountain garter snake (T. e. elegans) defensive posture

Most western terrestrial garter snakes have a yellow, light orange, or white dorsal stripe, accompanied by two stripes of the same color, one on each side. Some varieties have red or black spots between the dorsal stripe and the side stripes. It is an immensely variable species, and even the most experienced herpetologists have trouble with its identification. They are medium-sized snakes, usually 46–104 cm (18–41 in).

Like many species of North American garter snake, the western terrestrial garter snake possesses a mildly venomous saliva. Specimens collected from Idaho and Washington produced venom with myonecrotic (muscle tissue-killing) effects when injected into the gastrocnemius muscles of mice. Several cases of mild human envenomation with local edema and other symptoms (but without any systemic symptoms) have occurred from the wandering garter snake subspecies, including in Colorado.

This species is the only garter snake species with a well-documented tendency to constrict prey, although the constriction is inefficient when compared with the constriction of many other snakes (such as the gopher snake), involving disorganized, loose, and sometimes unstable coils and a longer time required to kill prey. Snakes from Colorado populations of terrestrial garter snakes appear to be more efficient at killing their prey by constriction than those from Pacific Coast populations.

== Habitat ==
Thamnophis elegans occurs in a wide variety of habitats, including grasslands, woodlands, and coniferous forests, from sea level up to 3,962 m (12,999 ft). It is primarily terrestrial, although populations in the Great Basin and Rocky Mountains are semi-aquatic.

== Reproduction ==
The western terrestrial garter snake does not lay eggs, but instead is ovoviviparous, which is characteristic of natricine snakes. Broods of eight to 12 young are born in August and September.

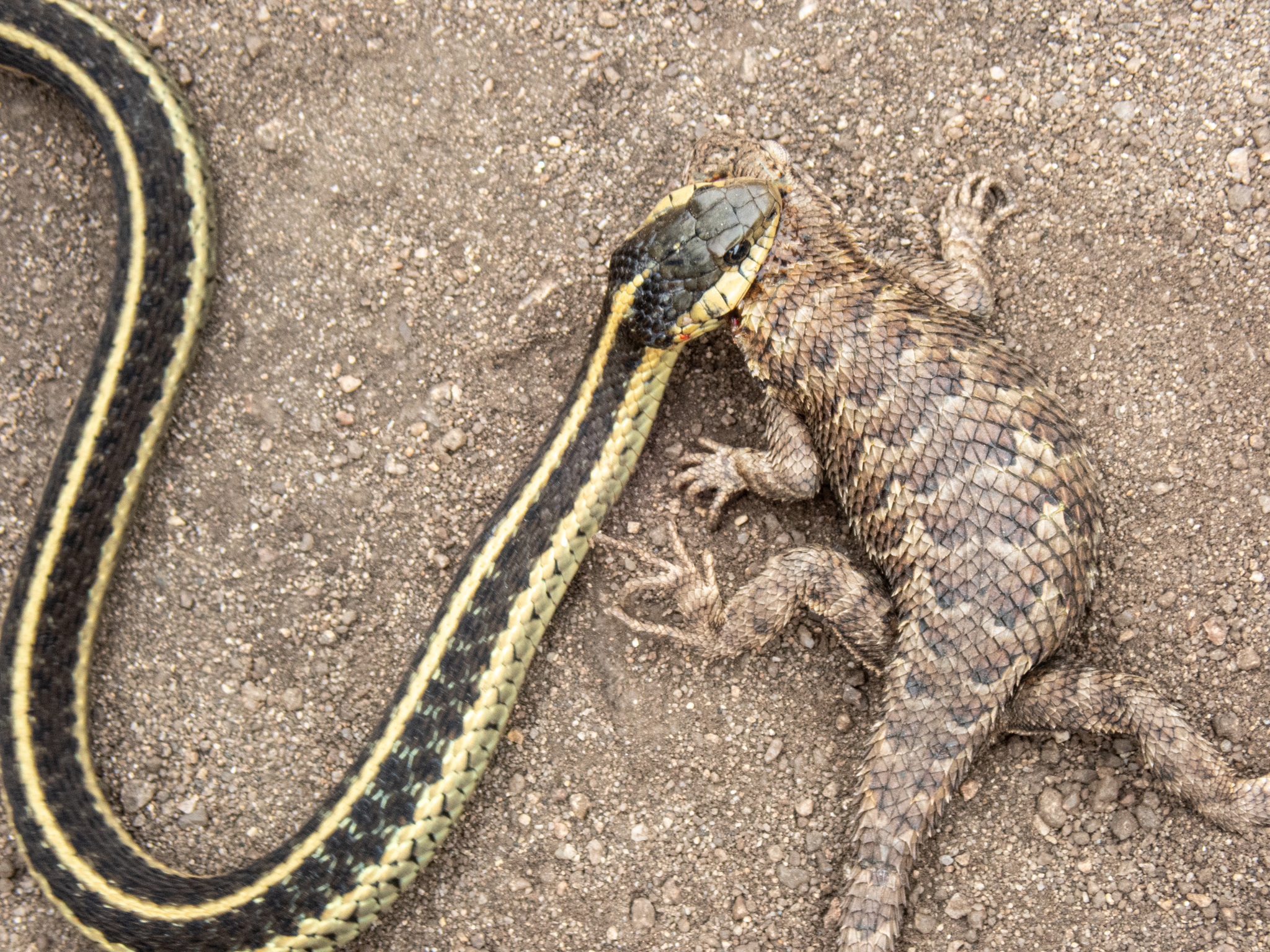
Coastal garter snake (T. e. terrestris) eating a western fence lizard.

== Diet ==
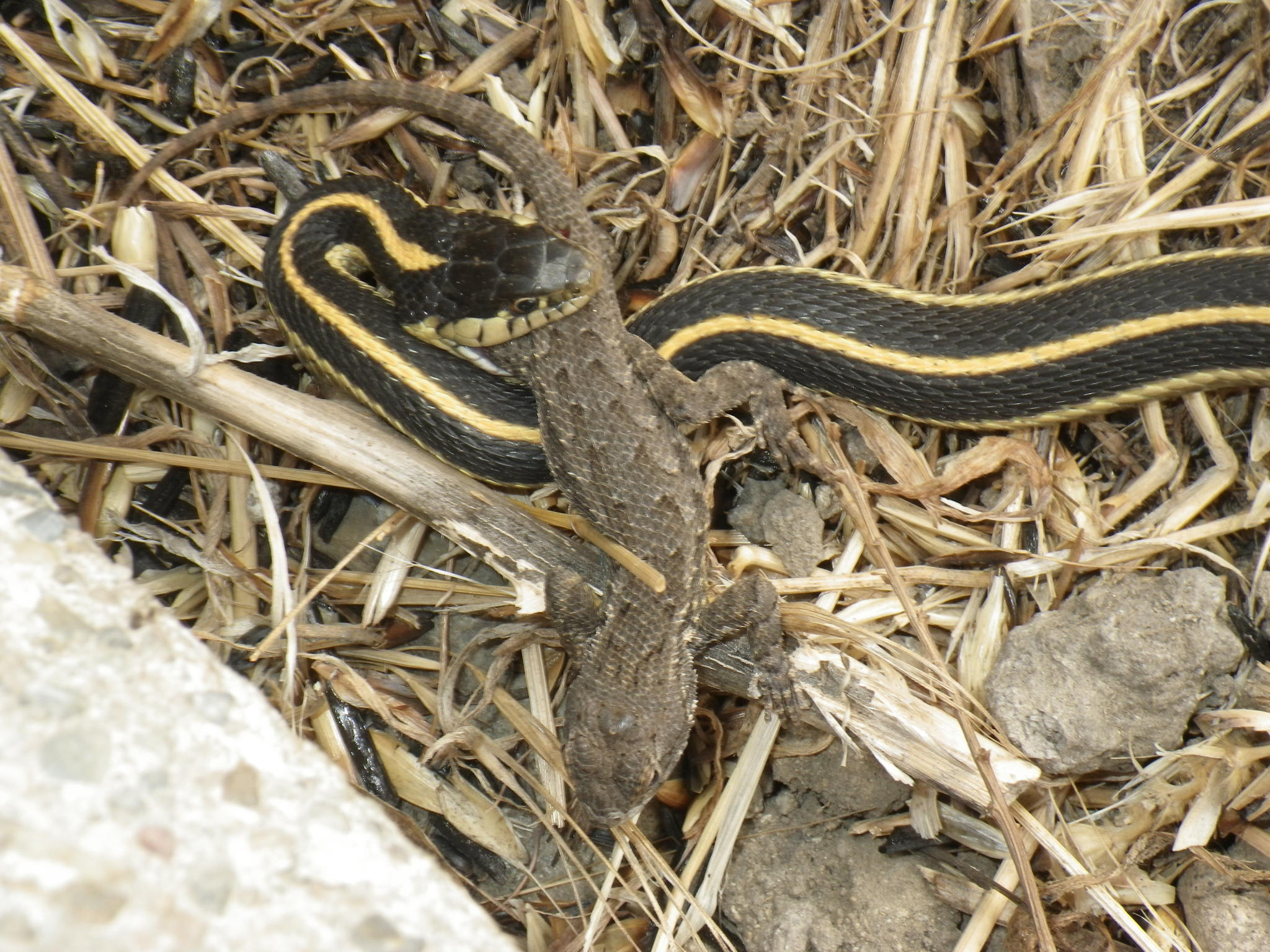
Mountain garter snake (T. e. elegans) eating a western fence lizard

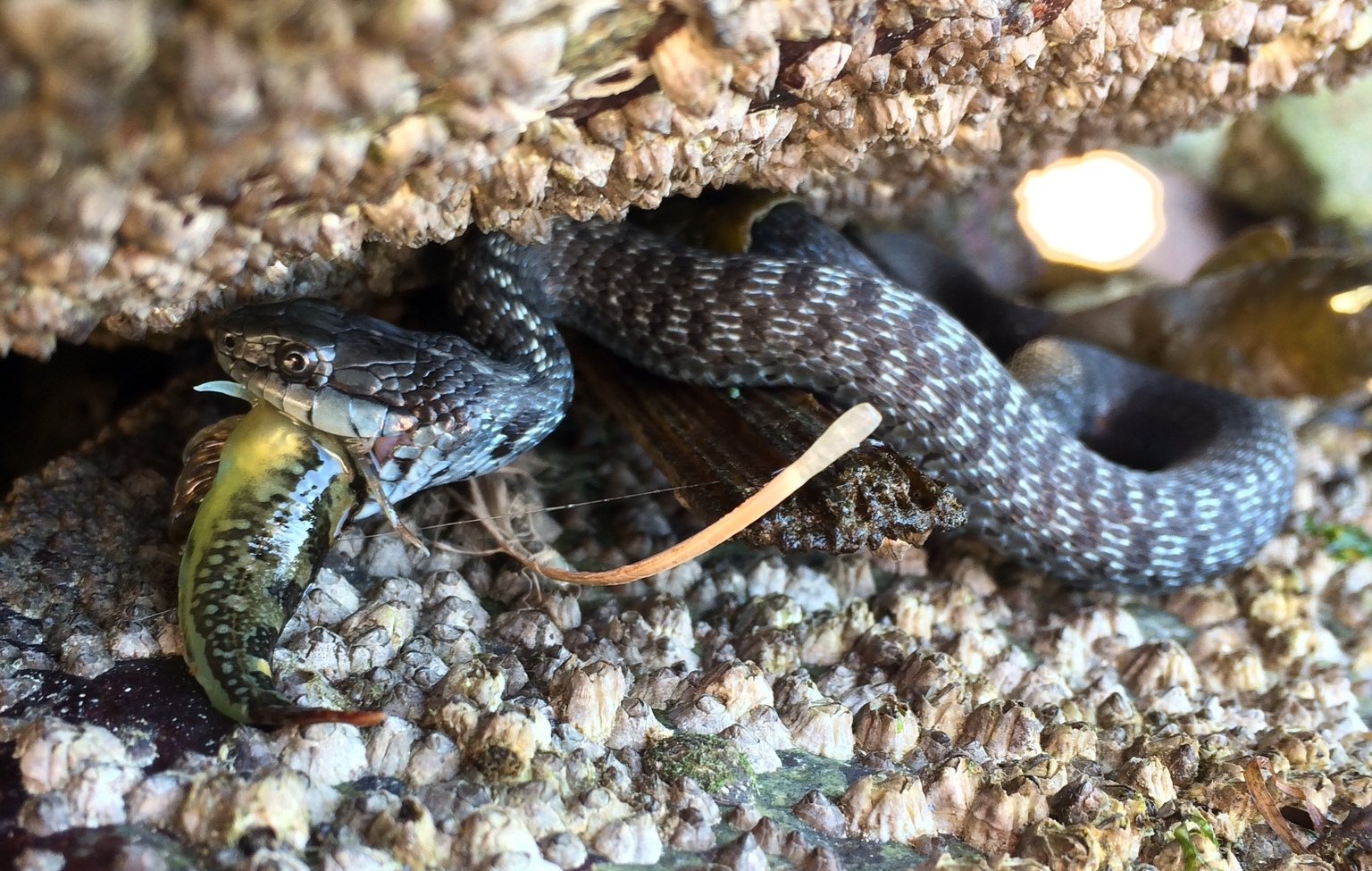
Wandering garter snake (T. e. vagrans) eating a fish.

The diet of Thamnophis elegans depends heavily on the prey available in the local area, and thus varies due to regional geographical differences. This makes the western terrestrial garter snake an excellent example of polyphagism—the adaptation of an organism to maintain a varied diet. There are two main variants that are most prevalent: coastal and inland. As T. elegans is found along the Pacific West Coast of the United States, they will often be seen hunting at or adjacent-to beaches, estuaries, lagoons and marshes along the coast, often at sites where ocean saltwater meets an inland freshwater source (brackish water). Meanwhile, more inland or montane populations are often found adjacent to fresh water sources such as creeks, rivers, streams, ponds, or lakes.

Coastal populations' food sources mainly include terrestrial prey such as earthworms, grubs, caterpillars, crickets, small snails, slugs, salamanders, baby rodents (such as small ground squirrels and other mammals) and small lizards or toads. By comparison, inland and montane populations prefer a far more "amphibious" diet of small frogs, newts, salamanders, toads and their larvae, as well as freshwater leeches, earthworms and small fish. Thus, aquatic food sources are a staple in the inland snake populations' diet.

Coastal snakes are less likely to respond to chemical cues received from fish, which can be inferred by less rapid tongue-flicking when around them. They are also less likely to attack and ingest fish. This preference in diet is so strong that the snake will starve before eating non-preferred prey types. Further, this appears to be genetically determined as this variation in diet is observed in newborn snakes from both populations. When hunting, the Western Garter Snake's actions are chemically and visually mediated on land and in water. Regardless the habitat in which foraging takes place, both ecotypes utilize similar techniques. This consists of attacks that are both aerial and underwater. These include craning, cruising, and diving. However, coastal snakes are less likely to participate these activities.

These differences in diet and foraging behavior between coastal and inland snake populations suggest that the species has undergone microevolution. Due to dietary and foraging differences between variants of T. elegans, it can be inferred that coastal populations have filled a niche in the environment that allows them to no longer rely on fish as a major food source.
