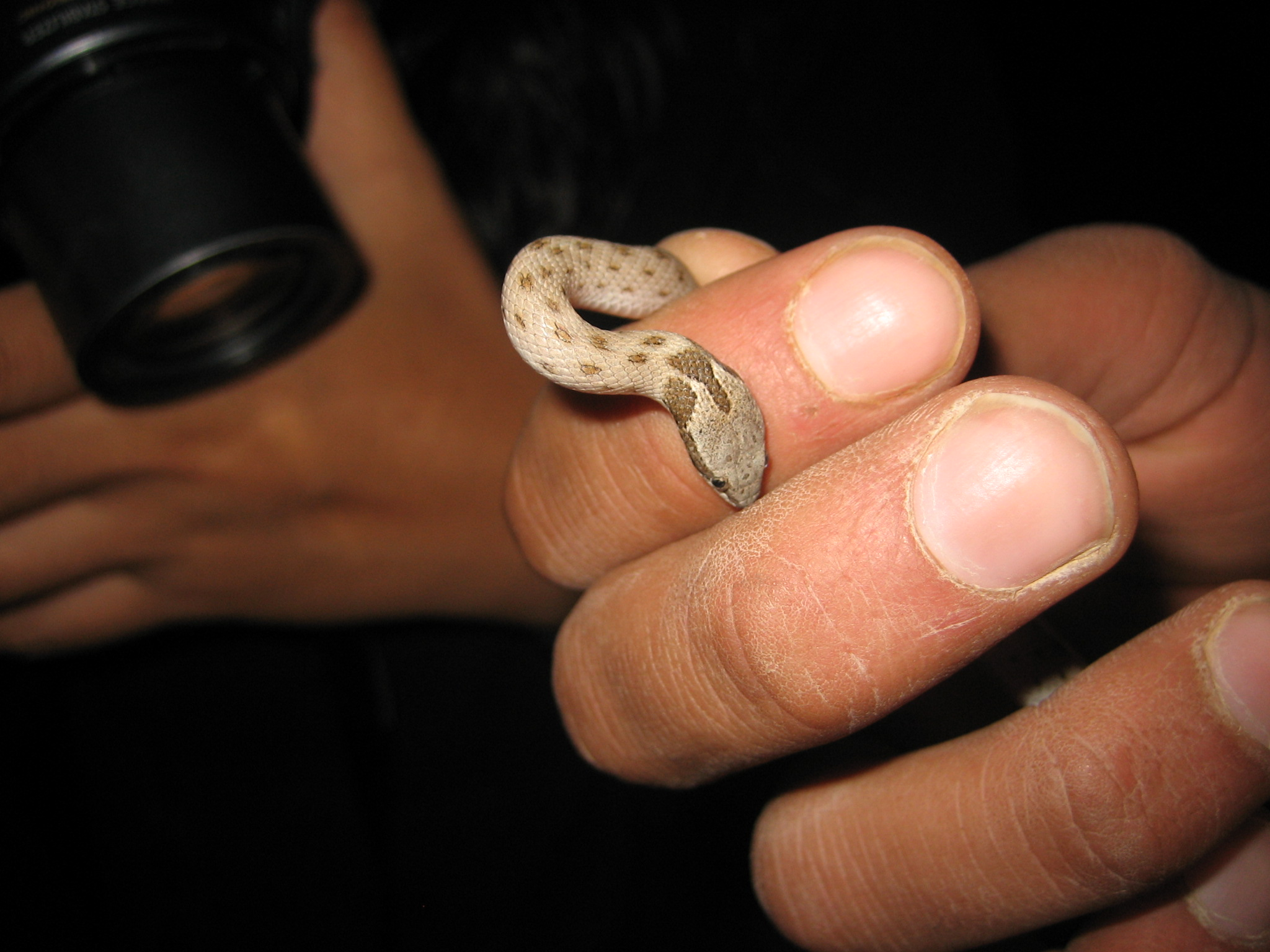
- Night snake held under the glow of a headlamp or flashlight.

Conservation status
- Least Concern (IUCN 3.1)

Scientific classification
- Kingdom: Animalia
- Phylum: Chordata
- Class: Reptilia
- Order: Squamata
- Suborder: Serpentes
- Family: Colubridae
- Genus: Hypsiglena
- Species: H. torquata

Binomial name
- Hypsiglena torquata (Günther, 1860)

Synonyms
- Leptodeira torquata Günther, 1860; Hypsiglena torquata — Boulenger, 1894

= Hypsiglena torquata =

Night snake

Species of snake

Hypsiglena torquata, the Sinaloan night snake, is a species of rear-fanged colubrid. It is endemic western Mexico. It is characterized by dark brown systematic blotches down its back and sides, a bar behind each eye, vertical pupils, and neck adornment. It is active in the twilight and at night. It is not dangerous to humans.

== Morphology and physiology ==
=== Description ===
Total length is 12–26 in (30–66 cm). It is pale gray, light brown, or beige in color, with dark grey or brown blotches on the back and sides. The night snake's head is rather flat and triangular-shaped and usually has a pair of dark brown blotches on the neck. It also has a black or dark brown bar behind the eyes that contrasts against the white or pale gray upper labial scales. It has prominent eyes with vertical pupils. The belly is white or yellowish. Females are usually longer and heavier than males.

=== Venom ===
Although the night snake poses no threat to humans, it is slightly venomous and uses this venom to subdue its prey.

== Distribution and habitat ==
The night snake is endemic to Mexico. Not much is known as far as population densities and exact range due to the highly cryptic nature of the night snake.

The species has also been reported in the Okanagan Valley of British Columbia, Canada since 1980, albeit quite rarely with only about 20 known sightings.

== Ecology ==
=== Behavior ===
Night snakes are known to be both crepuscular (most active at dawn and dusk), and nocturnal. They are usually seen at night while crossing roads, but can be found under rocks, boards, dead branches and other surface litter during the day. Night snakes hibernate during the winter months, and are known to aestivate during periods of the summer. They are generally most active from April to October, with peaks of activity usually occurring in June. If threatened, the night snake may coil up and thrust its coils at the threat, while flattening its head into a triangular defensive shape.

=== Diet ===
Their main prey is lizards. A study in southwestern Idaho found that a related species of night snake's (Hypsiglena chlorophaea) diet consisted mostly of side-blotched lizards (Uta stansburiana) and their eggs. Other prey includes juvenile rattlesnakes and blind snakes, salamanders, frogs, and large insects.

=== Reproduction ===
Night snakes mate in the spring, and females lay a clutch of 2–9 eggs from April to August. Eggs hatch in 7 to 8 weeks, usually in late summer. Males reach sexual maturity after one year.
