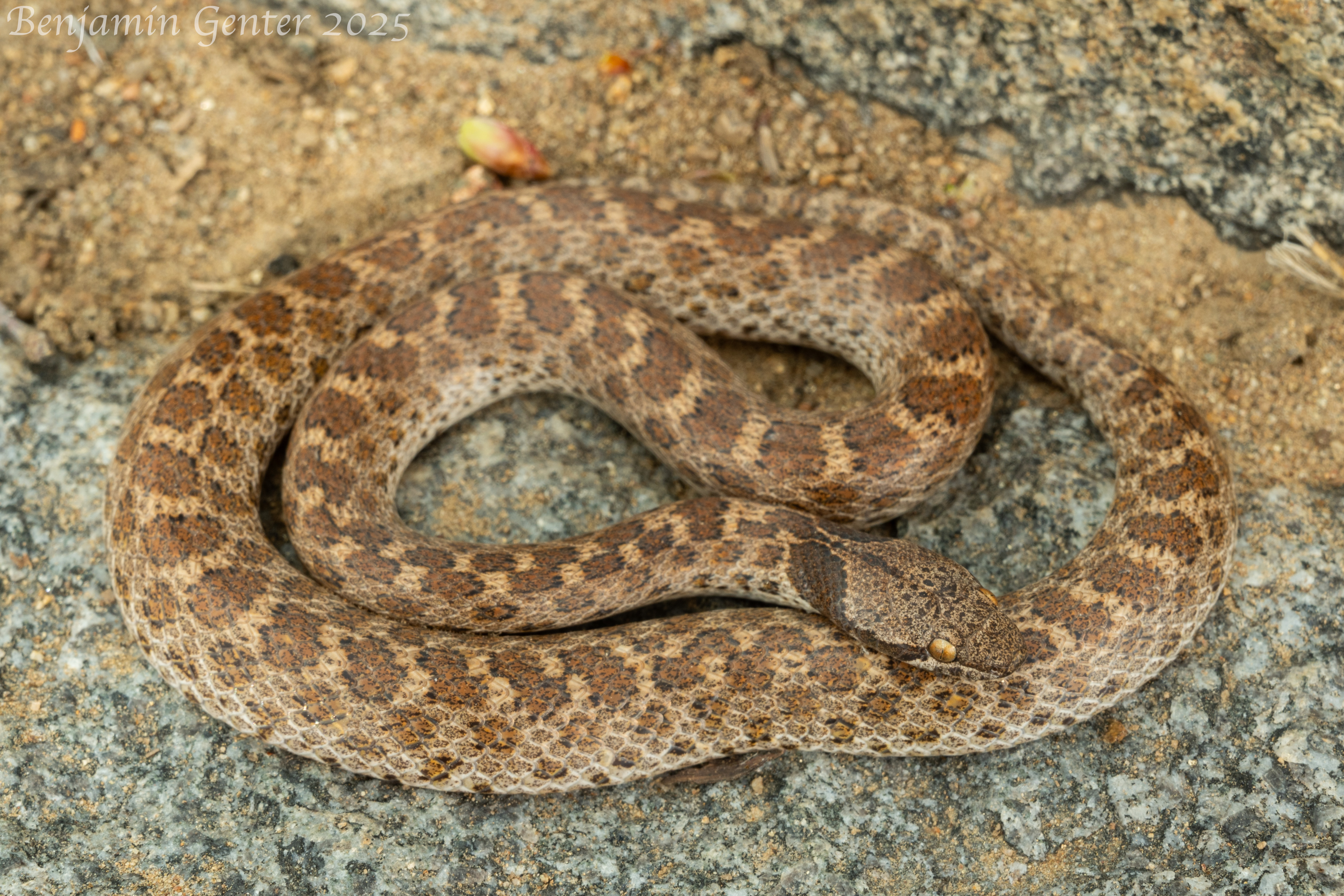

Conservation status
- Least Concern (IUCN 3.1)

Scientific classification
- Kingdom: Animalia
- Phylum: Chordata
- Class: Reptilia
- Order: Squamata
- Suborder: Serpentes
- Family: Colubridae
- Genus: Hypsiglena
- Species: H. ochrorhynchus

Binomial name
- Hypsiglena ochrorhynchus Cope, 1860

= Hypsiglena ochrorhynchus =

Species of snake

Hypsiglena ochrorhynchus, also known commonly as the coast night snake and the spotted night snake, is a species of snake in the subfamily Dipsadinae of the family Colubridae. The species is native to California in the United States and to the Baja California Peninsula in Mexico. There are eight recognized subspecies.

== Reproduction ==
H. ochrorhynchus is oviparous.

== Subspecies ==
Eight subspecies are recognized as being valid, including the nominotypical subspecies.

- Hypsiglena ochrorhynchus baueri Zweifel, 1958
- Hypsiglena ochrorhynchus gularis W. Tanner, 1954
- Hypsiglena ochrorhynchus klauberi W. Tanner, 1946
- Hypsiglena ochrorhynchus martinensis W. Tanner & Banta, 1962
- Hypsiglena ochrorhynchus nuchalata W. Tanner, 1943
- Hypsiglena ochrorhynchus ochrorhynchus Cope, 1860
- Hypsiglena ochrorhynchus tortugaensis W. Tanner, 1946
- Hypsiglena ochrorhynchus venusta Mocquard, 1899

== Etymologies ==
The subspecific name, baueri, is in honor of American entrepreneur Harry J. Bauer (1886–1960) for his support of the 1958 Puritan-American Museum expedition to Baja California.

The subspecific name, klauberi, is in honor of American herpetologist Laurence Monroe Klauber.
