= Monte L. Bean Life Science Museum =

Natural Science Museum in Provo, Utah

Coordinates: 40°15′12″N 111°38′51″W

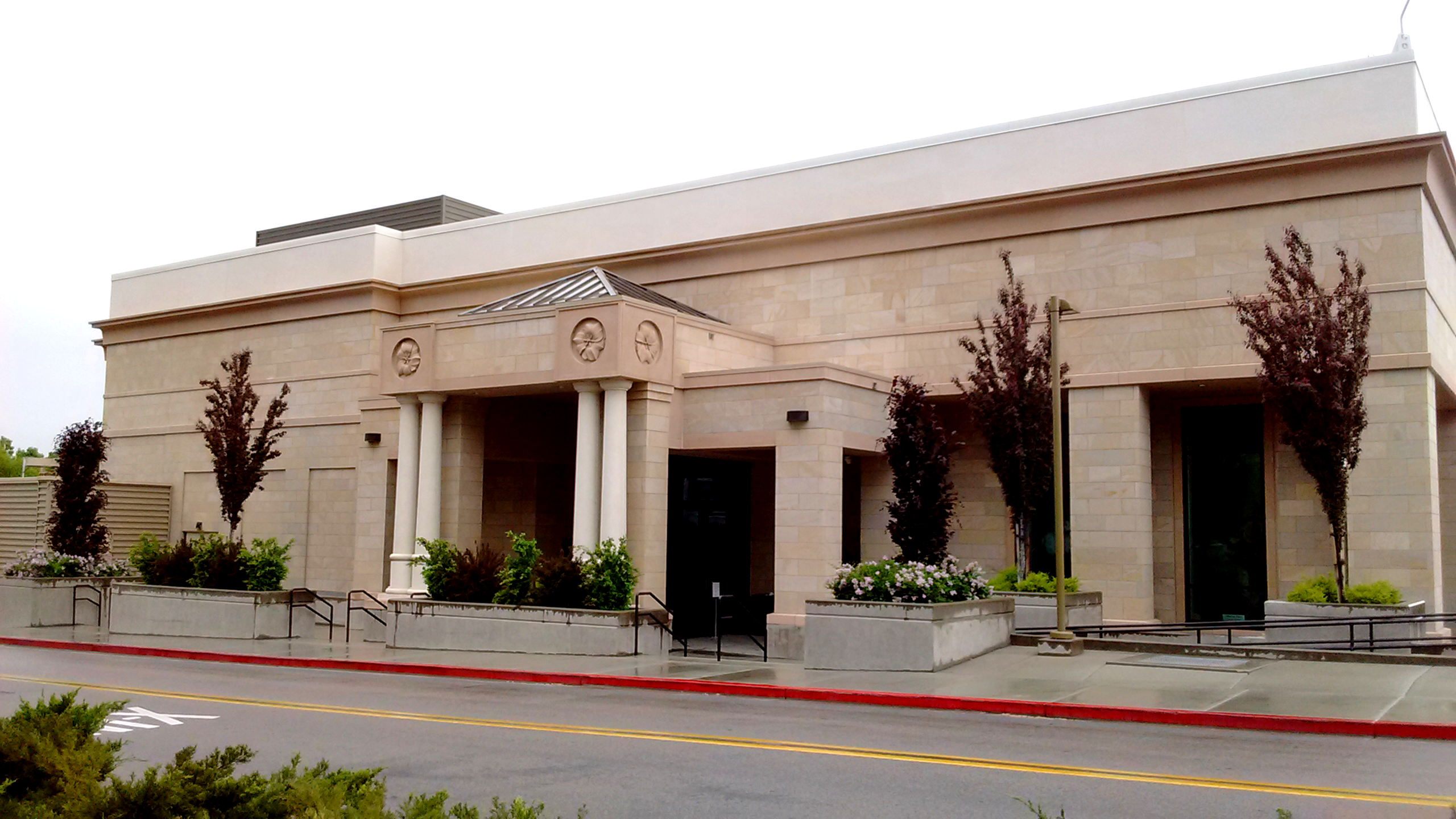
- Interactive map of the Monte L. Bean Life Science Museum area

General information
- Type: Educational
- Location: Provo, Utah

The Monte L. Bean Life Science Museum is a natural history museum housed at Brigham Young University (BYU) in Provo, Utah, United States.

== Description ==
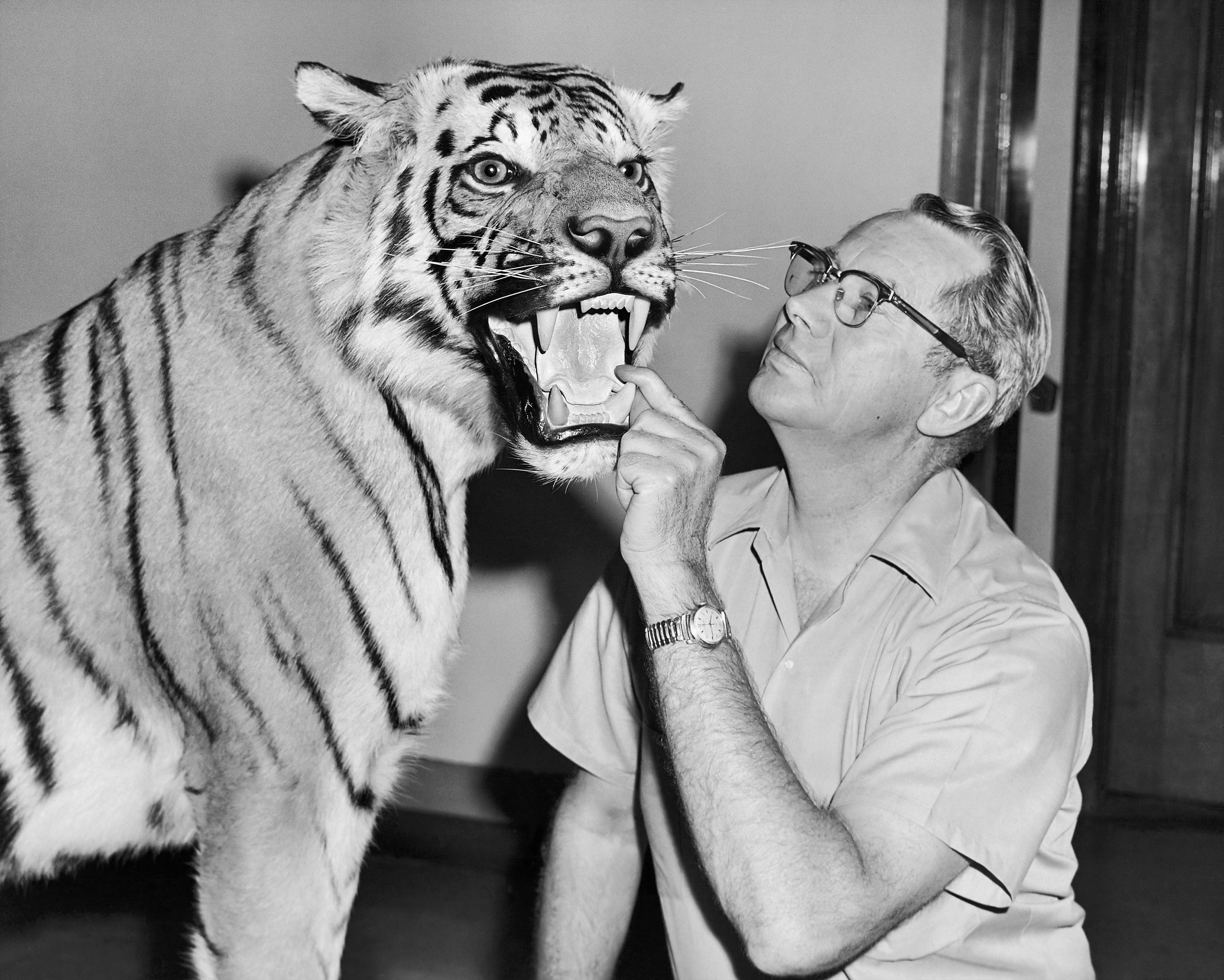
Wilmer W. Tanner with a donated tiger at the BYU Life Sciences Museum in 1973

The museum is named for Monte Lafayette Bean, a self-made Seattle-based magnate who entirely funded and paid for the building's construction. He also donated many of his own animal trophies to the collection. The Bean Museum opened on March 28, 1978, and is accredited by the American Alliance of Museums. It maintains collections of vascular and non-vascular plants, and invertebrate and vertebrate animals. Before 1978, it was known as the BYU Life Sciences Museum and did not have its own building. The Bean Museum now houses the Liger Shasta who lived at the Hogle Zoo from when she was born on May 6, 1948, till when she died, on July 12, 1972.

Admission to the three-story museum is free of charge and over 100,000 unique visitors come to see the over 2 million specimens of insects, plants, reptiles, fish, shells, and birds.
