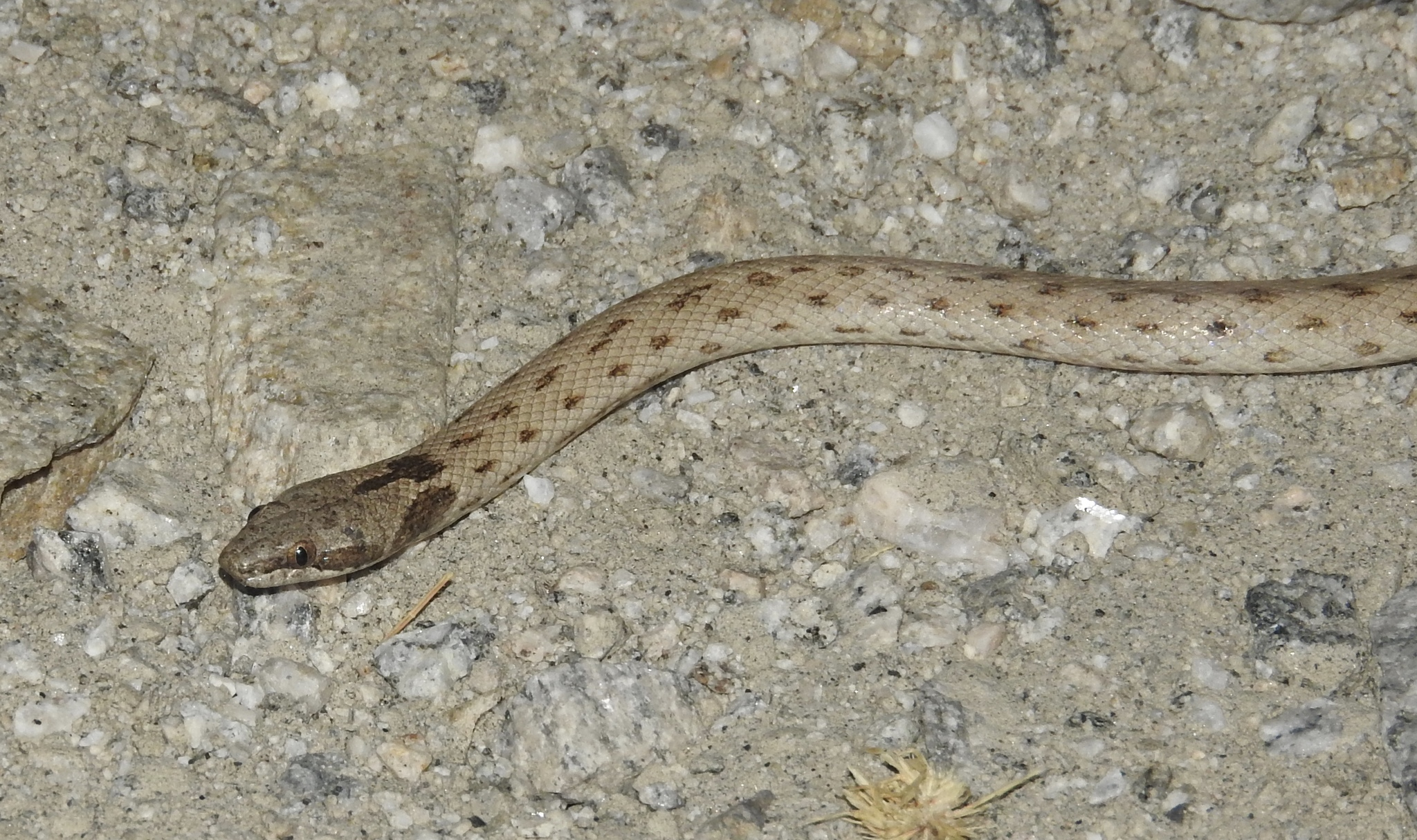

Conservation status
- Least Concern (IUCN 3.1)

Scientific classification
- Kingdom: Animalia
- Phylum: Chordata
- Class: Reptilia
- Order: Squamata
- Suborder: Serpentes
- Family: Colubridae
- Genus: Hypsiglena
- Species: H. chlorophaea

Binomial name
- Hypsiglena chlorophaea Cope, 1860
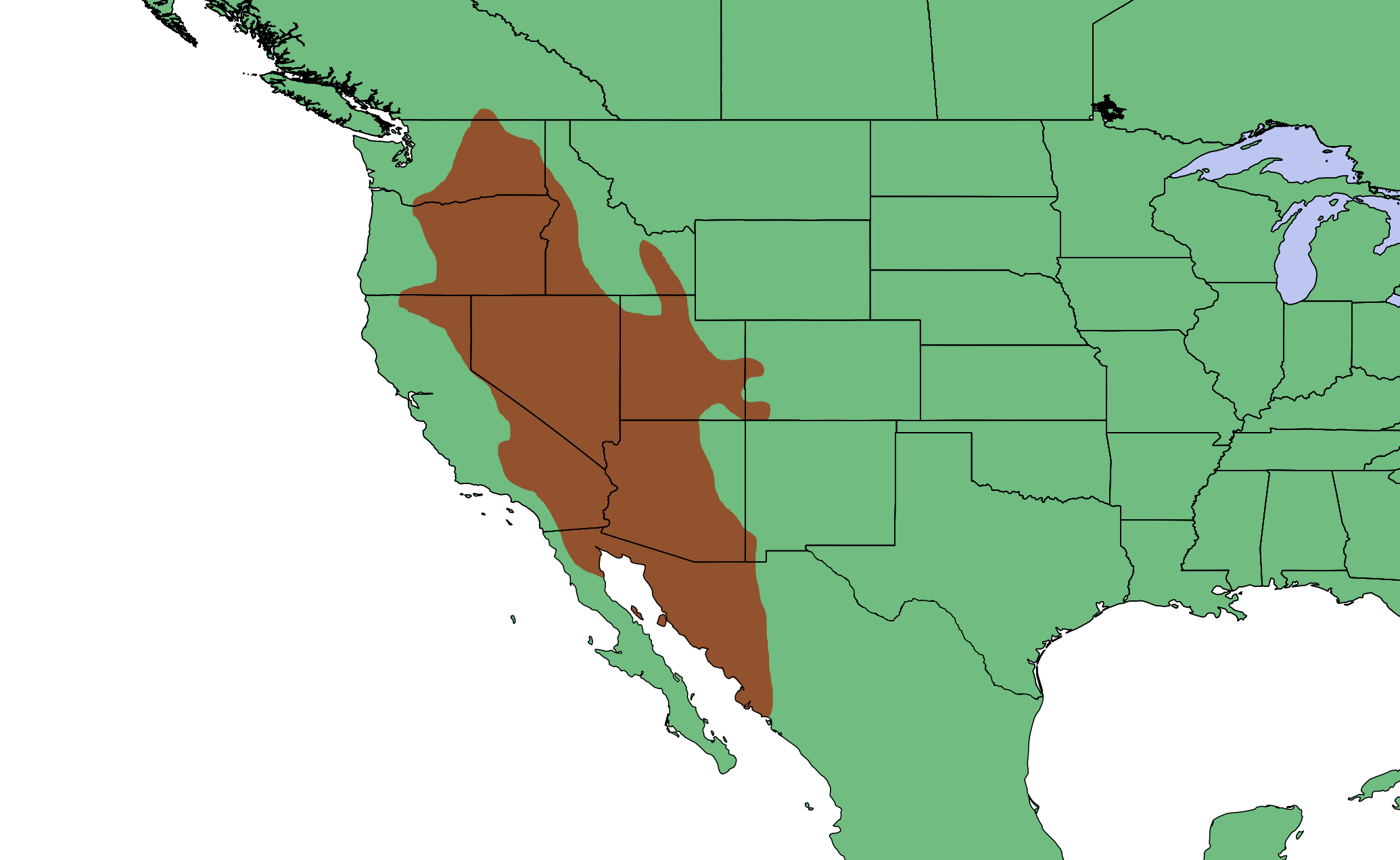

= Hypsiglena chlorophaea =

Species of snake

Hypsiglena chlorophaea, commonly known as the desert nightsnake, is a species of rear-fanged colubrid snake native to North America. It is found throughout regions of Mexico, the United States, and in a small, isolated population in British Columbia, Canada. Known for its highly secretive, nocturnal nature, it is a mildly venomous species that poses no danger to humans.

== Description ==
The desert nightsnake is a small, slender snake, typically measuring between 30 and 66 cm (12 to 26 inches) in total length. Females are generally longer and heavier than males. Its base coloration ranges from beige or yellowish to grey, overlaid with dark grey-brown blotches that usually form offset pairs down its back. It has three distinct, elongated dark blotches on its neck and behind each eye.

Because of its triangular-shaped head, vertical pupils, and blotched patterning, it is frequently mistaken for a juvenile rattlesnake. However, the desert nightsnake lacks a rattle and possesses smooth dorsal scales. It is an opisthoglyphous (rear-fanged) snake, meaning its enlarged, grooved teeth are located at the back of the upper jaw to help subdue prey.

== Subspecies ==
The desert nightsnake has three subspecies:

- H. c. chlorophaea - Sonoran Nightsnake, this subspecies is native to Arizona, Sonora, and north Sinaloa.
- H. c. deserticola - Northern Desert Nightsnake, this subspecies ranges from northern Baja California to California, Nevada, and Utah, to Oregon, Idaho, and Washington, and even southern British Columbia.
- H. c. Ioreala - Mesa Verde Nightsnake, this subspecies is mostly within the eastern half of Utah, but extends barely into northeast Arizona, northwest New Mexico, and western Colorado.

== Distribution and habitat ==
The species is widely distributed across the western and southwestern United States (including Arizona, California, Colorado, Idaho, Nevada, Oregon, Utah, and Washington), northwestern Mexico, and reaches its northernmost limits in the Okanagan and Similkameen valleys of south-central British Columbia, Canada.

Desert nightsnakes occupy a diverse range of arid and semi-arid environments. They are commonly found in desert scrub, chaparral, grasslands, oak woodlands, and rocky canyons. They heavily rely on surface cover, spending daylight hours hiding in rock crevices, talus slopes, beneath surface debris, or in abandoned mammal burrows.

== Behavior and diet ==
As its name suggests, the desert nightsnake is primarily nocturnal and crepuscular. It is an ambush predator that uses its mild venom to subdue prey. Its diet predominantly consists of small lizards (such as skinks) and lizard eggs. It will also opportunistically consume small snakes, frogs, salamanders, and insects.

== Reproduction ==
Hypsiglena chlorophaea is an oviparous (egg-laying) species. Mating generally occurs in the spring, and females lay a single clutch of 2 to 9 eggs (usually around 4) between April and July. The eggs are deposited in hidden, secure locations such as rock crevices or abandoned burrows. After an incubation period of 7 to 8 weeks, the eggs hatch in late summer. Hatchlings are typically around 17 cm (7 inches) long.

== Conservation status ==
Globally, the desert nightsnake is classified as a species of Least Concern by the IUCN due to its vast overall range and presumed large population size. However, regional populations face specific threats. In Canada, the species is federally listed as Endangered by the Committee on the Status of Endangered Wildlife in Canada (COSEWIC). The Canadian population is restricted to a very small area and is highly vulnerable to habitat loss and fragmentation caused by urban and agricultural development.
