= Wilmer W. Tanner =

American herpetologist (1909–2011)

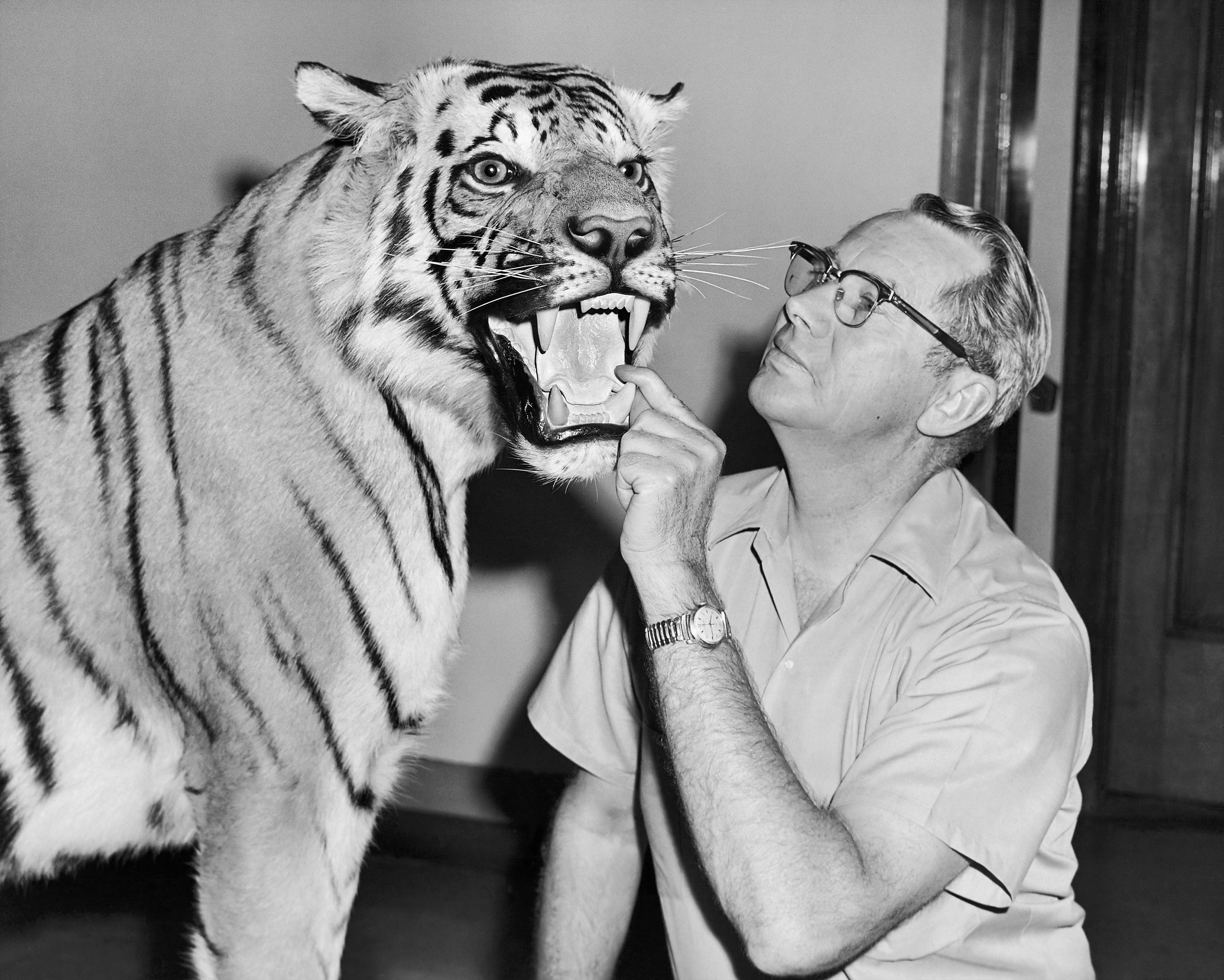
- Curator Tanner examines a donated tiger at the BYU Life Sciences Museum in 1973
- Born: December 17, 1909; Fairview, Utah
- Died: October 28, 2011 (aged 101)
- Education: Brigham Young University
- Spouse(s): Helen Brown (m. 1935–1995); Ottella Watson (m. 1999–2003)
- Parent(s): John and Lois Ann Tanner

Wilmer Webster Tanner (December 17, 1909 – October 28, 2011) was an American zoologist, professor and curator. He was associated with Brigham Young University (BYU), in Provo, Utah for much of his life and published extensively on the snakes and salamanders of the Great Basin.

== Family ==
Tanner was born in Fairview, Utah, into a Mormon family. His paternal grandfather, David Dan Tanner, had immigrated to Utah in 1848. Tanner was the fourth of John and Lois Ann Tanner's five children. One of Tanner's brothers, Vasco, was also a naturalist who taught at BYU.

On January 4, 1935, in the Salt Lake Temple Tanner married Helen Brown, with whom he had three children. Helen died in 1995, and Tanner married retired BYU instructor Ottella Watson on October 26, 1999. Ottella died November 21, 2003.

== Education and career ==
In 1929, Tanner was a Mormon missionary to the Netherlands, where he learned Dutch. After his return in 1932, Tanner attended BYU, graduating with a Bachelor of Arts in 1936. Tanner prepared a thesis about the snakes of Utah for his Master of Science in 1937. He then began a doctorate, but was delayed by World War II until 1946. At that time, Tanner was working as an assistant for Edward Harrison Taylor at the University of Kansas. Wilmer obtained his Ph.D. in 1948 with a thesis on comparative anatomy of salamanders of Mexico and Central America. In 1950, Tanner joined the BYU faculty.

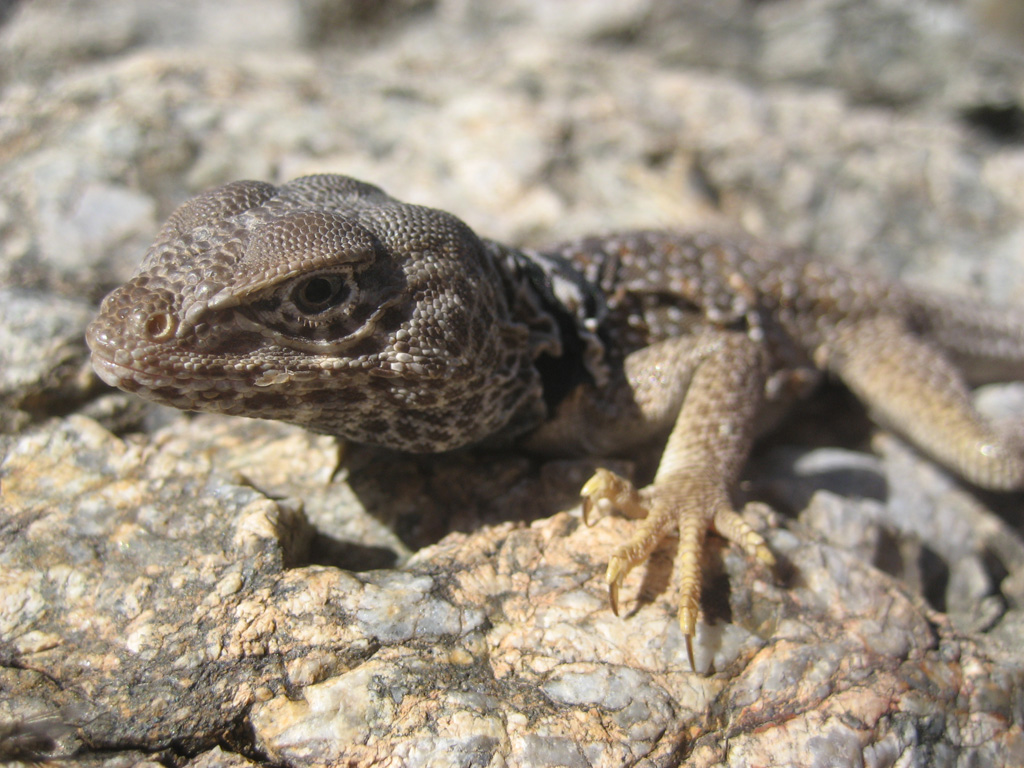
Tanner (together with Nathan M. Smith) described the desert collared lizard as a new species in 1972.

In 1961 it was reported that Tanner, then an associate professor of zoology and entomology at BYU, was in the midst of a four-year study of the effect on Utah wildlife from exposure to higher natural radiation (from petrified trees which can concentrate radioactive minerals), resulting in areas with a 10 to 20 microcurie higher radiation level per hour than is typical of the surrounding geography.

=== Museum leadership ===
Tanner served as the curator of the BYU's Life Sciences Museum from 1972 to 1979. In the late 70s, he helped process a large donation of samples and convinced the donor to fund a new building for the museum. The Monte L. Bean Life Science Museum opened to the public in 1978 and over the ensuing years increased staff were hired, educational exhibits developed and scientific activities funded. Tanner felt this was the most important aspect of his career and devoted almost a quarter of his autobiography to discussing how the grant was won from Mr. Bean.

== Study and work ==
Tanner's interest in herpetology was influenced by many people, primarily his brother Vasco Myron Tanner (a professor of zoology and entomology of Brigham Young University), Joseph Richard Slevin of the California Academy of Sciences, and Laurence Monroe Klauber (who gave Tanner access to his collection); Helen Beulah Thompson Gaige, Norman Edouard Hartweg, Clark Hubbs, and Albert Hazen Wright were also influential.

Tanner published over 130 scientific articles, fifteen describing new species and genera. He is commemorated in the scientific name of the lizard Sceloporus tanneri.

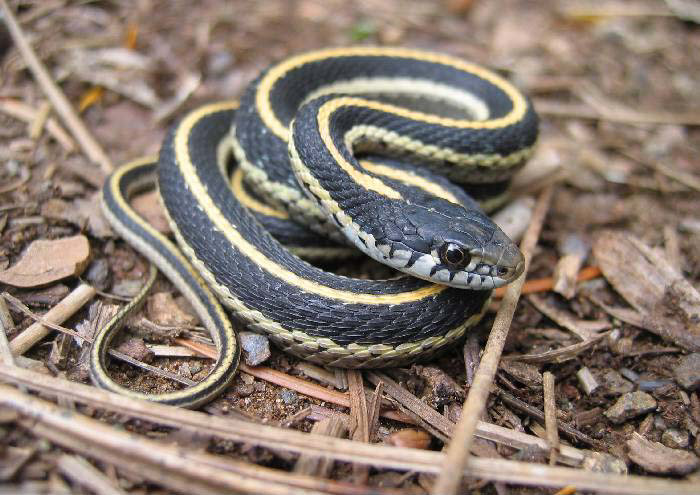
A western terrestrial garter snake, of which Tanner identified 2 possible subspecies.

Tanner was a member of the American Society of Ichthyologists and Herpetologists and the American Association for the Advancement of Science, and was one-time president of the Herpetologists' League. He was the publisher of Herpetologica magazine for 18 years. He has also served as president of the Provo Energy Board.
