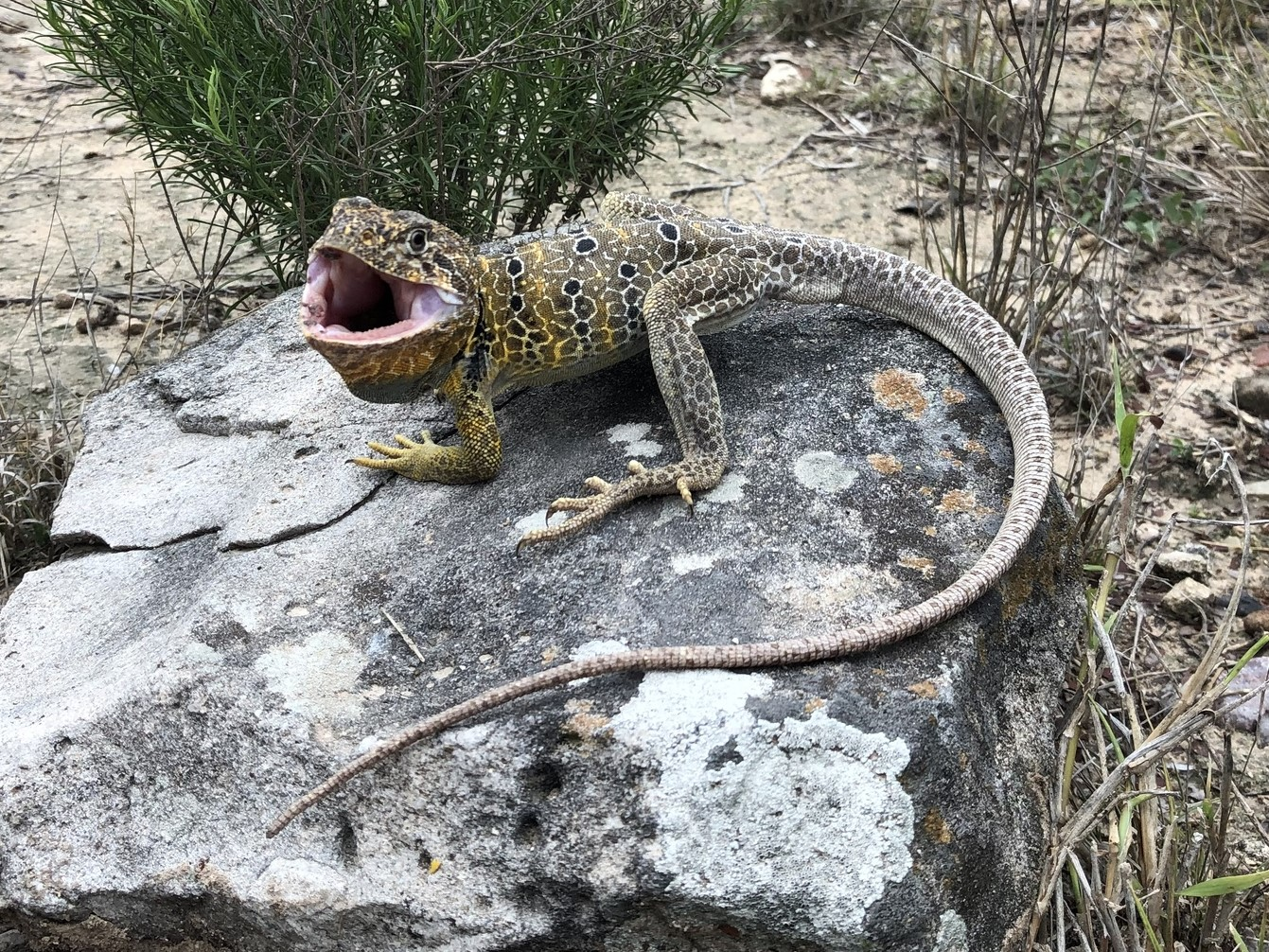

Conservation status
- Vulnerable (IUCN 3.1)

Scientific classification
- Kingdom: Animalia
- Phylum: Chordata
- Class: Reptilia
- Order: Squamata
- Suborder: Iguania
- Family: Crotaphytidae
- Genus: Crotaphytus
- Species: C. reticulatus

Binomial name
- Crotaphytus reticulatus Baird, 1858

= Crotaphytus reticulatus =

Species of lizard

Crotaphytus reticulatus, commonly called the reticulate collared lizard, is a species of moderately sized lizard in the family Crotaphytidae. The species is native to semiarid, rocky regions of the Tamaulipan mezquital. Its range includes the US state of Texas and the Mexican states of Coahuila, Nuevo León, and Tamaulipas. Of all the species in the family Crotaphytidae, C. reticulatus is the only species which is not restricted to rocky habitats.

== Description ==
Crotaphytus reticulatus is a tan to brown lizard with reticulations covering most of its dorsum, limbs, and tail. Some of these reticulations are filled with black pigmentation. Unlike the rest of the species in the genus Crotaphytus, there is no color difference between males and females of C. reticulatus except during the breeding season. During this time, males develop a bright yellow coloration on their chests. The collars on C. reticulatus are faint and the anterior collar is complete ventrally. The dewlap, or gular area, is a greenish-gray with black pigmentation in the center. During the breeding season, the gular area of the female is white to yellow, without the black pigmentation in the center. Symmetrical black spots fill in some of the pattern. The ventral surface is white or a cream color. C. reticulatus grows to a total length (including tail) of 41 cm (16 in). Males have a black collar around the neck, and yellow chest and throat markings. Females develop orange bars along the underside when about to lay eggs. Collared lizards have small pockets at the base of the tail and folds of skin above the front legs. Mites and chiggers gather in these areas. C. reticulatus lacks the postfemoral mite pockets present in the rest of the genus. This suggests this genus broke away from the ancestral group first. C. reticulatus has black oral melanin and black femoral pore secretions. The rest of the genus, except C. antiquus, has gray secretions.

== Behavior ==
The reticulate collared lizard is diurnal and primarily carnivorous, feeding on invertebrates and other small prey, even other lizards. It spends most of its time perched on rocks, basking in the sun, but is generally quick to flee if approached. C. reticulatus spends its life on the ground much like the closely related leopard lizards. When threatened, it will take refuge in rodent burrows and under brush.

== Conservation concerns ==
The geographic range of the species C. reticulatus is declining due to habitat destruction and possibly climate change. The reticulated collared lizard is the only crotaphytid species in the United States that is protected from collection.
