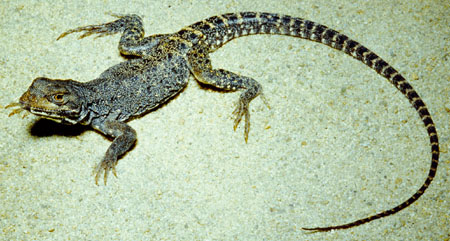

Conservation status
- Least Concern (IUCN 3.1)

Scientific classification
- Kingdom: Animalia
- Phylum: Chordata
- Class: Reptilia
- Order: Squamata
- Suborder: Iguania
- Family: Crotaphytidae
- Genus: Gambelia
- Species: G. copeii

Binomial name
- Gambelia copeii (Yarrow, 1882)

Synonyms
- Crotaphytus copeii Yarrow, 1882; Gambelia wislizeni copei — Banta & W. Tanner, 1968; Gambelia copeii — McGuire, 1996

= Baja California leopard lizard =

Species of lizard

The Baja California leopard lizard (Gambelia copeii), also known commonly as Cope's leopard lizard, is a species of lizard in the family Crotaphytidae. The species is endemic to Baja California and adjacent southern California.

== Etymology ==
The specific name, copeii, is in honor of American herpetologist and paleontologist Edward Drinker Cope.

== Description ==
Gambelia copeii is between 8 and 14 cm (3.1 and 5.5 in) in snout-to-vent length (SVL), and has a smoky gray color and darker gray or black dorsal spots, edged in a lighter shade. The dorsal pattern appears mottled or ocellated. There are light crossbars on the dorsum, and light gray or white on the venter. It has small granular scales. The large head is distinct from the neck, and the lining of the mouth and throat is purplish-black. Juvenile lizards are similar to adults, but have more distinct banding across the dorsum. Females develop red-orange blotches on the ventral side during breeding season. Males have femoral pores.

== Biology ==
The Baja California leopard lizard is an uncommon species. It is a powerful bipedal runner. An adult can inflict a painful bite. It prefers chaparral habitats with an open understory.

== Sources ==
- This article is based on a description from the website of Robert N. Fisher and Ted J. Case, "A Field Guide to the Reptiles and Amphibians of Coastal Southern California", US Geological Survey. https://www.werc.usgs.gov/fieldguide/index.htm.
