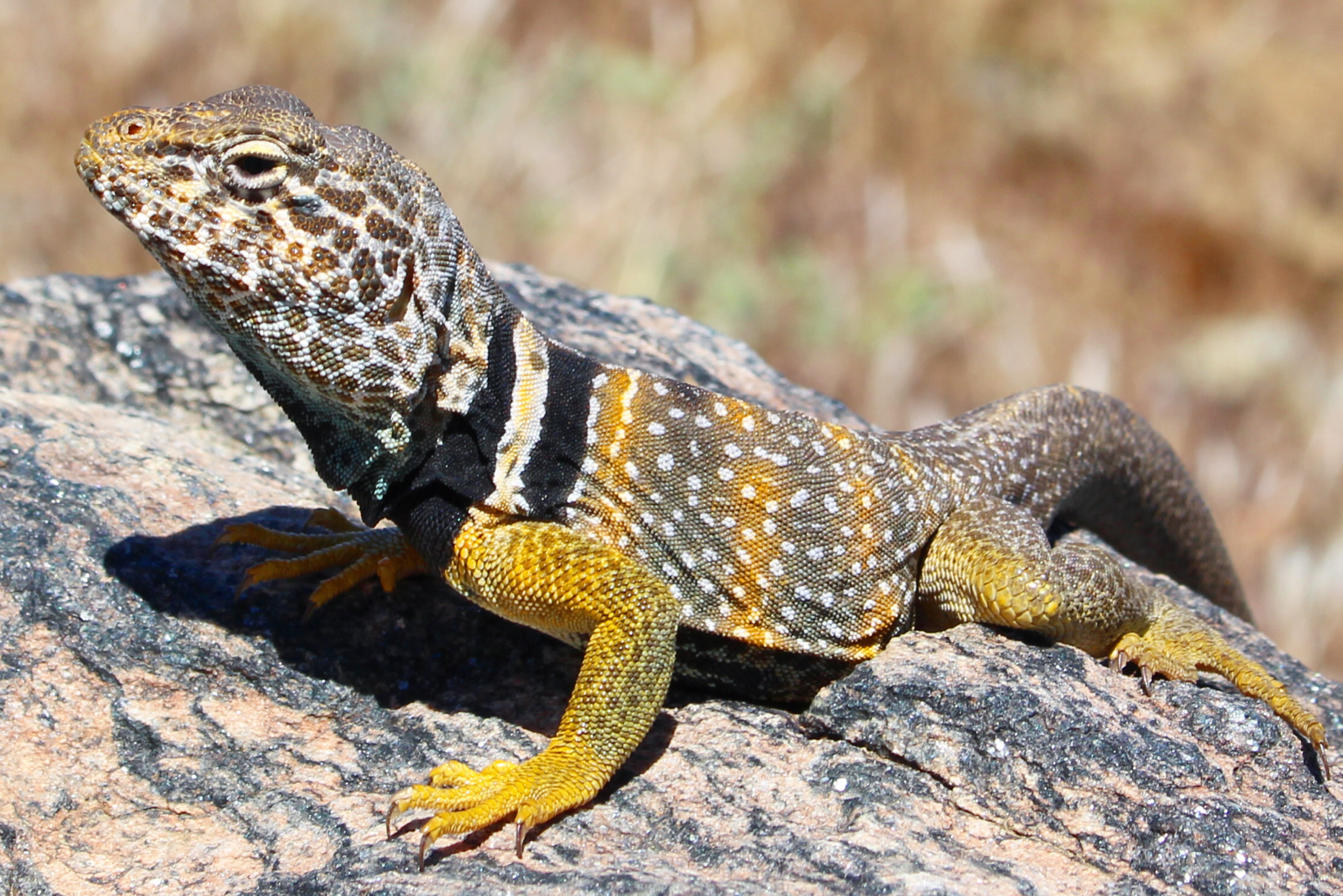

Conservation status
- Least Concern (IUCN 3.1)

Scientific classification
- Kingdom: Animalia
- Phylum: Chordata
- Class: Reptilia
- Order: Squamata
- Suborder: Iguania
- Family: Crotaphytidae
- Genus: Crotaphytus
- Species: C. bicinctores

Binomial name
- Crotaphytus bicinctores N. Smith & W. Tanner, 1972
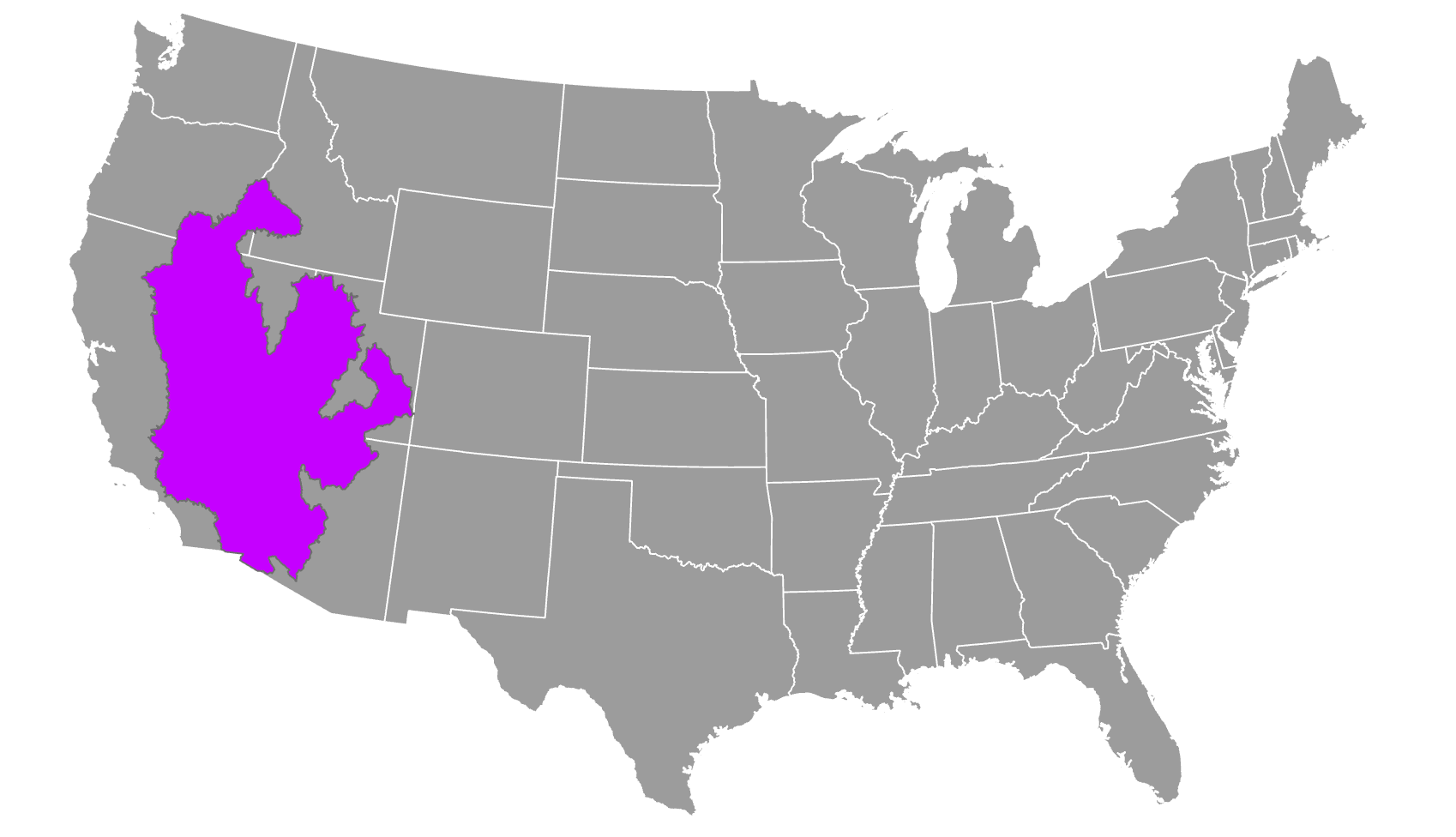
- Great Basin collared lizard range

Synonyms
- Crotaphytus collaris bicinctores N. Smith & W. Tanner, 1972; Crotaphytus insularis bicinctores — Axtell, 1972; Crotaphytus bicinctores — Sanborn & Loomis, 1979

= Great Basin collared lizard =

Species of lizard

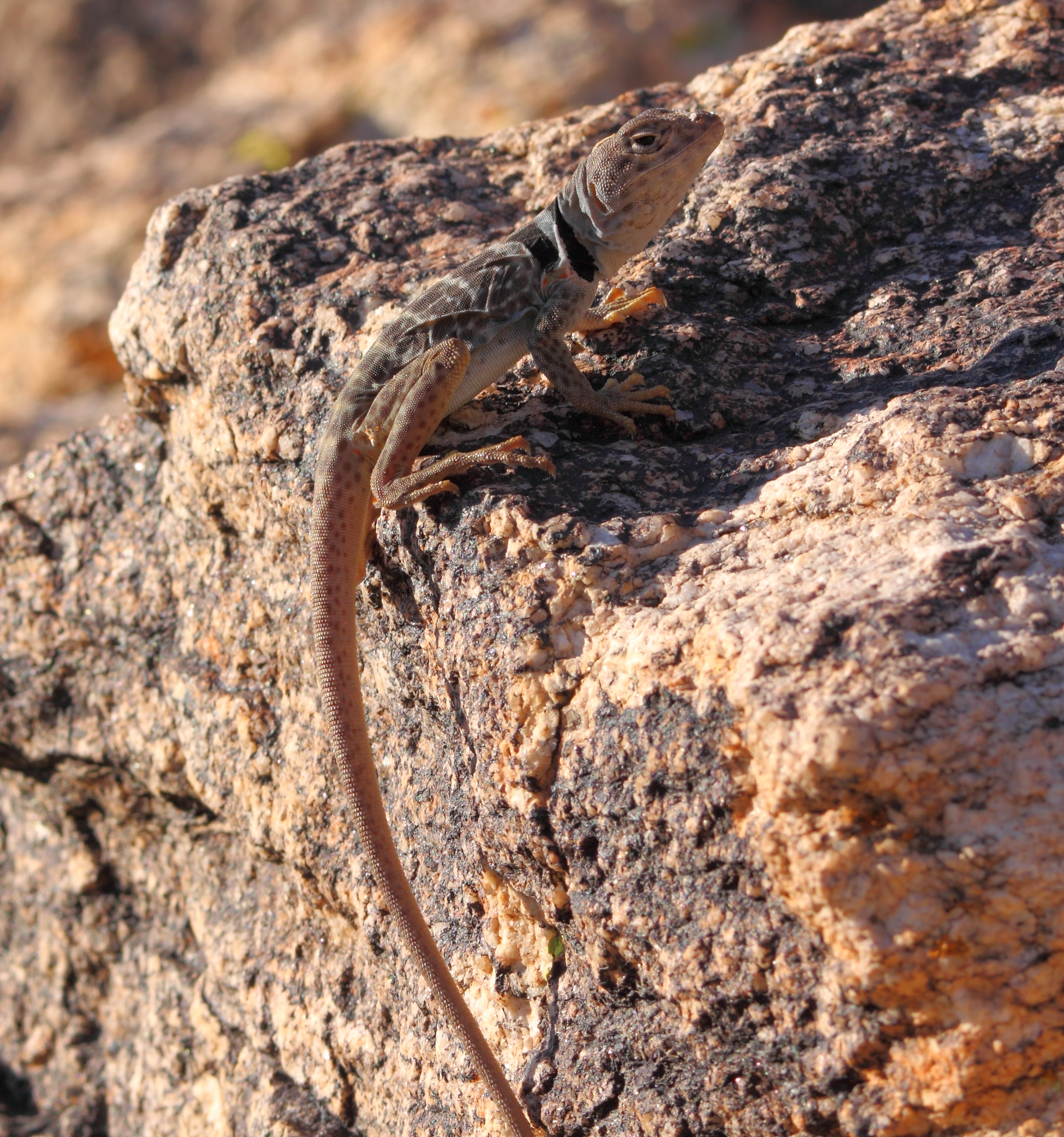
Desert collared lizard

The Great Basin collared lizard (Crotaphytus bicinctores), also known commonly as the desert collared lizard or the Mojave black-collared lizard, is a species of lizard in the family Crotaphytidae. The species is endemic to the Western United States.

== Description ==
C. bicinctores is very similar to the common collared lizard, Crotaphytus collaris, in shape and size, but it lacks the bright extravagant colors. Males can be brown to orange and some red or pink on the belly. Females are more black or dark brown. C. bicintores has elongated scales near the claws, and the tail is more triangular in shape than round as with C. collaris.

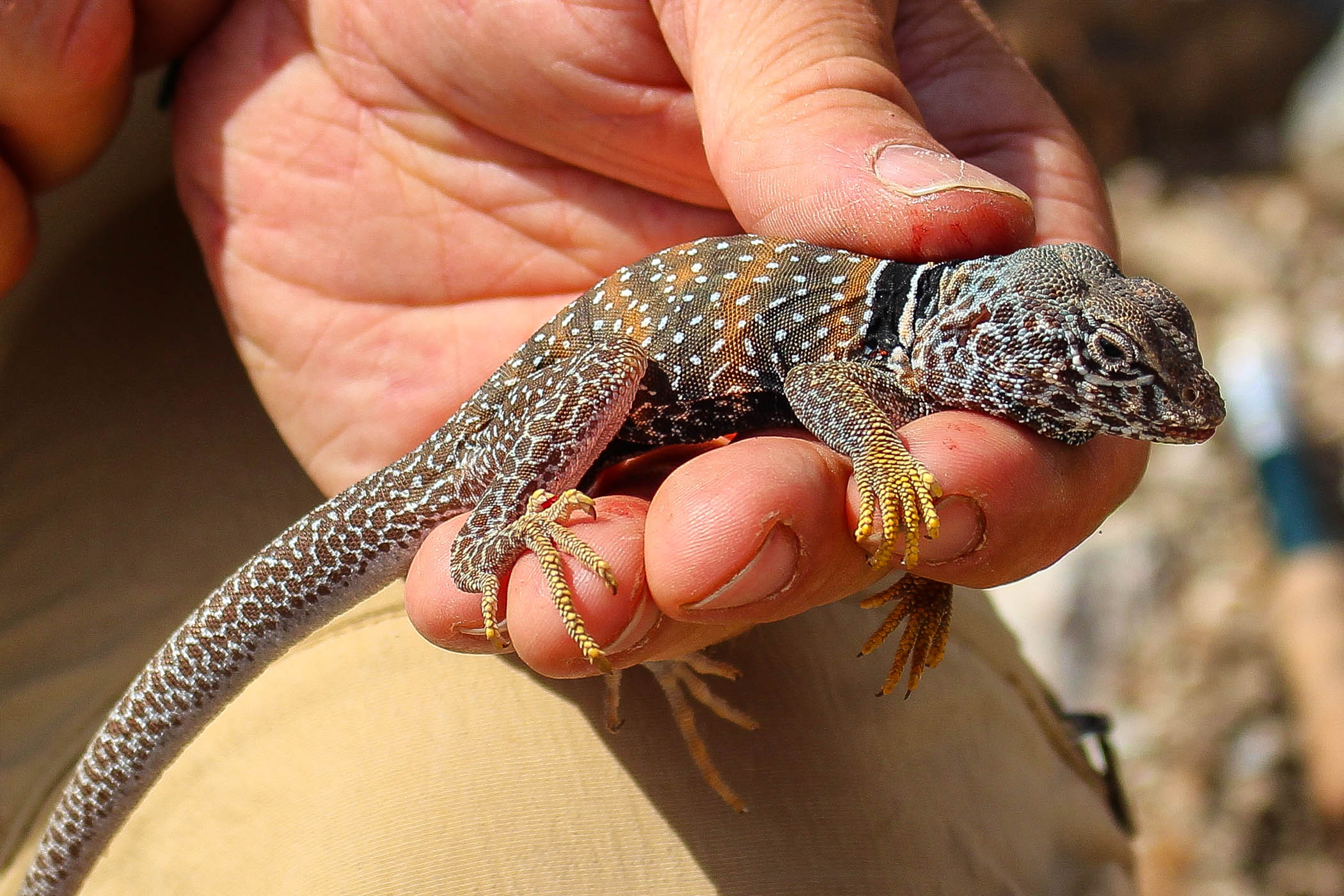
Held by human hand

C. bicinctores has a broad head, large hind legs, and derives its specific name from the pair of black bands on the neck. Males have broader heads than females, with a dark-colored throat and more pronounced orange crossbands on the body. Adults range in size from 2.5 to 4.5 in (6.4 to 11.4 cm) in snout-to-vent length (SVL), with a thick tail that is often twice as long as the body.

== Geographic range and habitat ==
The Great Basin collared lizard is endemic to the Western United States, and is found in California, most of Nevada, southeastern Oregon, southern Idaho, and the western regions of Utah and Arizona. It is usually found in rocky regions of arid deserts, and is most common in desert scrub and desert wash habitats. It is widely distributed throughout the Mojave, Sonoran, and southeastern Great Basin deserts.

== Diet ==
C. bicinctores eats primarily arthropods, but will also use its powerful jaws to eat small vertebrates including lizards, snakes, and rodents. It has been known to occasionally consume plant matter.
