= Collared lizard =

Collared lizard may refer to:

- Any member of the North America genus Crotaphytus
- Crotaphytidae, the family of collared lizards of which Crotaphytus is a member
- Oplurus cuvieri, a species native to Madagascar
