= Eastern collared lizard =

There are two species of lizard named eastern collared lizard:

- Common collared lizard, native to Mexico and the United States
- Crotaphytus insularis, native to Mexico
