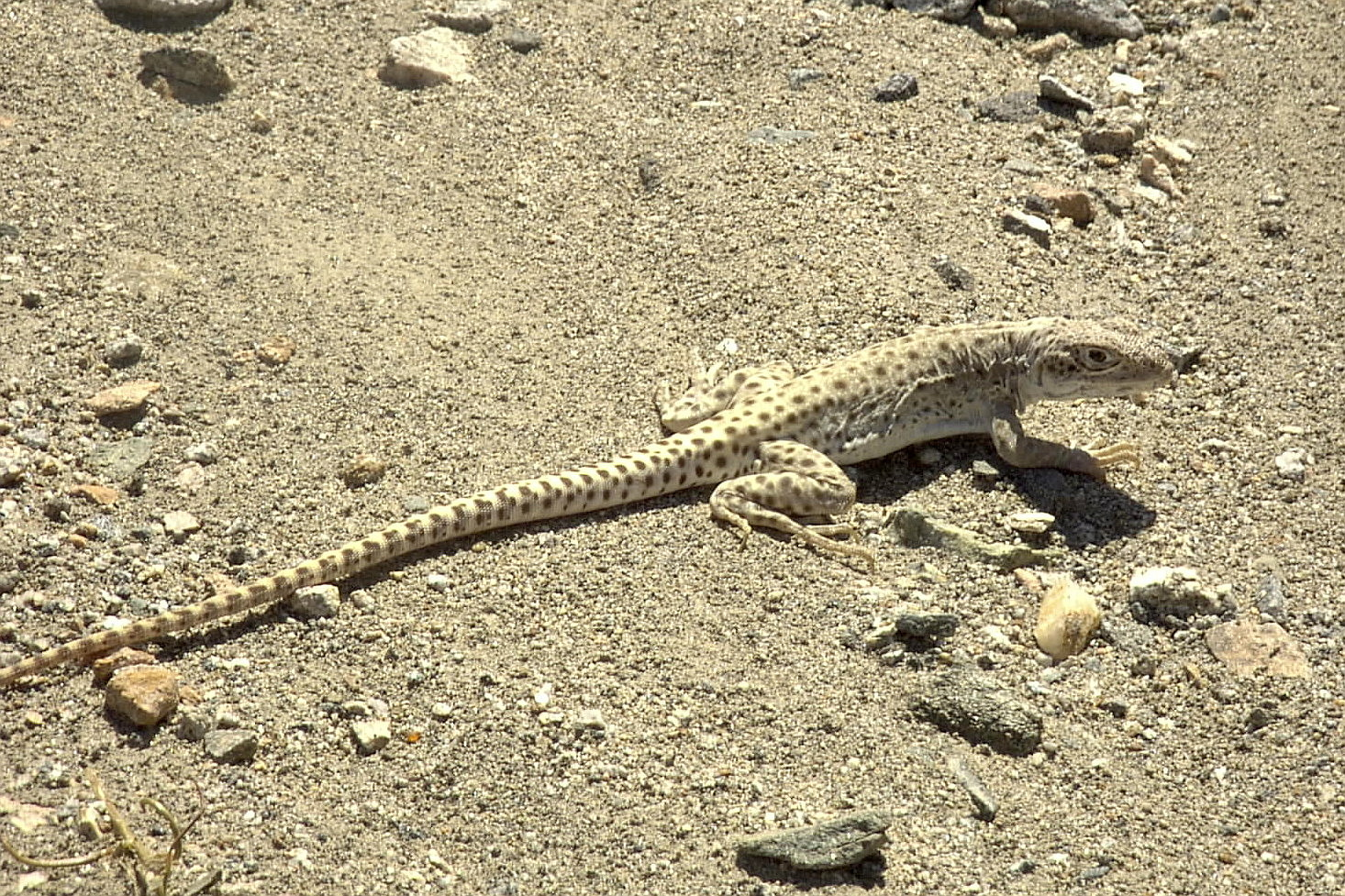
- Taken at Mojave Desert

Conservation status
- Least Concern (IUCN 3.1)

Scientific classification
- Kingdom: Animalia
- Phylum: Chordata
- Class: Reptilia
- Order: Squamata
- Suborder: Iguania
- Family: Crotaphytidae
- Genus: Gambelia
- Species: G. wislizenii

Binomial name
- Gambelia wislizenii Baird & Girard, 1852

Synonyms
- Crotaphytus wislizenii Baird & Girard, 1852; Crotaphytus gambelii Baird & Girard, 1852; Crotaphytus fasciatus Hallowell, 1852; Leiosaurus hallowelli A.H.A. Duméril, 1856; Crotaphytus (Gambelia) wislizenii — Baird, 1859; Crotaphytus fasciatus Mocquard, 1899 (non Hallowell); Crotaphytus fasciolatus Mocquard, 1903; Gambelia wislizenii — H.M. Smith, 1946

= Long-nosed leopard lizard =

Species of lizard

The long-nosed leopard lizard (Gambelia wislizenii) is a species of relatively large North American lizard in the family Crotaphytidae. Gambelia wislizenii ranges in snout-to-vent length (SVL) from 8.3 to 14.6 cm (3 1/4 to 5 3/4 in). It has a large head, a long nose, and a long round tail that can be longer than its body. It is closely related to the blunt-nosed leopard lizard (Gambelia sila), which closely resembles the long-nosed leopard lizard in body proportions, but has a conspicuously blunt snout. The species G. wislizenii, once considered part of the genus Crotaphytus, is under moderate pressure because of habitat destruction but is categorized as "least concern".

== Etymology ==
The specific name or epithet, wislizenii, is in honor of the German-American surgeon and naturalist Frederick Adolph Wislizenus, who caught the first specimen near Santa Fe, New Mexico.

== Description ==
Gambelia wislizenii has granular dorsal scales that can be white, cream, or gray with irregular brown or dark gray spots along its body and head. Sometimes they have dark bars across their back. The tail also has dark bars across it. Juveniles have more highly contrasted markings compared to adults, often with rusty coloring on the back or bright red spots, and yellow on the thighs and under the tail.

The male and female are different in appearance. The female is about 15 cm (5.8 in) snout-vent length, and the male is smaller, measuring about 12 cm (4.8 in) SVL. Both sexes are capable of marked color changes. In its dark phase the lizard's spots are nearly hidden and light crossbars become quite obvious on both the body and the tail. In the light phase the opposite is true with the dominant color consisting of gray, pinkish, brown or yellowish brown hues. During the mating season females develop reddish orange spots and bars on their sides and underneath the tail when gravid. Males develop pink or rusty wash on the throat, chest, and sometimes the body, during the breeding season.

== Distribution and habitat ==
The long-nosed leopard lizard prefers to inhabit arid and semiarid plains growth, like bunch grass, alkali bush, sagebrush, creosote bush, and other scattered low plants. The ground can be hardpan, sand, or even gravel with rocks that may often be used as basking sites. G. wislizenii prefers flat areas with open space for running, avoiding densely vegetated areas. It is found from near sea level to around 6,000 feet (1,800 m). Its range includes the western part of the United States from Oregon to Idaho in the north, south to northern Mexico in Baja California, Sonora, Coahuila, and Zacatecas and Casa Grande, Arizona. In San Diego County, it occurs east of the Peninsula Ranges within the Lower Colorado Desert. It is found in desert flats and lower foothills with little vegetation.

== Behaviors ==
The long-nosed leopard lizard is often seen on small rocks along the roadside, preferring direct sunlight when basking. It is diurnal and has the potential to be active all day when the weather is mild to warm. The daily activity cycle starts relatively early (05:30–08:30, variation depends on location), and after a period of basking, long-nosed leopard lizards begin active hunting and feeding. When in danger, it uses a defense mechanism known as "freeze" behavior, which means it runs underneath a bush, flattens its body against the ground and is motionless until the threat is gone. If the case is extreme enough, such as capture, it is capable of caudal autotomy, or tail separation. Its speed and agility are major contributors to its predatory success as well as its ability to evade predators. When running at rapid speeds it runs with forelimbs raised.

== Feeding habits ==
The long-nosed leopard lizard preys on small lizards such as Aspidoscelis Costatus, in addition to insects and sometimes rodents, like all members of the family. This lizard also is cannibalistic, eating smaller leopard lizards when the opportunity arises. On occasion, it will eat the young leopard lizards as they hatch, but the adults are usually not active during the time period when most young hatch from their eggs. This allows the young time to grow and become more of a contender with the larger adults. Its long nose usually makes its jaw quicker and better for catching vertebrate prey. This species utilizes stalking and ambush techniques when hunting. As an ambush predator, it lies in wait in the shadows underneath a bush or small tree, where its spotted pattern blends, waiting for its prey to come within capture range. When prey is sufficiently close, it uses a rapid pouncing movement to capture the prey in its strong jaws. The long-nosed leopard lizard has been documented to jump up to two feet (60 cm) in any direction, including into the air, in order to catch prey.

"More than one leopard lizard has been found choked to death by the size of the prey it attempted to swallow."

Some predators of long-nosed leopard lizards include a number of birds, snakes, coyotes, badgers, and the kit fox.

== Reproduction ==
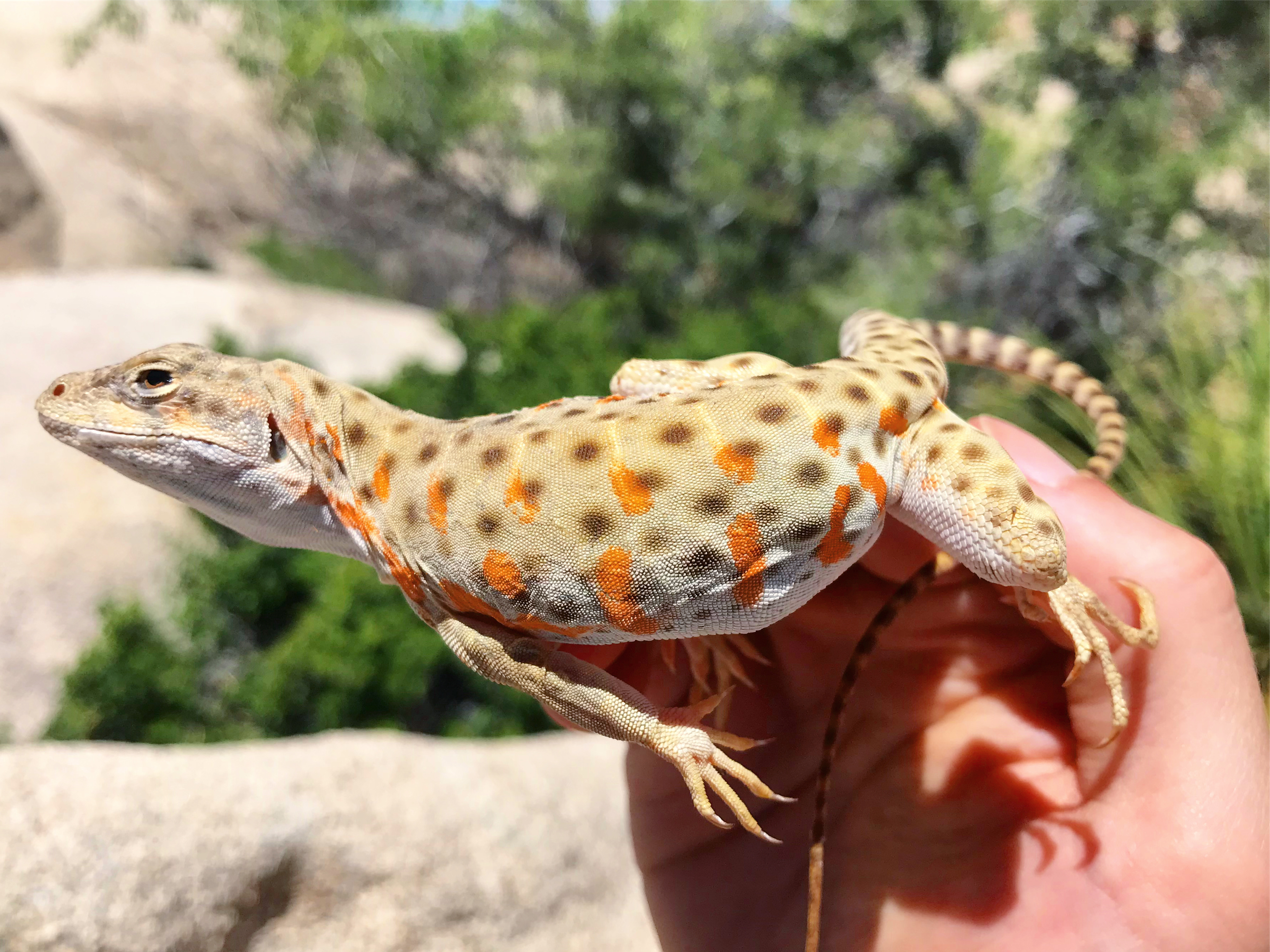
Gravid female

The breeding season of G. wislizenii extends from May to June with a single clutch of 5–6 eggs being laid usually in June or July, which hatch in the late summer months of July or August. During mating no pair bond is formed between adults. A single clutch is usually laid per year but in the warmer climates towards the south, it is possible for a female to lay up to two clutches per year. Birthing and egg-laying occur in a burrow, although no nest structure is formed. Egg incubation is estimated to be between five and seven weeks. Young emerge in August, when adult activity is coming to an end. The timing of the juvenile emergence coinciding with the cessation of adult activity may aid in the prevention of cannibalism.

== Conservation status ==
The blunt-nosed leopard lizard (Gambelia sila) is endangered. It is no longer present throughout most of its former range as the habitat has been significantly altered by farming, urban development, overgrazing, oil wells, mining, reservoirs, and off-road vehicle use. This habitat alteration continues. However, there are no specific conservation concerns for the long-nosed leopard lizard (Gambelia wislizenii ).
