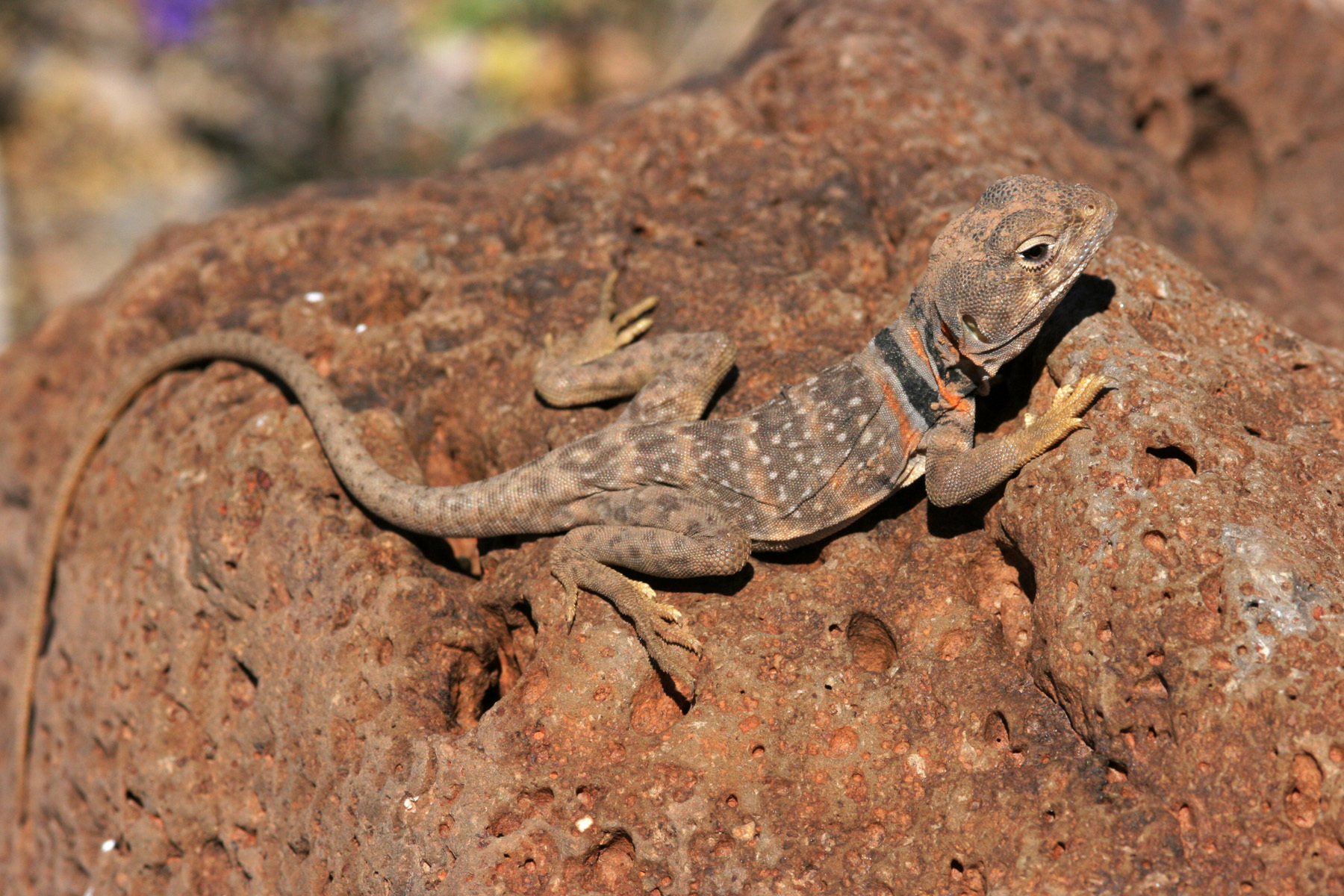

Scientific classification
- Kingdom: Animalia
- Phylum: Chordata
- Class: Reptilia
- Order: Squamata
- Suborder: Iguania
- Family: Crotaphytidae
- Genus: Crotaphytus
- Species: C. nebrius

Binomial name
- Crotaphytus nebrius Axtell & Montanucci, 1977

Synonyms
- Crotaphytus collaris nebrius Axtell & Montanucci, 1977; Crotaphytus nebrius — McGuire, 1996

= Crotaphytus nebrius =

Species of lizard

The Sonoran collared lizard (Crotaphytus nebrius) is a species of lizard in the family Crotaphytidae. The species is endemic to the U.S. state of Arizona and the Mexican state of Sonora.

== Description ==
C. nebrius is a grayish-yellow with grayish-white spots, which are large down the middle of the body, and small on the sides.They are also known for having a set of black stripes on their neck, and may also have red-orange markings on their neck.

== Behavior ==
Adults of C. nebrius are primarily active during spring and summer; the juveniles can be active until November.

== Reproduction ==
C. nebrius is oviparous.

== Predation ==
A wide variety of animals prey upon this species, including roadrunners, coyotes, bobcats, domestic cats, foxes and raptors.
