= Grismer's collared lizard =

Conservation status
- Least Concern (IUCN 3.1)

Scientific classification
- Kingdom: Animalia
- Phylum: Chordata
- Class: Reptilia
- Order: Squamata
- Suborder: Iguania
- Family: Crotaphytidae
- Genus: Crotaphytus
- Species: C. grismeri

Binomial name
- Crotaphytus grismeri McGuire, 1994

Species of lizard

Grismer's collared lizard (Crotaphytus grismeri), also known commonly as the Sierra los Cucapas collared lizard and el cachorón de Sierra de los Cucapas in Mexican Spanish, is a species of lizard in the family Iguanidae. The species is endemic to Baja California, Mexico.

== Etymology ==
The specific name, grismeri, is in honor of American herpetologist Larry Lee Grismer.

== Geographic range ==
In Baja California, C. grismeri is found in the Sierra de Los Cucapah and the contiguous Sierra El Mayor.

== Habitat ==
The preferred natural habitat of C. grismeri is rocky areas of desert.

== Description ==
C. grismeri is smaller as an adult than all other species of Crotaphytus. The light portion of the collar is green, and the tail is dull orange.

== Behavior ==
C. grismeri is terrestrial and saxicolous.

== Reproduction ==
C. grismeri is oviparous.
