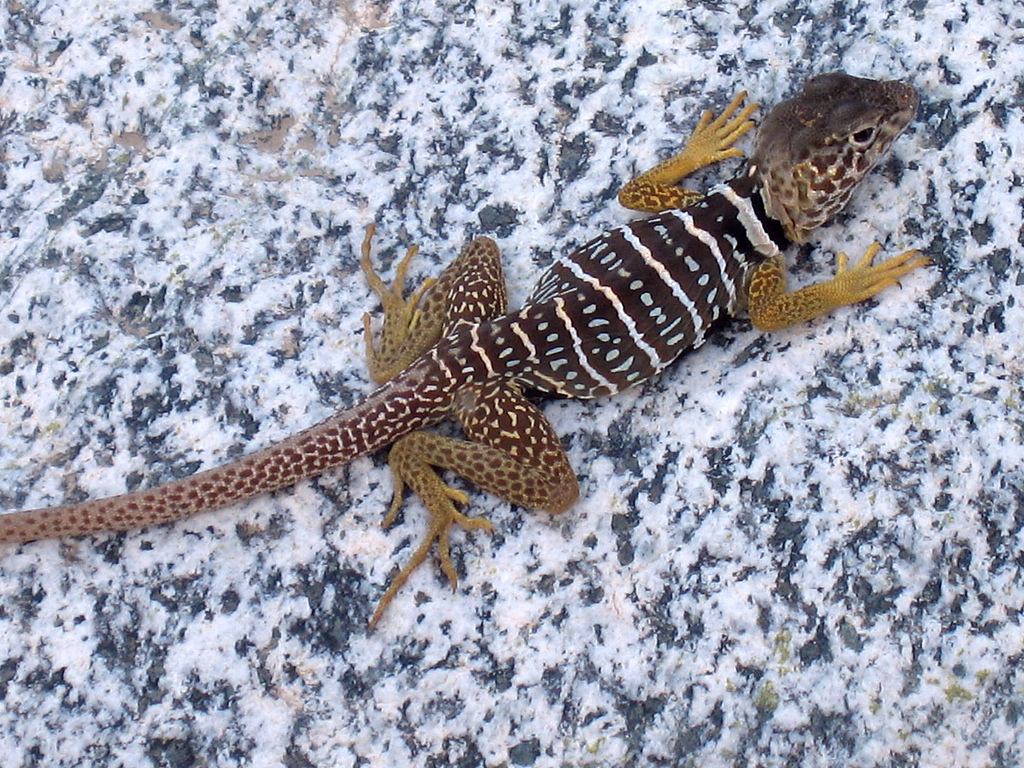

Conservation status
- Least Concern (IUCN 3.1)

Scientific classification
- Kingdom: Animalia
- Phylum: Chordata
- Class: Reptilia
- Order: Squamata
- Suborder: Iguania
- Family: Crotaphytidae
- Genus: Crotaphytus
- Species: C. vestigium

Binomial name
- Crotaphytus vestigium N.M. Smith & W.W. Tanner, 1972

Synonyms
- Crotaphytus fasciolatus Mocquard, 1903 (suppressed senior synonym); Crotaphytus insularis vestigium N.M. Smith & W.W. Tanner, 1972; Crotaphytus vestigium — Liner, 1994

= Baja California collared lizard =

Species of lizard

The Baja California collared lizard or Baja black-collared lizard (Crotaphytus vestigium) is a species of lizard in the family Crotaphytidae. The species is endemic to southern California (United States) and Baja California (Mexico).

== Description ==
The Baja California collared lizard is a large-bodied species of lizard with a broad head, short snout, granular scales, and two distinct black collar markings. The collar markings are separated at the dorsal midline by more than 12 pale scales. It is tan to olive-colored with broad dark crossbands on its body. Adults are between 6.9 and 11.2 cm (2.7 and 4.4 in) long (snout–vent length). Young lizards look similar to adults, but with more distinct banding. The males of this species have enlarged postanal scales, a blue-grey throat, and large dark blotches on their flanks.

== Behavior ==
C. vestigium is a powerful bipedal runner. Adults can inflict a painful bite.

== Habitat ==
The Baja California collared lizard is uncommon. It prefers rocky areas, especially washes.

== Conservation concerns ==
No major threats to C. vestigium have been identified, and it occurs in several protected areas.
