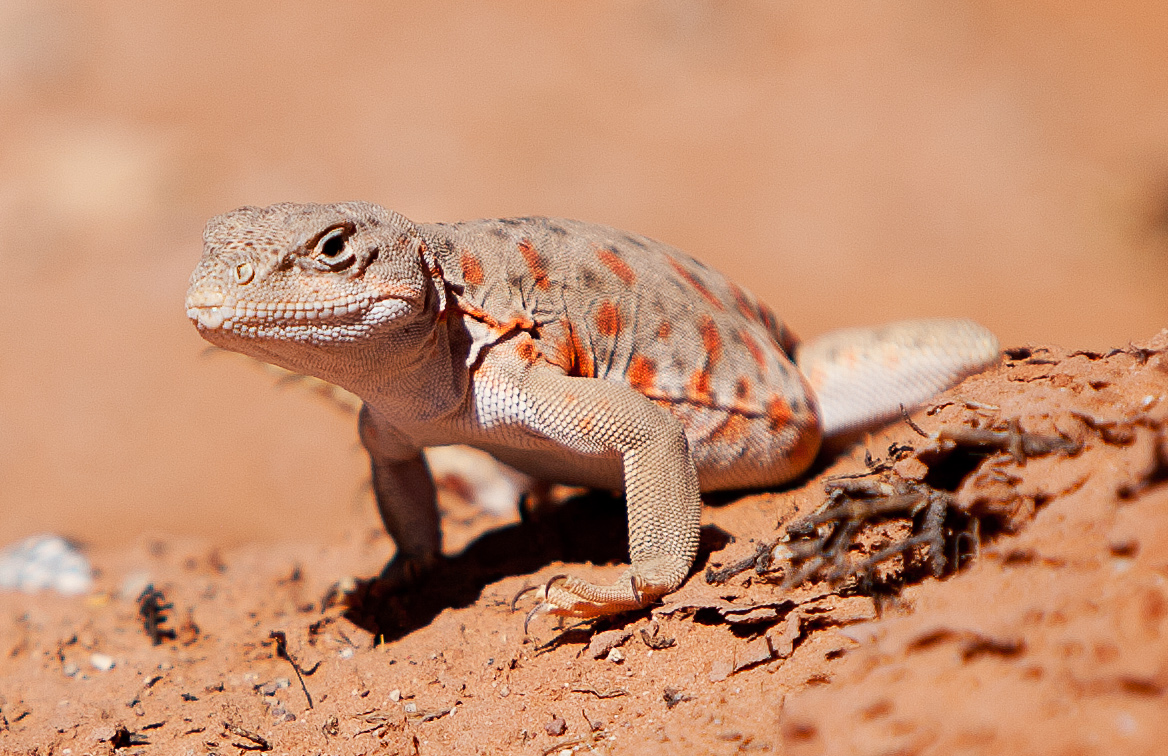
- Gambelia wislizenii, long-nosed leopard lizard

Scientific classification
- Kingdom: Animalia
- Phylum: Chordata
- Class: Reptilia
- Order: Squamata
- Suborder: Iguania
- Family: Crotaphytidae
- Genus: Gambelia; Baird, 1859

= Gambelia (lizard) =

Genus of lizards

Gambelia is a genus of lizards, commonly known as leopard lizards, within the family Crotaphytidae. Leopard lizards are indigenous to arid environments of southwestern North America. Specifically, in San Joaquin Valley and southeastern Carrizo Plain in California, is where the endangered species inhabits as it lives in isolated populations. Furthermore, the Gambelia Sila or leopard lizard is active during the spring to early summer for 2.5 months after they estivate and goes back into hibernation soon after.

== Description ==
Species in the genus Gambelia superficially resemble those of the genus Crotaphytus. However, one difference between the genera Gambelia and Crotaphytus is that leopard lizards have fracture planes in their tails, allowing the tails to break off when grasped by predators.

== Etymology ==
The generic name, Gambelia, is in honor of American naturalist William Gambel.

== Species ==
Three species are recognized as being valid.

Image	Scientific name	Common Name	Distribution
	Gambelia copeii (Yarrow, 1882)	Cope's leopard lizard	Baja California peninsula and adjacent southern California.
	Gambelia sila (Stejneger, 1890)	blunt-nosed leopard lizard	southern California.
	Gambelia wislizenii (Baird & Girard, 1852)	long-nosed leopard lizard	United States from Oregon to Idaho in the north and from California to Texas in the south, south to northern Mexico in Baja California, Sonora, Chihuahua, Coahuila, and Zacatecas.

Nota bene: A binomial authority in parentheses indicates that the species was originally described in a genus other than Gambelia.
