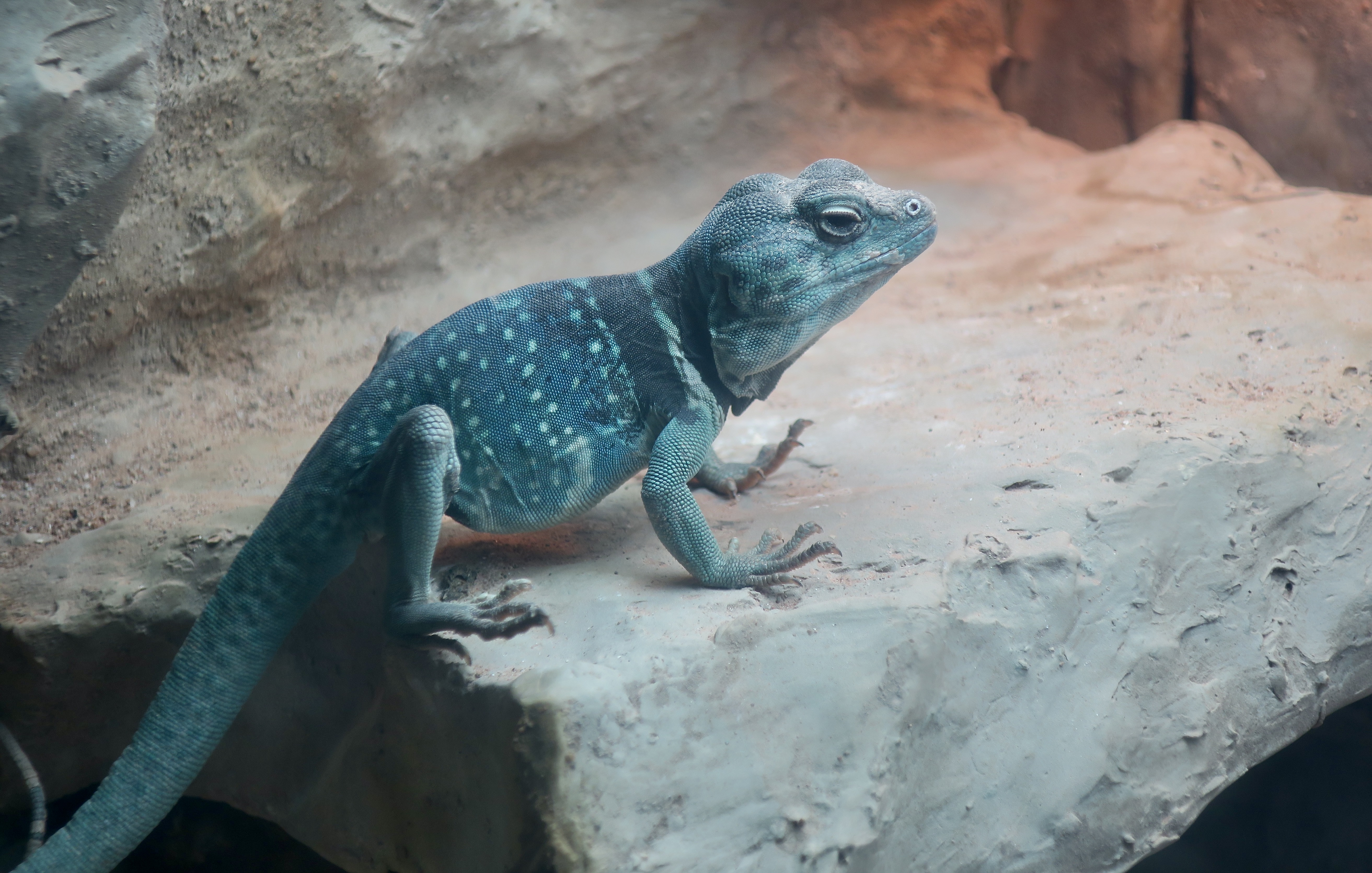
- At Phoenix Zoo.

Conservation status
- Least Concern (IUCN 3.1)

Scientific classification
- Kingdom: Animalia
- Phylum: Chordata
- Class: Reptilia
- Order: Squamata
- Suborder: Iguania
- Family: Crotaphytidae
- Genus: Crotaphytus
- Species: C. dickersonae

Binomial name
- Crotaphytus dickersonae Schmidt, 1922

Synonyms
- Crotaphytus collaris dickersonae — M. Allen, 1933

= Crotaphytus dickersonae =

Species of lizard

Crotaphytus dickersonae, also known commonly as Dickerson's collared lizard, the Mexican collared lizard, the Sonoran collared lizard, and el cachurón de azul de collar in Spanish, is a species of lizard in the family Crotaphytidae. The species is endemic to Mexico.

== Etymology ==
The specific name, dickersonae, is in honor of American herpetologist Mary Cynthia Dickerson.

== Geographic range ==
C. dickersonae is found in the Mexican state of Sonora, not only on the coastline but also on Tiburón Island in the Gulf of California.

== Habitat ==
The preferred natural habitats of C. dickersonae are shrubland and rocky areas.

== Reproduction ==
C. dickersonae is oviparous.
