= Friedrich Adolph Wislizenus =

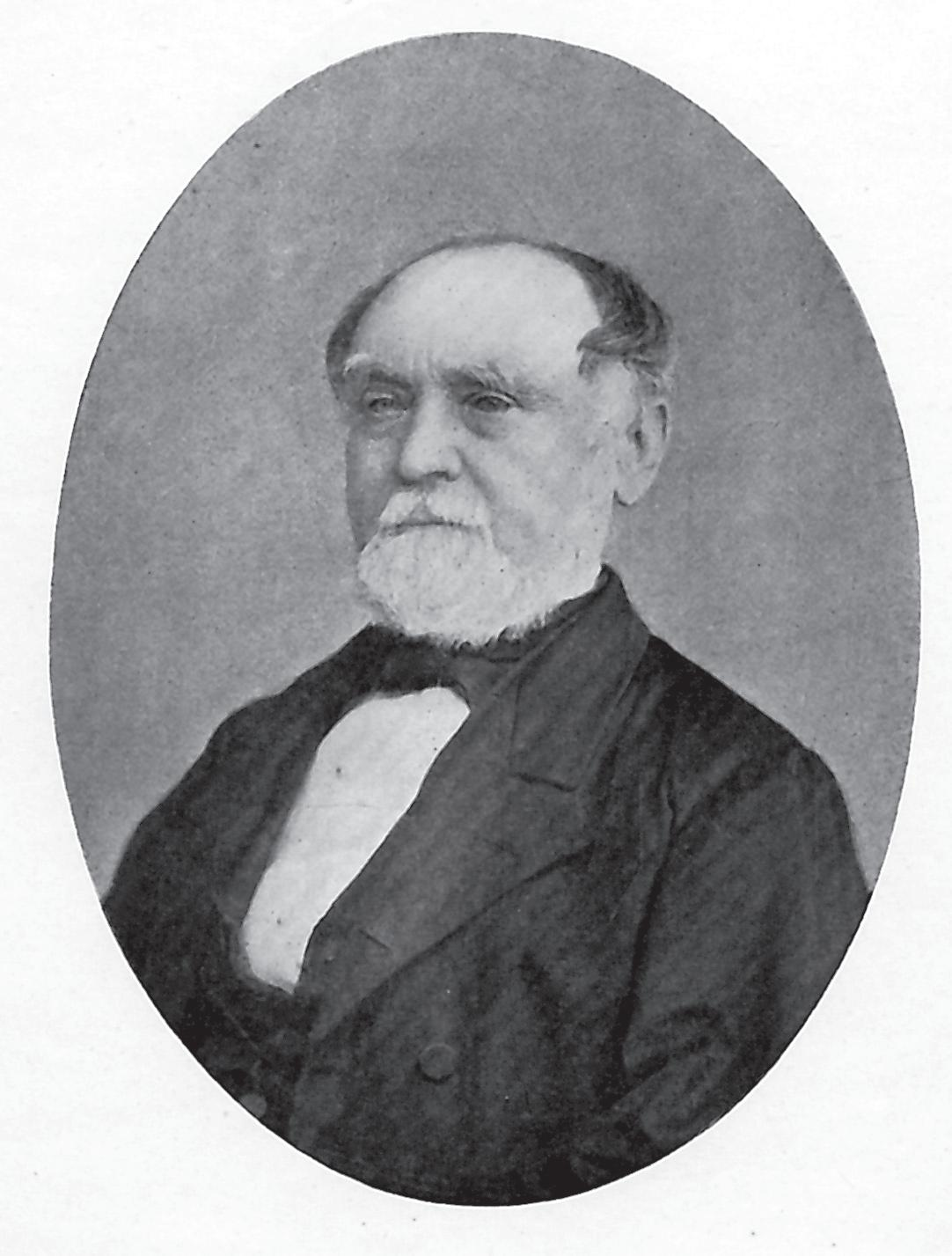
- Born: May 21, 1810; Königsee, Germany
- Died: September 23, 1889 (aged 79); St. Louis, Missouri, United States
- Citizenship: American
- Education: University of Tübingen, University of Göttingen
- Alma mater: University of Jena
- Occupations: Botanist, MD
- Years active: 1835–1889
- Spouse: Lucy Crane (1850–1889)
- Children: 5
- Parent(s): Johann C. A. Wislizenus; Margaretha Beck

Friedrich Adolph Wislizenus (first name sometimes spelled Frederick) (21 May 1810, Königsee – 23 September 1889) was a German-born American medical doctor, explorer and botanist. He is best known for his printed recollections from travels to Northern Mexico and today's state of New Mexico, as well as a number of species named after him.

== Life ==
Friedrich Adolph Wislizenus was born on May 21, 1810, in the German town of Königsee to a family of pastor Johann Christian Anton Wislizenus as the youngest of three children; the roots of the family lead to 16th century Kingdom of Poland; therefrom, their ancestor, Jan Wiślicki emigrated first to the Kingdom of Hungary and later Schwarzburg-Rudolstadt. Both of his parents died in the early 1810s as victims of epidemic brought by Napoleon's soldiers retreating from Moscow; the orphaned children were taken into custody by their mother's brother, Hoffman, a man of the law.

Wislizenus began his education towards becoming a clergyman at the Gymnasium of Rudolstadt; fragments of Hebrew would resurface throughout the course of his later life. Yet the interest in natural sciences prevailed and he entered the neighbouring University of Jena in hopes of becoming a doctor of medicine. Universities of Tübingen and Göttingen were his next steps.

On April 3, 1833, he played a serious part in the Frankfurter Wachensturm, a failed attempt to overthrow monarchy in Germany which was speedily crushed. Some of Wislizenus' colleagues were imprisoned, others, among whom was Friedrich Adolph fled. He followed Johann Lukas Schönlein and left for Zürich, Switzerland.

Wislizenus graduated in 1834 and sought employment in Paris; upon finding none, he set sail for New York. Having familiarized himself with the language and country he remained there for two years working actively as a pamphleteer and poet. In 1837 he joined his fellow exiles in St. Clair County, Illinois, where he practised in Mascoutah but finding the country life dull and monotonous he ventured to St. Louis in 1839. There he found a long-sought opportunity. Accompanying one of the expeditions of Rocky Mountain Fur Company he embarked on a journey to the west. With the pioneers he traveled far into the North-West, towards the source of Green River in the Wind River Mountains. When the trappers turned back home Wislizenus joined a band of Flathead and Nez Perce with whom he crossed the Rocky Mountains. With no guide willing to lead him through the Sierra Nevada, he ventured back along the banks of Arkansas River to the border of Missouri. The trip proved to be purely recreational due to the inability of finding facilities and lack of instruments.

Upon returning to St. Louis in 1840 he resumed his practice and soon became involved in various citizen activities of a growing city and country. He was a regular attendant at the Western Academy of Natural Sciences where he aided his compatriot and friend, George Engelmann.

In 1846 his longing for exploration took hold and he joined a merchant expedition to Santa Fe. This time he was better prepared. Reaching the city, news of War between USA and Mexico emerged. Despite that Wislizenus managed to pass the border and traveled to Chihuahua where the whole group was imprisoned. Several months in a secluded mountain village resulted in collection of notes, observations and sketches concerning northern Mexico. Finally the prisoners were freed by Colonel Doniphan in the spring of 1847 and that same year Friedrich Adolph returned to St. Louis. Due to the effort of senator Thomas H. Benton, with whom he became acquainted, the young explorer was summoned to Washington, D.C., and requested to publish his recollections. Memoir of a Tour to Northern Mexico in 1846 and 1847 by A. Wislizenus, M.D. corrected erroneous views on the western country and provided in-depth description (with maps and sketches) of the lands near the Rio Grande. The Senate ordered printing of 5,000 copies for distribution.

Among the trophies brought from the voyage were many new plants, later studied by Dr. George Engelmann, who in gratitude to his explorer-friend, named some of the specimens with Wislizenus' name, including Wislizenia refracta.

While engaged in publishing his memoirs, Wislizenus met his future wife, Lucy Crane, sister-in-law of George Perkins Marsh.

In 1849 he returned to St. Louis and served with vigour and devotion during the outbreak of cholera. As soon as the epidemic ceased he traveled to Istanbul, where G.P. Marsh served as United States Minister to Turkey, and where he married Lucy at the Embassy on July 23, 1850. After visiting his hometown in Thuringen and some of the ancient cities of Europe, the newly married couple returned to the USA.

After a brief voyage to Panama and the Pacific Coast Wislizenus returned to St. Louis in 1852 and never left it again (save recreational trips to Kimmswick, Missouri). For the rest of his life he pursued scientific interests; he was one of the founders of the St. Louis Academy of Science, and indulged in meteorological and botanical studies until failing eyesight wouldn't allow. It culminated in total blindness a few years before his death yet there were always enthusiastic readers to entertain his eager mind.

Friedrich Adolph Wislizenus died on September 23, 1889, leaving a rich intellectual heritage.

Wislizenus is commemorated in the scientific name of a species of North American lizard, Gambelia wislizenii.
