= Crotaphytus insularis =

Conservation status
- Least Concern (IUCN 3.1)

Scientific classification
- Kingdom: Animalia
- Phylum: Chordata
- Class: Reptilia
- Order: Squamata
- Suborder: Iguania
- Family: Crotaphytidae
- Genus: Crotaphytus
- Species: C. insularis

Binomial name
- Crotaphytus insularis Van Denburgh & Slevin, 1921

Species of lizard

Crotaphytus insularis, the eastern collared lizard, is a species of lizard found in Mexico.
