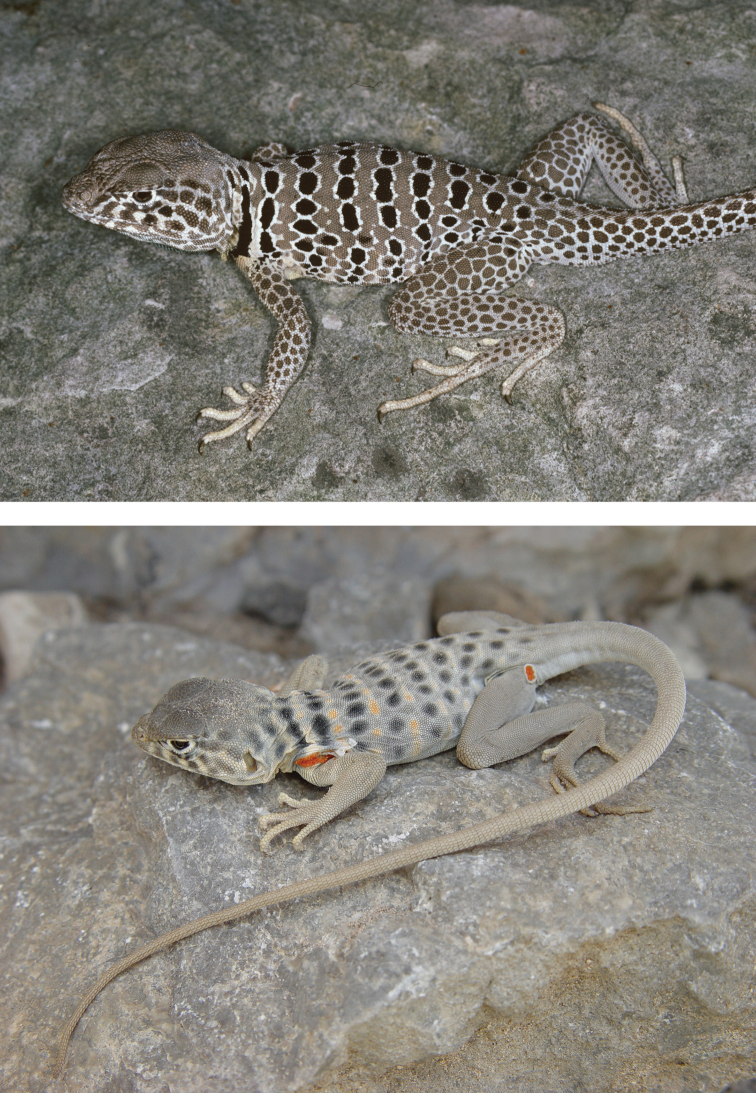
- Crotaphytus antiquus (top: male; bottom: female)

Conservation status
- Endangered (IUCN 3.1)

Scientific classification
- Kingdom: Animalia
- Phylum: Chordata
- Class: Reptilia
- Order: Squamata
- Suborder: Iguania
- Family: Crotaphytidae
- Genus: Crotaphytus
- Species: C. antiquus

Binomial name
- Crotaphytus antiquus Axtell & Webb, 1995

= Venerable collared lizard =

Species of lizard

The venerable collared lizard (Crotaphytus antiquus) is a species of lizard in the family Crotaphytidae. The species is native to northern Mexico.

== Geographic range ==
C. antiquus is restricted to the area of Sierra San Lorenzo, Sierra Texas, and Sierra Solis in extreme southwestern Coahuila state.

== Reproduction ==
C. antiquus is oviparous.

== Conservation status ==
C. antiquus is classified as Endangered (EN) on the IUCN Red List. Major threats to the population include habitat degradation, mainly due to gravel extraction for building materials in nearby urban areas.
