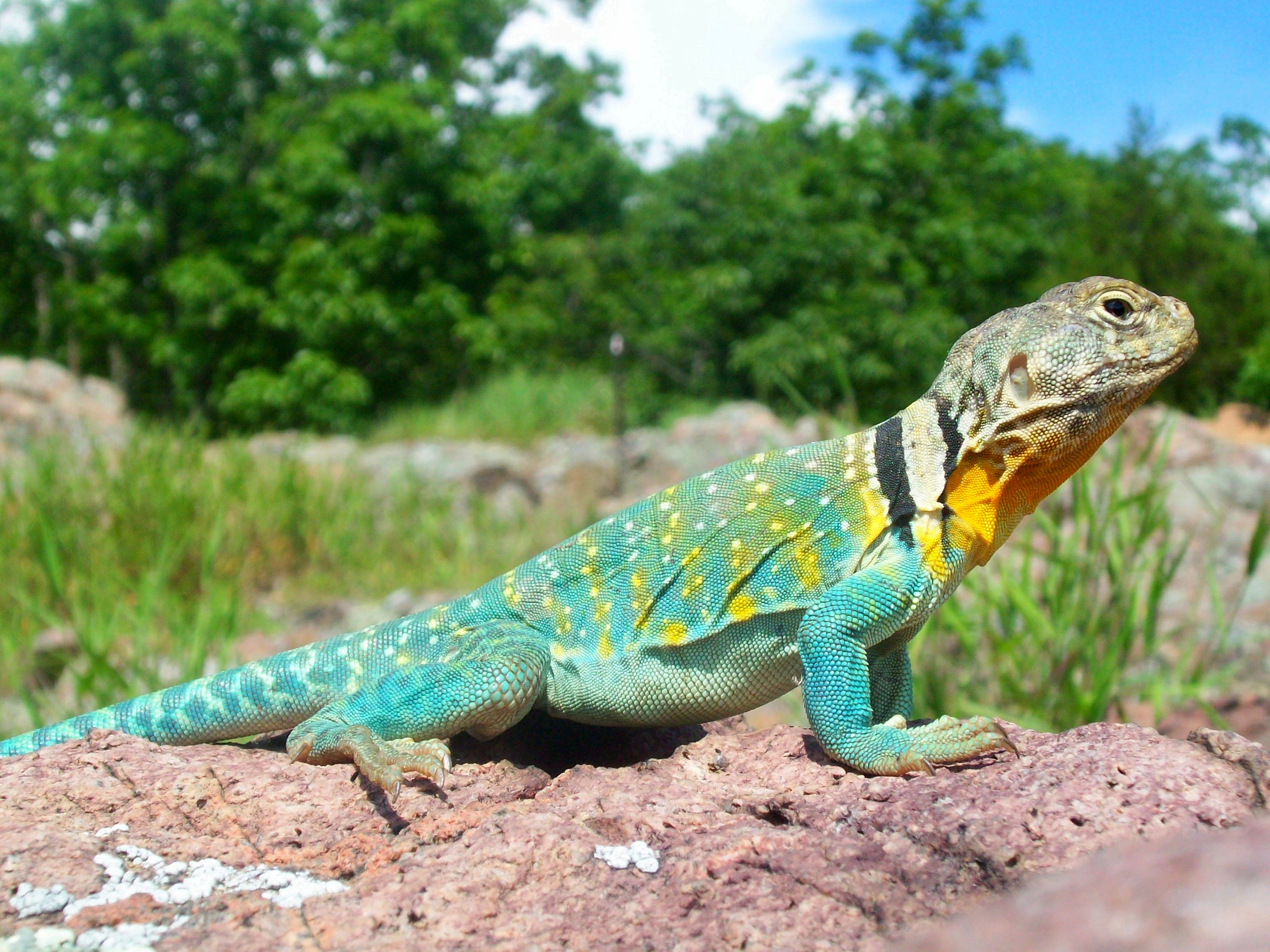
- A male common collared lizard in Taum Sauk Mountain State Park, Missouri
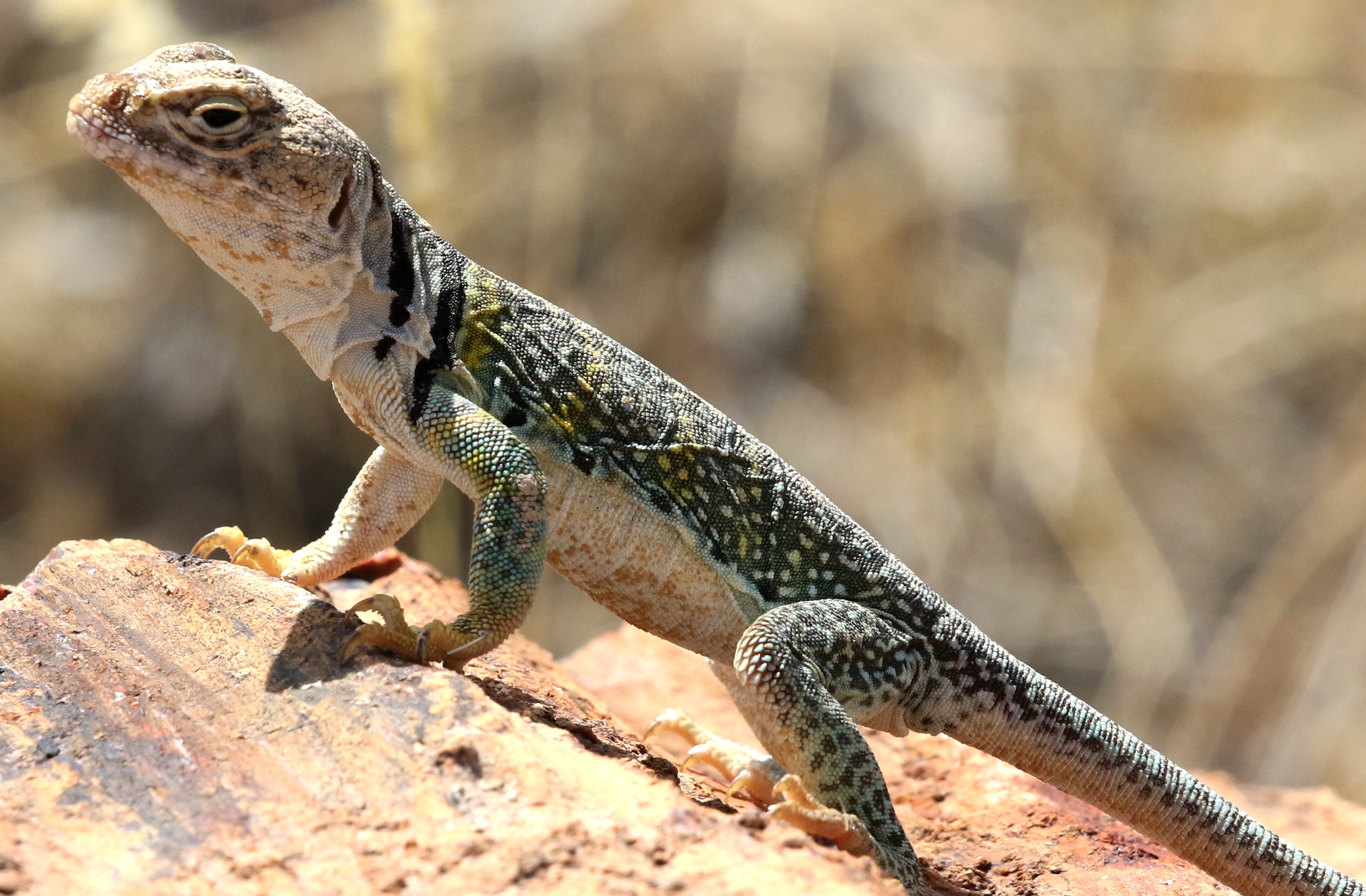
- Female in Petrified Forest National Park, Arizona

Conservation status
- Least Concern (IUCN 3.1)

Scientific classification
- Kingdom: Animalia
- Phylum: Chordata
- Class: Reptilia
- Order: Squamata
- Suborder: Iguania
- Family: Crotaphytidae
- Genus: Crotaphytus
- Species: C. collaris

Binomial name
- Crotaphytus collaris (Say, 1823)

Synonyms
- Agama collaris Say, 1823; Crotaphytus collaris — Holbrook, 1842; Leiosaurus collaris — A.H.A. Duméril, 1856; Crotaphytus collaris — Boulenger, 1885

= Common collared lizard =

Species of reptile

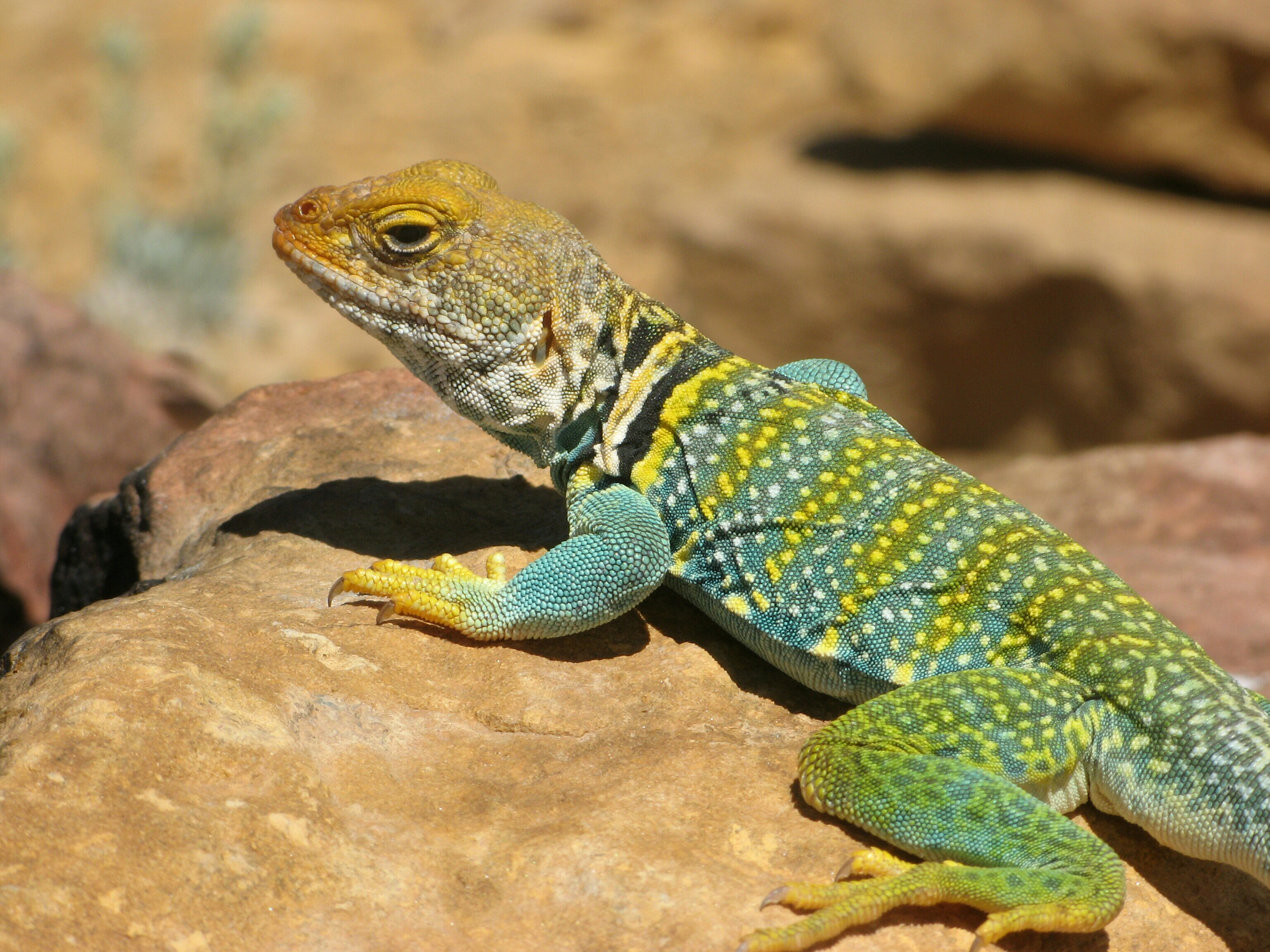
A male common collared lizard (Crotaphytus collaris) near Hatch Point, Utah

The common collared lizard (Crotaphytus collaris), also commonly called eastern collared lizard, Oklahoma collared lizard, mountain boomer, yellow-headed collared lizard, and collared lizard, is a North American species of lizard in the family Crotaphytidae. The common name "collared lizard" comes from the lizard's distinct coloration, which includes bands of black around the neck and shoulders that look like a collar. Males can be very colorful, with blue-green bodies, yellow stripes on the tail and back, and yellow-orange throats. Five subspecies are recognized.

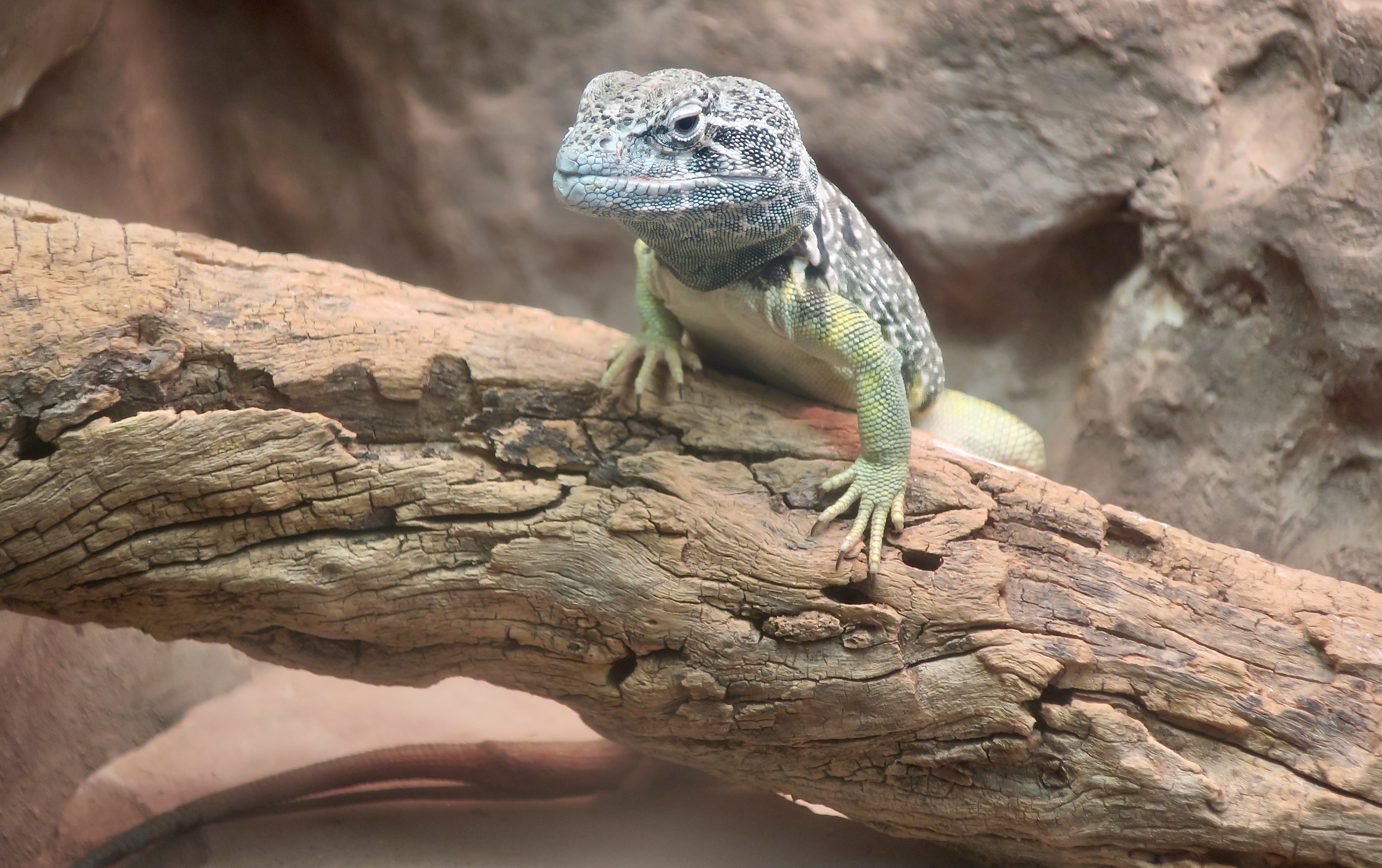
Black-spotted collared lizard (Crotaphytus collaris melanomaculatus) at Phoenix Zoo.

== Etymology ==
The subspecific name, baileyi, is in honor of American mammalogist Vernon Orlando Bailey.

== Subspecies ==
The five subspecies recognized as being valid, including the nominotypical subspecies, are:

- Crotaphytus collaris auriceps Fitch & W. Tanner, 1951 – yellow-headed collared lizard
- C. c. baileyi Stejneger, 1890 – western collared lizard
- C. c. collaris (Say, 1823) – eastern collared lizard
- C. collaris fuscus W. Ingram & W. Tanner, 1971 – Chihuahuan collared lizard
- C. c. melanomaculatus Axtell & Webb, 1995 – black-spotted collared lizard

Nota bene: A trinomial authority in parentheses indicates that the subspecies was originally described in a genus other than Crotaphytus.

== Description ==
C. collaris can grow from 8 to 15 in (20 to 38 cm) in total length (including the tail), with a large head and powerful jaws. Males have a blue-green body with a light brown head. Females have a light brown head and body. C. collaris exhibits a wide range of physical characteristics, particularly in coloration and spotting patterns, and this phenotypic variability may be attributed to a combination of differences in population, social organizations, or habitat. They are a sexually dichromatic lizard species, with the adult males being more vivid and colorful than the females. Male dorsal and head color tend to range from green to tan and yellow to orange, respectively, while females, overall, possess more muted body pigmentations, varying from brown to gray. However, when reproductively active during breeding seasons, females undergo a rapid color change, in which faint orange spots on their heads increase in brightness; this orange spotting reaches a maximum during egg maturation, but gradually fades again after expulsion from the female's oviduct as she lays her eggs. Both males and females have two distinct black bands around their necks, providing additional context to their name, the common collared lizards.

Similar to adult females, juveniles also exhibit dull body colorations compared to adult males, but a key distinction is that the young have pronounced, dark brown markings that eventually fade as they grow and mature. Consequently, juvenile collared lizards lose this sharp cross-band pattern, and their features drastically change to resemble those of the adult forms.

Moderate in size, C. collaris has a disproportionately large head and long hind limbs. It can reach a typical length of 14 inches, including the tail, with males being larger than females. Hence, they are sexually dimorphic, and adult males exhibit larger and more muscular heads than females, which tend to vary in size. Used as a weapon during male combat, the head dimensions play a key role in determining dominance, territoriality, fitness, and mating success. In general, bigger heads are associated with greater jaw strength and thus, bite force.

== Bipedal locomotion ==
Like many other lizards, including the frilled lizard and basilisk, the collared lizard can run on its hind legs and is a relatively fast sprinter. This behavior is usually observed when trying to escape predators.Record speeds have been around 26 km/h (16 mph), much slower than the world record for lizards, 34.6 km/h (21.5 mph), attained by the larger-bodied Costa Rican spiny-tailed iguana, Ctenosaura similis.

== Geographic range and habitat ==
C. collaris is chiefly found in dry, open regions of northern Mexico and the Southwestern United States, including Arizona, Arkansas, Colorado, Kansas, Missouri, New Mexico, Oklahoma, and Texas. The full extent of its habitat in the United States ranges from the Ozark Mountains to western Arizona. Individuals occupy a range of different habitats from rocky desert landscapes to grasslands, but they often prefer to inhabit mountainous regions with high environmental temperatures for optimal thermoregulation. In addition, the hilly topography allows these keen and highly alert lizards to stay hidden between rocks, despite their flamboyant features, and look out for potential predators or territory intruders from elevated platforms.

== Diet ==
As obligate carnivores, they consume insects and small vertebrates as their main diet. While they may occasionally ingest plant material, it is not preferred. They feed on a variety of large insects, including crickets, grasshoppers, spiders, moths, beetles, and cicadas, along with other small lizards and even snakes. As plants do not provide enough nutrients for constant body weight maintenance, C. collaris cannot survive solely on an herbivorous diet. Their stomachs are too small to accommodate the amount of flowers, shrubs, herbs, etc. that would be needed to maintain a constant body weight. Thus, they are considered obligate carnivores, requiring nutrients from arthropods or other small reptiles (such as other lizards).

Diet can also vary depending on age, sex, and seasonal changes. Younger lizards consume the same kinds of foods, specifically insect species, that adults do, but since younger lizards and adults differ in body size and weight, the amount of food they take in tends to vary. Male and female adults, though, are similar in terms of their sizes and the amounts of food ingested, but differ drastically in the kinds of foods that they eat. From an evolutionary standpoint, these sexual differences in diet may act to reduce intraspecies competition for resources, whereby females and males do not need to fight for the same type of food. Moreover, changes in season (availability) can drastically affect their diets, as well.

== Cultural impact ==
The collared lizard is the state reptile of Oklahoma, where it is known as the mountain boomer. The origin of the name is not clear, but it may be traceable to settlers traveling west during the Gold Rush. One theory is that settlers mistook the sound of wind in canyons for the call of an animal in an area where the collared lizard was abundant. In reality, collared lizards are silent.

== Behavior ==
Collared lizards are diurnal; they are active during the day, and spend most of their time basking on top of elevated rocks or boulders. As a highly territorial species, they remain hypervigilant, scanning for predators or intruders, ready to sprint or fight when necessary. Generally, males are more active than females, as the former engage in more chase, fight, display, and courtship behaviors, while the latter exhibit basking and foraging behaviors. The collared lizard in the wild has been the subject of a number of studies of sexual selection; in captivity, if two males are placed in the same cage, they fight to the death. Females, though, do not demonstrate aggressive behaviors as frequently as males, experiencing less intraspecies competition with other females.

=== Social behavior ===
To monopolize as many female mates as they can, a male C. collaris viciously defends his exclusive territory through aggression, patrolling activities, and displays. These territories provide ample resources and shelter the harem of females claimed and protected by the male territory owners. However, when agonistic interactions between male rivals escalate to violent fights, both lizards must expend substantial amounts of energy and risk getting seriously injured. Thus, though males do actively exclude other males from territories, they do so without resorting to physical and unfavorable conflict. Instead, they partake in social displays, either at a distance or proximally from their competitors to advertise their superiority. Surprisingly, both types of social encounters, in which males perform push-ups and compressions and elevations of the trunk with the dewlap extended, rarely lead to arduous and violent fights; rather, distant displays barely evoke a response while proximal confrontations may lead to chasing at most.

Furthermore, C. collaris territory owners exhibit differential behaviors in response to neighbors and strangers, in which residents reduce the cost of territorial defense by demonstrating less aggression for spatial neighbors. Thus, when nearby residents approach an owner's shared territorial boundaries, the owner will recognize this individual and only engage in aggressive behaviors, usually in the form of a costly fight, if a threat to its territory is perceived. In the case of a stranger, though, the owner will exhibit intense hostility towards the intruder without hesitation. In relation, male territorial behaviors also vary within the reproductive season, decreasing in June due to the higher prevalence of reproductively active females and instead engaging in more courtship behaviors. This cost-benefit strategy demonstrates the complex social behaviors and decision-making processes exhibited by male collared lizards.

== Reproduction ==
The reproductive season starts in mid-March to early April and concludes in mid-July. Females and smaller individuals emerge first from hibernation, with males following around two weeks later. Though lizards are considered mature and may breed following their first hibernation, those that are two years and older exhibit greater reproductive success due to their larger size. In late May, courtship occurs between adult males and females. Subsequently, mature females, typically two years and older, produce their first clutches and lay them in a burrow or under a rock about two weeks after copulation. They may then go on to produce second and sometimes even third clutches throughout June until mid-July. The eggs are incubated in a temperature-dependent manner, and the incubation period may vary from 50 to 100 days. Typically, clutch size can range from four to six eggs, but larger, older females can produce more. By August, adults begin to hibernate again, and juveniles do the same after hatching. The earliest of the clutches can hatch in mid-July and later ones follow until mid-October. Upon hatching, juveniles are fully developed and behave independently of their parents, as C. collaris does not exhibit any parental care.

=== Mating behavior and rituals ===
C. collaris males are polygamous, which leads to intense territorial behaviors that include male-to-male competition for females, which triggers aggressive behaviors and induces fierce competition for mating. For female selection of male mates, they not only prefer males that are bright and conspicuous in body coloration, but also consider the resources such as food and territory that males may be able to provide to ensure reproductive success. Moreover, as males often must compete with other males for potential mates, their body and head sizes play a significant role in determining mating success. The variability in head size gives rise to differential jaw strength and bite force in males, which ultimately results in selection against smaller-headed males. For example, if an instance of male-to-male conflict escalates into a violent fight between two males, the larger male with a substantially larger body mass and head size will overpower his weaker and smaller counterpart. Consequently, successful males may, more often than not, possess vibrant body coloration and patterns and may be bigger in size, specifically having larger head proportions.

During courtship rituals, a male or a female lizard approaches the opposite sex within a body length and subsequently engages in various behavioral patterns, which include either individual superimposing its limbs, torso, or tail over its partner, mounting the dorsum of the other lizard, males nudging females with their snouts or grasping them with their jaws, and mutual displays. These mutual displays involve a complex set of movements and behaviors, unique to each sex. Males flex their forelimbs up and down and extend their dewlaps, while females also extend their dewlaps and raise the base of their tails to signal receptivity. At the end of this courting process, both sexes walk in circles, making sure to remain within a body length of one another throughout.

=== Sex determination ===
C. collaris sex is determined by chromosomes passed from the parents producing either a male or female. However, some research suggested that possible override of incubation temperatures could change the sex of the developing embryo.

== Gallery ==
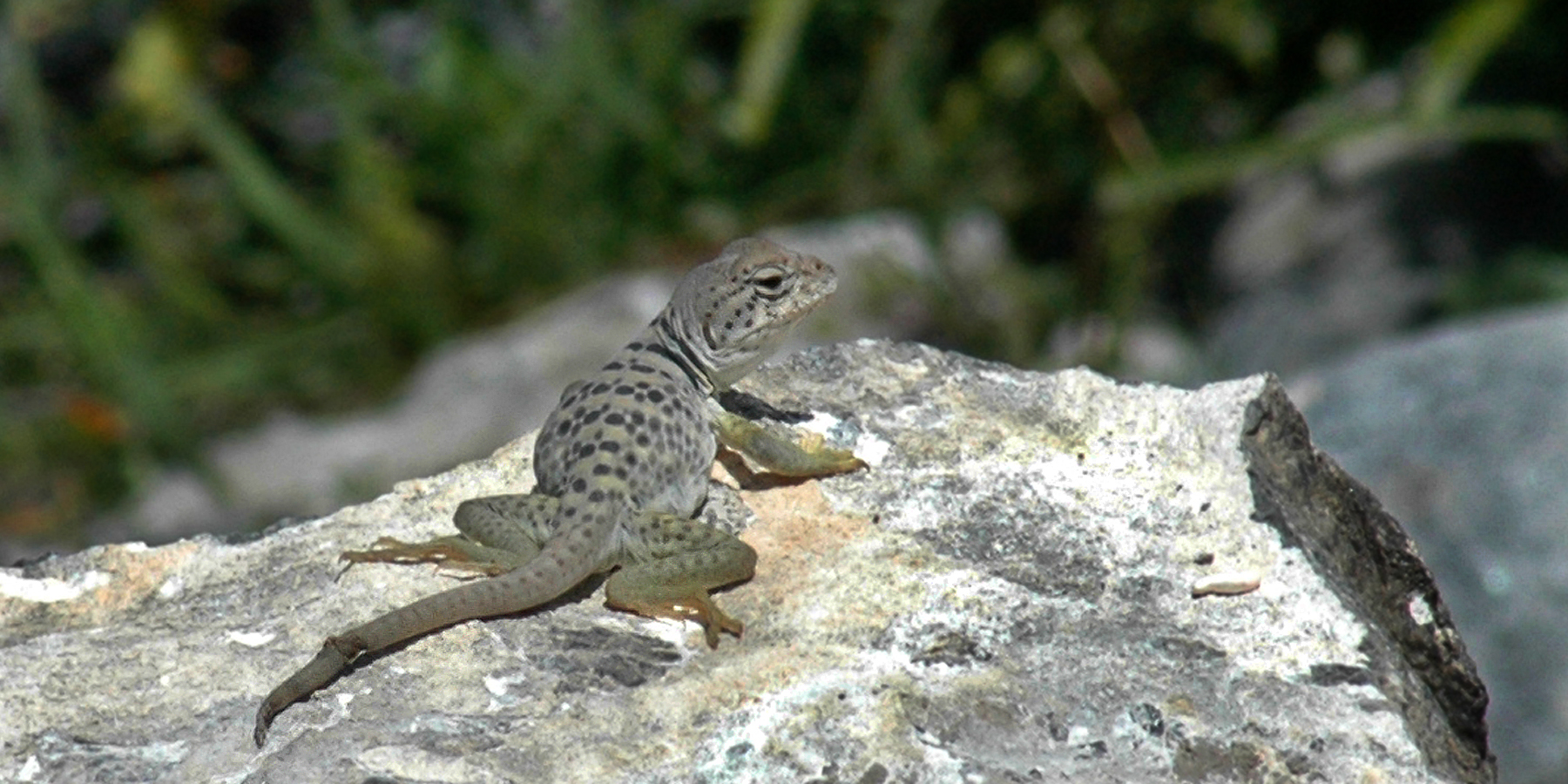
Eastern collared lizard (C. c. melanomaculatus), subadult photographed in situ, municipality of Miquihuana, Tamaulipas, Mexico (19 September 2007)

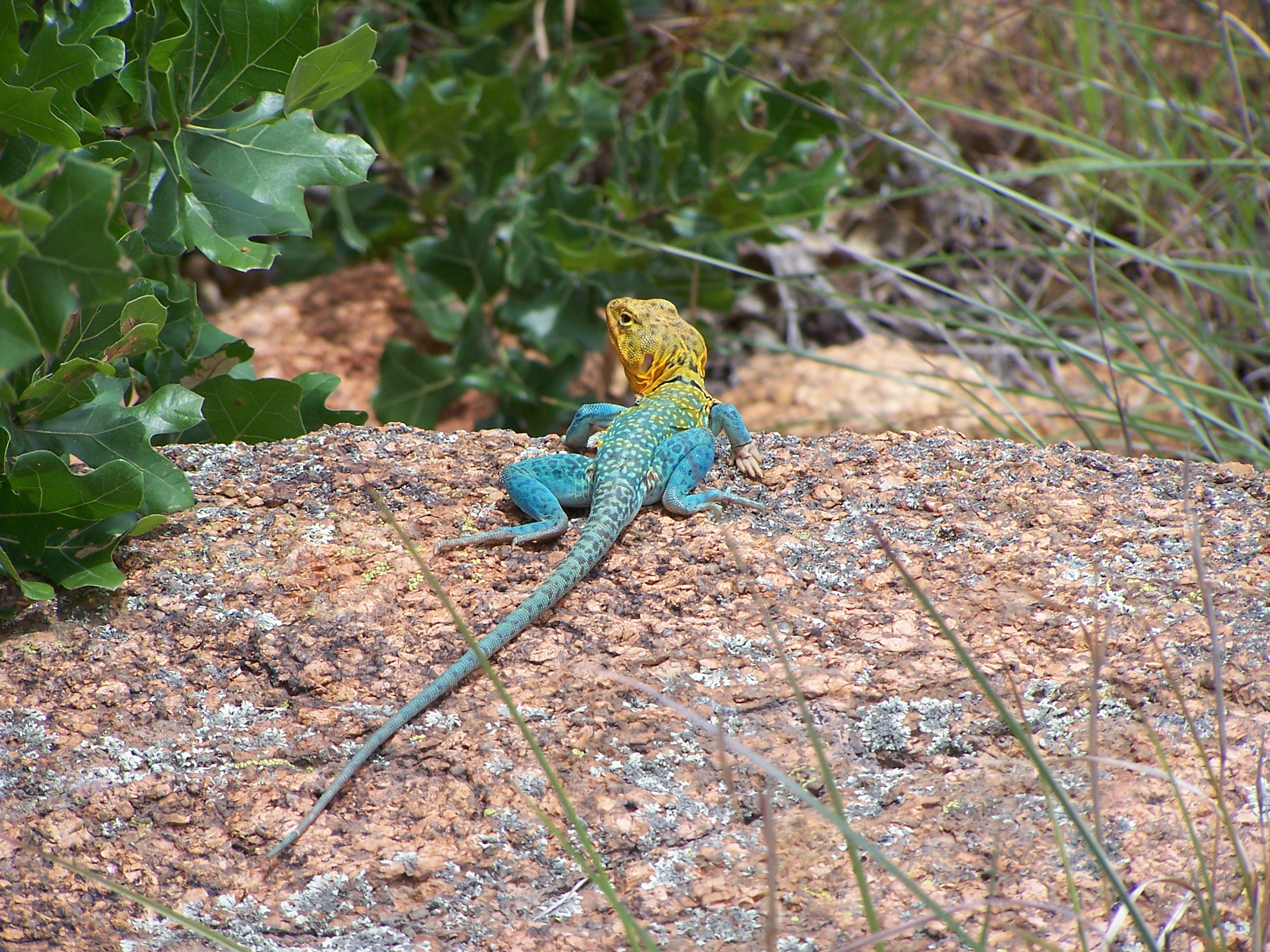
Male collared lizard, with blue-green body and yellow-brown head, at the Wichita Mountains Wildlife Refuge near Lawton, Oklahoma
