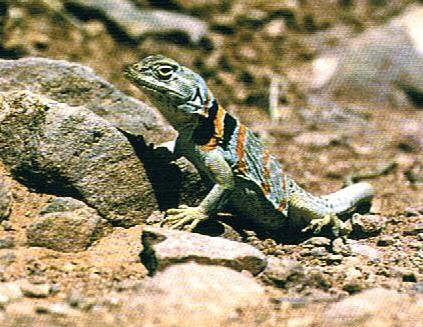
- Crotaphytus collaris

Scientific classification
- Kingdom: Animalia
- Phylum: Chordata
- Class: Reptilia
- Order: Squamata
- Suborder: Iguania
- Family: Crotaphytidae
- Genus: Crotaphytus; Holbrook, 1842

= Crotaphytus =

Genus of lizards

Crotaphytus is a genus of lizards, commonly known as collared lizards, in the family Crotaphytidae. Member species are small to medium-sized predators indigenous to the American southwest, Baja peninsula, and Mexico. Including the tail, they can be as small as 7 in (18 cm) or as long as 14 in (36 cm), and are characterized by distinct bands of black or brown around the neck, to which their common names refer.

== Species ==
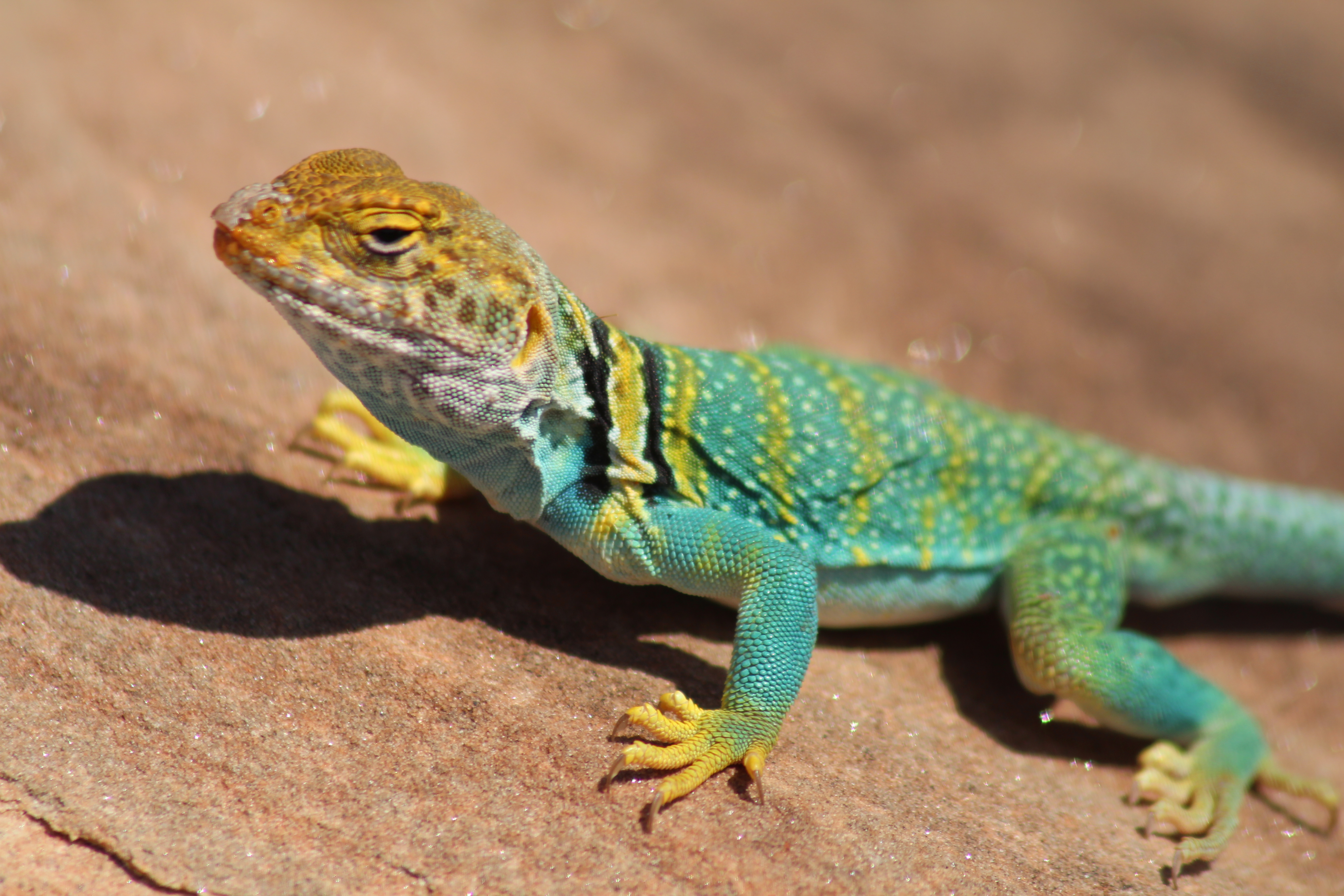
A collared lizard posing on a rock in Colorado

The following species and subspecies are recognized as being valid.

Image	Scientific name	Common name	Distribution
	Crotaphytus antiquus Axtell & Webb, 1995	venerable collared lizard	Sierra San Lorenzo, Sierra Texas, and Sierra Solis in extreme southwestern Coahuila state, Mexico
	Crotaphytus bicinctores N.M. Smith & W.W. Tanner, 1972	Great Basin collared lizard or desert collared lizard	Western United States
	Crotaphytus collaris (Say, 1823)	common collared lizard	Mexico and the south-central United States (Arizona, Arkansas, Colorado, Kansas, Missouri, New Mexico, Oklahoma, and Texas)
	Crotaphytus dickersonae K.P. Schmidt, 1922	Sonoran collared lizard	Mexico
	Crotaphytus grismeri McGuire, 1994	Grismer's collared lizard	Baja California, Mexico
	Crotaphytus insularis Van Denburgh & Slevin, 1921	eastern collared lizard	Mexico
	Crotaphytus nebrius Axtell & Montanucci, 1977	Sonoran collared lizard	U.S. state of Arizona and the Mexican state of Sonora
	Crotaphytus reticulatus Baird, 1858	reticulated collared lizard	US state of Texas, Mexico (Coahuila, Nuevo León, and Tamaulipas)
	Crotaphytus vestigium N.M. Smith & W.W. Tanner, 1972	Baja California collared lizard	California (United States) and Baja California (Mexico)

Nota bene: A binomial authority in parentheses or a trinomial authority in parentheses indicates that the species or subspecies was originally described in a genus other than Crotaphytus.

== Symbol ==
In 1969, Oklahoma designated its first state reptile when it chose the collared lizard.
