= H. C. Yarrow =

American ornithologist, herpetologist, naturalist and surgeon

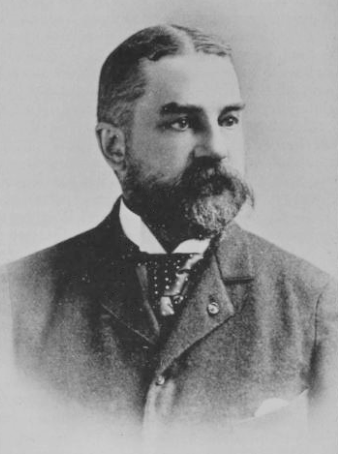
- Born: Henry Crécy Yarrow; November 19, 1840; Philadelphia, Pennsylvania, U.S.
- Died: July 2, 1929 (aged 88); Hampton, Virginia, U.S.
- Burial place: Arlington National Cemetery
- Education: University of Pennsylvania

Henry Crécy "H. C." Yarrow (November 19, 1840 – July 2, 1929) was an American ornithologist, herpetologist, naturalist, and surgeon.

== Biography ==
Henry Crecy Yarrow was born on November 19, 1840, in Philadelphia, Pennsylvania. He attended preparatory schools in both Pennsylvania and Geneva, Switzerland. In 1859, Yarrow began his medical studies at the University of Pennsylvania, earning his M.D. in 1861.

Upon the outbreak of the Civil War, Yarrow was appointed as Medical Examiner of recruits for the Pennsylvania Reserves. In 1862 he was made Acting Assistant Surgeon, 5th PA Cavalry, U.S. Army and returned to Philadelphia as the Executive Officer of the Broad and Cherry Streets Hospital. Except for a brief tour of duty in the Fort Sumter area, Yarrow served at this hospital until the end of the Civil War. An outbreak of cholera in 1866 prompted him to return to active duty. He volunteered for service in Atlanta and Tybee Island, Georgia. Yarrow too was struck with cholera and was transferred into recovery in New York, where he returned to examining recruits. During another cholera outbreak, in 1867, he served at Fort Wood in New York Harbor, as well as at Baltimore, Maryland, and North Carolina.

In 1871, Yarrow met Elliott Coues, a noted naturalist and author, and it is believed that this meeting awakened Yarrow's interest in ornithology, or the study of birds. In 1872, Yarrow received an offer to join Lt. George Wheeler's explorations into the West of the 100th Meridian as surgeon and naturalist. This was his opportunity to pursue his interests in the natural sciences. While on duty he prepared for publication a volume of zoology and made observations relating to a mono graph he would go on to publish years later - Introduction to the Study of Mortuary Customs among North American Indians. He collected in portions of Nevada, California, Colorado and New Mexico.

During this time, Yarrow also acted as an Assistant to the U.S. Fish Commission (1872), the first Curator of Reptiles at the National Museum (1872–1880), and spent two conducting expeditions through the West collecting specimens for the Medical and National Museums (1886 & 1887). He made extensive studies into the treatment of rabies and antidotes for snake venom. He is also credited with devising new types of surgical instruments and improved surgical techniques.

In 1879, Henry Yarrow reported to Surgeon John Shaw Billings as an assistant on the Medical Index Catalogue project. He remained at this post nearly ten years, reading proof and preparing manuscript for the monumental catalogue of the Library of the Surgeon General's Office (now the National Medical Library). He worked so diligently on this project that his sight was temporarily impaired, he was forced to take time off to recuperate. Afterwards, he resumed his duties as Assistant to the Attending Surgeon of the U.S. Army Dispensary in Washington, where he remained until 1893. Yarrow also served as Professor of Dermatology at George Washington University and Consulting Surgeon to the Women's Clinic at the University Hospital.

Additional roles performed by Henry Yarrow from 1886 to 1917:

- Assistant to the Commander of the Model Military Hospital at the Centennial Exposition in Philadelphia, Pennsylvania.
- Worked in the Surgeon General of the United States office, War Department and was assigned to the Section of Comparative Anatomy at the Army Medical Museum.
- In charge of the Barnes Hospital, US Soldier's Home.
- Accompanied Pan American delegates on their travels in the US. Remained as a medical officer of the Pan American Congress until its adjournment.
- Appointed a trustee of George Washington University.
- First Lieutenant in the Medical Reserve Corps of the US Army, 1908.
- Major, Medical Section of the Officers' Reserve Corps, 1917.
- Promoted to Lt. Colonel, Medical Corps of the Army of the US before the end of WWI.

Henry Crecy Yarrow was a member of the American Association for the Advancement for Science and the Cosmos Club, where he was a founding member, vice-president in 1886 and 1887, and club president in 1888.

He died from heart disease at the Chamberlin-Vanderbilt Hotel in Hampton, Virginia on July 2, 1929, and was buried at Arlington National Cemetery.

== Species named in honor of Yarrow ==
In 1875 Edward Drinker Cope named the lizard Sceloporus jarrovii in honor of Yarrow.
