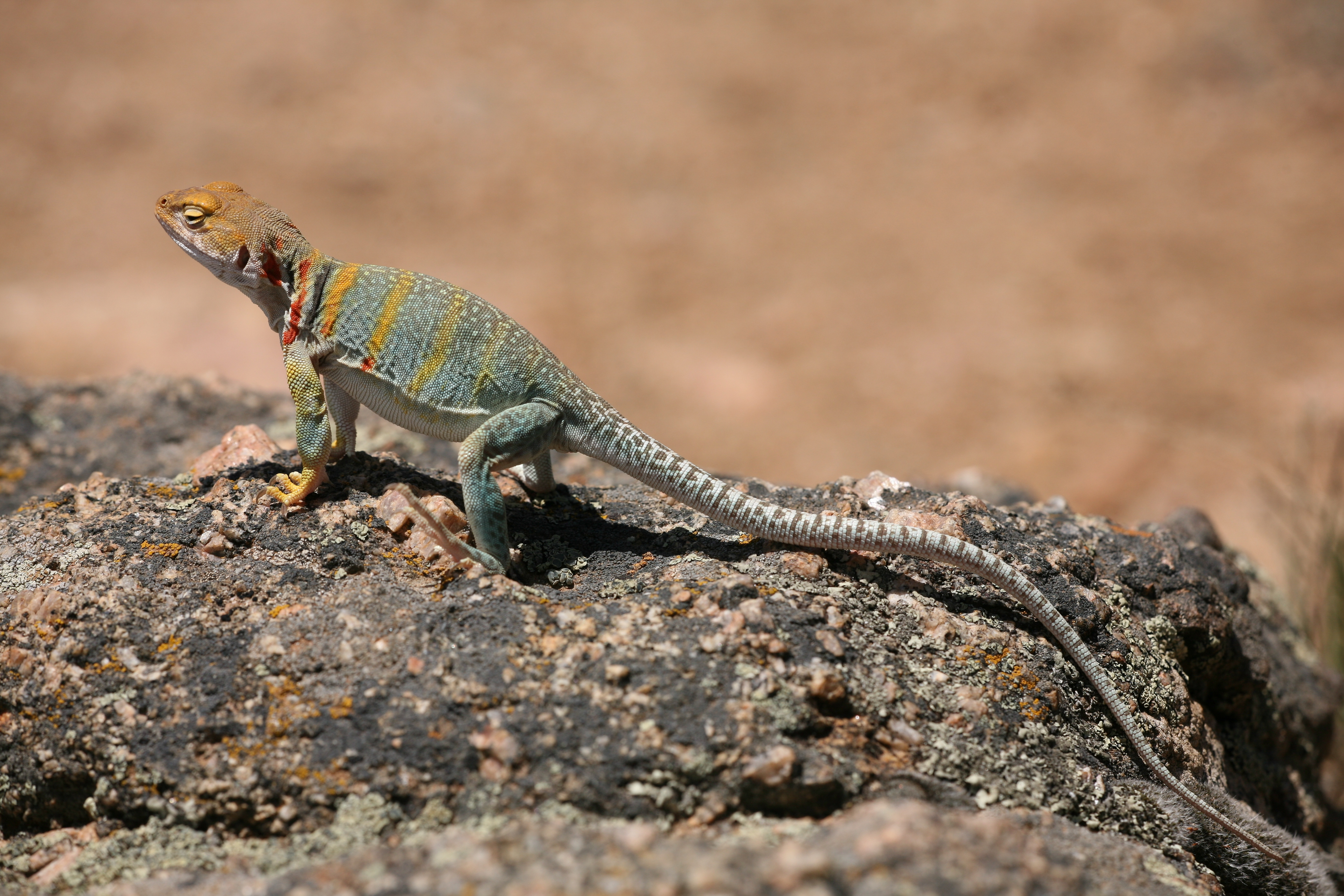
- Crotaphytus collaris

Scientific classification
- Kingdom: Animalia
- Phylum: Chordata
- Class: Reptilia
- Order: Squamata
- Suborder: Iguania
- Infraorder: Pleurodonta
- Family: Crotaphytidae; H.M. Smith & Brodie, 1982

Genera
- Crotaphytus; Gambelia

= Crotaphytidae =

Family of lizards

The Crotaphytidae, or collared lizards, are a family of desert-dwelling reptiles native to the Southwestern United States and northern Mexico. Alternatively they are recognized as a subfamily, Crotaphytinae, within the clade Pleurodonta. They are very fast-moving animals, with long limbs and tails; some species are capable of achieving bipedal running at top speed. This species is carnivorous, feeding mainly on insects and smaller lizards. The two genera contain 12 species.

They may be related to the extinct Arretosauridae of Paleogene Asia due to similar jaw morphologies, though other studies classify the Arretosauridae in Acrodonta with other Old World iguanians.

== Technical characters ==
- Femoral pores present
- Interparietal scale small (distinctly smaller than ear opening)
- Never have an enlarged middorsal scale row or fringe
- Never have a divided rostral scale
- No bony spines or projecting ridges on their heads
- No scales projecting over their ears, and no scales forming a prominent fringe on sides of toes as in Phrynosomatidae

== Species ==
Image	Genus	Living species
	Gambelia Baird, 1859 (leopard lizards)	Gambelia Copeii – Cope's Leopard Lizard (Yarrow, 1882); Gambelia Sila – Blunt-Nosed Leopard Lizard (Stejneger, 1890); Gambelia Wislizenii – Long-Nosed Leopard Lizard (Baird & Girard, 1852)
	Crotaphytus Holbrook, 1842 (collared lizards)	Crotaphytus Antiquus – Venerable Collared Lizard Axtell & Webb, 1995; Crotaphytus Bicinctores – Great Basin Collared Lizard N.M. Smith & W.W. Tanner, 1972; Crotaphytus Collaris – Common Collared Lizard (Say, 1823); Crotaphytus Collaris Auriceps – Yellow-Headed Collared Lizard Fitch & W. Tanner, 1951; Crotaphytus Collaris Baileyi – Western Collared Lizard Stejneger, 1890; Crotaphytus Collaris Collaris – Eastern Collared Lizard (Say, 1823); Crotaphytus Collaris Fuscus – Chihuahuan Collared Lizard W. Ingram & W. Tanner, 1971; Crotaphytus Collaris Melanomaculatus – Black-Spotted Collared Lizard Axtell & Webb, 1995; Crotaphytus Dickersonae – Dickerson's Collared Lizard K.P. Schmidt, 1922; Crotaphytus Grismeri – Grismer's Collared Lizard McGuire, 1994; Crotaphytus Insularis – Eastern Collared Lizard Van Denburgh & Slevin, 1921; Crotaphytus Nebrius – Sonoran Collared Lizard Axtell & Montanucci, 1977; Crotaphytus Reticulatus – Reticulated Collared Lizard Baird, 1858; Crotaphytus Vestigium – Baja Collared Lizard N.M. Smith & W.W. Tanner, 1972

Nota bene: A binomial authority in parentheses indicates that the species was originally described in different genus.
