= Cora mud turtle =

Conservation status
- Endangered (IUCN 3.1)
- CITES Appendix I

Scientific classification
- Kingdom: Animalia
- Phylum: Chordata
- Class: Reptilia
- Order: Testudines
- Suborder: Cryptodira
- Family: Kinosternidae
- Genus: Kinosternon
- Species: K. cora

Binomial name
- Kinosternon cora Loc-Barragán et al., 2020

Species of mud turtle found in Mexico

The Cora mud turtle (Kinosternon cora) is a species of mud turtle endemic to western Mexico.

== Description ==
The Cora mud turtle is a sister species of the Vallarta mud turtle (Kinosternon vogti), with which it shares most morphological characteristics. It is distinguished from other Kinosternon species (except K. vogti) in having a reduced and weakly movable plastron, and a comparatively wider carapace. The turtle differs from K. vogti mainly in being larger, darker in colour, and having shell scutes of different shapes and dimensions.

The Cora mud turtle is found in the Mexican states of Nayarit and Sinaloa. It is named after the Cora people, a Native Mexican people who live in Nayarit.
