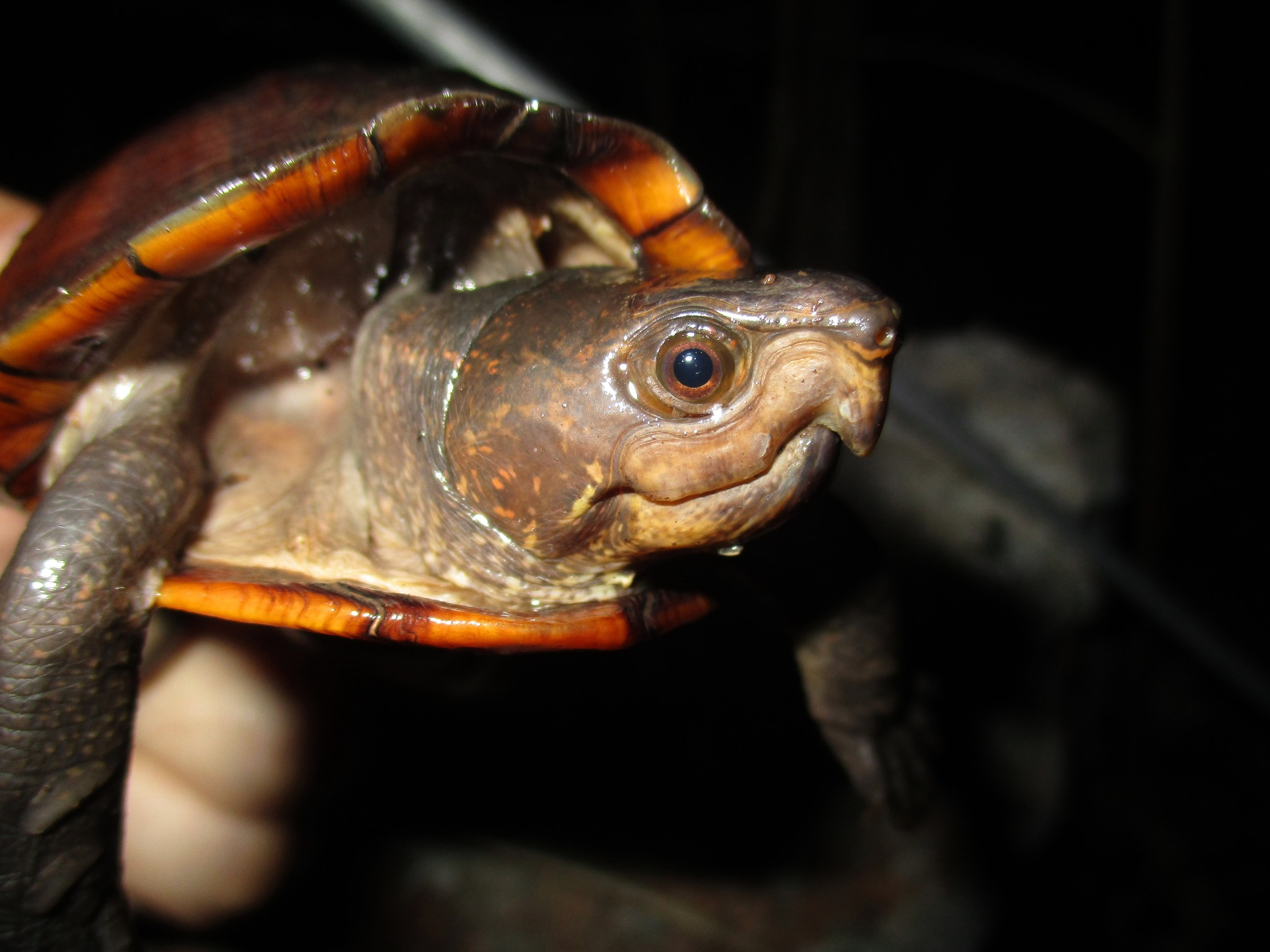
- Yucatán

Conservation status
- Near Threatened (IUCN 3.1)

Scientific classification
- Kingdom: Animalia
- Phylum: Chordata
- Class: Reptilia
- Order: Testudines
- Suborder: Cryptodira
- Family: Kinosternidae
- Genus: Kinosternon
- Species: K. creaseri

Binomial name
- Kinosternon creaseri Hartweg, 1934

= Creaser's mud turtle =

Species of turtle

Creaser's mud turtle (Kinosternon creaseri) is a species of mud turtle in the family Kinosternidae. The species is endemic to the Yucatán Peninsula in southeastern Mexico.

The specific name, creaseri, is in honor of American zoologist Edwin Phillip Creaser (1907–1981).

== Geographic range ==
K. creaseri is found in the Mexican states of Campeche, Quintana Roo, and Yucatan. A 1988 study found that the densest population occurred in Quintana Roo, as the state had been subjected to less deforestation than Campeche or Yucatán.

== Habitat ==
The preferred natural habitat of K. creaseri is small temporary pools of water in forests, shrubland, and freshwater wetlands, although they may occasionally be found in permanent pools of water as well. These temporary pools of water are generally devoid of fish.

== Description ==
The species is of average size for the genus Kinosternon. Males are slightly larger than females. The average carapace length of males is 11.5 cm, while female average carapace length is 10.7 cm. The largest male on record had a carapace length of 12.5 cm. Males can also be distinguished from females by their longer tails.

The species can be identified by its distinctive, strongly hooked beak. This is likely not an adaption for feeding, but for aggression.

Although the species can be confused with the scorpion mud turtle, Creaser's mud turtle can be distinguished from the latter by its more pungent musk and much more aggressive behaviour; while scorpion mud turtles almost always retract into their shells upon capture, both adult and hatchling Creaser's mud turtles will attempt to bite when caught. Additionally, Creaser's mud turtle has a curved (as opposed to straight) seam between the scutes of the plastral hindlobe and those of the fixed mid-portion of the plastron.

Its sister species is the Tabasco mud turtle (K. acutum), which Creaser's mud turtle can be also be confused with.

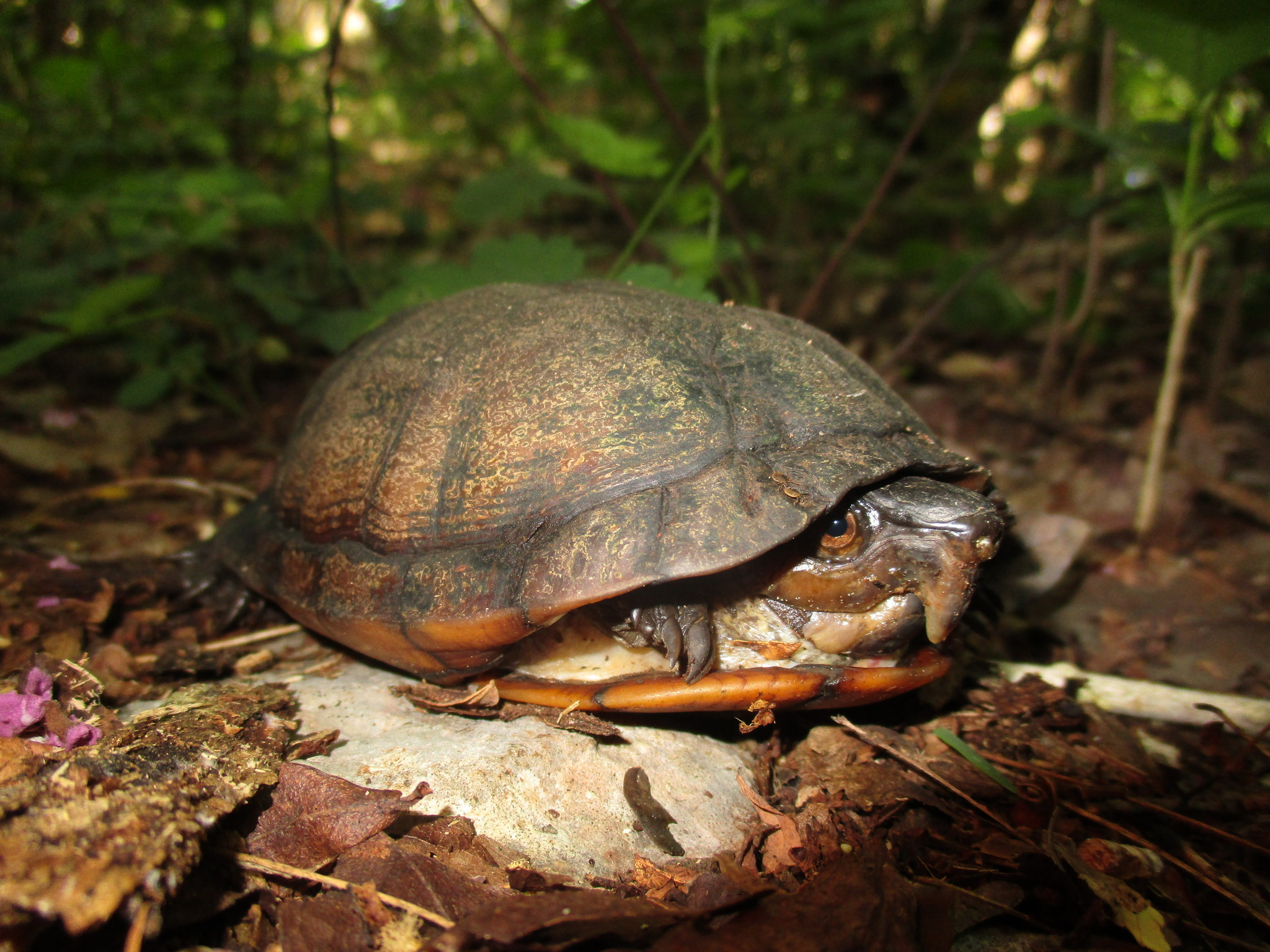
Yucatán

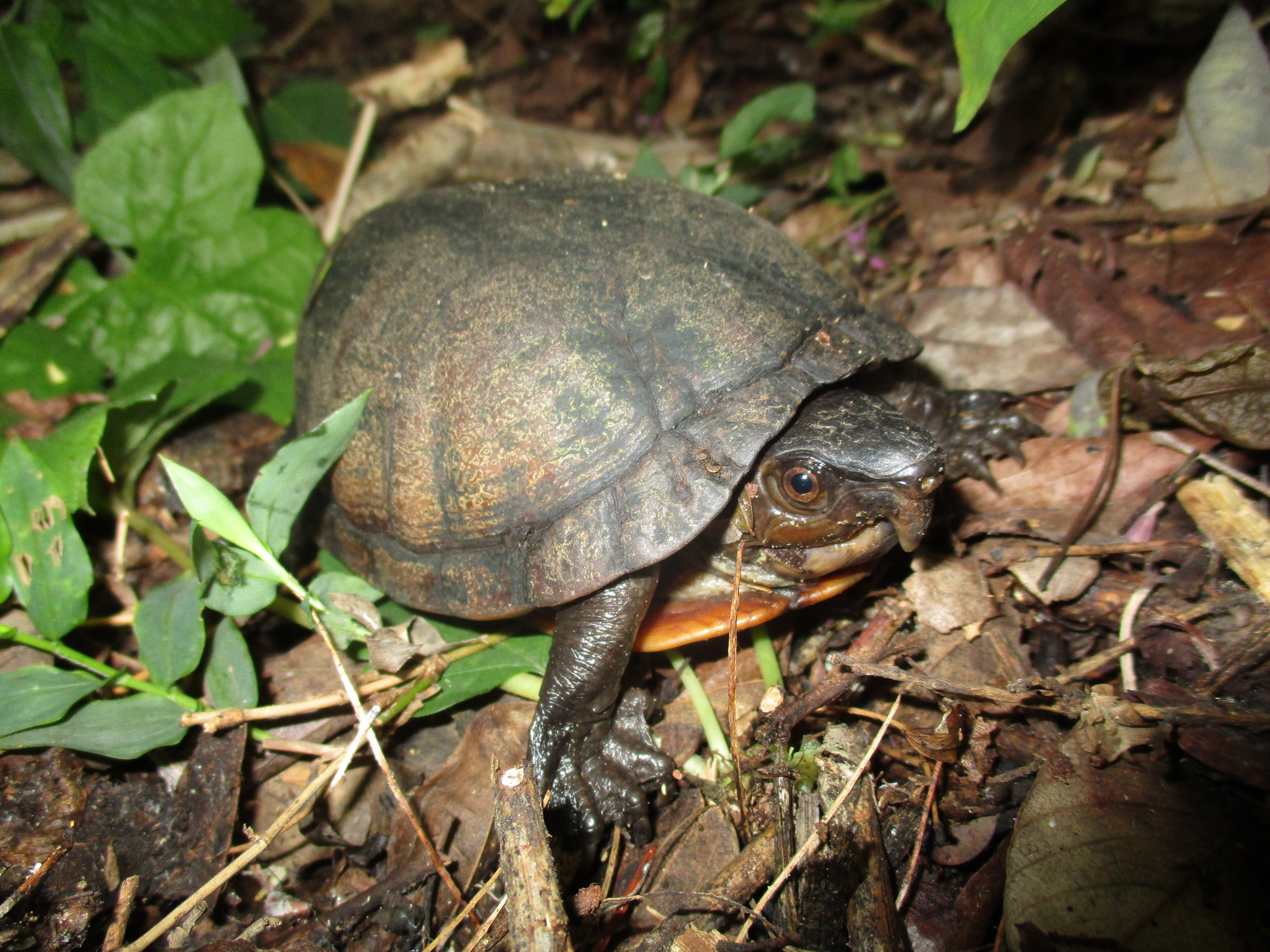
Yucatán

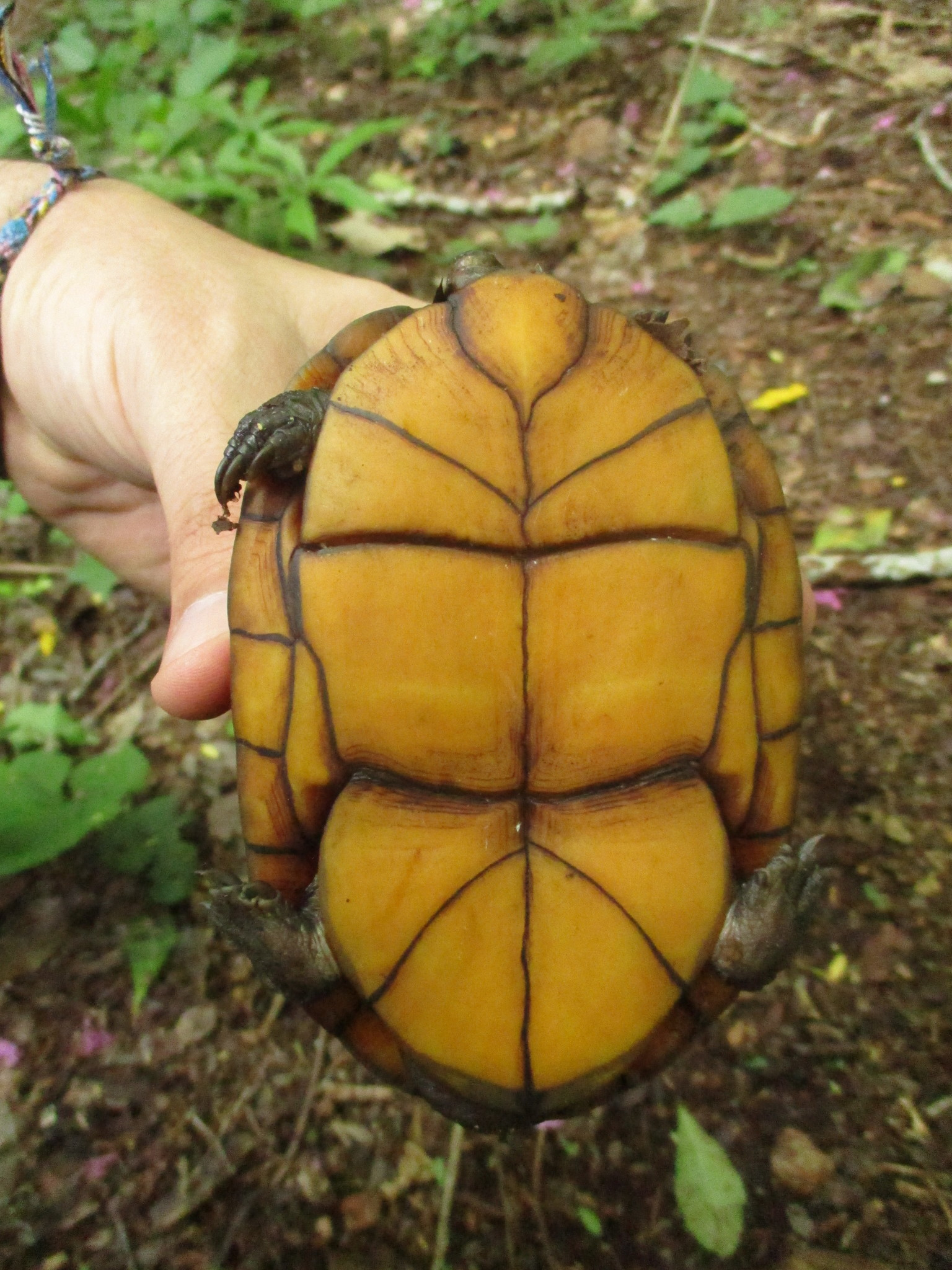
Yucatán, plastron

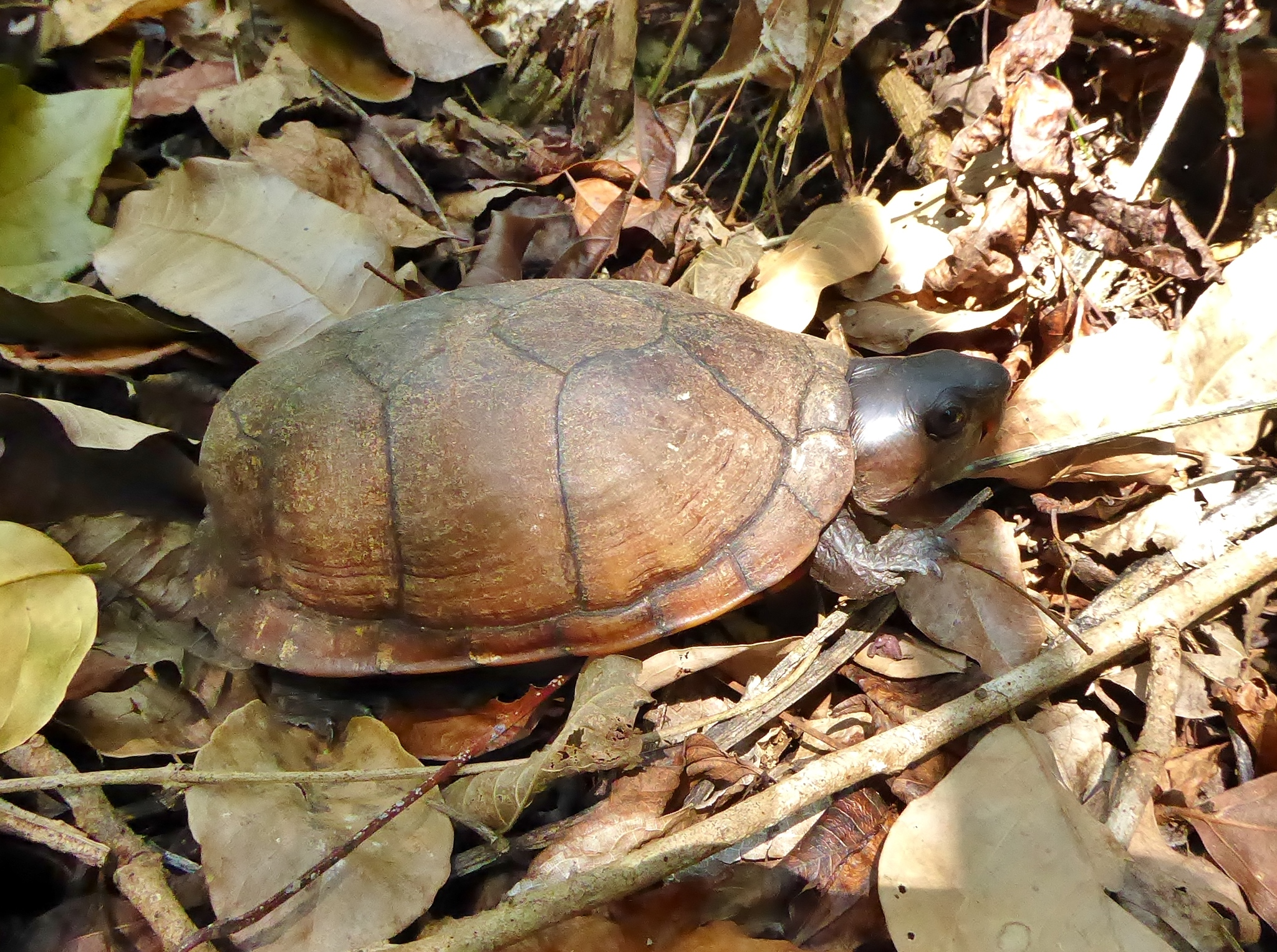
Quintana Roo

=== Geographic variation ===
There is significant geographic variation in the species. For example, Quintana Roo specimens have generally dark coloured shells, with lighter coloured heads and pale yellow necks. This is in contrast to elsewhere on the Yucatán peninsula, where shell colour is lighter and the colour of the neck and even parts of the foreleg may be brighter yellow.

Additionally, plastron morphology of Yucatán specimens differ noticeably from Campeche and Quintana Roo specimens.

== Behavior ==
K. creaseri aestivates most of the year, during which they are buried underground, and are only active during the rainy season, which occurs in June through October. Hatchlings of this species rarely bask in captivity, unlike the similar looking scorpion mud turtle, which basks frequently as hatchlings.

=== Diet ===
The species is primarily carnivorous, with observations of their feces showing they are composed mainly insect parts and snail shells, although palm seeds were also occasionally present.

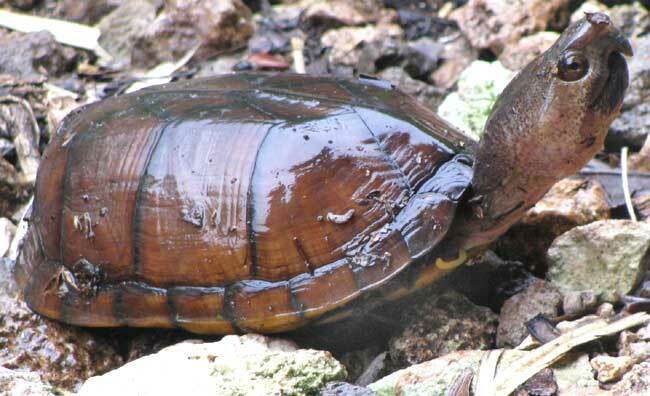
Adult, Yucatán

==== Aggression ====
The species is highly aggressive for a mud turtle, and both adults and hatchlings will viciously attempt to bite upon capture. Additionally, the strongly hooked beak that makes this species distinctive is likely not an adaptation for feeding, but for aggression. The edges of the carapace in individuals are often eroded, likely from aggressive interactions between conspecifics. Adult males are especially aggressive; if multiple turtles are placed in the same container as an adult male, bite marks soon appear on their shells. Even hatchlings will aggressively bite each other.

== Reproduction ==
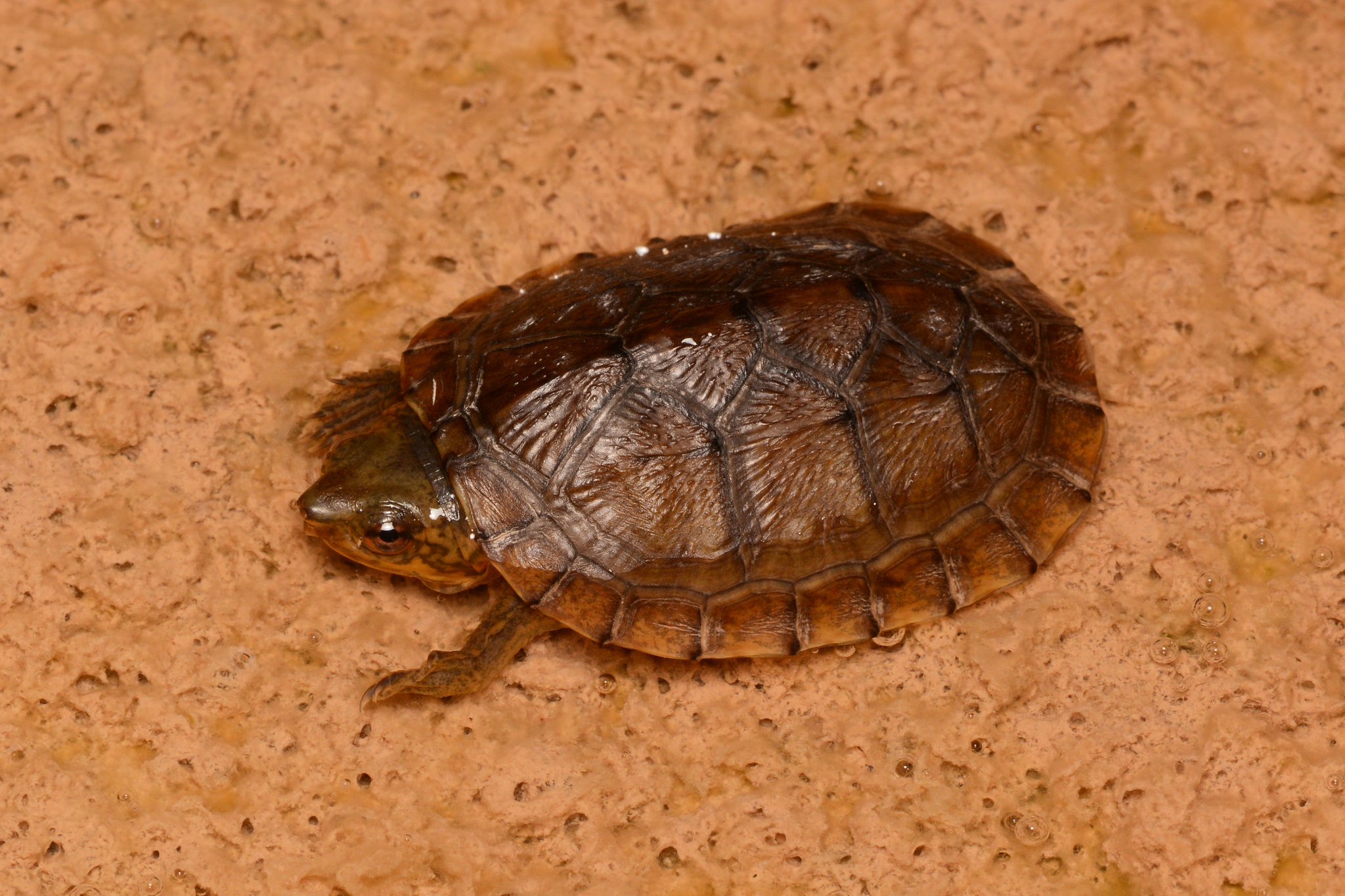
Juvenile, Yucatán

K. creaseri is oviparous. Clutch size is small, only one or two eggs, although each female lays more than one clutch per year. However, this species lays some of the largest eggs proportionate to the mother's body mass of any kinosternine species, only rivalled by Central-American, white-lipped, and Tabasco mud turtles. Sex of the hatchlings is determined by temperature.

=== Growth ===
Juveniles grow rapidly, with males likely growing faster than females by the second year. In captivity, 2 year old turtles that were caught early in their first year of life in the wild had grown to 8.4-9.3 cm (carapace length). Females reach maturity at around 10–15 years of age.

== Conservation ==
This species is threatened by deforestation (increasing evaporation thereby reducing the number of pools of water), as well as the use of wet lowland environments for agriculture.
