= Kinosternon arizonense =

Conservation status
- Extinct (prehistoric)

Scientific classification
- Domain: Eukaryota
- Kingdom: Animalia
- Phylum: Chordata
- Class: Reptilia
- Order: Testudines
- Suborder: Cryptodira
- Family: Kinosternidae
- Genus: Kinosternon
- Species: †K. arizonense

Binomial name
- †Kinosternon arizonense Gilmore, 1922

Extinct species of mud turtle

Kinosternon arizonense is an extinct species of mud turtle in the genus Kinosternon. Initially described by Charles W. Gilmore in 1922. In 2016 McCord examined available Pliocene material of K. arizonense and concluded that the fossil material differs significantly from the extant turtles. Joyce and Bourque (2016) concurred. Rhodin et al. (2017), listed Kinosternon arizonense as extinct.

== Bibliography ==
1. Gilmore (1923). "A new fossil turtle, Kinosternon arizonense, from Arizona". Proceedings of the United States National Museum. 62 (2451): 1–8. doi:10.5479/si.00963801.62-2451.1. S2CID 128991861.
