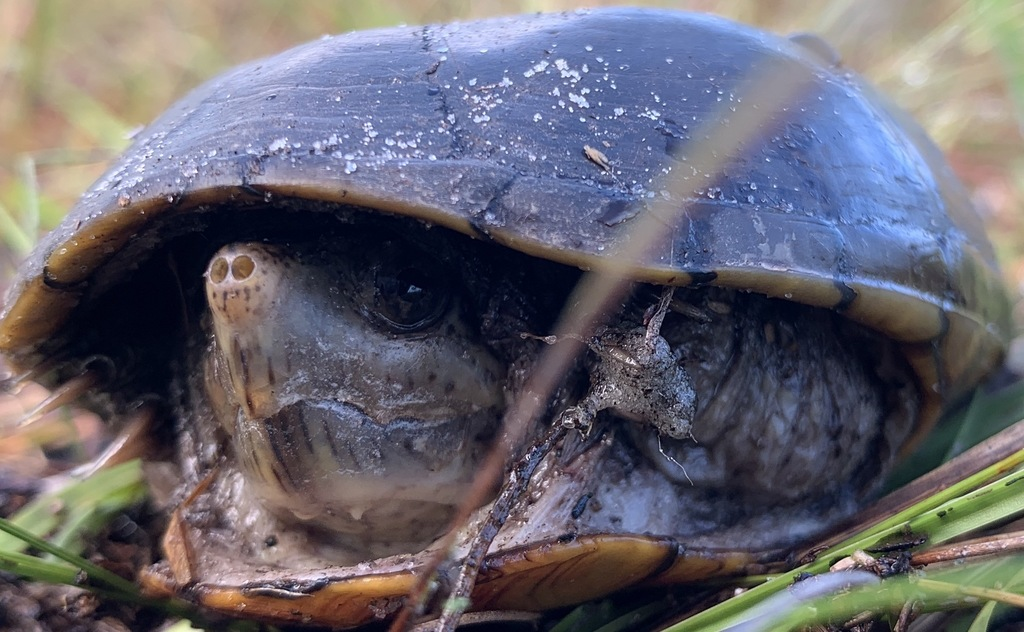

Conservation status
- Data Deficient (IUCN 3.1)

Scientific classification
- Kingdom: Animalia
- Phylum: Chordata
- Class: Reptilia
- Order: Testudines
- Suborder: Cryptodira
- Family: Kinosternidae
- Genus: Kinosternon
- Species: K. steindachneri

Binomial name
- Kinosternon steindachneri (Siebenrock, 1906)

Synonyms
- Cinosternum steindachneri Siebenrock, 1906; Kinosternon subrubrum steindachneri — Carr, 1940; Kinosternon steindachneri — Iverson et al., 2013

= Florida mud turtle =

Species of turtle

The Florida mud turtle (Kinosternon steindachneri) is a species of turtle in the family Kinosternidae. The species is endemic to the state of Florida in the United States. This species of turtle is extremely rare compared to others.

== Taxonomy ==
Although originally described as a species, K. steindachneri was long considered a subspecies of the eastern mud turtle (K. subrubum), but a 2013 analysis found there to be no data supporting this classification, and supported its recognition as its own distinct species.

== Geographic range ==
K. steindachneri is found in peninsular Florida. Its type locality is near Orlando.

== Etymology ==
The specific name, steindachneri, is in honor of Austrian herpetologist Franz Steindachner.
