= Kinosternon skullridgescens =

Kinosternon skullridgescens Temporal range: Middle Miocene

Scientific classification
- Domain: Eukaryota
- Kingdom: Animalia
- Phylum: Chordata
- Class: Reptilia
- Order: Testudines
- Suborder: Cryptodira
- Family: Kinosternidae
- Genus: Kinosternon
- Species: †K. skullridgescens

Binomial name
- †Kinosternon skullridgescens Bourque, 2012

Extinct species of reptile

Kinosternon skullridgescens is an extinct species of Kinosternon that inhabited Santa Fe County, New Mexico during the Barstovian.
