= Kinosternon pojoaque =

Kinosternon pojoaque Temporal range: Middle Miocene

Scientific classification
- Kingdom: Animalia
- Phylum: Chordata
- Class: Reptilia
- Order: Testudines
- Suborder: Cryptodira
- Family: Kinosternidae
- Genus: Kinosternon
- Species: †K. pojoaque

Binomial name
- †Kinosternon pojoaque Bourque, 2012

Extinct species of turtle

Kinosternon pojoaque is an extinct turtle in the genus Kinosternon. It existed in what is now New Mexico, United States, during the Middle Miocene period. It was described by Jason R. Bourque in 2012.

The type specimen was originally discovered by Galusha and Blick in the Pojoaque Member of the Tesuque Formation.
