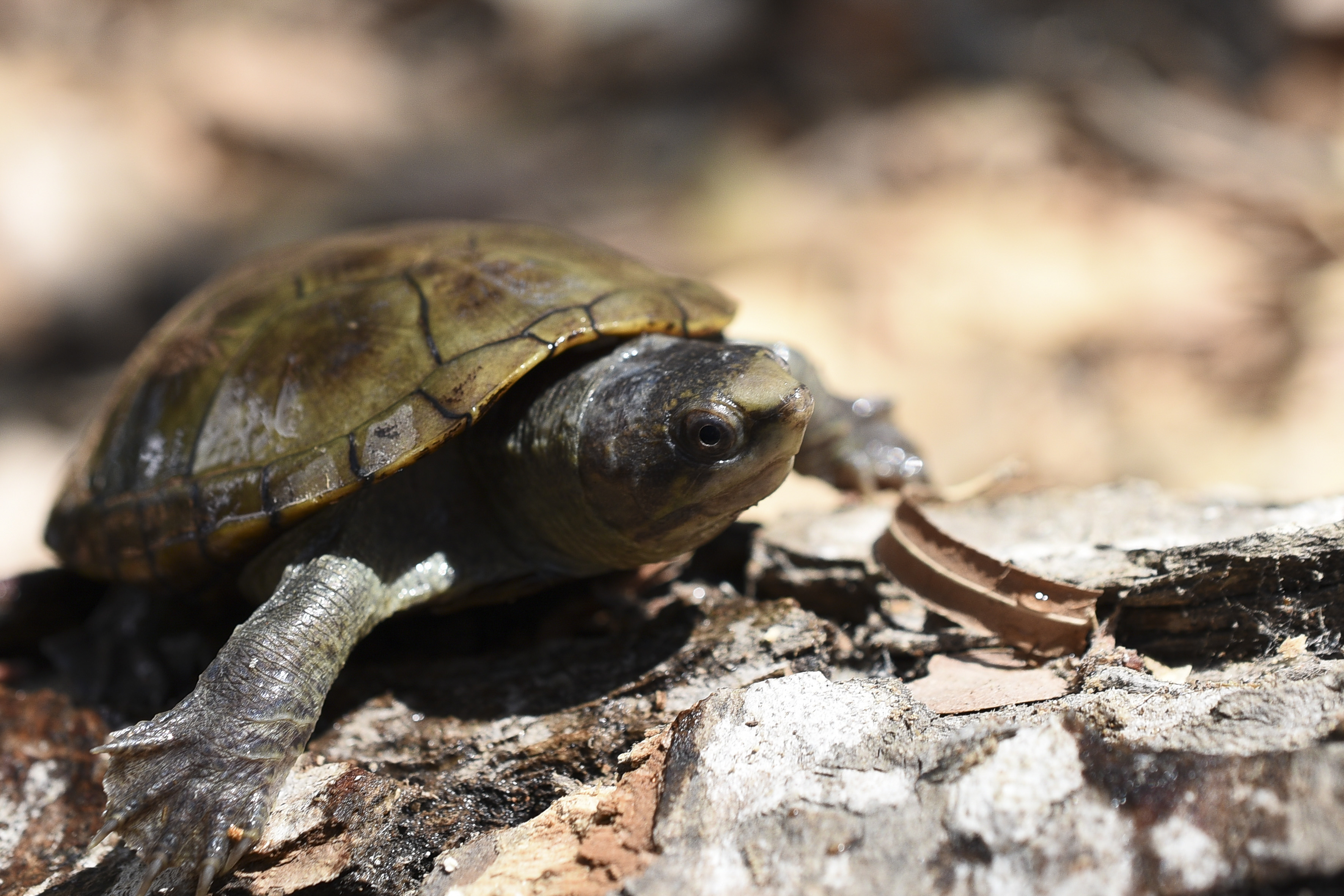

Conservation status
- CITES Appendix I

Scientific classification
- Kingdom: Animalia
- Phylum: Chordata
- Class: Reptilia
- Order: Testudines
- Suborder: Cryptodira
- Family: Kinosternidae
- Genus: Kinosternon
- Species: K. vogti

Binomial name
- Kinosternon vogti López-Luna, 2018

= Vallarta mud turtle =

Species of turtle

The Vallarta mud turtle (Kinosternon vogti) is a recently identified species of mud turtle in the family Kinosternidae. While formerly considered conspecific with the Jalisco mud turtle, further studies indicated that it was a separate species. It can be identified by a combination of the number of plastron and carapace scutes, body size, and the distinctive yellow rostral shield in males.

It is endemic to Mexican state of Jalisco. It is only known from a few human-created or human-affected habitats (such as small streams and ponds) found around Puerto Vallarta. It is one of only 3 species in Kinosternon known to inhabit the lowlands of the Central Pacific region in Mexico. Natural populations are not currently known, and the current habitats the species is known from have all been damaged by urban growth. Only one female was found during the study of the species. This makes it possibly one of the most threatened freshwater turtle species. In February of 2023, Turtle Island in Graz, Austria successfully hatched the first ever Vallarta Mud Turtles born in human care. At the time of writing, nothing is known about their diet, nesting areas, mating behaviour etc.

It is the smallest of all freshwater turtles and possibly extant turtles in general, as the collected specimens do not exceed 10.2 centimeters.
