= Dunn's mud turtle =

Conservation status
- Endangered (IUCN 3.1)

Scientific classification
- Kingdom: Animalia
- Phylum: Chordata
- Class: Reptilia
- Order: Testudines
- Suborder: Cryptodira
- Family: Kinosternidae
- Genus: Kinosternon
- Species: K. dunni

Binomial name
- Kinosternon dunni Schmidt, 1947

Species of turtle

Dunn's mud turtle (Kinosternon dunni), also known commonly as the Colombian mud turtle, is a species of turtle in the family Kinosternidae.

== Etymology ==
The epithet or specific name, dunni, honors Emmett Reid Dunn, an American herpetologist.

== Geographic range ==
K. dunni is endemic to western Colombia.

== Habitat ==
The preferred natural habitat of K. dunni is freshwater swamps and slow rivers.
