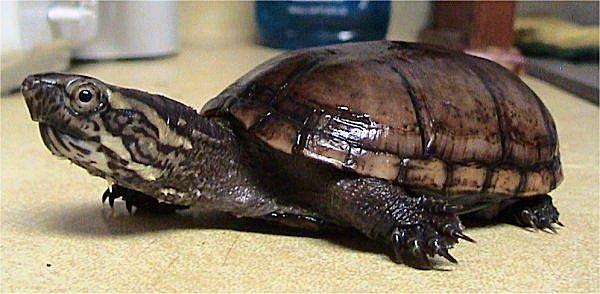
- Mississippi mud turtle Kinosternon subrubrum hippocrepis

Scientific classification
- Kingdom: Animalia
- Phylum: Chordata
- Class: Reptilia
- Order: Testudines
- Suborder: Cryptodira
- Superfamily: Kinosternoidea
- Family: Kinosternidae
- Subfamily: Kinosterninae
- Genus: Kinosternon; Spix, 1824

= Kinosternon =

Genus of turtles

Kinosternon is a genus of small aquatic turtles from the Americas known commonly as mud turtles.

== Geographic range ==
They are found in the United States, Mexico, Central America, and South America. The greatest species richness is in Mexico, and only three species (K. dunni, K. leucostomum, and K. scorpioides) are found in South America.

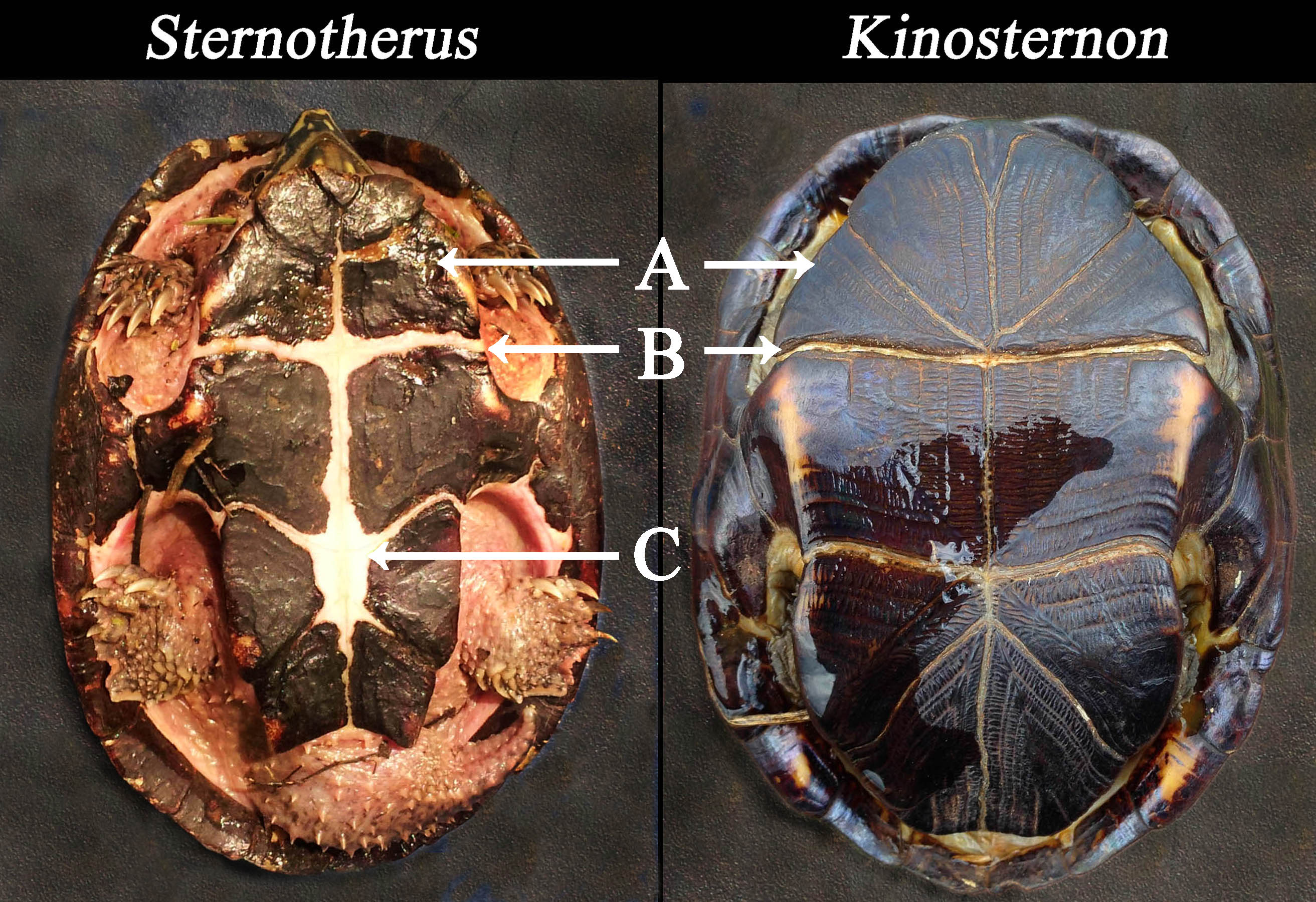
Comparison between the plastrons of Sternotherus and Kinosternon

== Description ==
They are very similar to the musk turtles, but generally smaller in size, and their carapaces are not as highly domed.

== Diet ==
All mud turtles are carnivorous, consuming various aquatic invertebrates (especially molluscs and worms), fish, and even carrion.

== Behavior ==
Mud turtles live in the ground layer on the bed of bodies of slowly-flowing or still water. By burrowing deeply into mud, mud turtles are protected from danger. They occasionally like to bask in the sun.

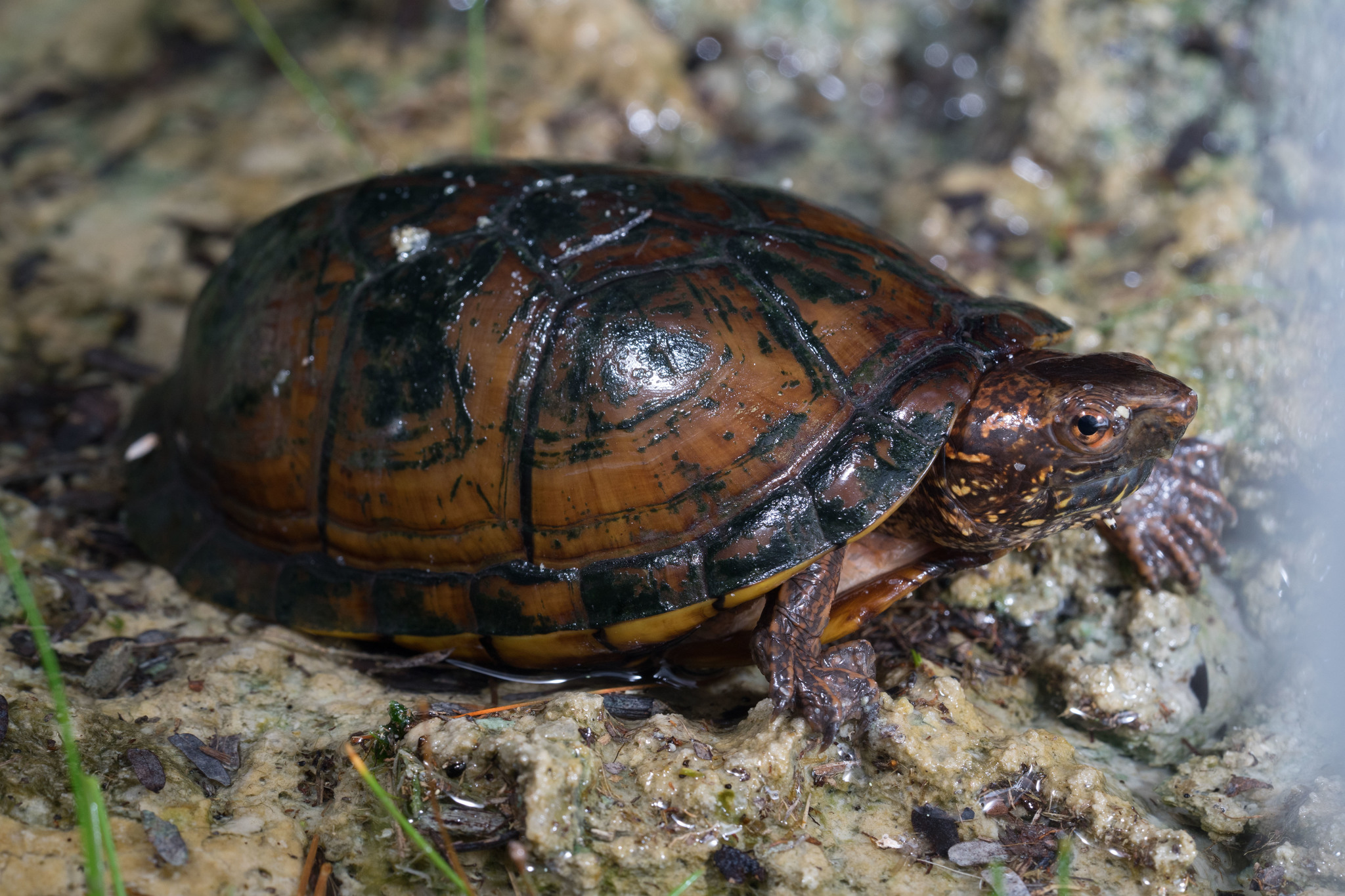
Tabasco mud turtle - K. acutum

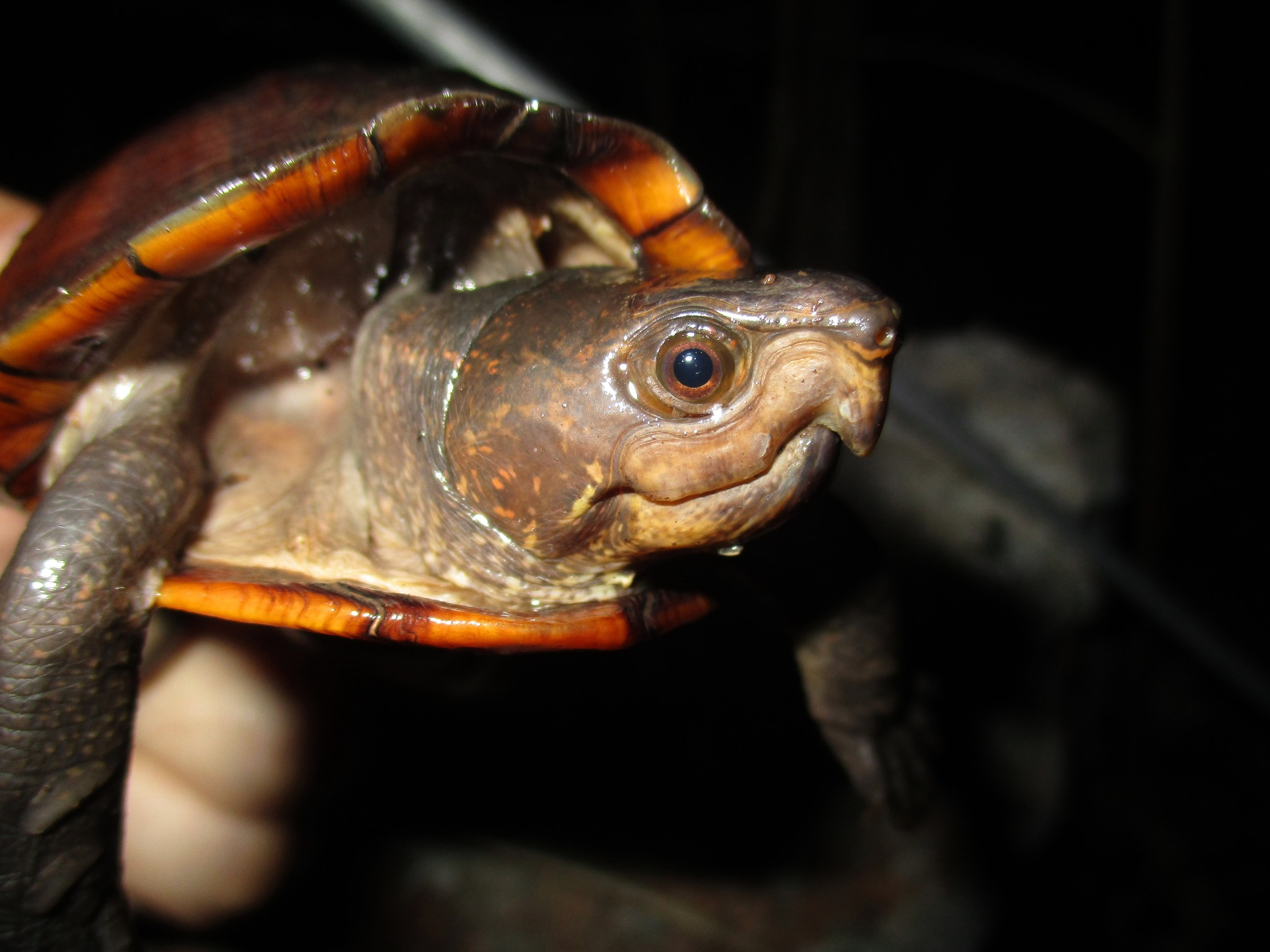
Creaser's mud turtle - K. creaseri

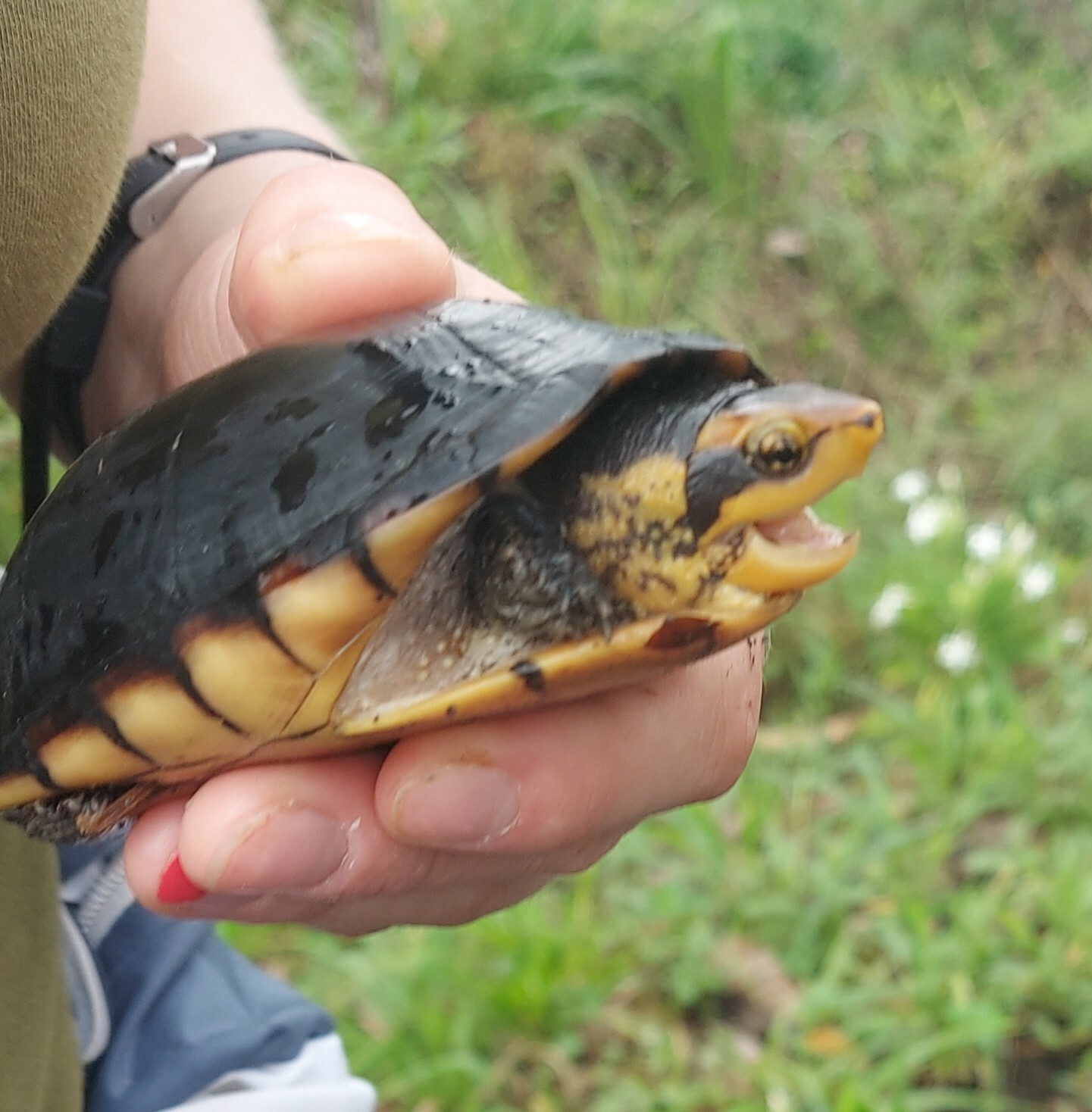
White-lipped mud turtle - K. leucostomum

== Species ==
=== Extant ===
- Central Chiapas mud turtle - K. abaxillare (Baur, 1925)
- Tabasco mud turtle - K. acutum Gray, 1831
- Alamos mud turtle - K. alamosae Berry & Legler, 1980
- Central American mud turtle - K. angustipons Legler, 1965
- Striped mud turtle - K. baurii (Garman, 1891)
- Jalisco mud turtle - K. chimalhuaca Berry, Seidel, & Iverson, 1996
- Cora mud turtle - K. cora Loc-Barragán et al., 2020
- Creaser's mud turtle - K. creaseri Hartweg, 1934
- Dunn's mud turtle - K. dunni Schmidt, 1947
- Durango mud turtle - K. durangoense Iverson, 1979
- Yellow mud turtle - K. flavescens (Agassiz, 1857)
- Herrera's mud turtle - K. herrerai Stejneger, 1925
- Rough-footed mud turtle - K. hirtipes (Wagler, 1830)
  - Valley of Mexico mud turtle - K. h. hirtipes (Wagler, 1830)
  - Lake Chapala mud turtle - K. h. chapalaense Iverson, 1981
  - San Juanico mud turtle - K. h. magdalense Iverson, 1981
  - Viesca mud turtle - K. h. megacephalum Iverson, 1981 (extinct)
  - Mexican plateau mud turtle - K. h. murrayi Glass and Hartweg, 1951
  - Patzcuarco mud turtle - K. h. tarascense Iverson, 1981
- Mexican mud turtle - K. integrum (LeConte, 1954)
- White-lipped mud turtle - K. leucostomum A.M.C. Duméril, Bibron & A.H.A. Duméril, 1851
  - Northern white-lipped mud turtle - K. l. leucostomum A.M.C. Duméril, Bibron & A.H.A. Duméril, 1851
  - Southern white-lipped mud turtle - K. l. postinguinale (Cope, 1887)
- Pacific red-cheeked mud turtle - K. mexicanum Iverson & Berry, 2024
- Oaxaca mud turtle - K. oaxacae Berry & Iverson, 1980
- Scorpion mud turtle - K. scorpioides (Linnaeus, 1766)
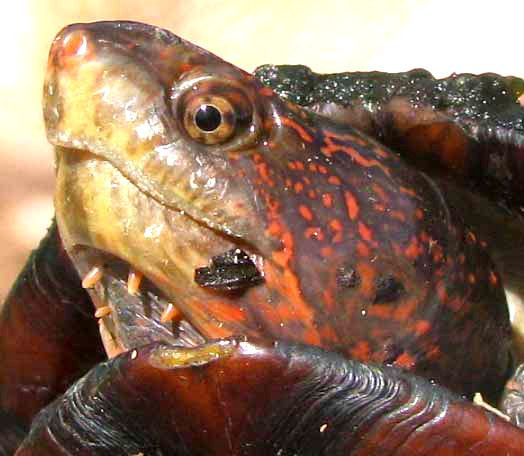
  - Red-cheeked mud turtle - K. scorpioides cruentatum
    Scorpion mud turtle (subspecies) - K. s. scorpioides (Linnaeus, 1766)
  - White-throated mud turtle - K. s. albogulare (A.H.A. Duméril and Bocourt, 1870)
  - Red-cheeked mud turtle - K. s. cruentatum (A.M.C. Duméril, Bibron & A.H.A. Duméril, 1851)
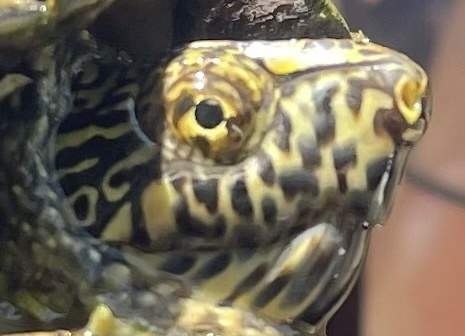
- Sonora mud turtle - K. sonoriense
  Sonora mud turtle - K. sonoriense (Le Conte, 1854)
  - Sonora mud turtle (subspecies) - K. s. sonoriense (Le Conte, 1854)
  - Sonoyta mud turtle - K. s. longifemorale (Iverson, 1981)
- Florida mud turtle - K. steindachneri (Siebenrock, 1906)
- Arizona mud turtle - K. stejnegeri Gilmore, 1923
- Eastern mud turtle - K. subrubrum (Bonnaterre, 1789)
  - Eastern mud turtle (subspecies) - K. s. subrubrum (Bonnaterre, 1789)
  - Mississippi mud turtle - K. s. hippocrepis (Bonnaterre, 1789)
- Vallarta mud turtle - K. vogti López-Luna et al., 2018

=== Extinct ===
- †Kinosternon arizonense Gilmore, 1923 (known from Plio-Pleistocene fossil remains, formerly considered conspecific with K. stejnegeri)
- †Kinosternon notolophus Bourque, 2016
- †Kinosternon pannekollops Bourque, 2016
- †Kinosternon pojoaque
- †Kinosternon rincon Bourque, 2016
- †Kinosternon skullridgescens
- †Kinosternon wakeeniense Bourque, 2016
