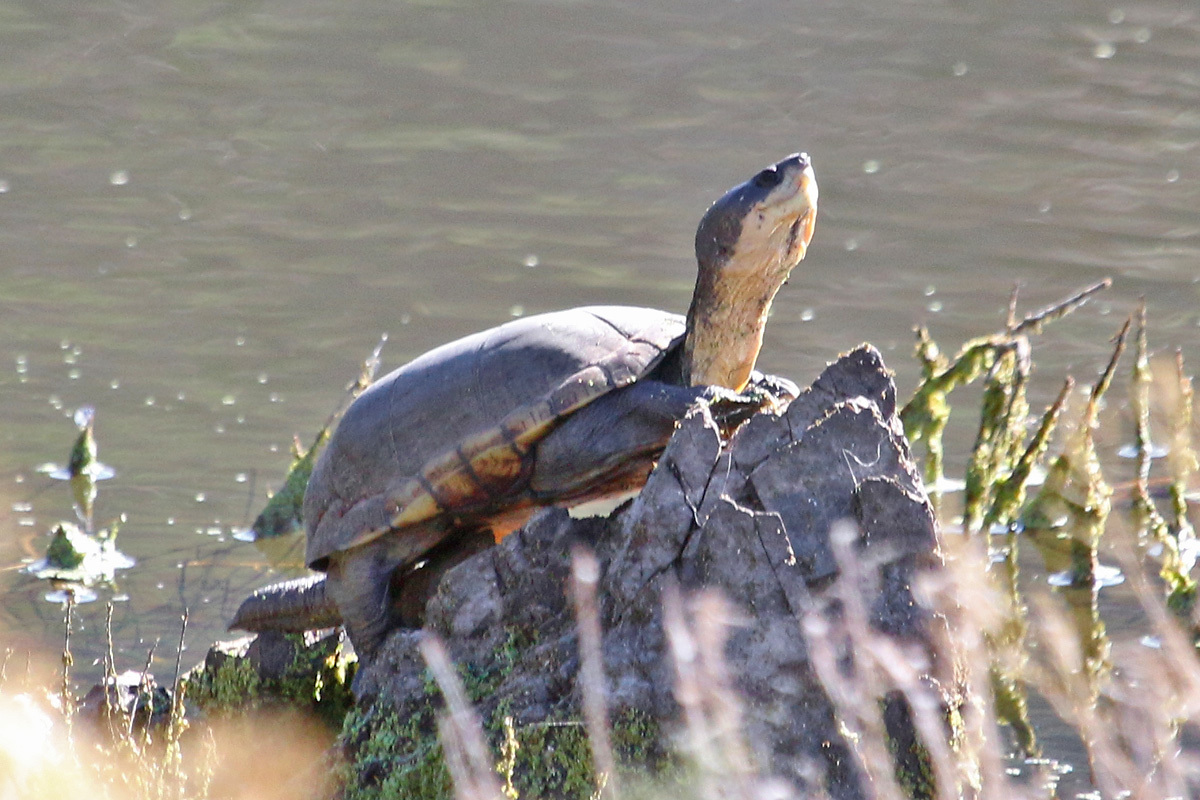

Conservation status
- Near Threatened (IUCN 3.1)

Scientific classification
- Kingdom: Animalia
- Phylum: Chordata
- Class: Reptilia
- Order: Testudines
- Suborder: Cryptodira
- Family: Kinosternidae
- Genus: Kinosternon
- Species: K. stejnegeri

Binomial name
- Kinosternon stejnegeri (Gilmore, 1923)

Synonyms
- Kinosternon arizonenese Iverson, 1978 (ex errore)* Kinosternon flavescens stejnegeri Hartweg, 1938; Kinosternon flavescens arizonense Iverson, 1979

= Arizona mud turtle =

Species of turtle

The Arizona mud turtle (Kinosternon stejnegeri) is a species of mud turtle in the family Kinosternidae found in the deserts of Arizona (United States) and Sonora (Mexico). It is a semi-aquatic turtle. It lives in impermanent puddles, and avoids permanent rivers and lakes.

The male adult Arizona mud turtle is 103–181.3 mm (4.06–7.14 in) long, and the female is slightly smaller. The turtle's top shell is brown and olive brown with a dome shaped appearance. The skin is brown, dark silver on top, and light yellow on bottom of the head. There are no patterns on the extremities.

The turtle's diet includes frogs, tadpoles, invertebrates and carrion. During winter the Arizona mud turtle hibernates under the temporary puddle and pond.

The growth cycle begins in July and early August when the turtle starts laying eggs.

== Description ==
The male adult Arizona mud turtle is 103–181.3 mm (4.06–7.14 in) long, and the female is 95.5–167.3 mm (3.76–6.59 in) long. The turtle's body varies in color. The carapace (upper portion of the shell) is dome shaped and tends to be brown, olive or a yellow-brown in color. The carapace also lacks keels. The marginal shield, which can be described as the rim around the shell, is yellow, As is the lower portion of the shell, the plastron. The top of the head is grey in color, and the bottom and sides are cream and light yellow. Unlike other species of turtles, the first vertebral scute and second marginal shield do not connect.

== Habitat and behavior ==
Arizona mud turtles prefer temporary ponds and puddle because they will have a secure food source. The Arizona mud turtle is active occurs during the day. It is often found near the temporary pond to conserve heat and energy from sunlight. It also is active at night in July and August in monsoon season. Because it is warm during this period, it spends most of its time in the water, and is therefore semi-aquatic. During the winter, it hibernates in a burrow. In droughts, the Arizona mud turtle can remain dormant underground for up to two years.

=== Distribution ===
The Arizona mud turtle usually lives at elevations of 200–800 m (660–2,620 ft). It is found in the Lower Colorado River Sonoran Desert scrub, Arizona Upland Sonoran Desert scrub, and Semidesert Grassland communities.

=== Diet ===
The diet consists of anurans, dytiscid beetles, toads, tadpoles, fish, invertebrates, hydrophilid beetles and carrion.

=== Life cycle ===
The Arizona mud turtle mates primarily in July and early August, and the female lays three to seven eggs. The Arizona mud turtle usually buries its eggs close to food sources. Hatchlings are usually 25–28 mm (0.98–1.10 in) carapace length and have life span from 6 to 10 years age.

== Major threats ==
The species is considered threatened due to ranching, agriculture and flood control in the Sonoran Desert. Its wetlands habitat also exposes it to climate and habitat degradation. Road mortality is also likely to affect this species. The Arizona mud turtle benefits from pond construction performed by humans.
