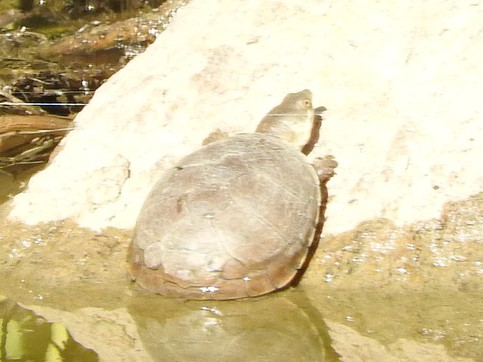

Conservation status
- Near Threatened (IUCN 3.1)

Scientific classification
- Kingdom: Animalia
- Phylum: Chordata
- Class: Reptilia
- Order: Testudines
- Suborder: Cryptodira
- Family: Kinosternidae
- Genus: Kinosternon
- Species: K. durangoense

Binomial name
- Kinosternon durangoense (Iverson, 1979)

Synonyms
- Kinosternon flavescens durangoense Iverson, 1979; Kinosternon durangoense Serb, Phillips & Iverson, 2001

= Durango mud turtle =

Species of turtle

The Durango mud turtle (Kinosternon durangoense) is a species of mud turtle in the Kinosternidae family.

It is endemic to north-eastern Mexico. It is found in the states of Chihuahua, Coahuila, and Durango.
