= Alamos mud turtle =

Conservation status
- Near Threatened (IUCN 3.1)

Scientific classification
- Kingdom: Animalia
- Phylum: Chordata
- Class: Reptilia
- Order: Testudines
- Suborder: Cryptodira
- Family: Kinosternidae
- Genus: Kinosternon
- Species: K. alamosae

Binomial name
- Kinosternon alamosae (Berry & Legler, 1980)

Synonyms
- Kinosternon alamose Pritchard, 1979; Kinosternon alamosae Berry & Legler, 1980 (nomen nudum); Kinosternon alamosae Berry & Legler, 1980; Kinosternon alamosa Rogner, 1996 (ex errore)

Species of turtle

The Alamos mud turtle (Kinosternon alamosae) is a species of mud turtle in the family Kinosternidae. It is endemic to Mexico, where it occurs in the states of Sinaloa and Sonora.

== Description ==
The Alamos mud turtles are slightly less than average in size compared to other members of the same genus. Males tend to be larger than females, with matured females having an average carapace length of 95–100 mm (3.7–3.9 in), compared to an average of 90–120 mm (3.5–4.7 in) with their male counterparts. When males are compared to females, there are a few notable differences. Males have a much narrower carapace, a shorter plastron, a shorter plastral hind lobe, narrower plastral lobes, a shorter bridge, and a shorter interanal seam.

== Habitat ==
Alamos mud turtles prefer temporary pond habitats. Examples of such include arroyos, roadside ditches, and cattle tanks. The Alamos mud turtle also has an extraordinary thermal tolerance. Researchers have found them in shallow ponds (~10 cm (3.9 in) deep) with temperatures reaching as high as 42 °C (108 °F). Some specimen are even located in ponds that are scalding to the touch.
