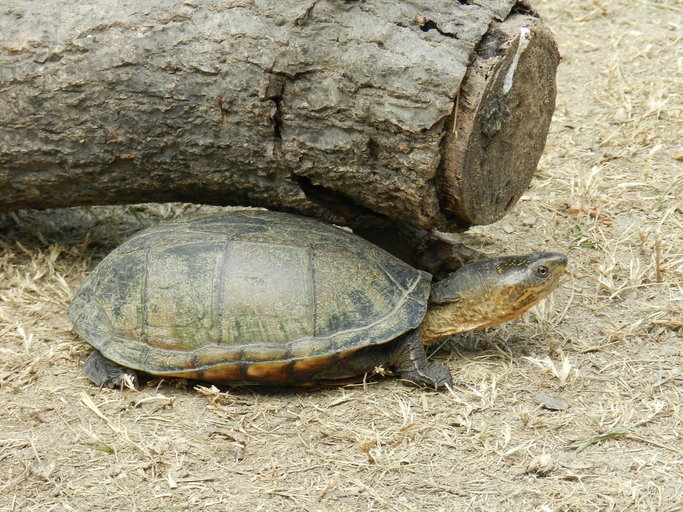

Conservation status
- Least Concern (IUCN 3.1)

Scientific classification
- Kingdom: Animalia
- Phylum: Chordata
- Class: Reptilia
- Order: Testudines
- Suborder: Cryptodira
- Family: Kinosternidae
- Genus: Kinosternon
- Species: K. oaxacae

Binomial name
- Kinosternon oaxacae Berry & Iverson, 1980

Synonyms
- Kinosternon oaxacae Pritchard, 1979; Kinosternon oaxacae Berry & Iverson, 1980 (nomen nudum); Kinosternon oaxacae Berry & Iverson, 1980

= Oaxaca mud turtle =

Species of turtle

The Oaxaca mud turtle (Kinosternon oaxacae) is a species of mud turtle in the family Kinosternidae. It is endemic to Mexico. Both the common name and the scientific name derive from Oaxaca, a Mexican state. The International Union for Conservation of Nature has assessed this species as "Least Concern".

== Description ==
The male Oaxaca mud turtle can grow to a carapace length of about 160 mm (6 in) with females a little smaller. Males reach maturity when their shell length is approximately 113–125 mm at about 7 to 10 years old, and for females, they reach maturity at approximately 115 mm shell length at about 8 to 9 years old. The carapace has three distinctive longitudinal keels and is slightly depressed, the width being about 60% of the length and 35% of the height. The colour of the carapace is dark brown or blackish, or a mottling of the two, and in pale-coloured individuals, the seams are darker. The plastron is relatively narrow, being about two-thirds the width of the carapace. It is concave in males and nearly flat in females, and is yellowish or pale brown with darker seams. There is a V-shaped or bell-shaped rostral shield. The head is dark brown or black mottled with cream; it is sometimes reticulated but is not striped. The underside of the head and throat are cream and there are three or four pairs of barbel on the chin and throat. The limbs are grey or brown above and cream below, while the tail is uniformly greyish brown.

== Distribution and habitat ==
This mud turtle is endemic to Mexico; it is found in Guerrero and Oaxaca, where it is only known from the drainage basins of the Rio Colotepec and the Rio Tonameca, at altitudes between about 100 and 800 m (300 and 2,600 ft). Its habitat is marshes, muddy pools and other still, turbid water bodies, and it occasionally occurs in rivers. It is sometimes found on the coastal plain, having apparently been washed down by rivers in spate.

== Ecology ==
The diet probably consists mostly of plant material, but small animals such as tadpoles, shrimps, beetles and fish are also eaten. The species can be considered an opportunistic feeder, since it eats both plant material and small animals, which is different from other Kinosternon species. These turtles are most active in the rainy season which lasts from June to October. Breeding probably takes place in July with the eggs hatching after the rains cease. The young are slow-growing and it takes between seven and ten years for them to reach maturity.
