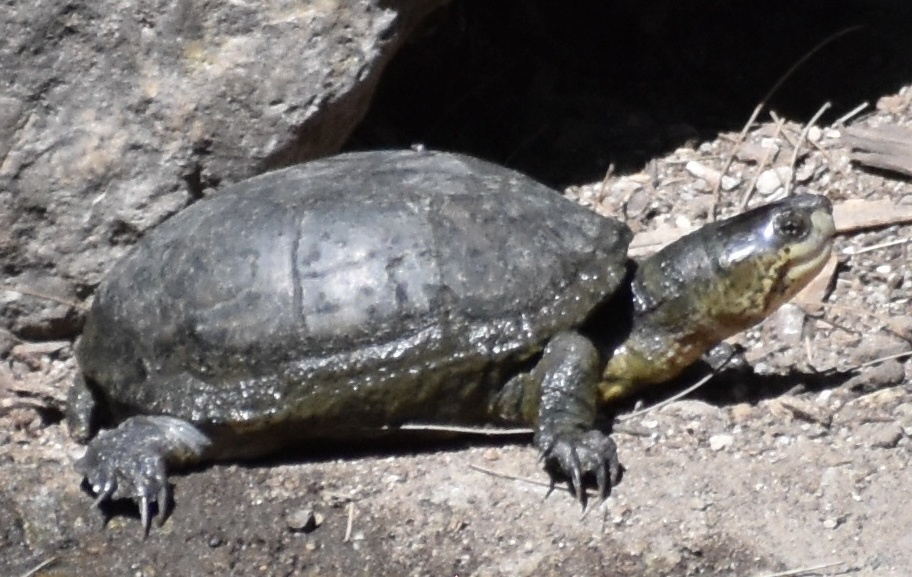
- In Jalisco

Conservation status
- Least Concern (IUCN 3.1)

Scientific classification
- Kingdom: Animalia
- Phylum: Chordata
- Class: Reptilia
- Order: Testudines
- Suborder: Cryptodira
- Family: Kinosternidae
- Genus: Kinosternon
- Species: K. integrum

Binomial name
- Kinosternon integrum (Le Conte, 1854)

Synonyms
- List: Kinosternum integrum LeConte, 1854; Cinosternum integrum Agassiz, 1857; Thyrosternum integrum Agassiz, 1857; Thyrosternon integrum Gray, 1858; Cinosternon integrum Strauch, 1862; Kinosternon integrum Müller, 1865; Swanka integra Gray, 1870; Cinosternon rostellum Bocourt, 1876; Cinosternon guanajuatense Dugès, 1888; Cinosternum rostellum Boulenger, 1889; Cinosternum scorpioides integrum Siebenrock, 1904; Kinosternon scorpioides integrum Ahl, 1934; Kinosternon intergrum Dixon, 1960 (ex errore); Cinosetum integrum Gillet, 1995; Kinosternon ingegrum Rogner, 1996 (ex errore)

= Mexican mud turtle =

Species of turtle

The Mexican mud turtle (Kinosternon integrum), is a species of mud turtle in the family Kinosternidae. Endemic to Mexico, they inhabit moist environments, such as shallow ponds, lakes, rivers or intermediate temp. tropical forest areas.

== Distribution ==
In Mexico, it is found in Aguascalientes, Colima, Durango, Guanajuato, Guerrero, Hidalgo, Jalisco, Michoacán, México, Morelos, Nayarit, Oaxaca, Puebla, Queretaro, San Luis Potosí, Sinaloa, Sonora, Tamaulipas and Zacatecas.

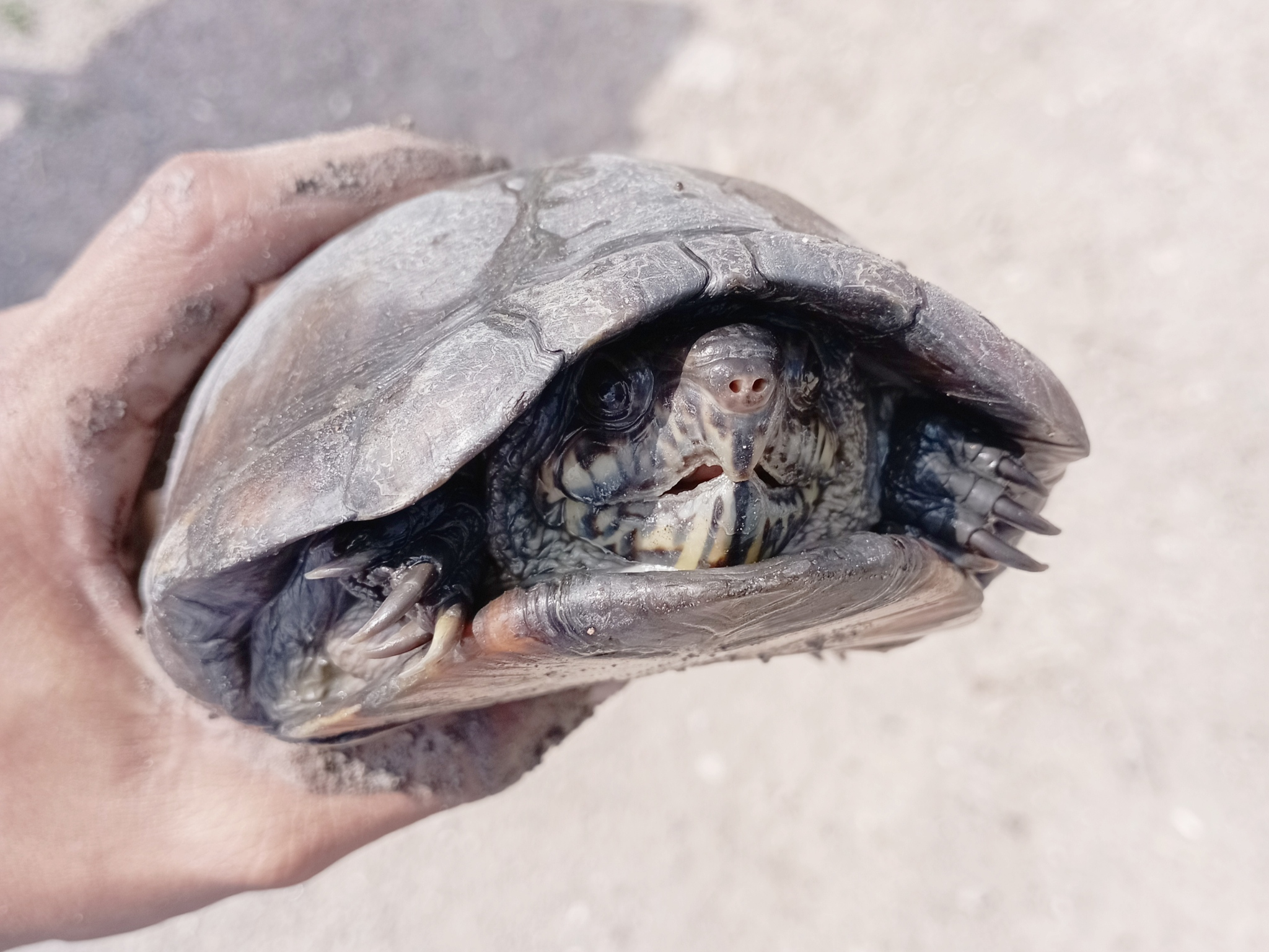
Guanajuato

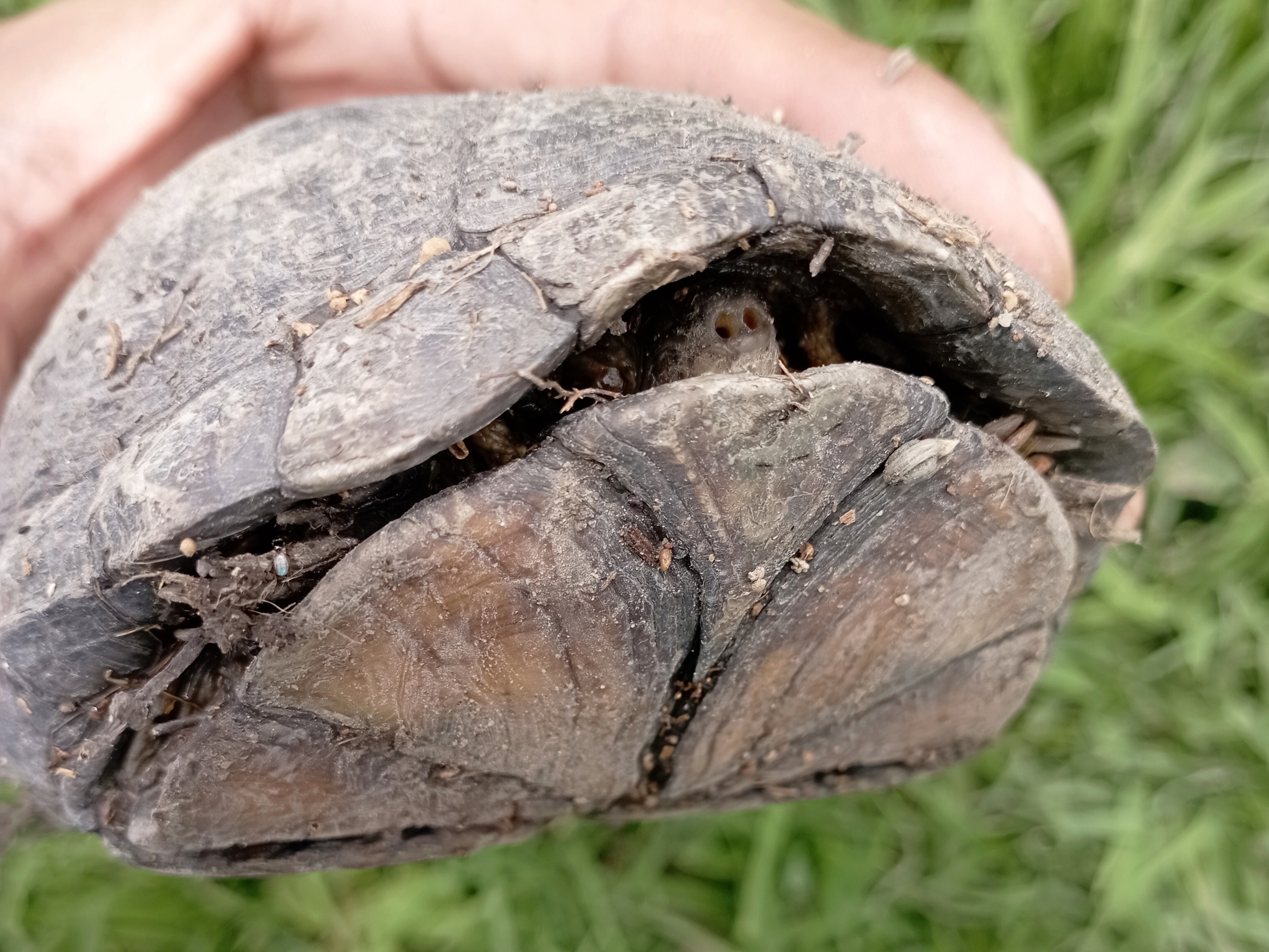
Guanajuato

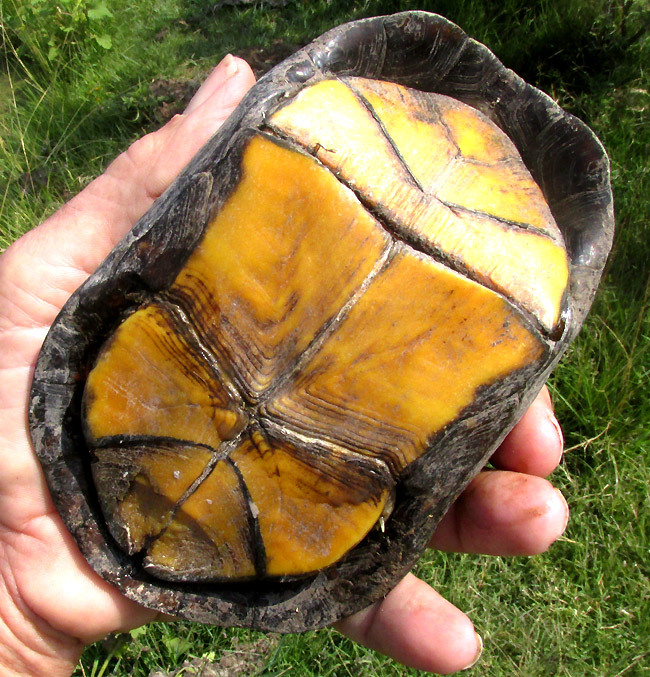
Querétaro

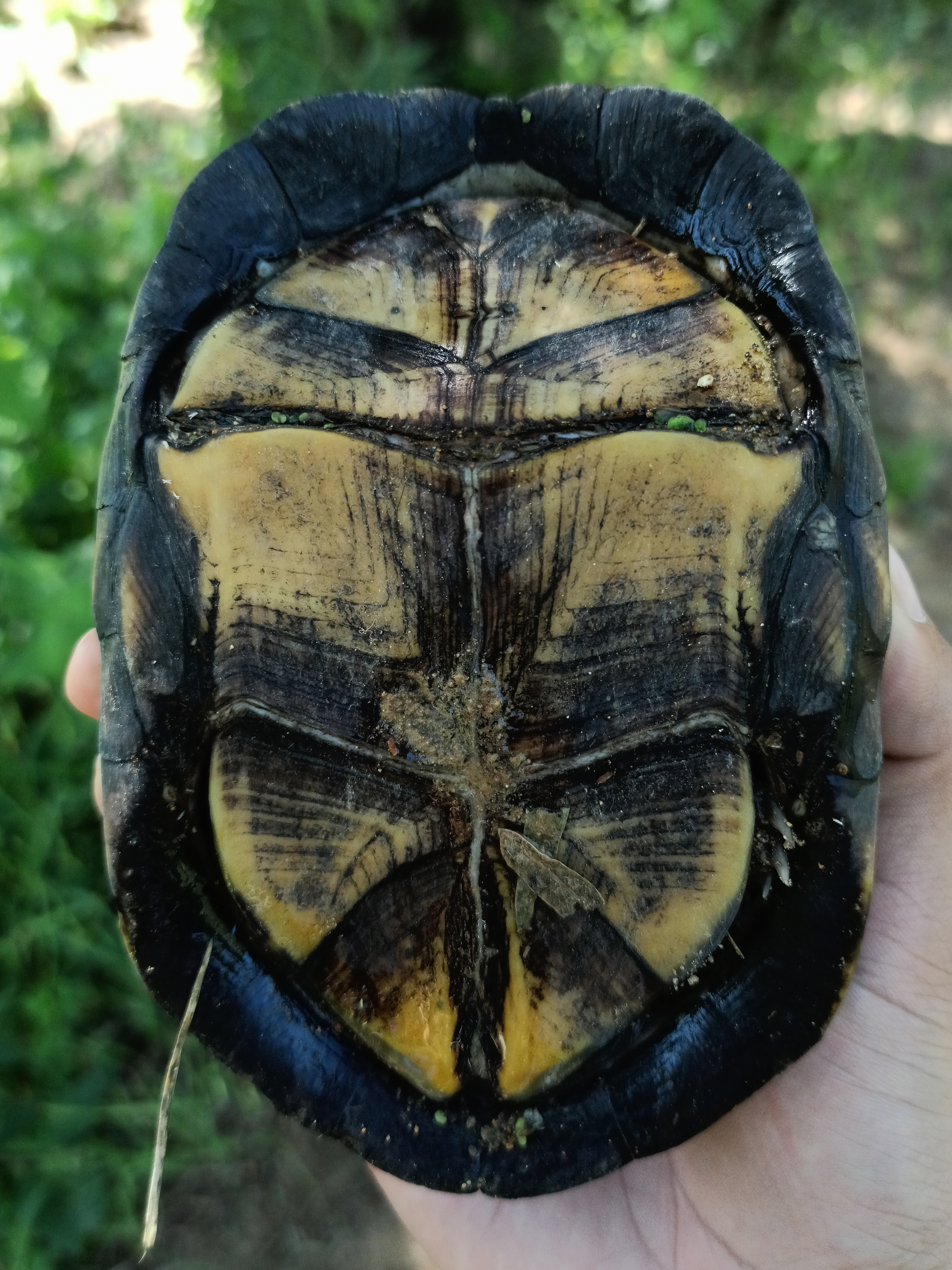
Guanajuato

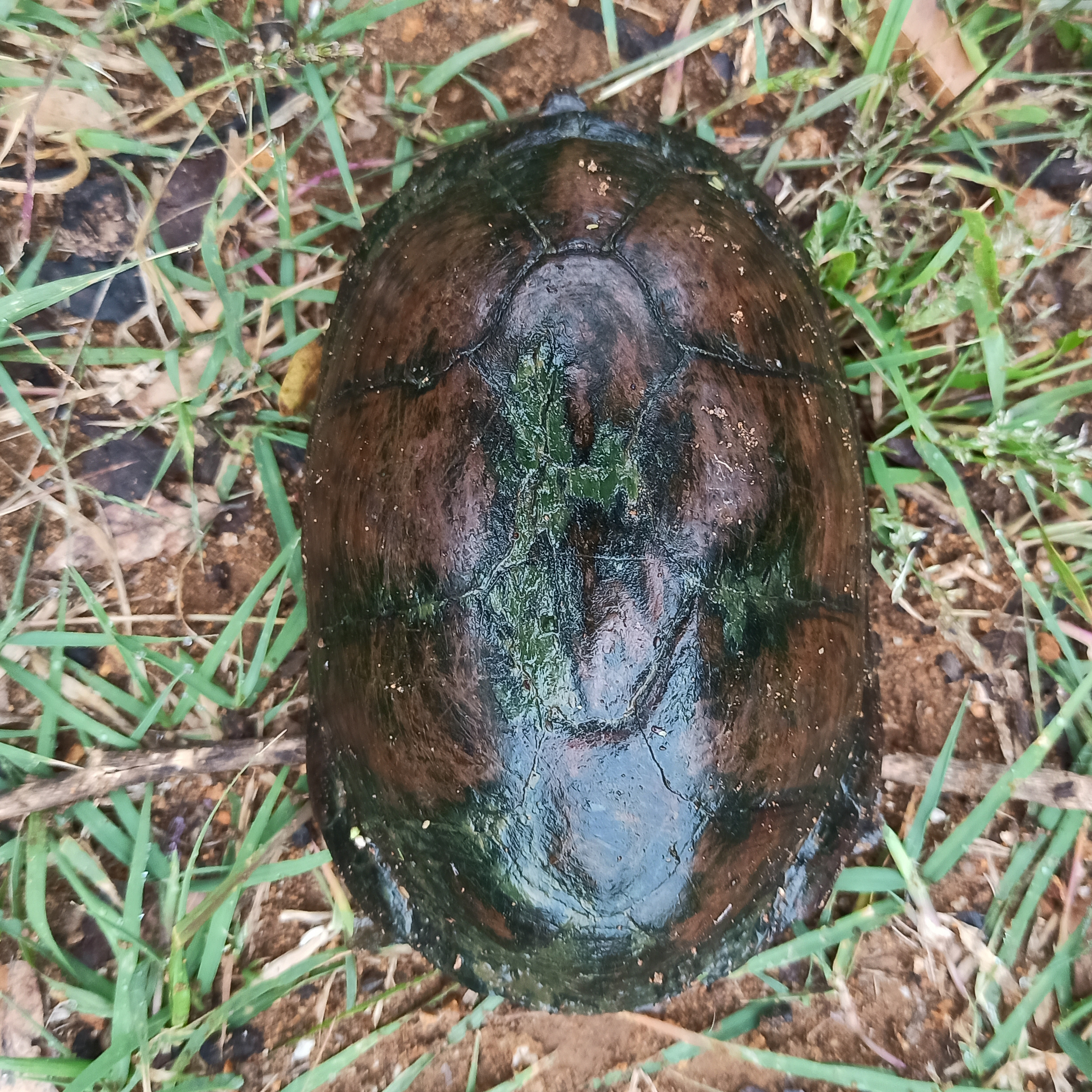
Guanajuato

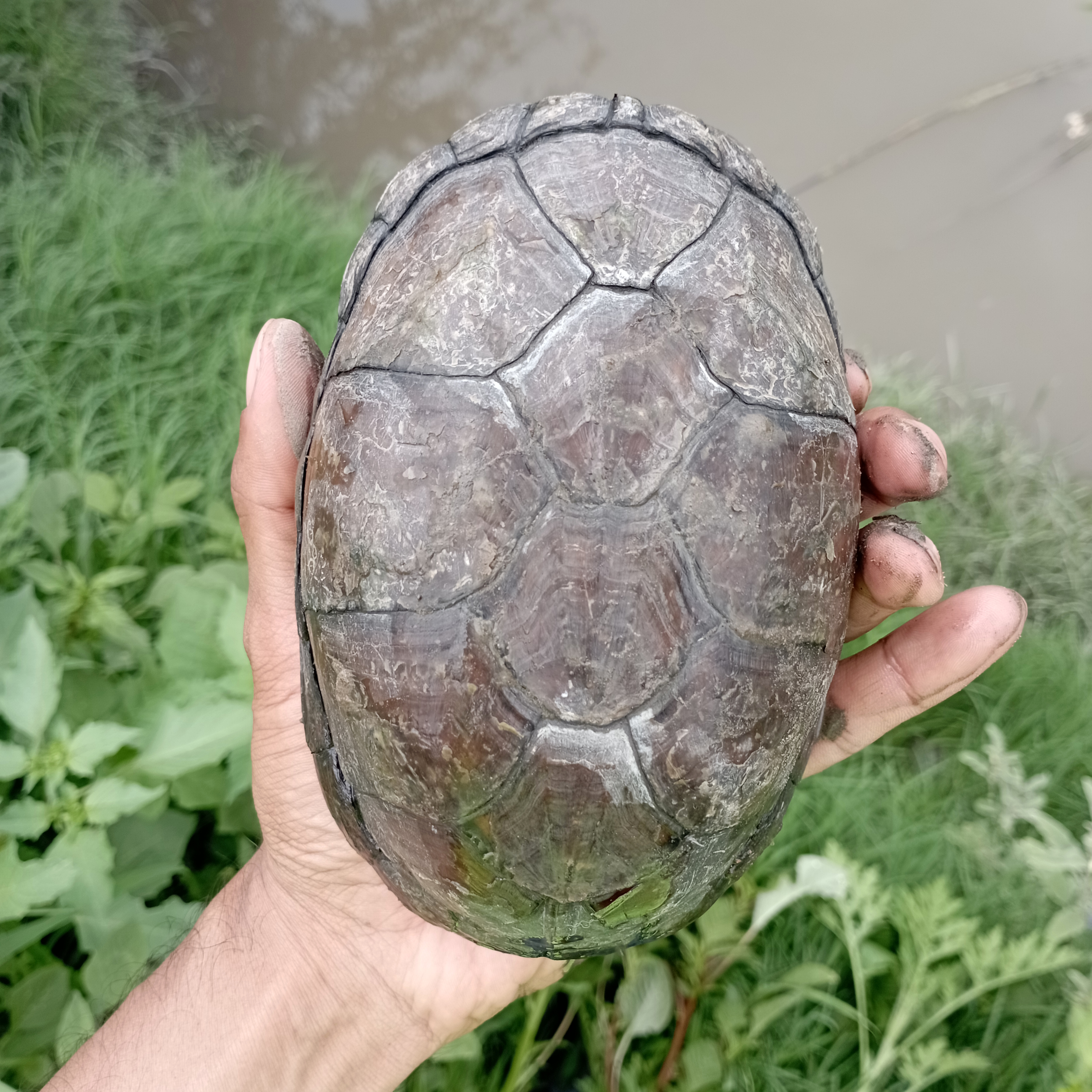
Guanajuato

== Reproduction ==
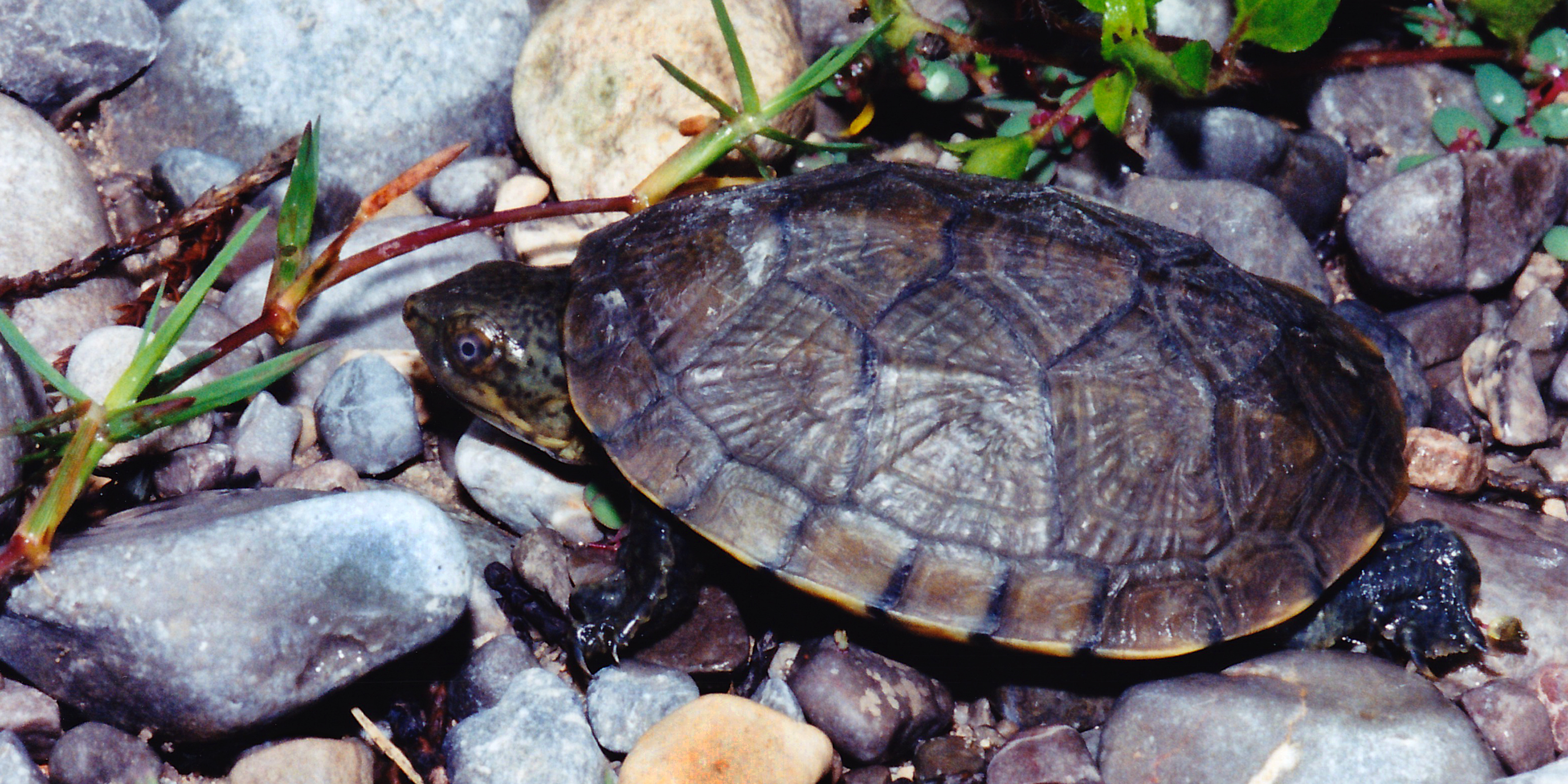
Sub-adult in Tamaulipas, Mexico.

The Mexican mud turtle's nesting season lasts from early May to September, beginning just prior to the summer rainy season. A typical clutch size for each female is 2 to 4 eggs, but can range between 1 and 8.

Another distinctive feature within the species is the nostrils on male and female turtles. The females have a more rounded nostril and the nostril is more brownish as to yellow like the male.

The Mexican mud turtle is an organism that "bet hedges" meaning that its organism fitness varies depending on the condition it is in. When in a relaxed, every-day state, its fitness levels are low, however when stressed its fitness level increases. Bet hedging affects this organism's reproductive window as well, allowing it to only reproduce every two to three seasons.

== Diet ==
Mexican mud turtles are omnivores. Some of the plants consumed include: Filamentous algae, grass seeds, guava seeds, etcetera. Some of the animals consumed include: Ants, wasps, bees, etcetera. It has been found that during the dry seasons, females tend to eat more plant matter than males.

== Sources ==
- Le Conte, 1854: "Description of four new species of Kinosternum". Proceedings of the Academy of Natural Sciences of Philadelphia. 7: 180–190.
- Iverson, John B. (1999). "Reproduction in the Mexican Mud Turtle Kinosternon integrum". Journal of Herpetology. 33 (1): 144–148. doi:10.2307/1565557. JSTOR 1565557.
- Macip-Ríos, Rodrigo; Cisneros, Maria de Lourdes Arias; Aguilar-Miguel, Xochitl S.; Casas-Andreu, Gustavo (2009). "Population Ecology and Reproduction of the Mexican Mud Turtle (Kinosternon integrum) in Tonatico, Estado de México". Western North American Naturalist. 69 (4): 501–510. doi:10.3398/064.069.0410. S2CID 59423562.
- Aparicio, Ángeles; Mercado, Ivette Enríquez; Ugalde, Alejandro Montiel; Gaona-Murillo, Eder; Butterfield, Taggert; Macip-Ríos, Rodrigo (2018). "Ecological Observations of the Mexican Mud Turtle (Kinosternon integrum) in the Pátzcuaro Basin, Michoacán, México". Chelonian Conservation and Biology. 17 (2): 284. doi:10.2744/CCB-1305.1. S2CID 92499132.
- Macip-Ríos, Rodrigo; Sustaita-Rodríguez, Víctor Hugo; Barrios-Quiroz, Gabriel; Casas-Andreu, Gustavo (2010). "Alimentary Habits of the Mexican Mud Turtle (Kinosternon integrum) in Tonatico, Estado de México". Chelonian Conservation and Biology. 9: 90–97. doi:10.2744/CCB-0782.1. S2CID 85867435.
- Macip-Ríos, Rodrigo & Zuñiga Vega, Jaime & Brauer Robleda, Pablo & Casas-Andreu, Gustavo (2011). "Demography of two populations of the Mexican mud turtle (Kinosternon integrum) in central Mexico". Herpetological Journal. 21.
