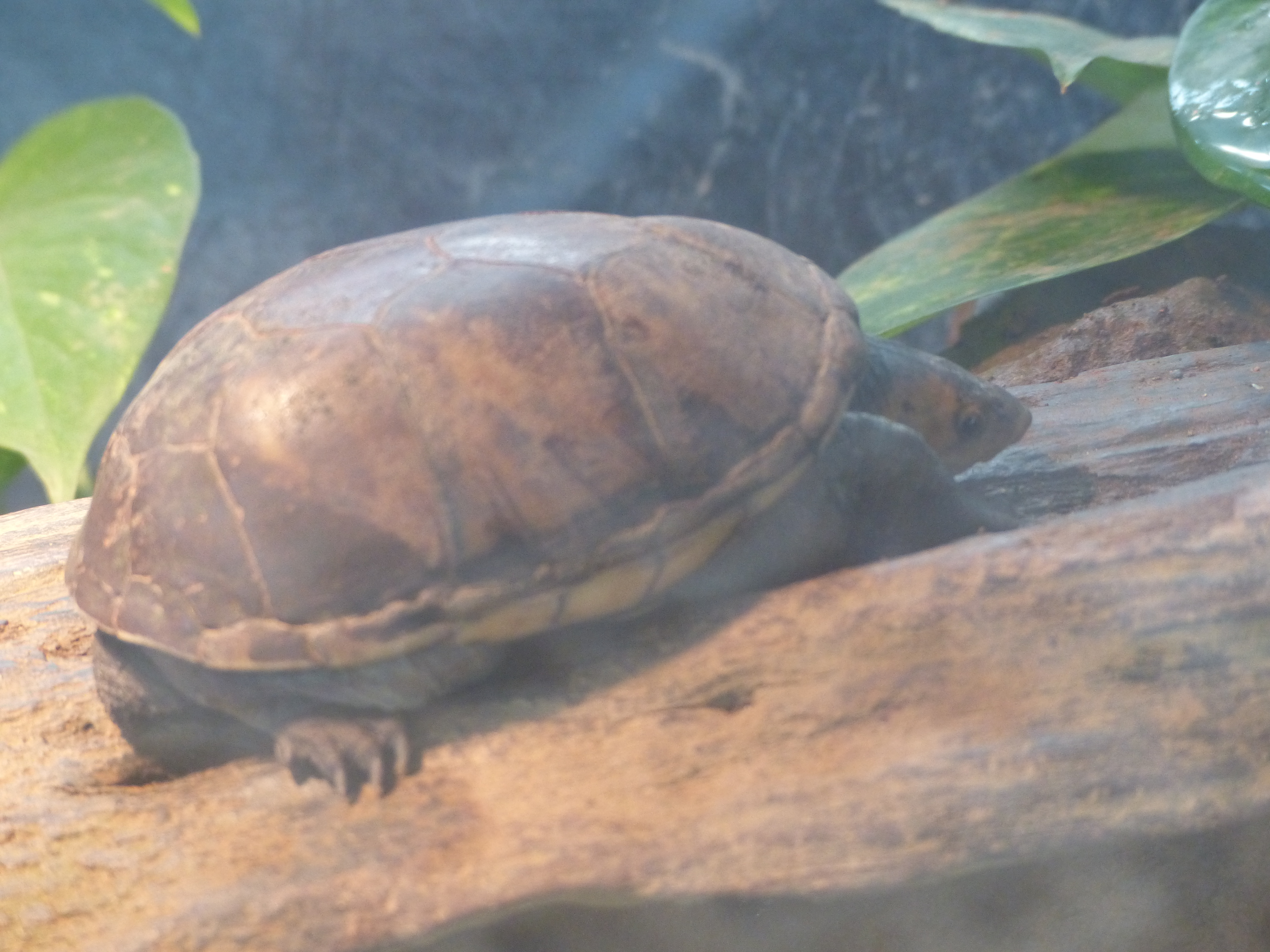

Conservation status
- Vulnerable (IUCN 3.1)

Scientific classification
- Kingdom: Animalia
- Phylum: Chordata
- Class: Reptilia
- Order: Testudines
- Suborder: Cryptodira
- Family: Kinosternidae
- Genus: Kinosternon
- Species: K. angustipons

Binomial name
- Kinosternon angustipons Legler, 1965

Synonyms
- Cryptochelys angustipons (Legler, 1965)

= Central American mud turtle =

Species of turtle

The Central American mud turtle (Kinosternon angustipons), also known as the narrow-bridged mud turtle, is a species of mud turtle in the Kinosternidae family endemic to Central America. It can be found in the following countries: Costa Rica, Nicaragua and Panama. In terms of reproduction, the female Central American mud Turtle can lay up to 4 eggs at time of reproduction, and multiple times a year.
