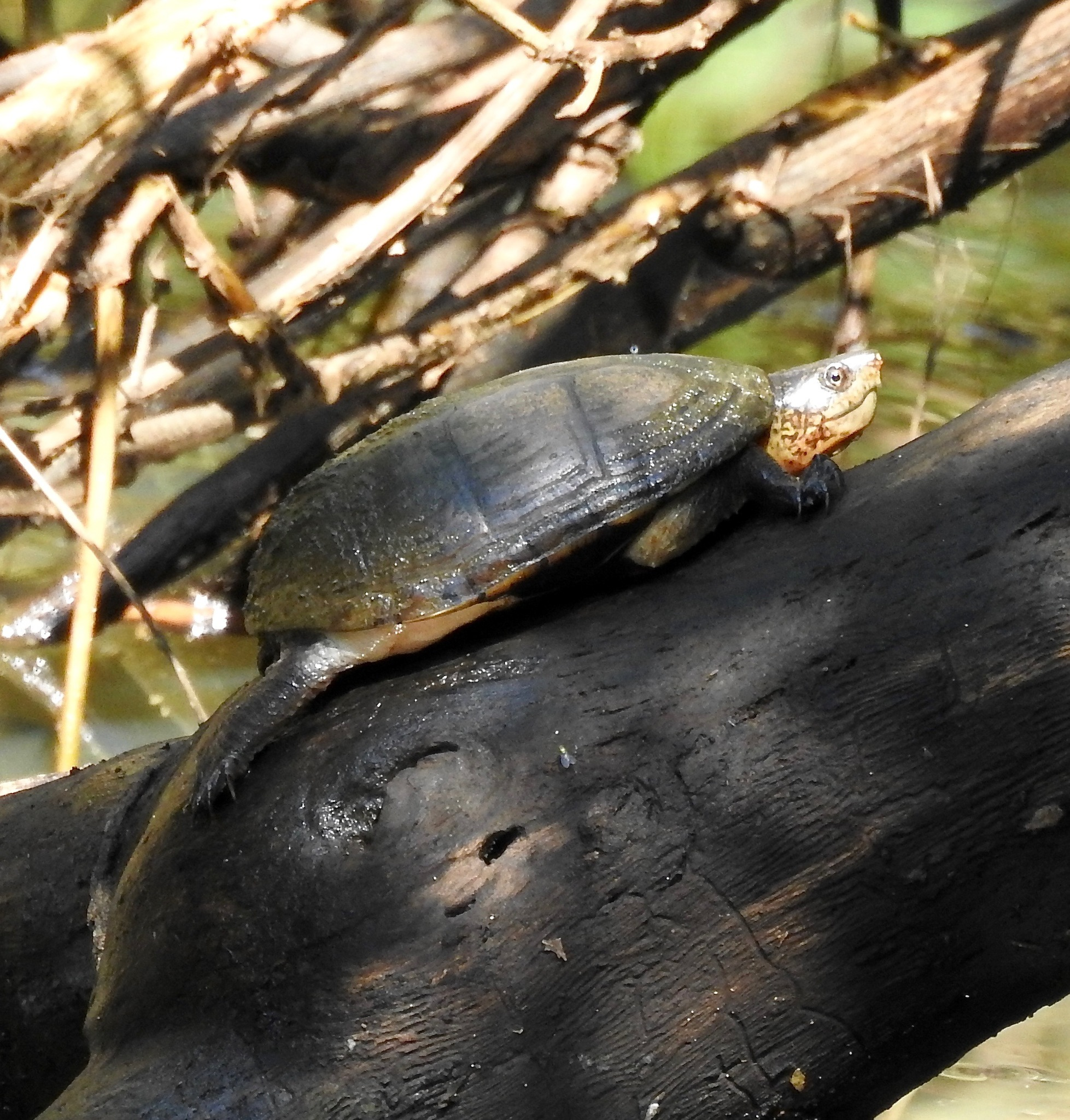

Conservation status
- Least Concern (IUCN 3.1)

Scientific classification
- Kingdom: Animalia
- Phylum: Chordata
- Class: Reptilia
- Order: Testudines
- Suborder: Cryptodira
- Family: Kinosternidae
- Genus: Kinosternon
- Species: K. chimalhuaca

Binomial name
- Kinosternon chimalhuaca (Berry, Seidel & Iverson, 1997)

Synonyms
- Kinosternon chimalhuaca Berry, Seidel & Iverson, 1995 (nomen nudum); Kinosternon chimalhuaca Berry, Seidel & Iverson, 1996

= Jalisco mud turtle =

Species of turtle

The Jalisco mud turtle (Kinosternon chimalhuaca) is a species of mud turtle in the Kinosternidae family endemic to Mexico. It is found in Colima and Jalisco. They live in freshwater habitats like swamps or quiet rivers. Jalisco mud turtles reproduce oviparous, meaning the eggs hatch after the parent has laid them. Population size is unknown; there have been less than 20 individuals seen in the last twenty years. The mud turtle is said to be adapted to aquatic habitats, meaning that a population decline is then expected due to habitat fragmentation.
