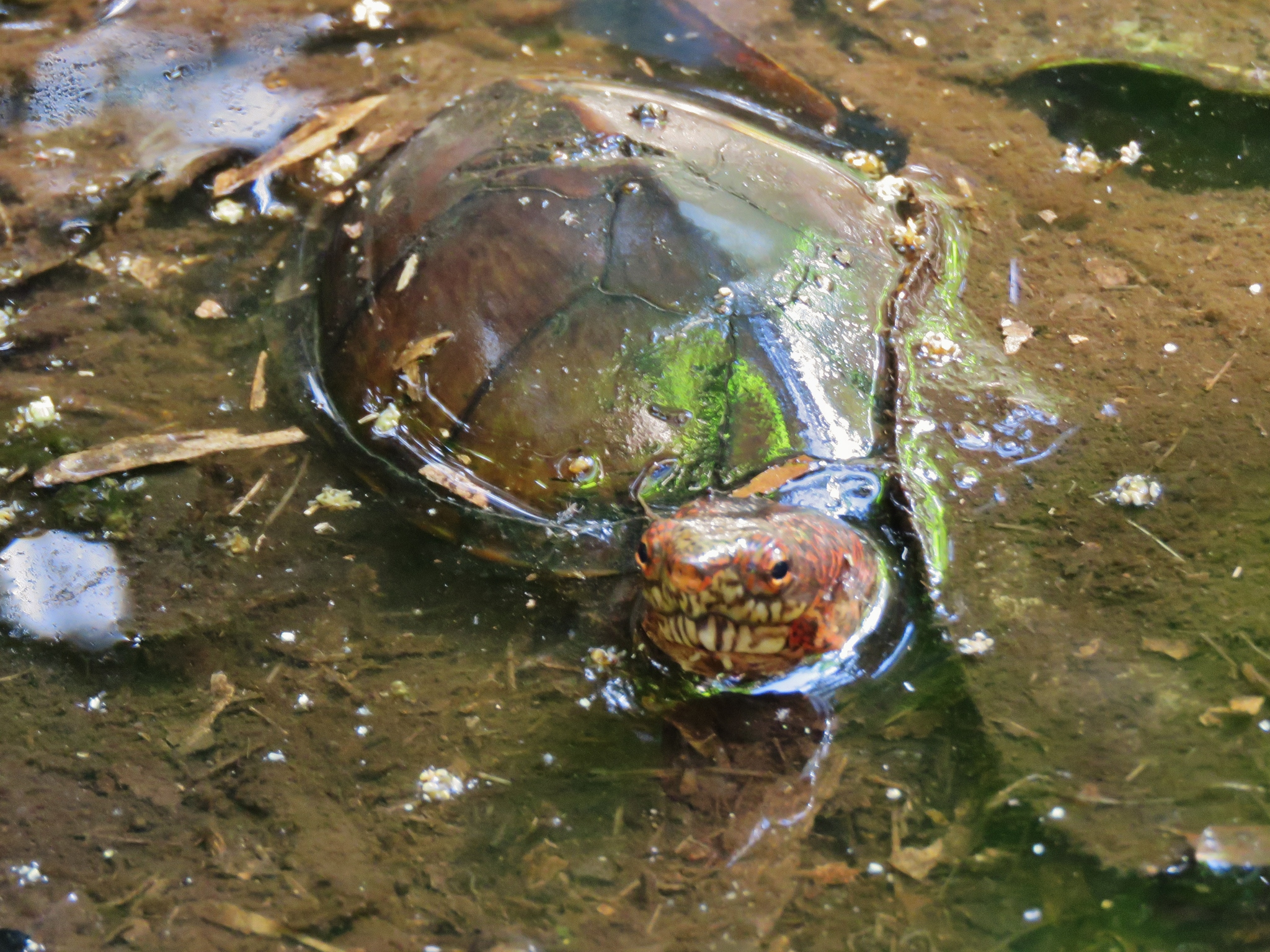
- In Belize

Conservation status
- Near Threatened (IUCN 3.1)

Scientific classification
- Kingdom: Animalia
- Phylum: Chordata
- Class: Reptilia
- Order: Testudines
- Suborder: Cryptodira
- Family: Kinosternidae
- Genus: Kinosternon
- Species: K. acutum

Binomial name
- Kinosternon acutum Gray, 1831

Synonyms
- List: Kinosternon scorpioides var. acuta Gray, 1831; Cinosternum berendtianum Cope, 1865; Cinosternon berendtianum Troschel, 1866; Cinosternon effeldtii Peters, 1873; Cinosternum effeldtii Günther, 1885; Cinosternum effeldti Gadow, 1905 (ex errore); Kinosternon berendtianum Mertens, Müller & Rust, 1934; Kinosternon acutum Stejneger, 1941; Kinosternon berentianum Duellman, 1965 (ex errore)

= Tabasco mud turtle =

Species of turtle

The Tabasco mud turtle (Kinosternon acutum), commonly known as pochitoque in Tabasco, Mexico, is a small turtle which belongs to the family Kinosternidae. It can be found in central Veracruz, Tabasco, northern Guatemala and Belize. This turtle lives in small streams, marshes and ponds. Its feeding habits are mainly carnivorous and it is a nocturnal animal. Although this turtle doesn't have a wide range it can be common at some sites. In Tabasco this turtle is an important part of its popular culture as well as being an ingredient in Tabasco's gastronomy in spite of its special protected status.

In Campeche, Mexico

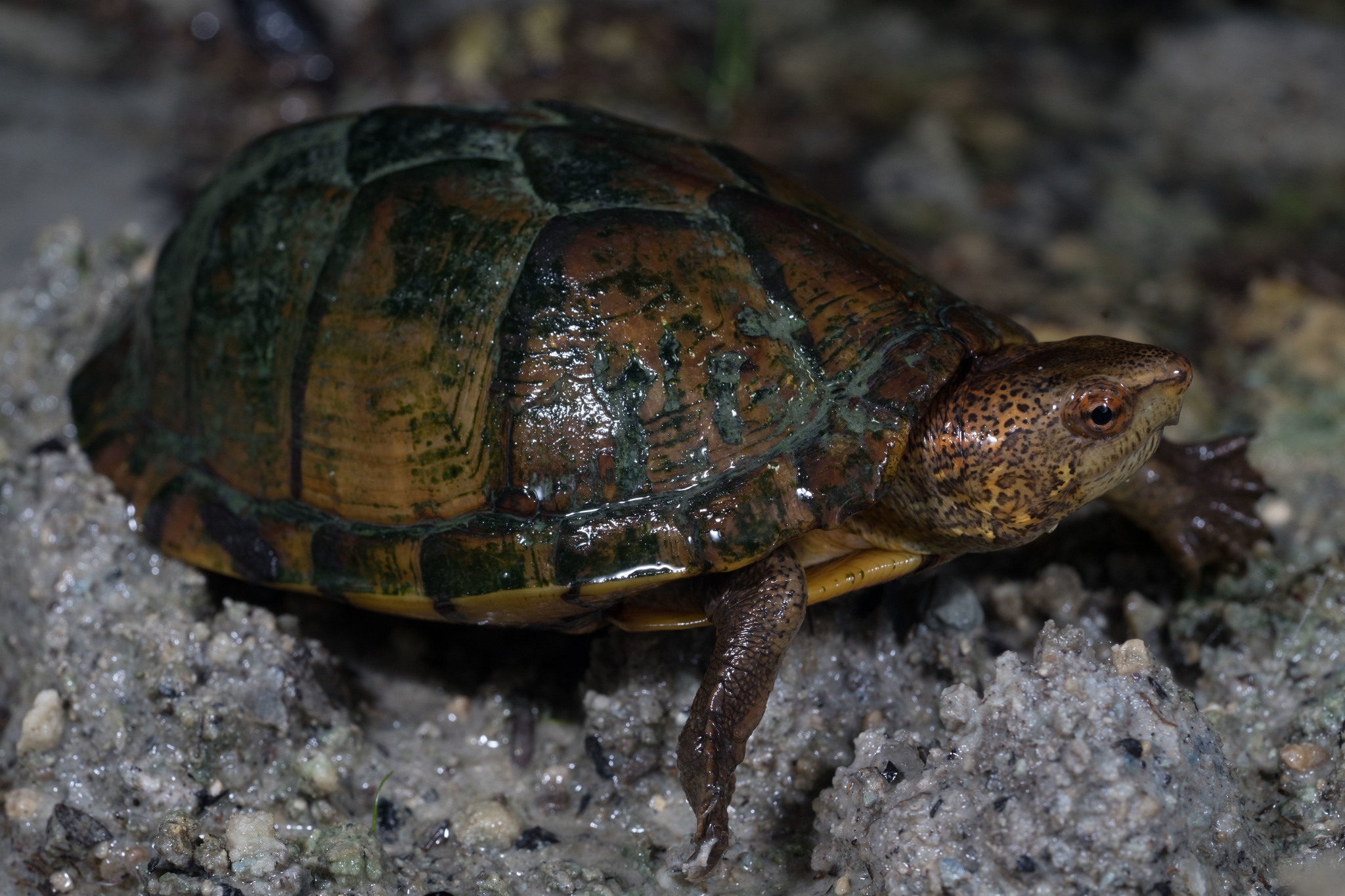

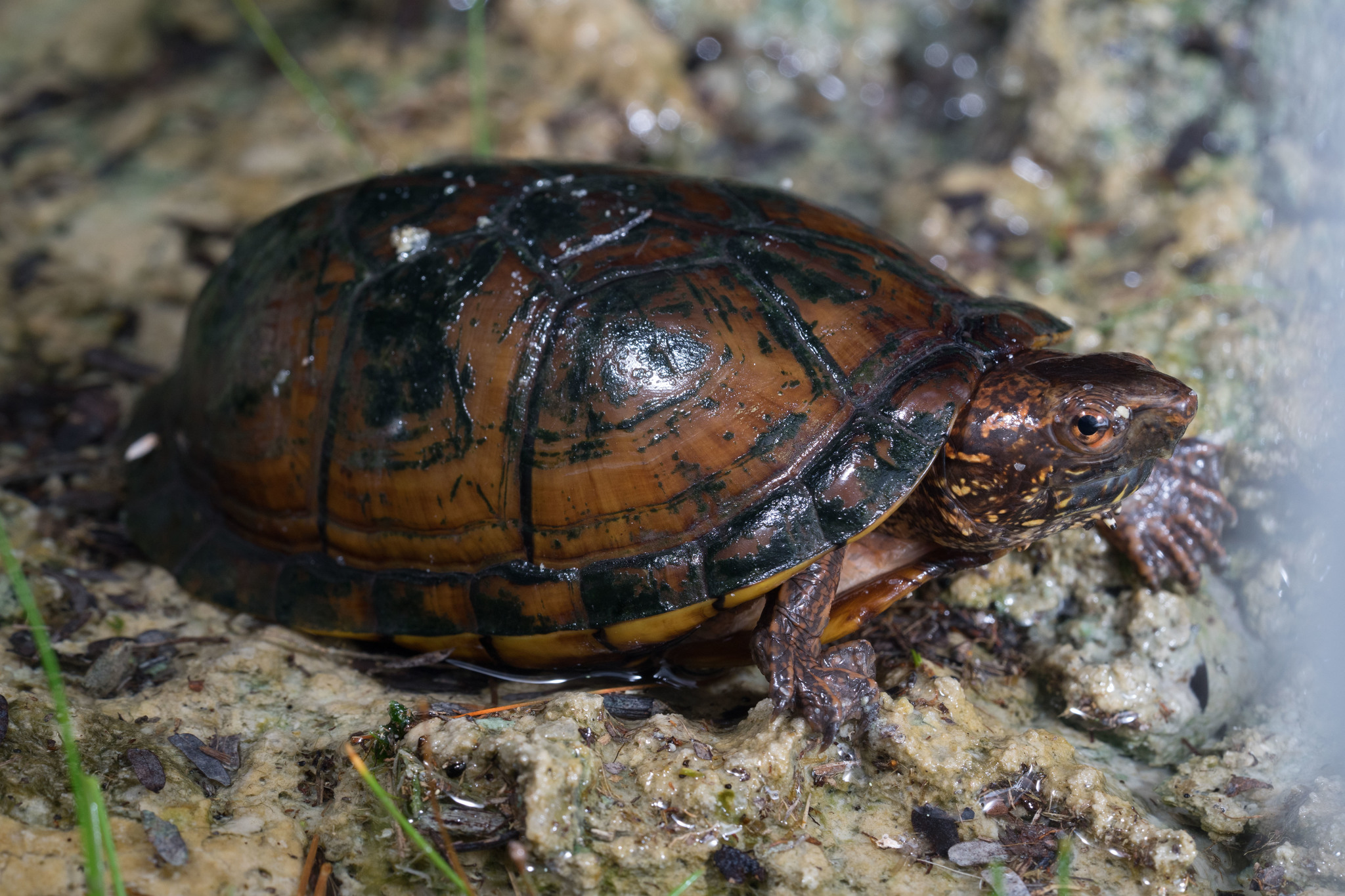

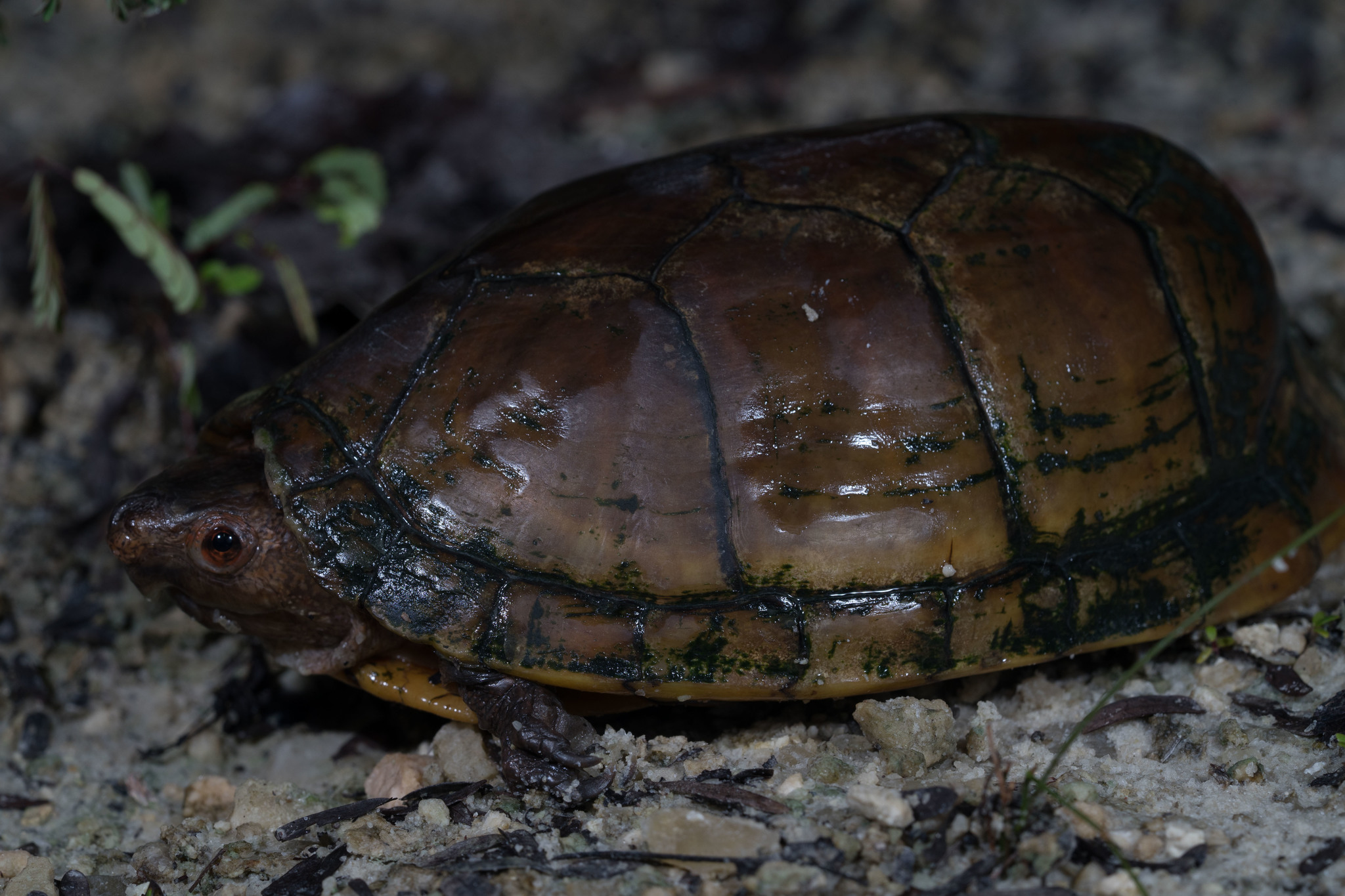

== Pochitoque in Tabasco's culture ==
In this south Mexican state this turtle has a significant importance. Since ancient time Chontales have used it as an ingredient in their traditional kitchen so next to other turtle species (jicotea and mojina), pochitoque has a huge demand among people of these Chontal communities as well as in restaurants of typical food. Pochitoque is roasted and then is eaten as a green soup with rice, this is called "pochitoque en verde".

The pochitoque is a main character in some Chontal legends. Among Chontal people, it is said that if a crocodile eats a pochitoque, this turtle eats the crocodile from the inside and survives by killing the crocodile.

Due to its protagonism in these stories, some poets and singers from Tabasco use pochitoque as an inspiration for their poems and songs and there is a dance of pochitoque as well. The song "Pochitoque Jahuactero" sang by a popular singer from Tabasco, talks about a pochitoque that needs to be careful when going out of his swamp.

== Special protected status ==
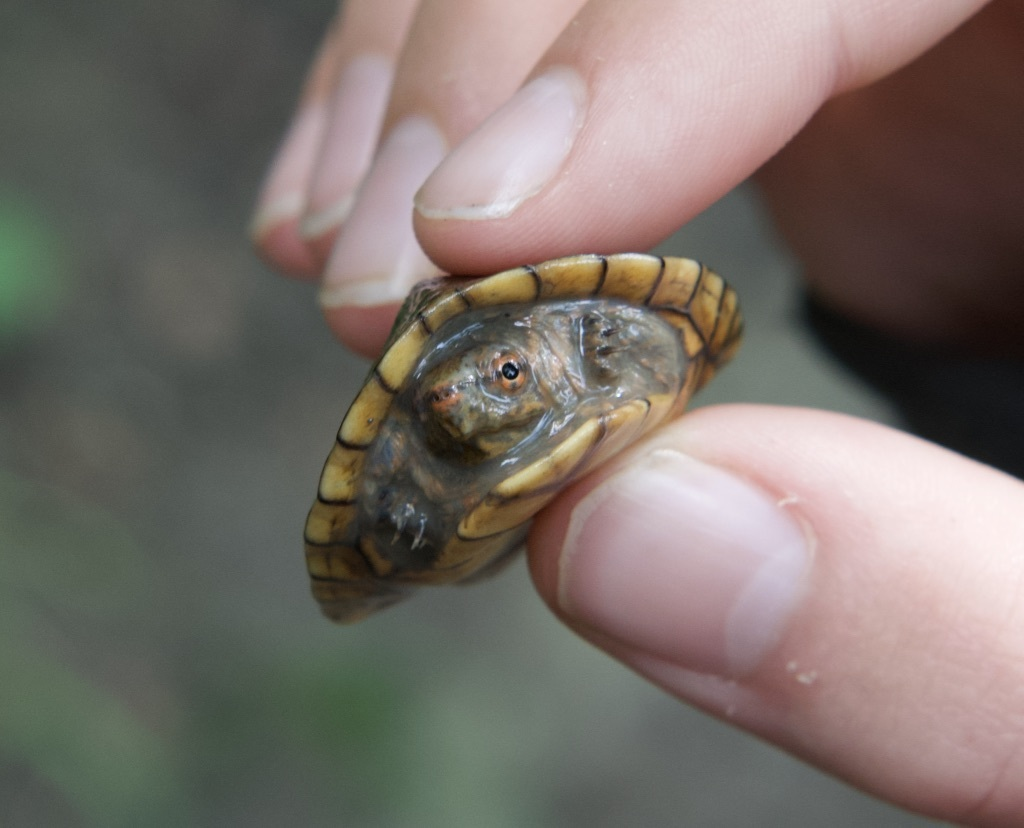
Young turtle, Guatemala

This turtle is vulnerable because it is eaten by locals and because of its limited range. Hunting and eating this turtle is prohibited but poaching continues. Pochitoque even has been identified in international traffic. In 2012, a Russian citizen was surprised with 322 pochitoques in his case. According to Norma Oficial Mexicana (NOM059 ECOL 2001), this species has a special protected status. Different organizations operate in order to protect this species as well as help them in the process of its conservation. Communities in some states in Mexico dedicate their efforts to creating hatcheries to maintain and increase the species' numbers.
