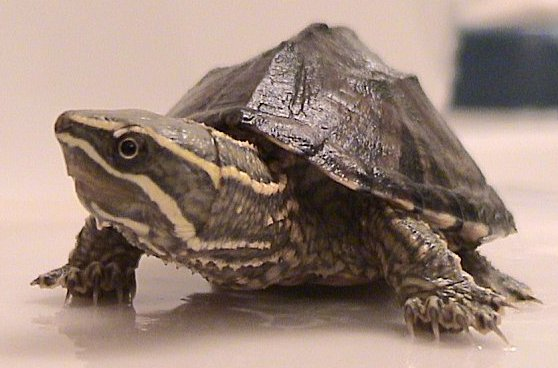
- Common musk turtle, Sternotherus odoratus

Scientific classification
- Kingdom: Animalia
- Phylum: Chordata
- Class: Reptilia
- Order: Testudines
- Suborder: Cryptodira
- Superfamily: Kinosternoidea
- Family: Kinosternidae; Agassiz, 1857

Genera
- Kinosternon; Sternotherus; Claudius; Staurotypus

Synonyms
- Cinosternoidae - Agassiz, 1857; Kinosterna - Gray, 1869; Kinosternidae - Hay, 1892

= Kinosternidae =

Family of turtles

The Kinosternidae are a family of mostly small turtles that includes the mud turtles and musk turtles. The family contains 25 species within four genera, but taxonomic reclassification is an ongoing process, so many sources vary on the exact numbers of species and subspecies. They inhabit slow-moving bodies of water, often with soft, muddy bottoms and abundant vegetation.

== Description ==
Most kinosternids are small turtles, 10–15 cm (3.9–5.9 in) in carapace length. The highly domed carapace has a distinct keel down its center. The genus Staurotypus gets much larger, to 30 cm (12 in). Females are generally larger than males, but males have much longer tails. Kinosternids can be black, brown, green, or yellowish in color. Most species do not have shell markings, but some species have radiating black markings on each carapace scute. Some species have distinctive yellow striping along the sides of the head and neck.

The musk turtles are so named because they are capable of releasing a foul-smelling musk from glands under the rear of their shells when disturbed. They are native to North America and South America.

== Diet ==
All members of the family are carnivorous, feeding on crustaceans, aquatic insects, mollusks, annelids, amphibians, small fish, and sometimes carrion. They also eat vegetation such as aquatic plants. In captivity they can eat red and green leaf lettuce.

== Reproduction ==
Kinosternids lay about four hard-shelled eggs during the late spring and early summer. After hatching, some species overwinter in a subterranean nest, emerging the following spring. Some adults also spend the winter on land, constructing a burrow with a small air hole used on warm days.

Kinosternids contain the only species of turtle known, or at least suspected, to exhibit parental care. Studies of the yellow mud turtle in Nebraska, United States, suggest females sometimes stay with the nest and may urinate on the eggs long after laying, to either keep them moist or to protect them from snake predation (by making them less palatable).

Some kinosternids, particularly those in the genera Claudius and Staurotypus, exhibit genetic sex determination; in Staurotypus this is XY sex determination, and the same is suspected to be true of Claudius as well. Kinosternon and Sternotherus have temperature-dependent sex determination as is typical of turtles.

== Taxonomy ==
Family Kinosternidae

- Genus †Baltemys velogastros
- Genus †Xenochelys floridensis
- Genus †Yelmochelys
- Subfamily Kinosterninae
  - Genus Kinosternon
    - Tabasco mud turtle - K. acutum Gray, 1831
    - Alamos mud turtle - K. alamosae Berry & Legler, 1980
    - Central American mud turtle - K. angustipons Legler, 1965
    - Arizona mud turtle - K. arizonense Gilmore, 1923
    - Striped mud turtle - K. baurii (Garman, 1891)
    - Jalisco mud turtle - K. chimalhuaca Berry, Seidel, & Iverson, 1996
    - Creaser's mud turtle - K. creaseri Hartweg, 1934
    - Dunn's mud turtle - K. dunni Schmidt, 1947
    - Durango mud turtle - K. durangoense Iverson, 1979
    - Yellow mud turtle - K. flavescens (Agassiz, 1857)
    - Herrera's mud turtle - K. herrerai Stejneger, 1925
    - Rough-footed mud turtle - K. hirtipes (Wagler, 1830)
      - Valley of Mexico mud turtle - K. h. hirtipes (Wagler, 1830)
      - Lake Chapala mud turtle - K. h. chapalaense (Iverson, 1981)
      - San Juanico mud turtle - K. h. magdalense (Iverson, 1981)
      - Viesca mud turtle - K. h. megacephalum (extinct) (Iverson, 1981)
      - Mexican plateau mud turtle - K. h. murrayi (Glass and Hartweg, 1951)
      - Patzcuarco mud turtle - K. h. tarascense (Inverson, 1981)
    - Mexican mud turtle - K. integrum (LeConte, 1954)
    - White-lipped mud turtle - K. leucostomum Duméril, Bibron & Duméril, 1851
      - Northern white-lipped mud turtle - K. l. leucostomum Duméril, Bibron & Duméril, 1851
      - Southern white-lipped mud turtle - K. l. postinguinale (Cope, 1887)
    - Oaxaca mud turtle - K. oaxacae Berry & Iverson, 1980
    - Scorpion mud turtle - K. scorpioides (Linnaeus, 1766)
      - Scorpion mud turtle (subspecies) - K. s. scorpioides (Linnaeus, 1766)
      - Central Chiapas mud turtle - K. s. abaxillare (Baur, 1925)
      - White-throated mud turtle - K. s. albogulare (Duméril and Bibron, 1870)
      - Red-cheeked mud turtle - K. s. cruentatum (Duméril, Bibron & Duméril, 1851)
    - Sonora mud turtle - K. sonoriense (Le Conte, 1854)
      - Sonora mud turtle (subspecies) - K. s. sonoriense (Le Conte, 1854)
      - Sonoyta mud turtle - K. s. longifemorale (Inverson, 1981)
    - Eastern mud turtle - K. subrubrum (Bonnaterre, 1789)
      - Eastern mud turtle (subspecies) - K. s. subrubrum (Bonnaterre, 1789)
      - Mississippi mud turtle - K. s. hippocrepis (Bonnaterre, 1789)
      - Florida mud turtle - K. s. steindachneri (Siebenrock, 1906)
  - Genus Sternotherus
    - Razor-backed musk turtle, S. carinatus (Gray, 1856)
    - Flattened musk turtle, S. depressus (Tinkle & Webb, 1955)
    - Intermediate musk turtle, S. intermedius Scott, Glenn & Rissler, 2017
    - Loggerhead musk turtle, S. minor (Agassiz, 1857)
    - Common musk turtle or stinkpot, S. odoratus (Sonnini & Latreille, 1801)
    - Stripeneck musk turtle, S. peltifer (Smith & Glass, 1947)
- Subfamily Staurotypinae
  - Genus Claudius
    - Narrow-bridged musk turtle, C. angustatus Cope, 1865
  - Genus Staurotypus
    - Giant musk turtle, S. salvinii Gray, 1864
    - Mexican musk turtle, S. triporcatus (Wiegmann, 1828)

== Additional images ==
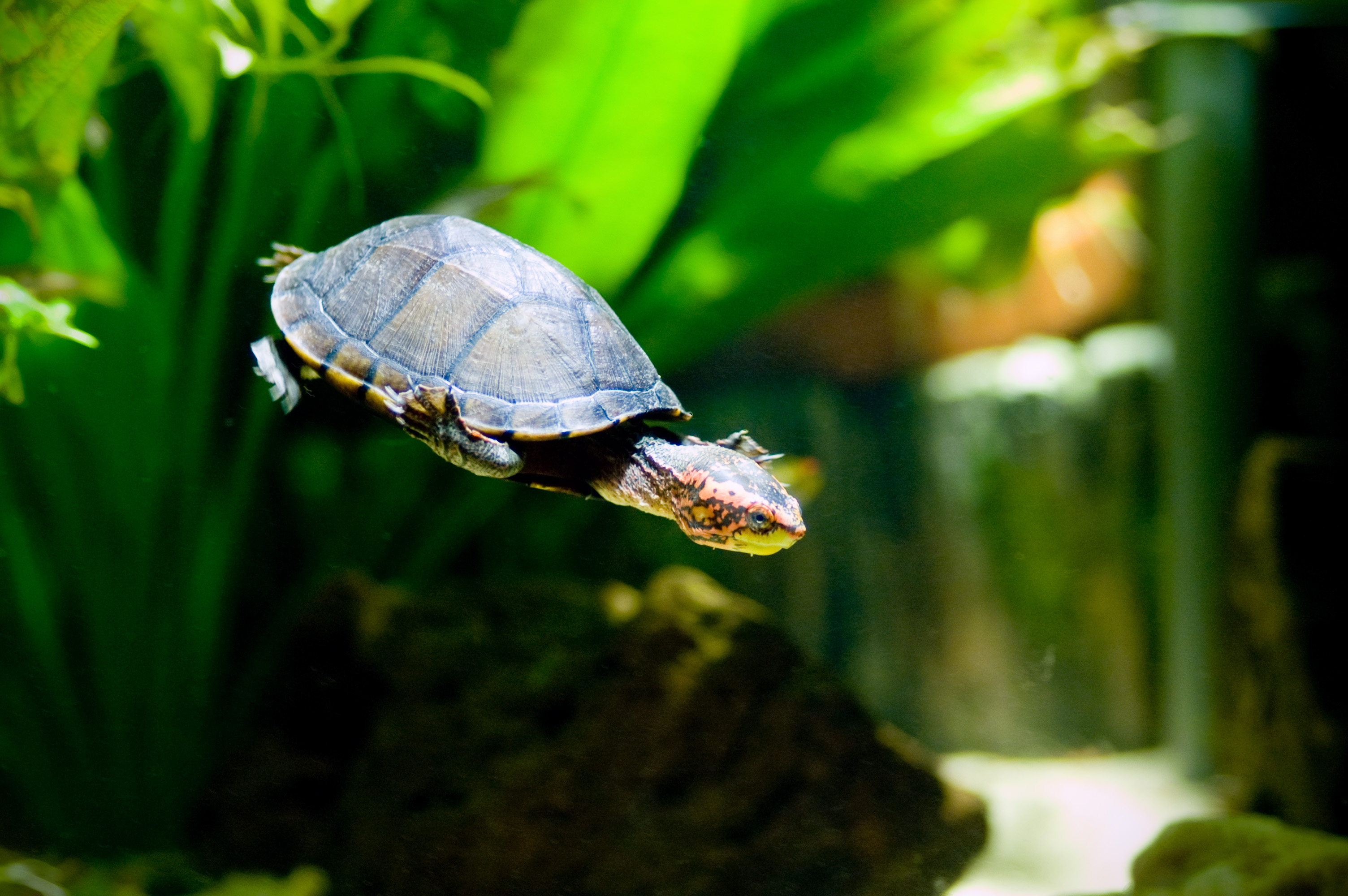
Red-cheeked mud turtle, Kinosternon scorpioides cruentatum

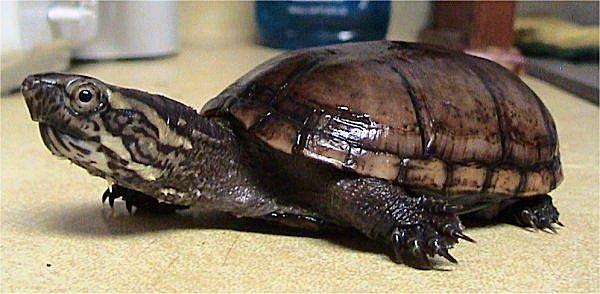
Mississippi mud turtle, Kinosternon subrubrum hippocrepis

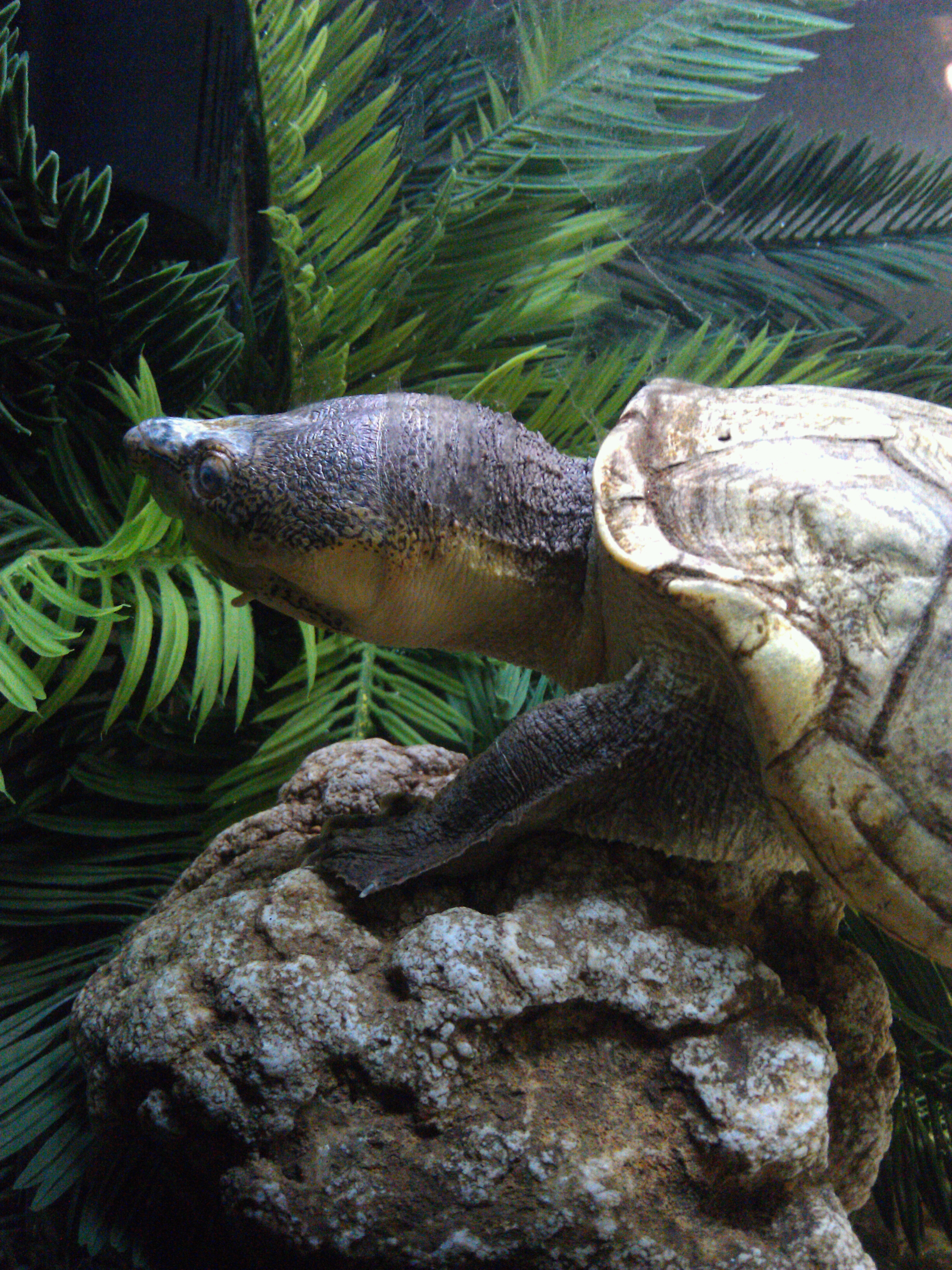
Lake Chapala mud turtle, Kinosternon hirtipes chapalaense

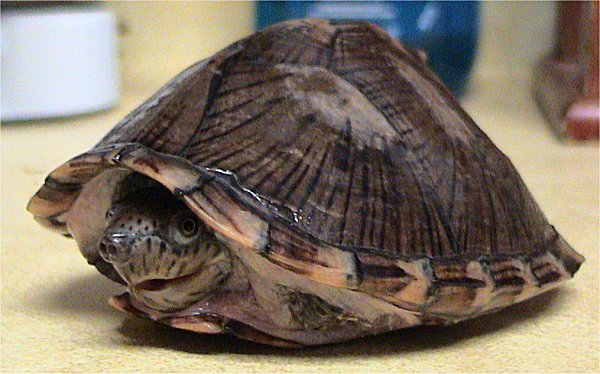
Razorback musk turtle, Sternotherus carinatus

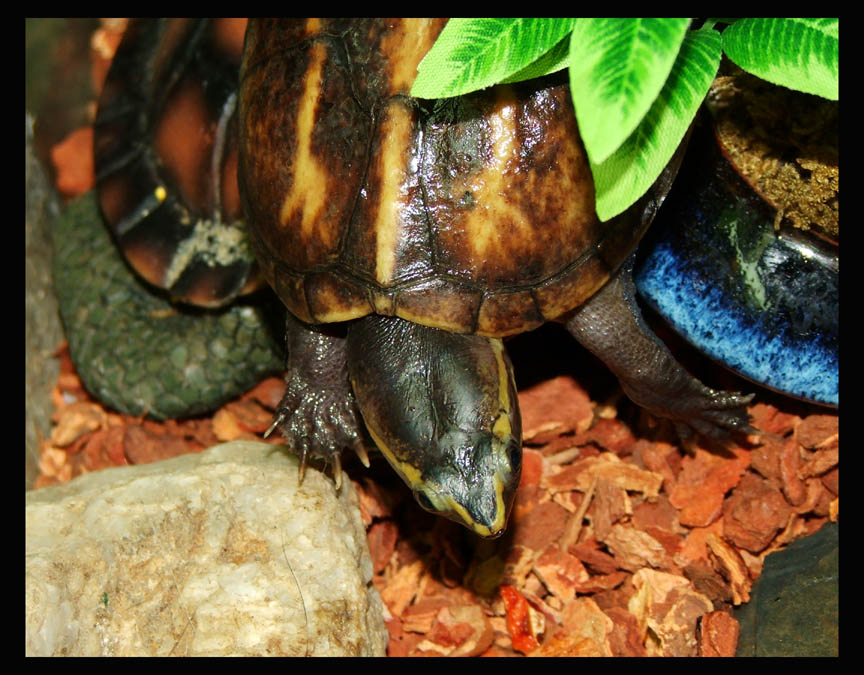
Striped mud turtle, Kinosternon baurii
