= Turtle Pond (Peachtree City) =

Man-made pond feature in Peachtree City, Georgia

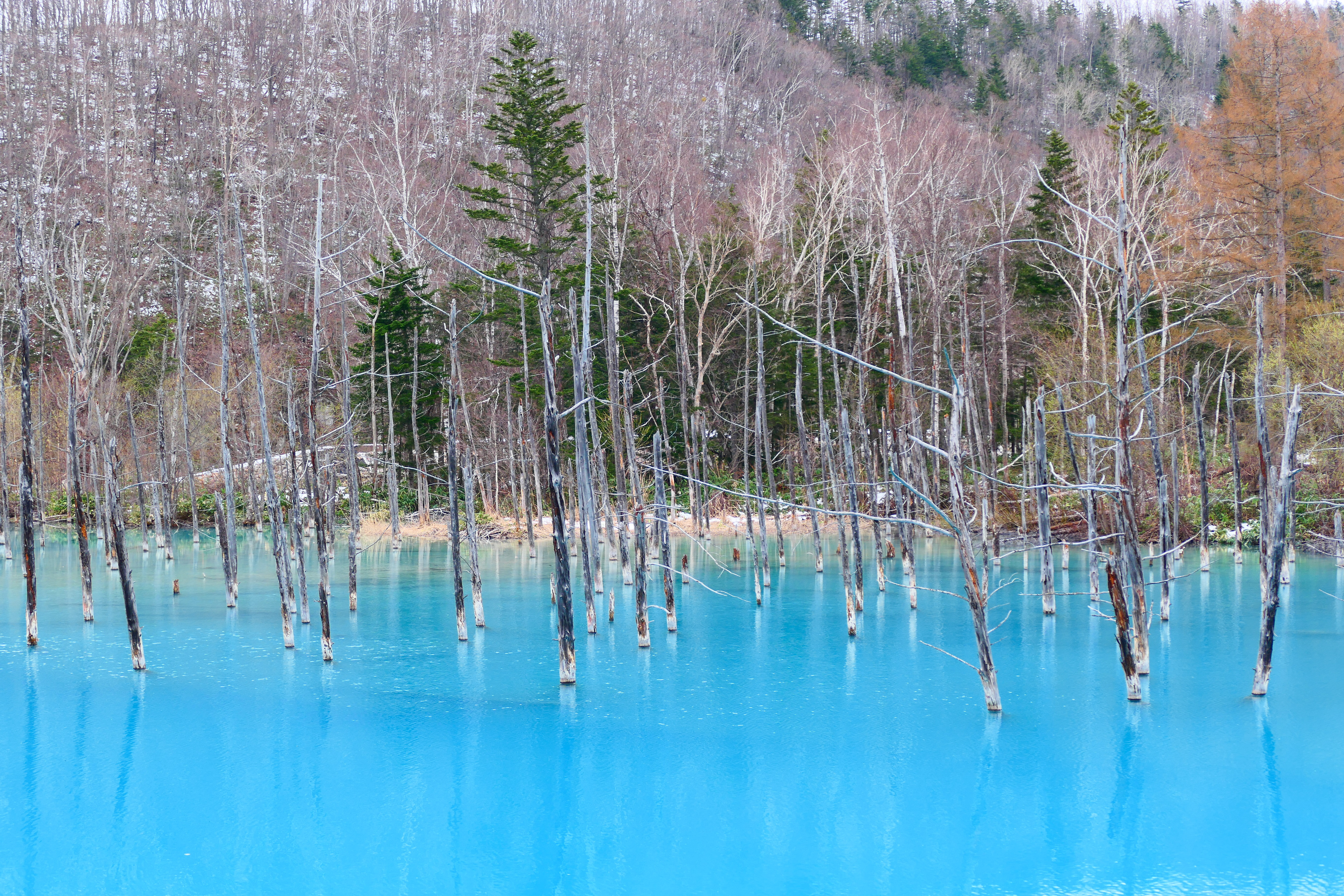
- Turtle Pond in Peachtree City, Georgia

- Location within the United States
- Location: Peachtree City, Georgia, United States
- Coordinates: 33°21′26″N 84°32′24″W
- Type: man-made pond

Turtle Pond is a man-made pond feature in Peachtree City, Georgia, United States. It is incorporated as part of Braelinn Country Club.

Turtle Pond is a popular recreation area in the heart of Peachtree City. Accessible through the city golf cart path network, Turtle Pond offers leisure activities such as fishing, bird watching, and model yacht sailing.

In 1998, Turtle Pond became part of a nationally recognized turtle reintroduction program for musk turtles. The site has also been a center for ongoing reptile tagging and study programs through the Georgia Department of Natural Resources. As of 2023, a thriving colony of musk turtles calls Turtle Pond home.

== Recreation ==
Turtle Pond hosts the Turtle Pond Model Yacht Club.

The location is a significant resting point for migratory birds.
