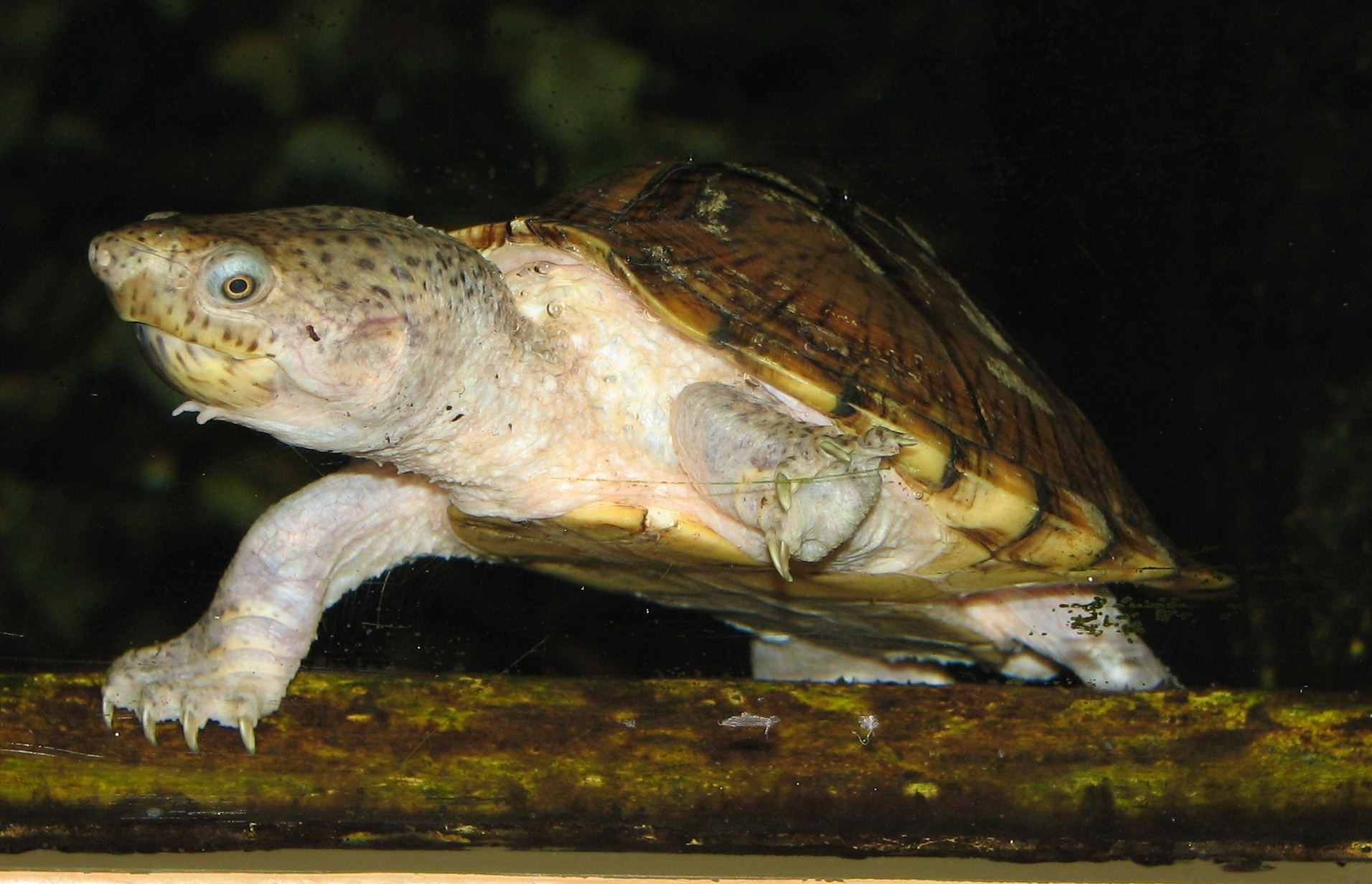
- Adult
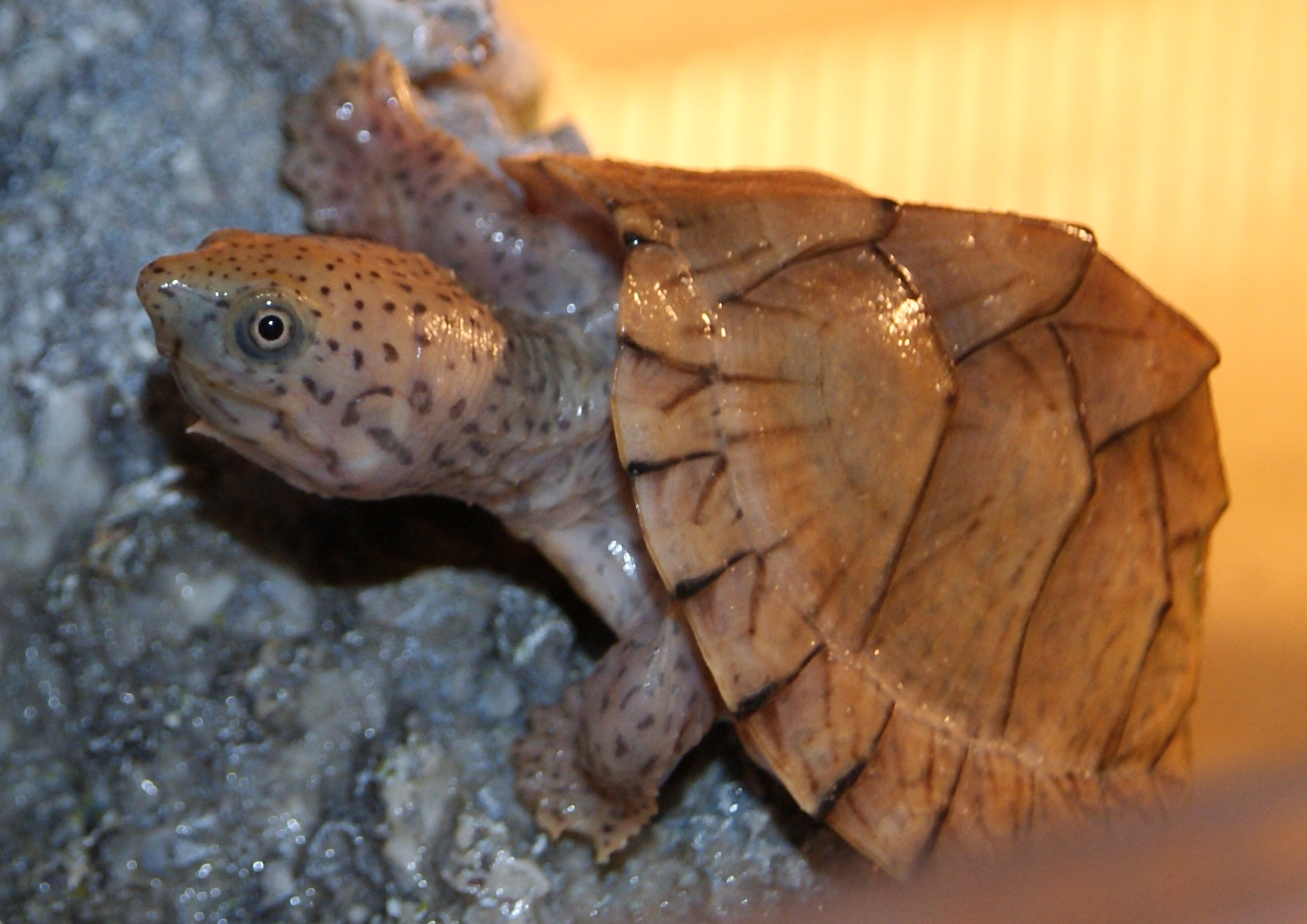
- Young

Conservation status
- Least Concern (IUCN 3.1)

Scientific classification
- Kingdom: Animalia
- Phylum: Chordata
- Class: Reptilia
- Order: Testudines
- Suborder: Cryptodira
- Family: Kinosternidae
- Genus: Sternotherus
- Species: S. carinatus

Binomial name
- Sternotherus carinatus (Gray, 1856)

Synonyms
- List: Aromochelys carinata Gray, 1856; Aromochelys carinatum — Gray, 1856; Ozotheca triquetra Agassiz, 1857; Goniochelys triquetra — Agassiz, 1857; Aromochelys carinatus — Cope, 1867; Goniochelys carinata — Garman, 1884; Cinosternum carinatum — Boulenger, 1889; Kinosternon carinatum — Stejneger & Barbour, 1917; Sternotherus carinatus — Stejneger, 1923; Sternotherus carinatus carinatus — Carr, 1952; Sternothaerus carinatus — Tinkle, 1958; Kinosternon carinatus — Welch, 1994

= Razor-backed musk turtle =

Species of turtle

The razor-backed musk turtle (Sternotherus carinatus) is a species of turtle in the family Kinosternidae. The species is native to the southern United States. There are no subspecies that are recognized as being valid.

The musk turtle is also known as the Mississippi musk turtle. It was first found in Alabama in 1994, but was mainly claimed in Mississippi, hence the second name.

== Geographic range ==
S. carinatus is found in the states of Alabama, Arkansas, Louisiana, Mississippi, Oklahoma, Florida, and Texas.

However, it is only found in certain parts of those states except Louisiana. It is found in southeastern Oklahoma, southern and eastern Texas, southern Arkansas, south-central Mississippi, and extreme southwestern Alabama.

== Description ==
The razor-backed musk turtle grows to a straight carapace length of about 15 cm (5.9 in). It has a brown-colored carapace, with black markings at the edges of each scute. The carapace has a distinct, sharp keel down the center of its length, giving the species its common name.

The body is typically grey-brown in color, with black spotting, as is the head, which tends to have a bulbous shape to it. It has a long neck, short legs, and a sharp beak. Males can usually be distinguished from females by their longer tails.

The plastron is small, with only one hinge which is located anteriorly. There is no gular scute. Barbels are present on the chin only.

As the name suggests, they do have a smell. They use this as a defense mechanism, produced through the musk glands. However, the razor-backed musk turtle is known to not produce as much of a smell, especially the captive turtles.

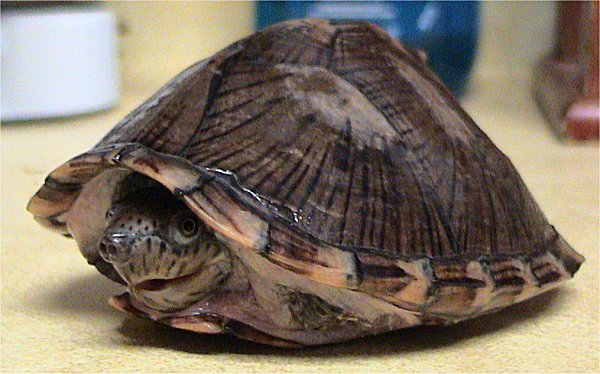
Retracted into shell

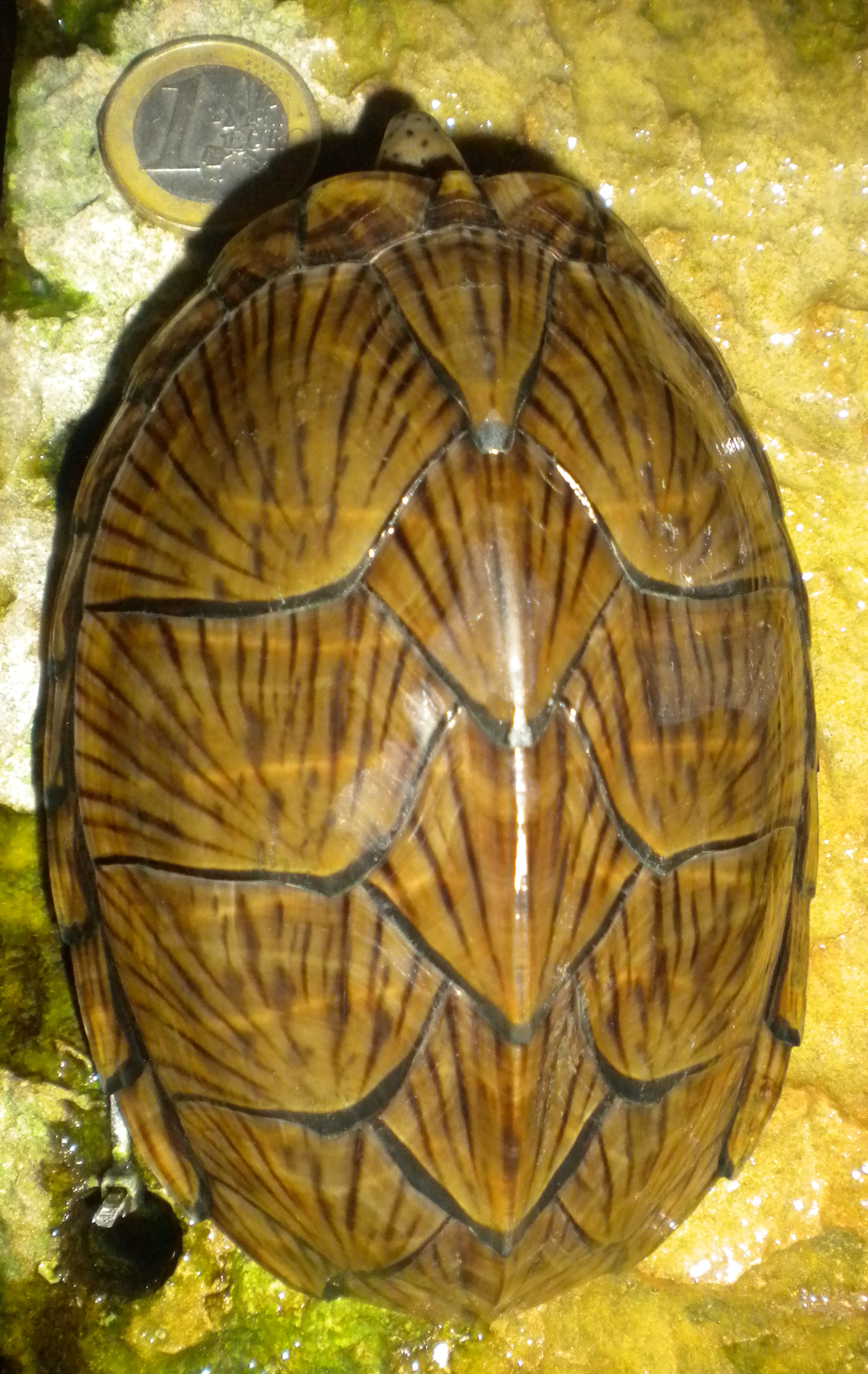
Carapace

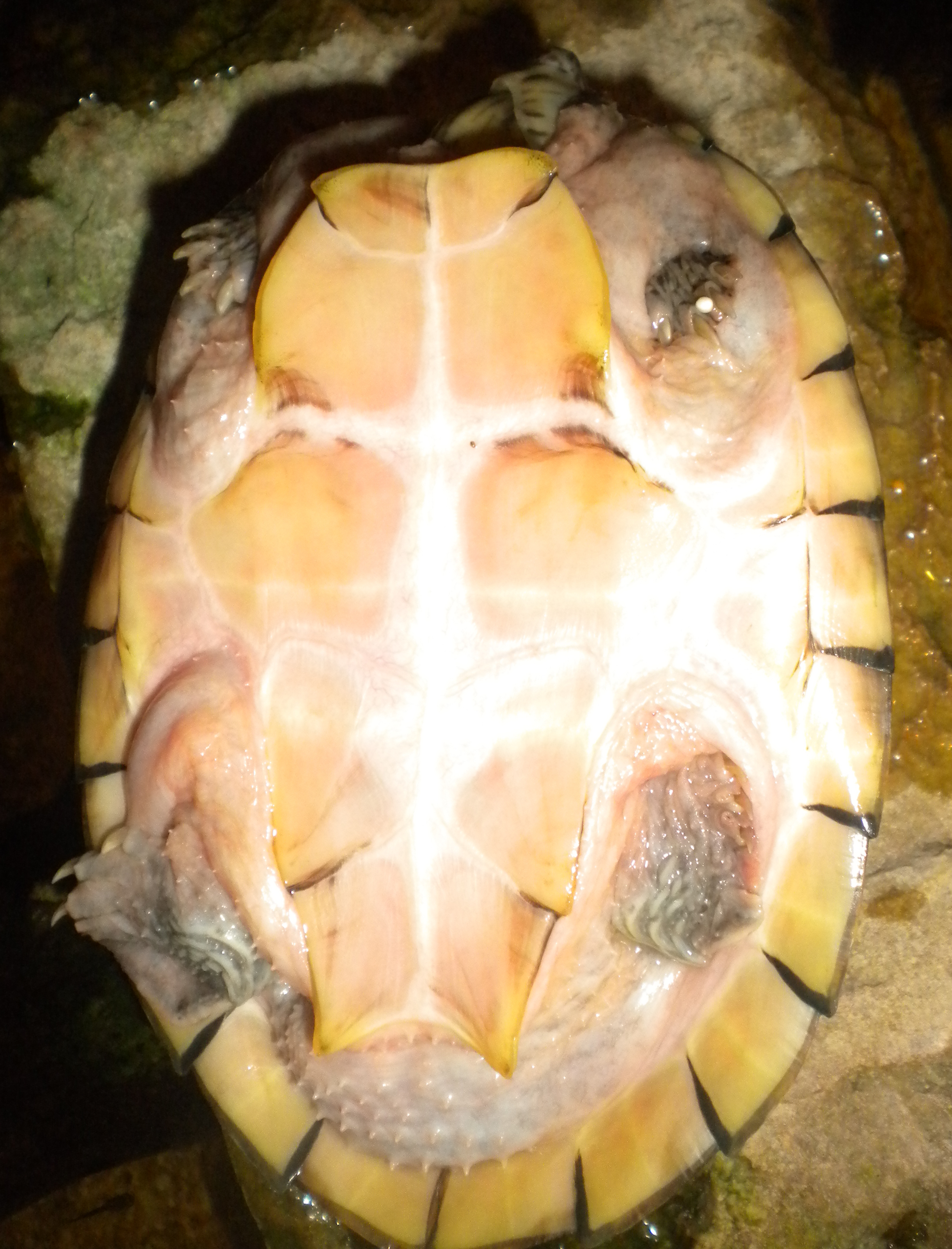
Plastron

== Behavior ==
S. carinatus is almost entirely aquatic, spending most of its time in shallow, heavily vegetated, slow-moving creeks, ponds, streams, and swamps. The only time it typically ventures onto land is when the female lays eggs. However, both sexes bask often. This species is mainly aquatic, but the turtles often like to take advantage of emergent deadwood to bask and has been observed to occasionally climb trees above the water and drop back into the water when threatened. This species enjoys basking more than other species in the same family. This helps the turtles stay in safe areas away from other turtles, lowering competition.

== Reproduction ==
Females tend to reach sexual maturity in four or five years, and males mature in five or six years. For captive turtles, the mating occurs in March, and the eggs are laid in early May and early June. The females lay about one to two batches of eggs per year, with about 5-7 eggs in each batch. Turtles not in captivity have about 2 eggs per batch.

== Diet ==
The diet of S. carinatus consists primarily of aquatic invertebrates, including freshwater clams, crayfish, snails, and various insects. It also feeds on fish, amphibians, carrion, seeds, and aquatic plants.

== Predators ==
These turtles have many predators because of their small size. Eggs are eaten by raccoons and skunks (Mephitis). Hatchlings and juveniles are vulnerable to predators such as diving beetles (Dytiscidae), Florida bass, American bullfrogs, common kingsnakes, cottonmouths, crows (Corvus) and bald eagles. Adults may be eaten by American alligators. Alligator snapping turtles may be a significant predator to this turtle.

== In captivity ==
The razor-backed musk turtle is frequently kept in captivity, and is regularly captive bred. Its relatively small size, hardiness and ease of care makes it a more attractive choice as a pet turtle for many keepers, than the more commonly available red-eared slider (Trachemys scripta elegans). There is disagreement in sources how old musk turtles can get in captivity with estimates ranging between 20 and 50 years.

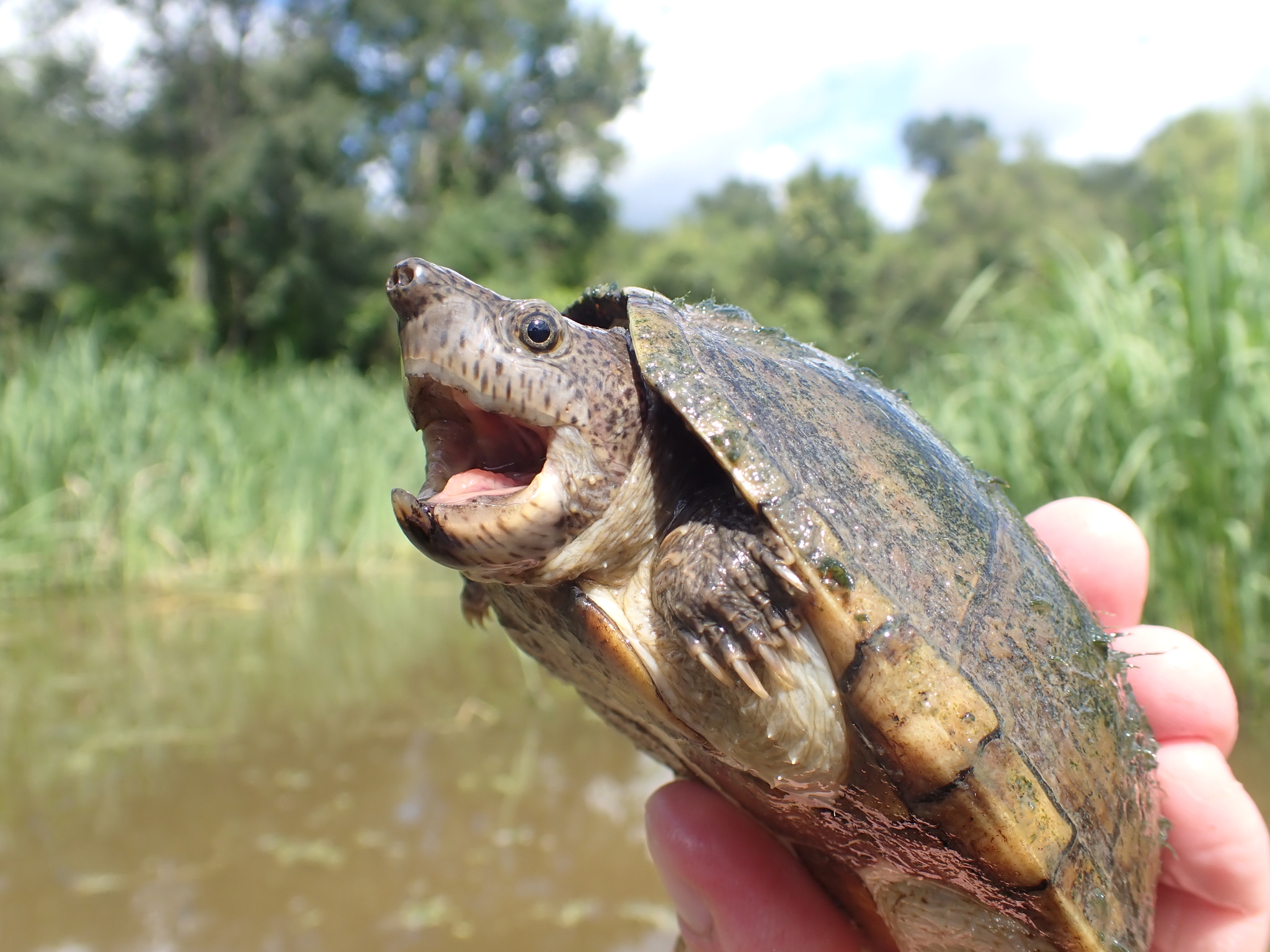
Texas

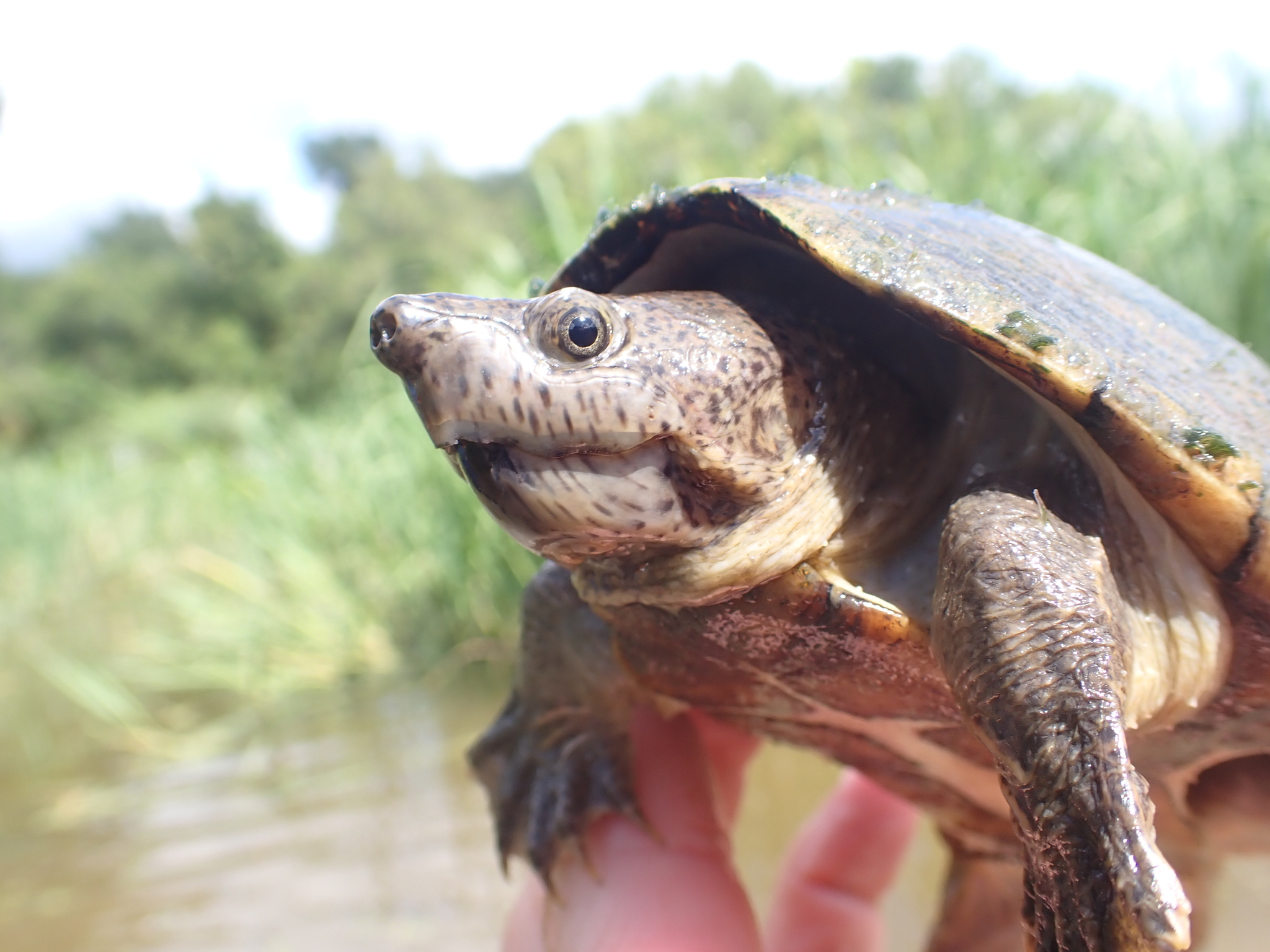
Texas

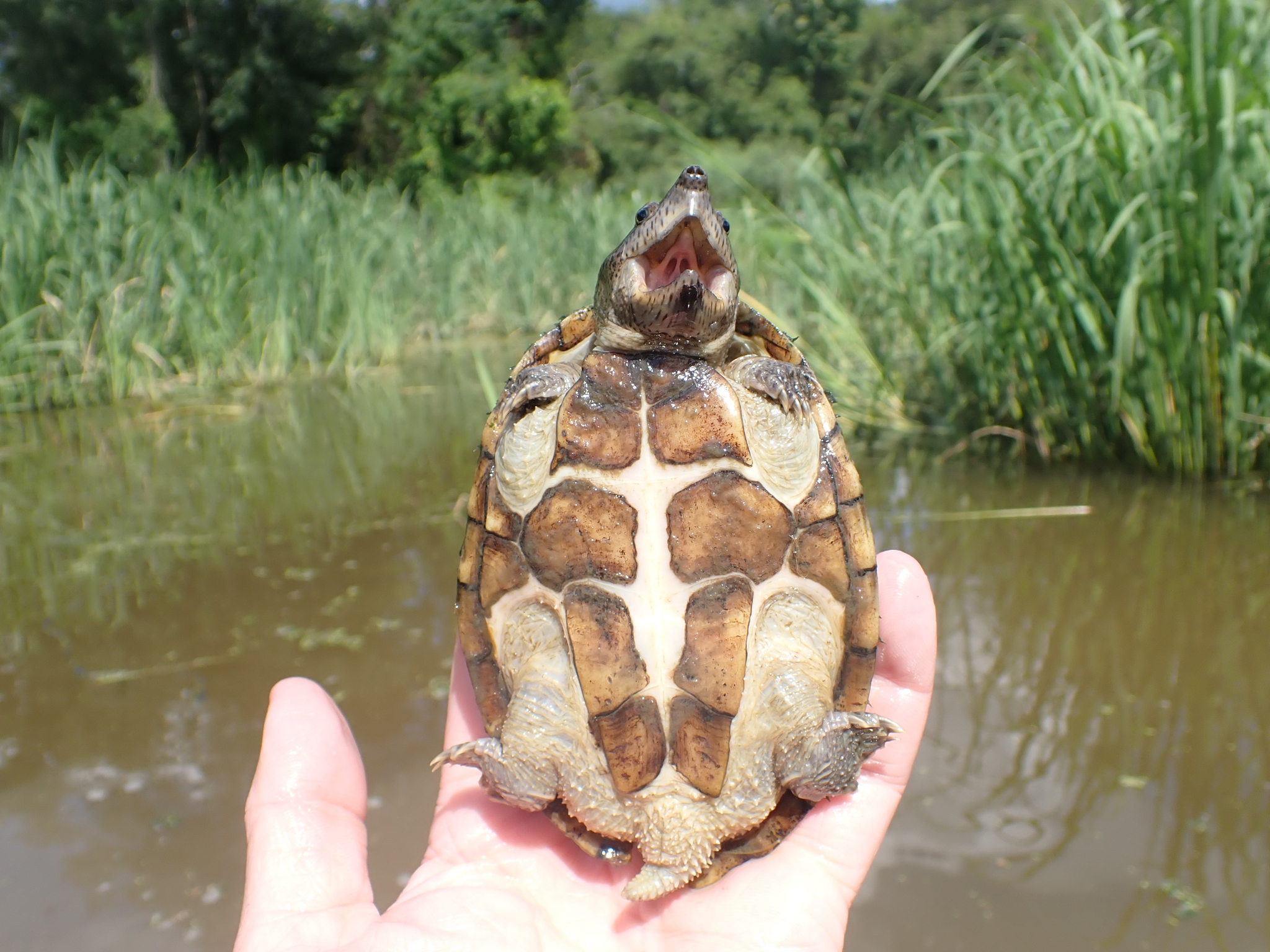
Texas

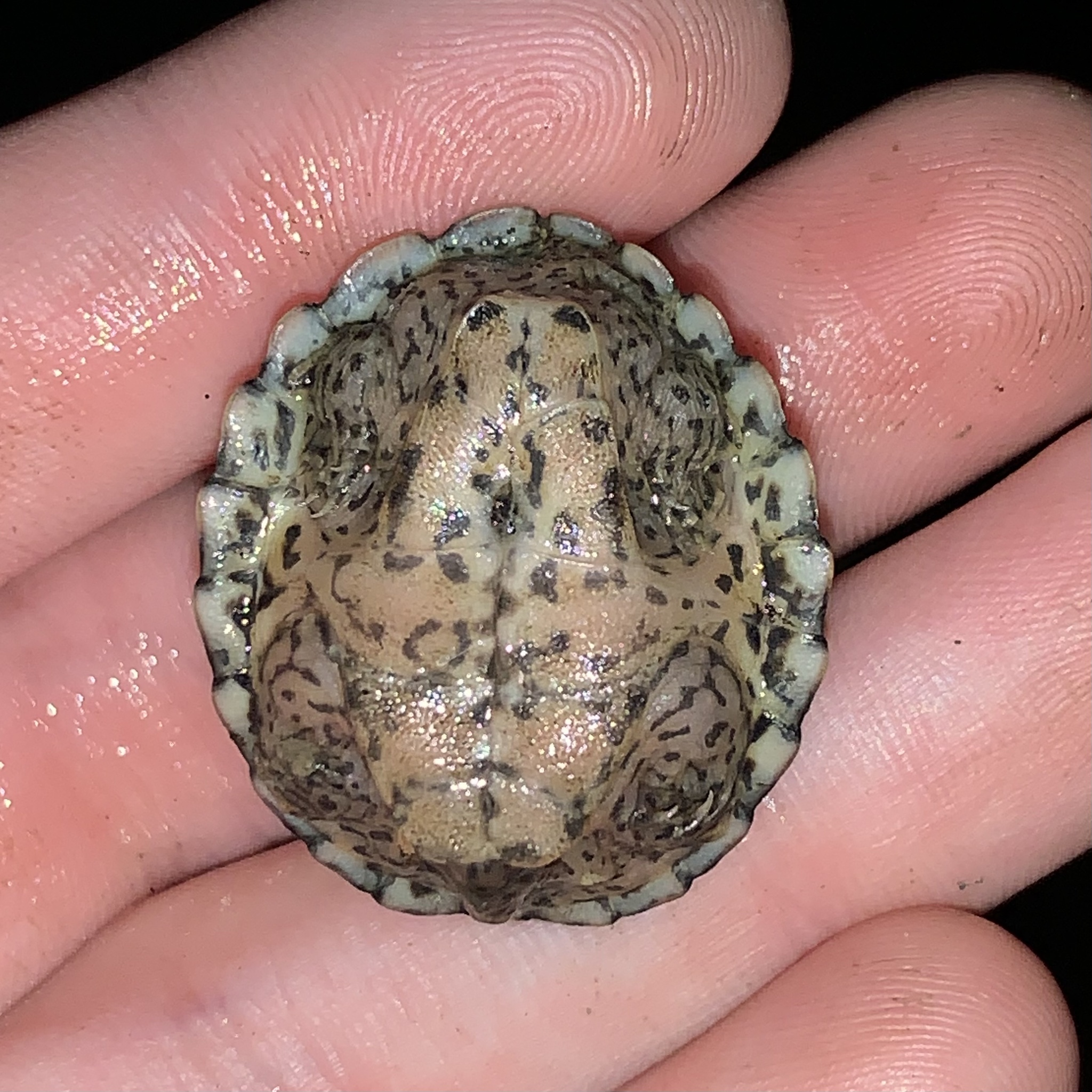
Hatchling, Texas

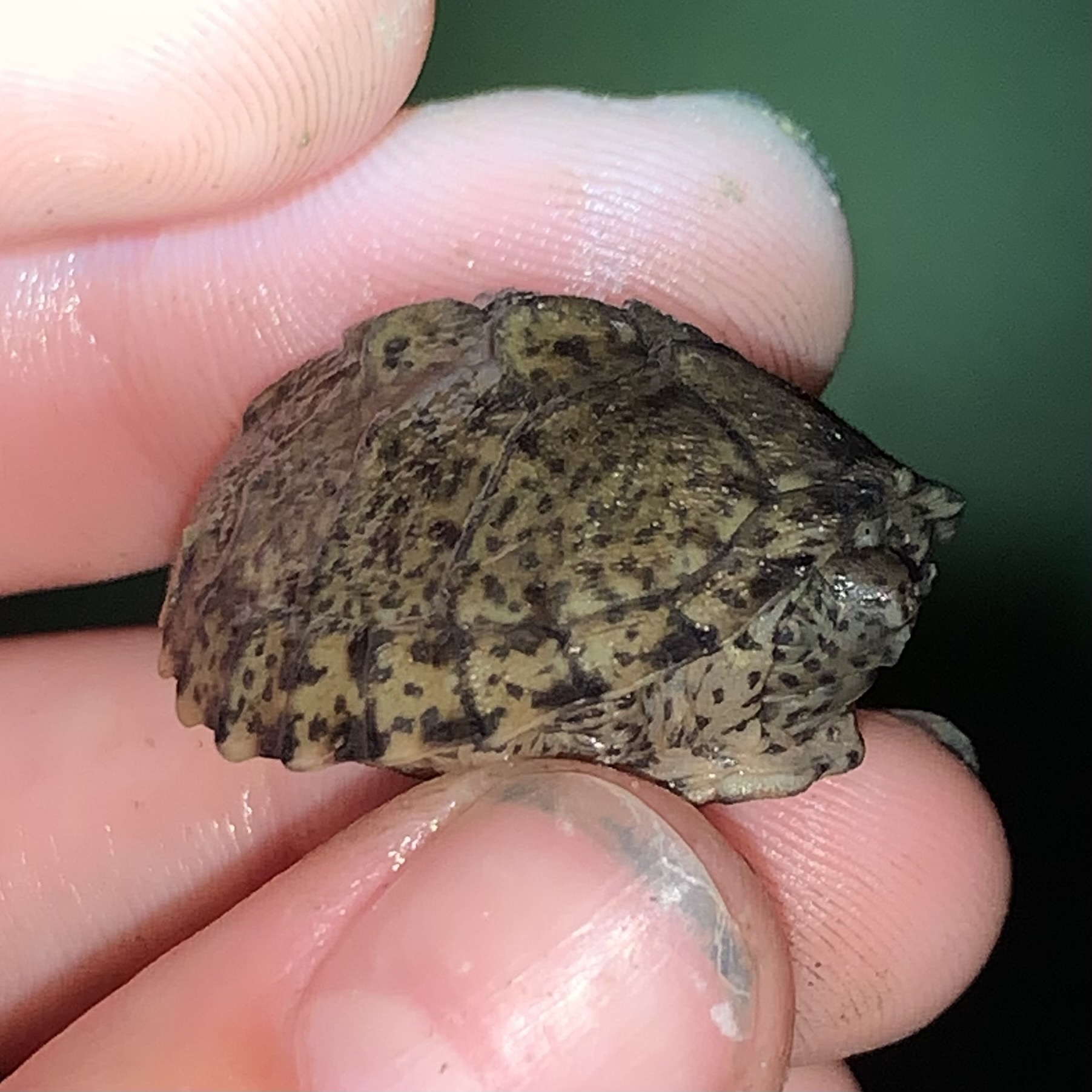
Hatchling, Texas

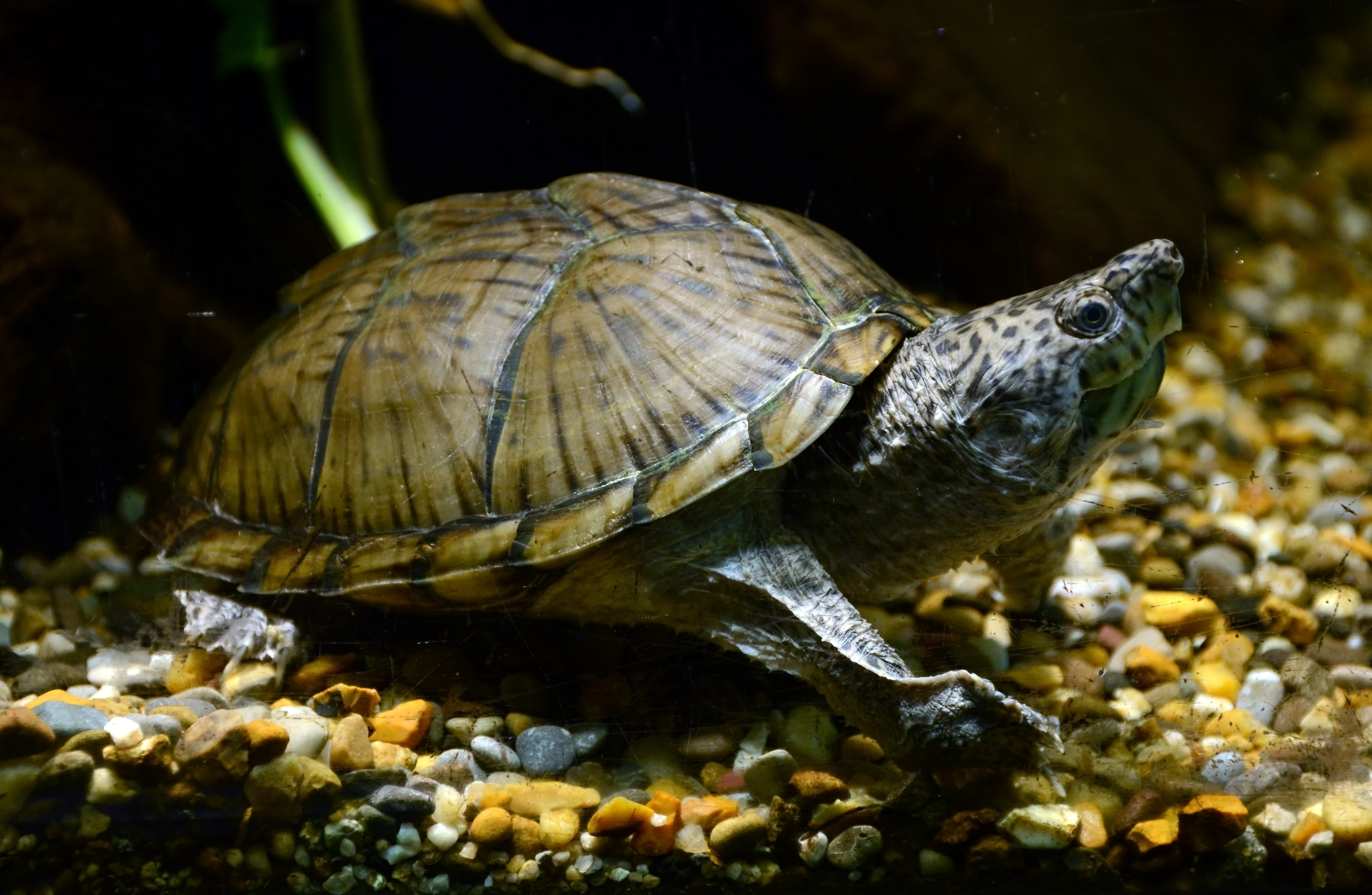
In captivity

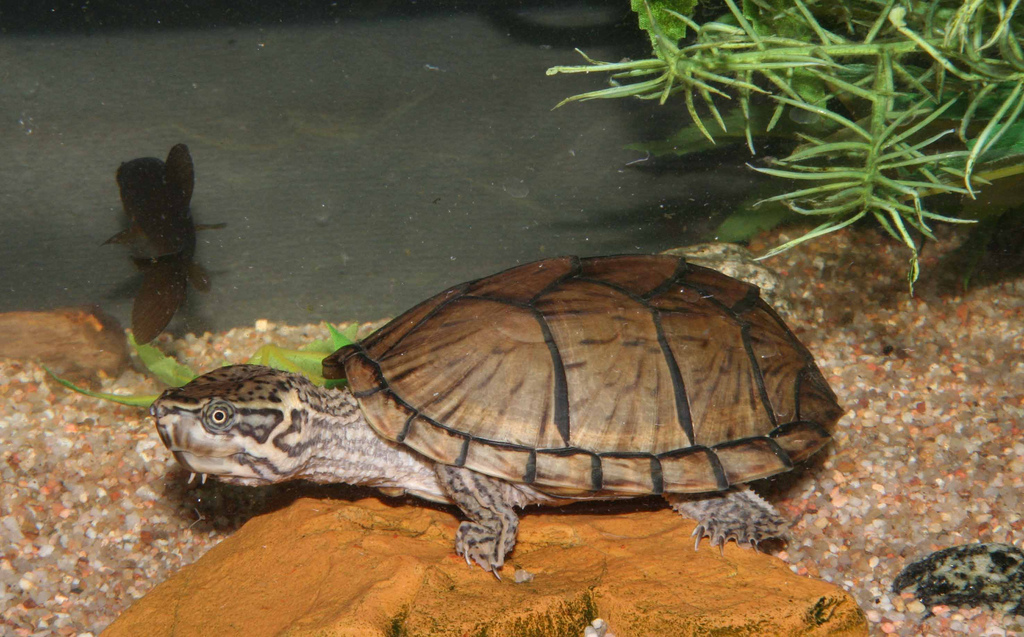
Hybrid with the eastern musk turtle
