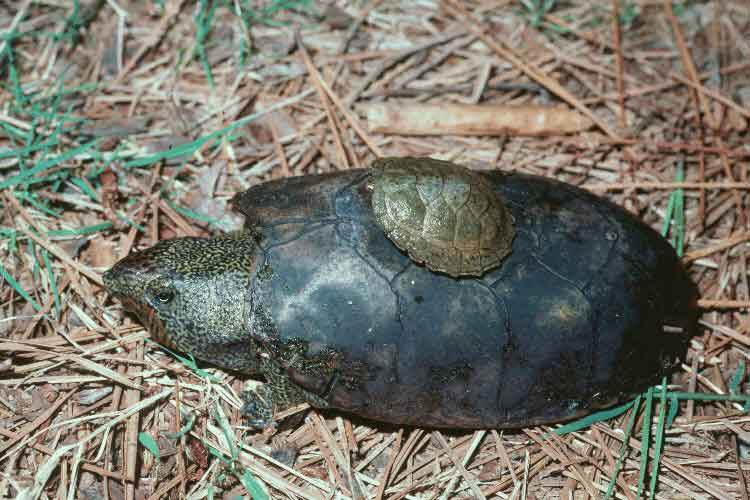
- Adult and hatchling

Conservation status
- Critically Endangered (IUCN 3.1)

- Threatened (ESA)

Scientific classification
- Kingdom: Animalia
- Phylum: Chordata
- Order: Testudines
- Suborder: Cryptodira
- Family: Kinosternidae
- Genus: Sternotherus
- Species: S. depressus

Binomial name
- Sternotherus depressus Tinkle & Webb, 1955
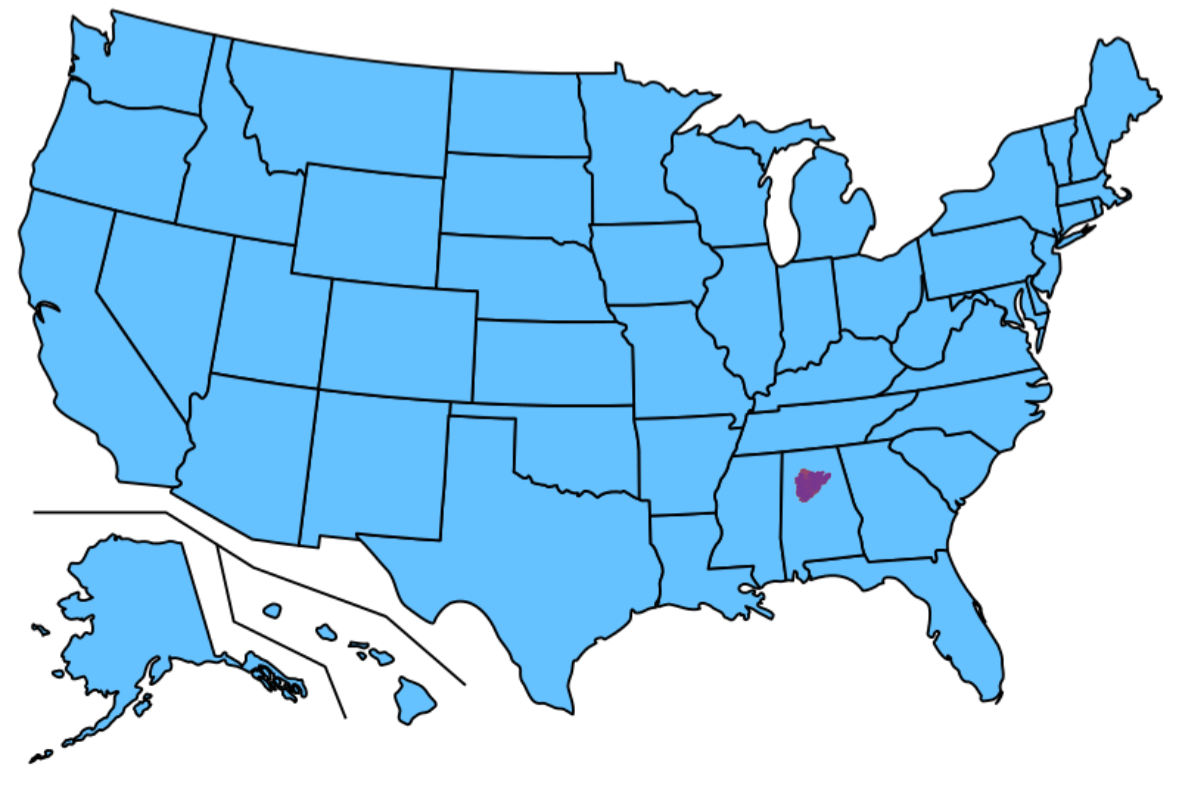
- The purple area on the map indicates where the flattened musk turtle is present

Synonyms
- List: Sternotherus depressus Tinkle & Webb, 1955; Sternothaerus depressus — Tinkle, 1958; Sternotherus minor depressus — Wermuth & Mertens, 1961; Kinosternon depressum — Iverson, Ernst, Gotte & Lovich, 1989; Kinosternon depressus — Welch, 1994

= Flattened musk turtle =

Species of turtle

The flattened musk turtle (Sternotherus depressus) is a critically endangered species of freshwater turtle in the family Kinosternidae. The species is endemic to north-central Alabama.

== Geographic range ==
S. depressus is an endemic with a restricted range, historically inhabiting the Black Warrior River drainage of north central Alabama. Serious declines have been observed throughout its range, and it has likely been extirpated from greater than 70% of its historic range, especially in much of the Mulberry Fork and the Locust Fork of the upper Black Warrior River Basin. Sipsey Fork populations have fared significantly better due to protection offered by the Bankhead National Forest.

== Description ==
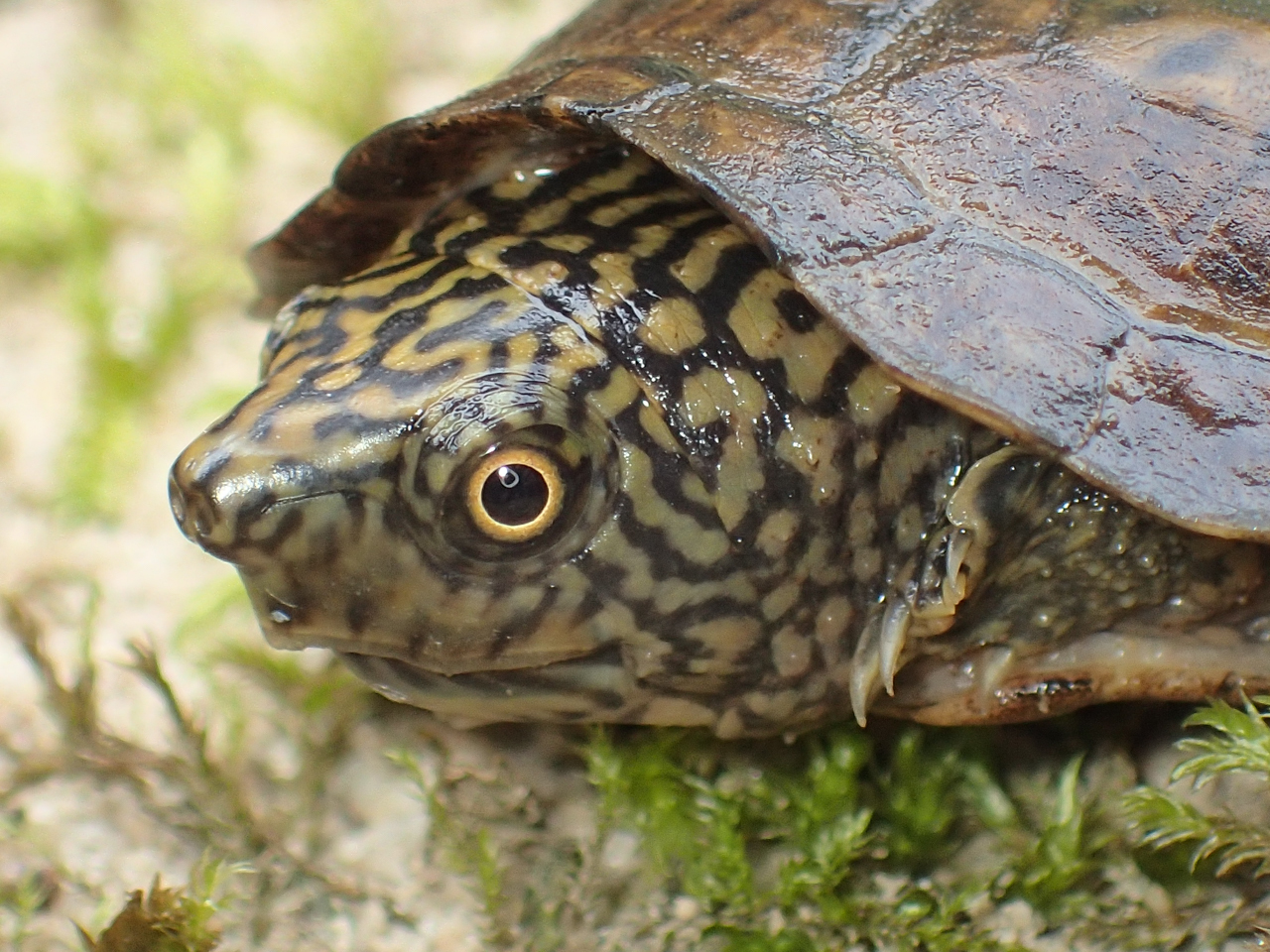
Young turtle, Alabama

A small turtle, S. depressus can have a straight carapace length of 7.5–10 cm (3.0–3.9 in) as an adult, with a record length of 11.4 cm (4 1/2 in).

Both the common name and specific name refer to the fact that the species' carapace (upper shell) is much lower and flatter than those of the other members of the genus Sternotherus. In fact the flattened musk turtle looks as if someone had accidentally stepped on it, hence the common name.

== Habitat ==
The flattened musk turtle is a freshwater, stream-dwelling turtle. The ideal habitat for the flattened musk turtle is a clearwater stream or river that has an adequate amount of cover sites to escape to under rocks and crevices. The shape of the flattened musk turtle allows it to fit into confined spaces, such as crevices. In absence of quality cover in rocks and crevices, the flattened musk turtle will dig under logs or brush. Juveniles will often be found in weed beds in shallow water.

== Diet ==
S. depressus are omnivorous and mostly rely on gastropods (snails) and pelecypods (mussels) as a large part of their diet. Crayfish, insects, and seeds are also consumed by S. depressus, but are not a main food item. A greater portion of snails were detected in the feces of denser populations of S. depressus.

== Behavior and Movement ==
S. depressus has an average home range of 332 meters, although home ranges as large as a kilometer were recorded. In areas of poorer habitat, it is possible that S. depressus may have to move more to fulfill its dietary needs. Light and moderate precipitation was correlated with more overall movement for S. depressus, but not overall activity (i.e. amount of time active during the day). The breeding and nesting season showed more overall activity and movement compared to the brumation season for S. depressus.

Basking has been observed in S. depressus on rocks, trees, and logs, although it is thought to be related to disease or overall poor health.

== Captivity ==
Individuals of S. depressus have survived for more than 20 years in captivity. Although reproductive rates are low for the species, S. depressus has been bred infrequently in captivity with relative success. Future propagation efforts may be key to preserving and reintroducing the species once its habitat has been restored.

== Threats and causes of decline ==
The flattened musk turtle is primarily threatened by habitat alteration and habitat destruction. Strip mining for coal has increased the amount of silt and particulates in the waters of the Warrior River drainage system. S. depressus relies on rock crevices to escape predation, which are easily filled in from silt and sediment. Increased siltation in the streams also decreases the food availability for S. depressus as mollusk populations decrease. Sewage and other forms of pollution from urban areas near the Warrior Basin have also had an effect on stream biota. Secondary threats to the flattened musk turtle are illegal collection for the pet trade and disease.

Habitat fragmentation also poses a significant threat to S. depressus. Isolated populations have the potential to lose genetic viability and threaten normal population structure. Smaller isolated populations also have less resilience to human caused disturbance, and thus are more vulnerable.

== Gallery ==
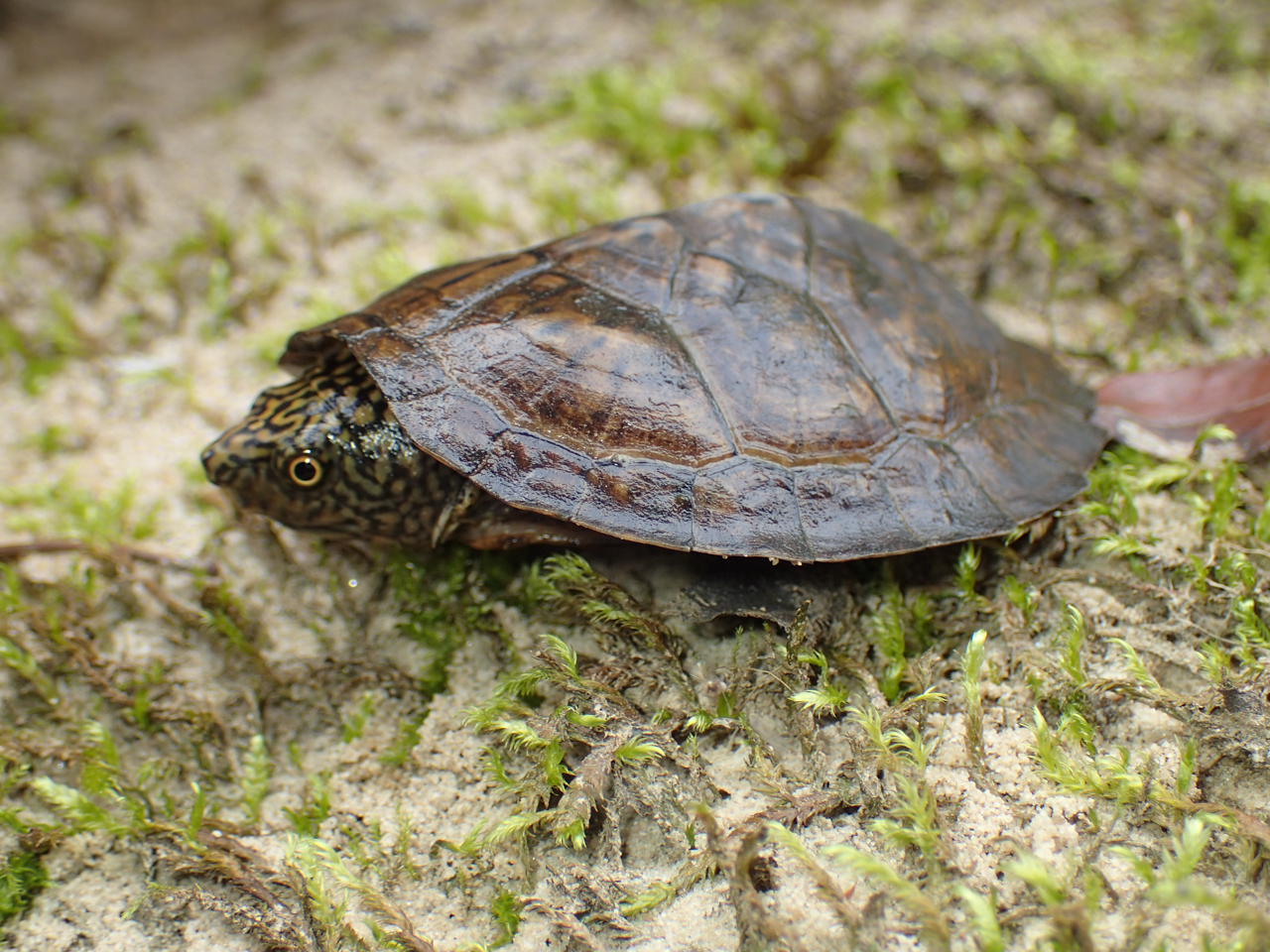
Young turtle

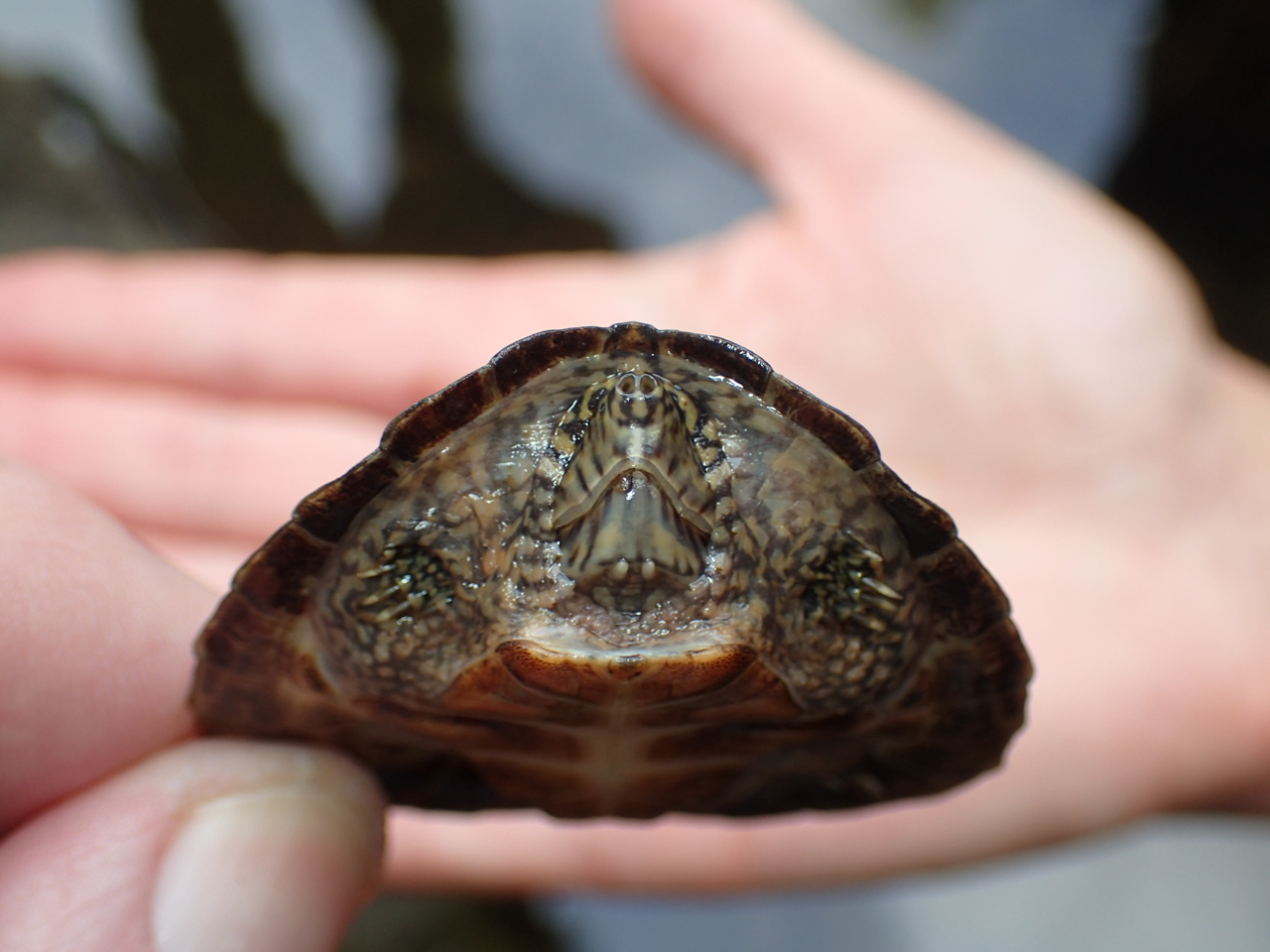
Young turtle

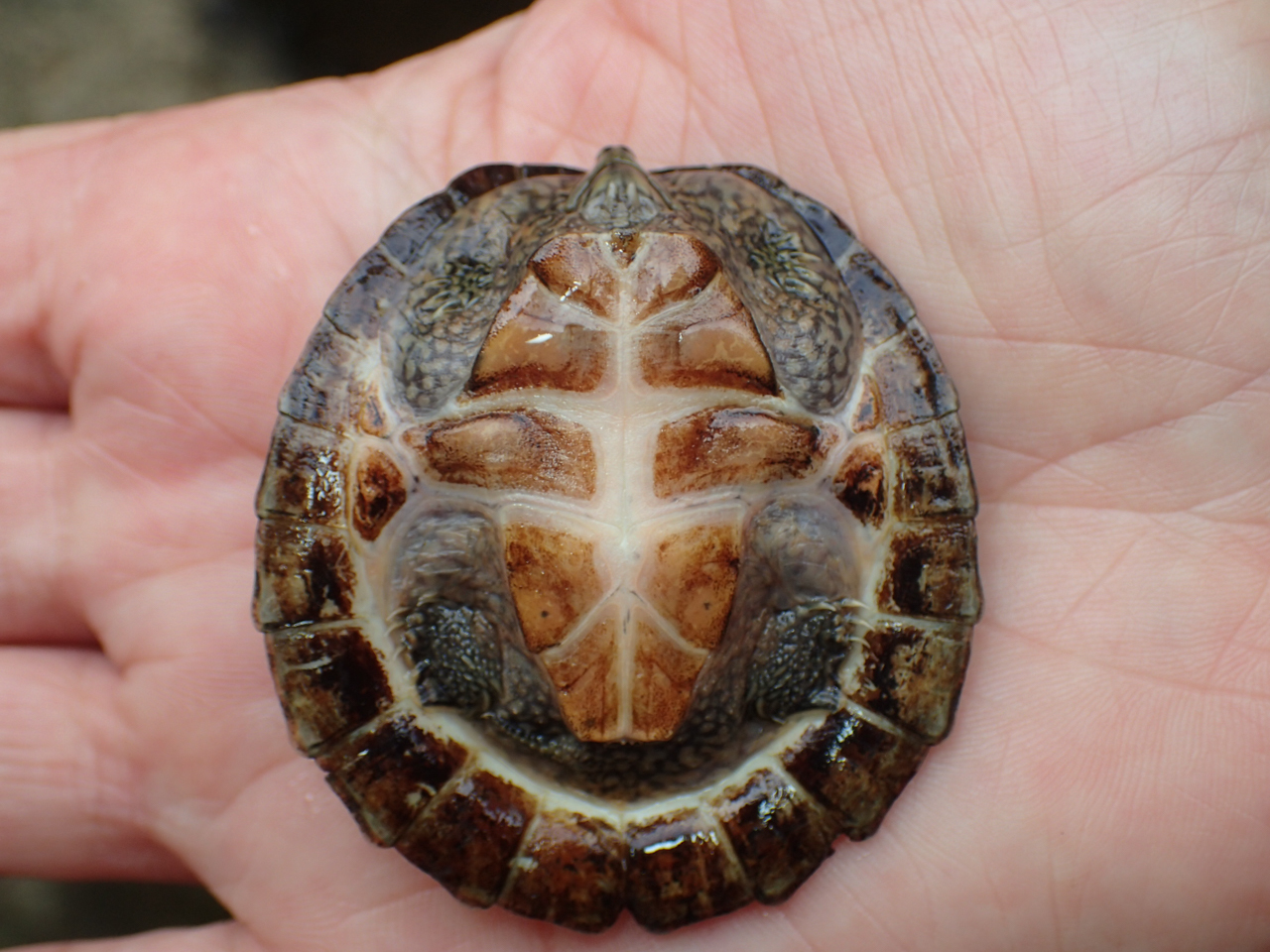
Young plastron

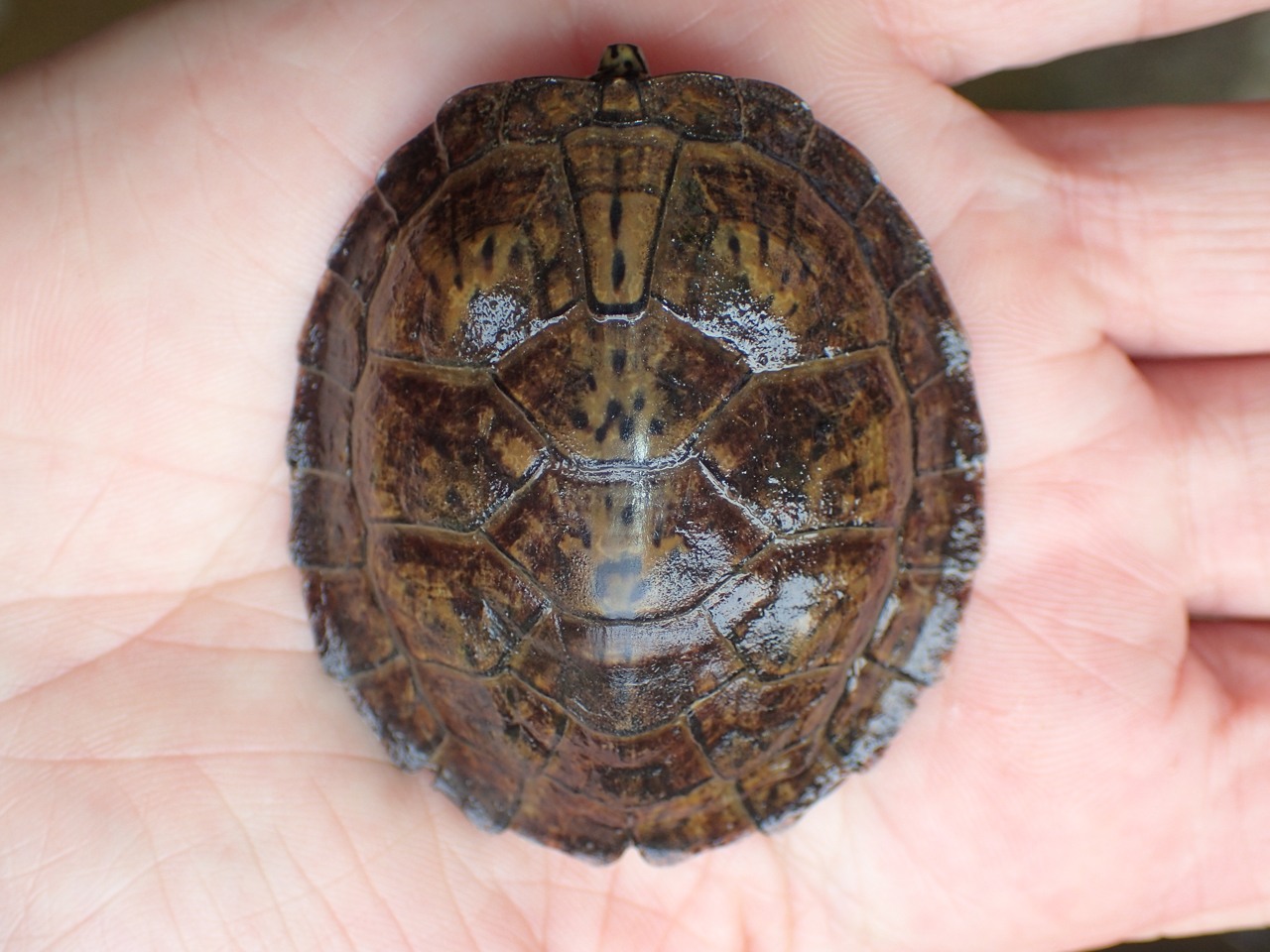
Young carapace
