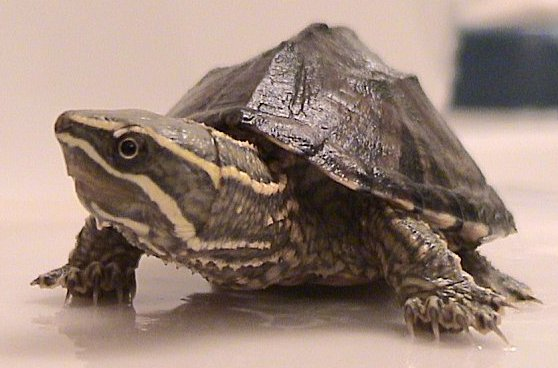
- Sternotherus odoratus stinkpot or common musk turtle

Scientific classification
- Kingdom: Animalia
- Phylum: Chordata
- Class: Reptilia
- Order: Testudines
- Suborder: Cryptodira
- Family: Kinosternidae
- Subfamily: Kinosterninae; Agassiz, 1857

Genera
- Kinosternon; Sternotherus

= Kinosterninae =

Subfamily of turtles

Kinosterninae is a subfamily of the family Kinosternidae, a family of aquatic turtles. Kinosterninae contains the genera Kinosternon and Sternotherus, which are native to much of the United States and northern Mexico. There are 27 species from 4 genera in the two subfamilies Staurotypinae and Kinosterninae.

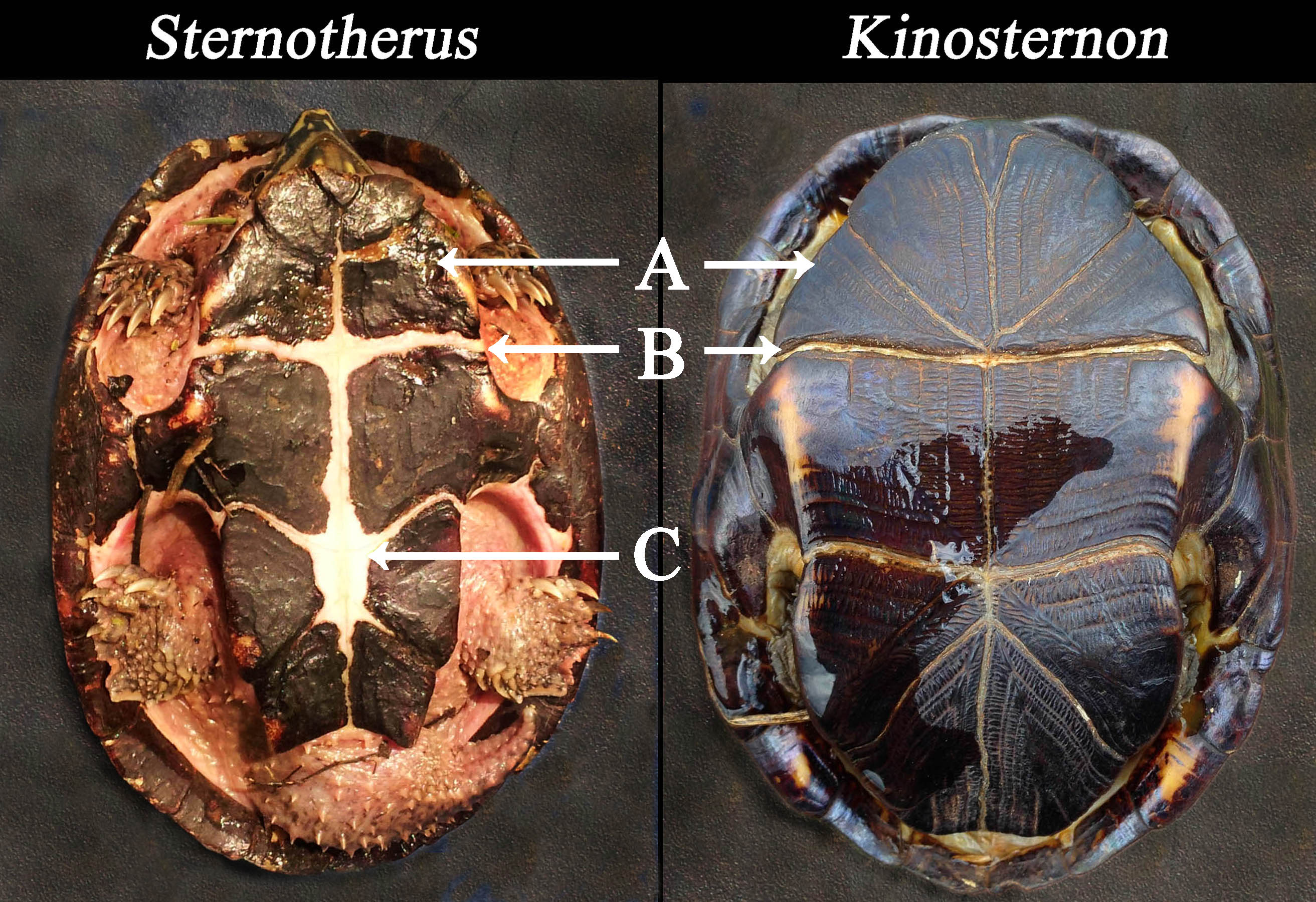
Comparison between the plastrons of Sternotherus and Kinosternon
