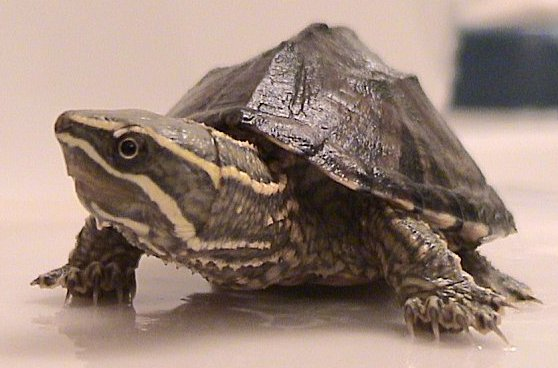
- Hatchling Sternotherus odoratus (eastern musk turtle)

Scientific classification
- Kingdom: Animalia
- Phylum: Chordata
- Class: Reptilia
- Order: Testudines
- Suborder: Cryptodira
- Family: Kinosternidae
- Subfamily: Kinosterninae
- Genus: Sternotherus; Bell in Gray, 1825

Species
- 6 extant, 1 extinct., see text

= Sternotherus =

Genus of turtles

Sternotherus is a genus of turtles in the family Kinosternidae including six species commonly known as musk turtles. The genus is endemic to North America, occurring in the eastern third of the US and southeast Ontario, Canada. Musk glands positioned near the bridge of the shell can produce foul smelling secretions when the turtles are threatened, although gentle handling does not normally provoke a response. Sternotherus are moderately small turtles, with the largest species in the genus, the razor-backed musk turtle (S. carinatus), attaining a maximum of 17.6 cm. in shell length. The carapace is characteristically oval and domed (an exception being the flattened musk turtle, S. depressus), with most species having one or three keels on the back which may become smoother and obscure with age in some species. Musk turtles are generally drab in color, mostly black, gray, brown, olive, or ocher, which aid in camouflaging them in their natural habitats. The head is relatively large and stout, marked with spots, streaks, or strips. The plastron has only 10 or 11 scutes, as opposed to 12, a more common condition in North American turtles. The tail is short, with males having a horny claw like tip.

Sternotherus are largely aquatic, however some species frequently bask on fallen logs or rocks emerging from the water, and eastern musk turtles (S. odoratus) occasionally leave the water to forage. Sternotherus are omnivorous and opportunistic generalist in their diet, although inclining toward being carnivorous, with mollusks (gastropods and bivalves) and insects making up a significant percentage of their diet. Some older adults develop large musculature on the head and expanded, crushing jaw surfaces aiding in the consumption of mollusk. Musk turtles are oviparous with females producing one to six clutches a year. The typical clutch size is two to four eggs, although clutches may range from one to 13. The sex of the hatchlings is determined by the incubation temperature. The eggs are deposited in shallow nest excavated on the banks or in woodlands a few meters from the water. Eggs may be laid singly, or in groups, and some species are known to share communal nesting areas.

== Etymology ==
The generic name Sternotherus is Greek meaning hinged breast or chest, referring to the hinged plastron. The trivial names, or specific epithets include: carinatus – Latin for keeled in reference to the shape of the carapace; depressus – Latin for pressed down or low also referring to the shape of the carapace; intermedius – Latin for intermediate, historically believed to be a hybrid from between S. minor and S. peltifer; minor – Latin referencing its relatively small size compared to S. carinatus; odoratus – Latin for having an odor, referring the smell of the musk produced by its scent glands; peltifer – Latin meaning bearing a small shield, in reference to the small size of the scutes on the bridge the species.

== Taxonomy ==
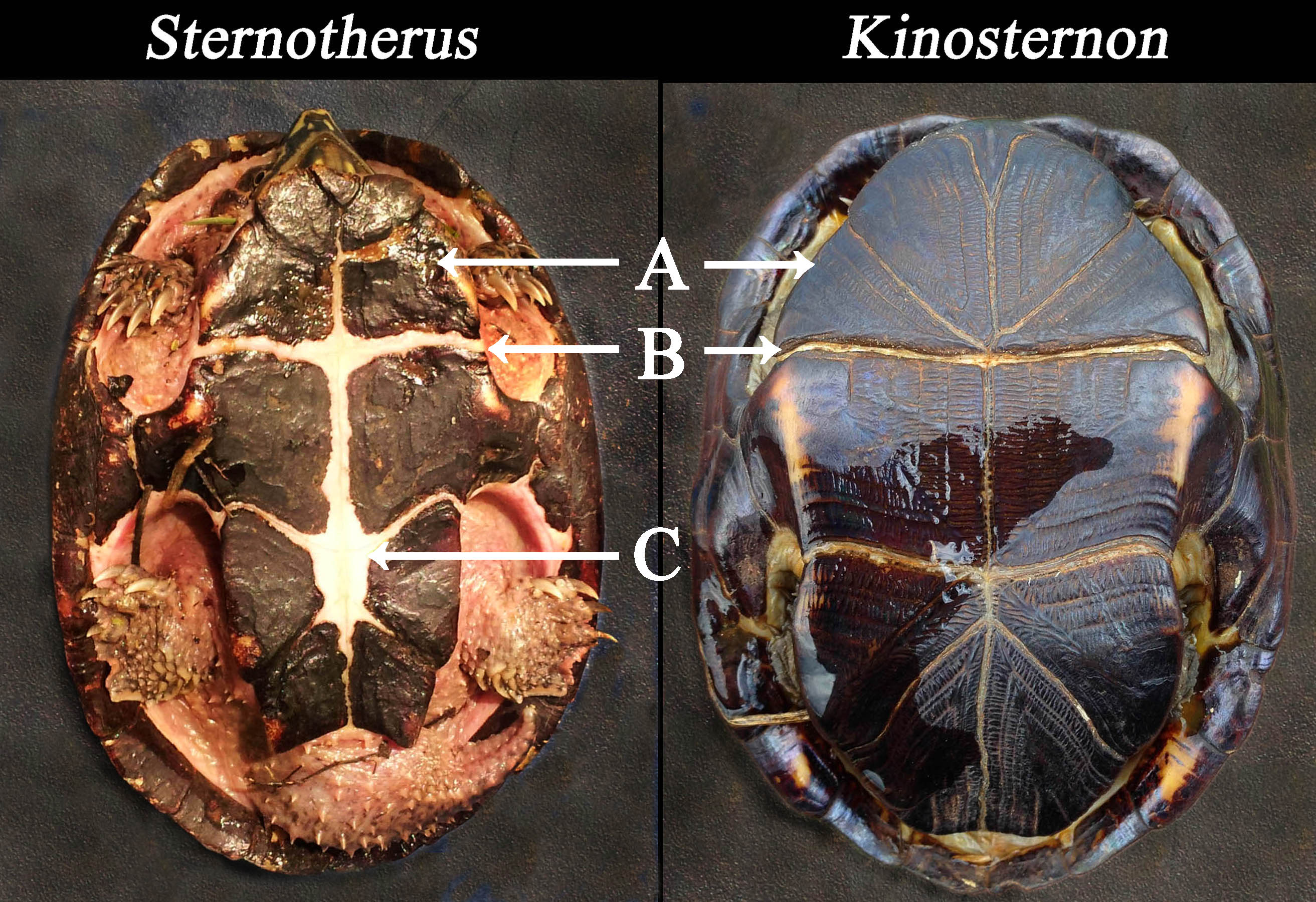
Distinguishing characteristics between musk turtles (Sternotherus) and the closely related mud turtles (Kinosternon) include a smaller plastron with legs exposed vs. a large plastron with legs concealed and: A, pectoral scute squarish vs. triangular; B, hinges less developed vs. well developed; C, skin between plastron scutes.

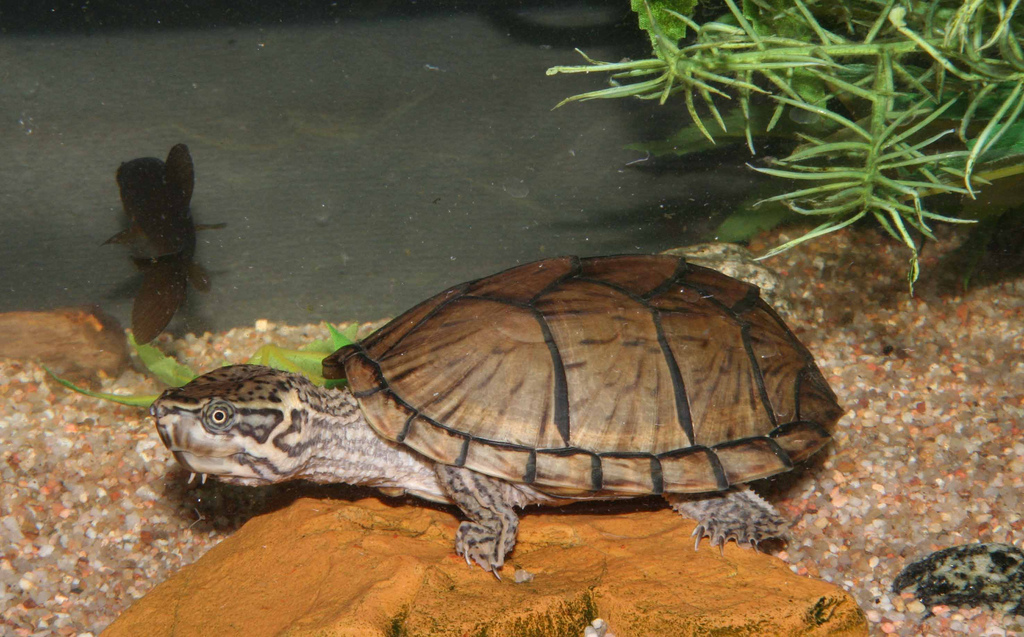
S. odoratus x S. carinatus hybrid

Sternotherus is one of four genera in the family Kinosternidae including: narrow-bridged musk turtles (Claudius), American mud turtles (Kinosternon), giant musk turtles (Staurotypus), and musk turtles (Sternotherus). Sternotherus are closely related, similar in appearance, and sympatric in much of their range with some species of mud turtles (Kinosternon), and the two genera constitute the subfamily Kinosterninae within the family Kinosternidae. In the past some taxonomist placed Sternotherus in the synonymy of the genus Kinosternon but they are generally regarded as two separate genera with six species currently (2022) recognized in the genus Sternotherus.

Sternotherus Bell, 1825 – musk turtles
Extant Species	Common name	Image
Sternotherus carinatus (Gray, 1855)	razor-backed musk turtle	
Sternotherus depressus Tinkle & Webb, 1955	flattened musk turtle	
Sternotherus intermedius Scott, Glenn & Rissler, 2018	intermediate musk turtle	
Sternotherus minor (Agassiz, 1857)	loggerhead musk turtle	
Sternotherus odoratus (Latreille, 1801)	eastern musk turtle	
Sternotherus peltifer (H.M. Smith & Glass, 1947)	stripeneck musk turtle	

Fossil species

- †Sternotherus palaeodorus (Bourque & Schubert, 2015) (known from Miocene—Pliocene fossil remains)

Nota bene: A binomial authority in parentheses indicates that the species was originally described in a genus other than Sternotherus.

== Description ==
Turtles in the genus Sternotherus are very similar to the American mud turtles in the genus Kinosternon, but tend to have a more domed carapace, with a distinctive keel down the center of it. Sternotherus odoratus typically grows to only 8–14 cm (3.1–5.5 in) in straight carapace length at full maturity, with females often being larger than males.

== Distribution ==
Distribution of the eastern musk turtle (S. odoratus), the other species in the genus occur within southern areas of its range

The genus Sternotherus is endemic to North America. It occurs in the approximant eastern third of the US and extreme southeast Ontario, Canada. The eastern musk turtle (S. odoratus), the most wide-ranging species of the genus, occurs in southern Maine, south to Florida, west into eastern Texas, Oklahoma, and Kansas, and north to southeast Wisconsin, southern Michigan, and the Great Lakes region of southern Ontario. It is generally absent from higher elevations in the Appalachian Mountains.

The other species in the genus largely occur within the southern regions of the eastern musk turtle's range. Two species have relatively limited distributions, the flattened musk turtle (S. depressus) is endemic to north-central Alabama in the Black Warrior River basin above the fall line, and the intermediate musk turtle (S. intermedius) is found in southeastern Alabama and adjacent areas of the Florida panhandle in the Choctawhatchee, Conecuh, Yellow, Pea, Blackwater, and Escambia rivers. The razor-backed musk turtle (S. carinatus) occurs throughout Louisiana, and neighboring areas of Mississippi, Arkansas, Oklahoma, and Texas. The loggerhead musk turtle (S. minor) is found in extreme southeast Alabama, Georgia, and northern Florida. The stripe-necked musk turtle (S. peltifer) predominantly occurs in Alabama and Mississippi with some peripheral records from Georgia, and Louisiana, and ranging into northern watersheds in eastern Tennessee with marginal records from North Carolina, and Virginia.

== Diet ==
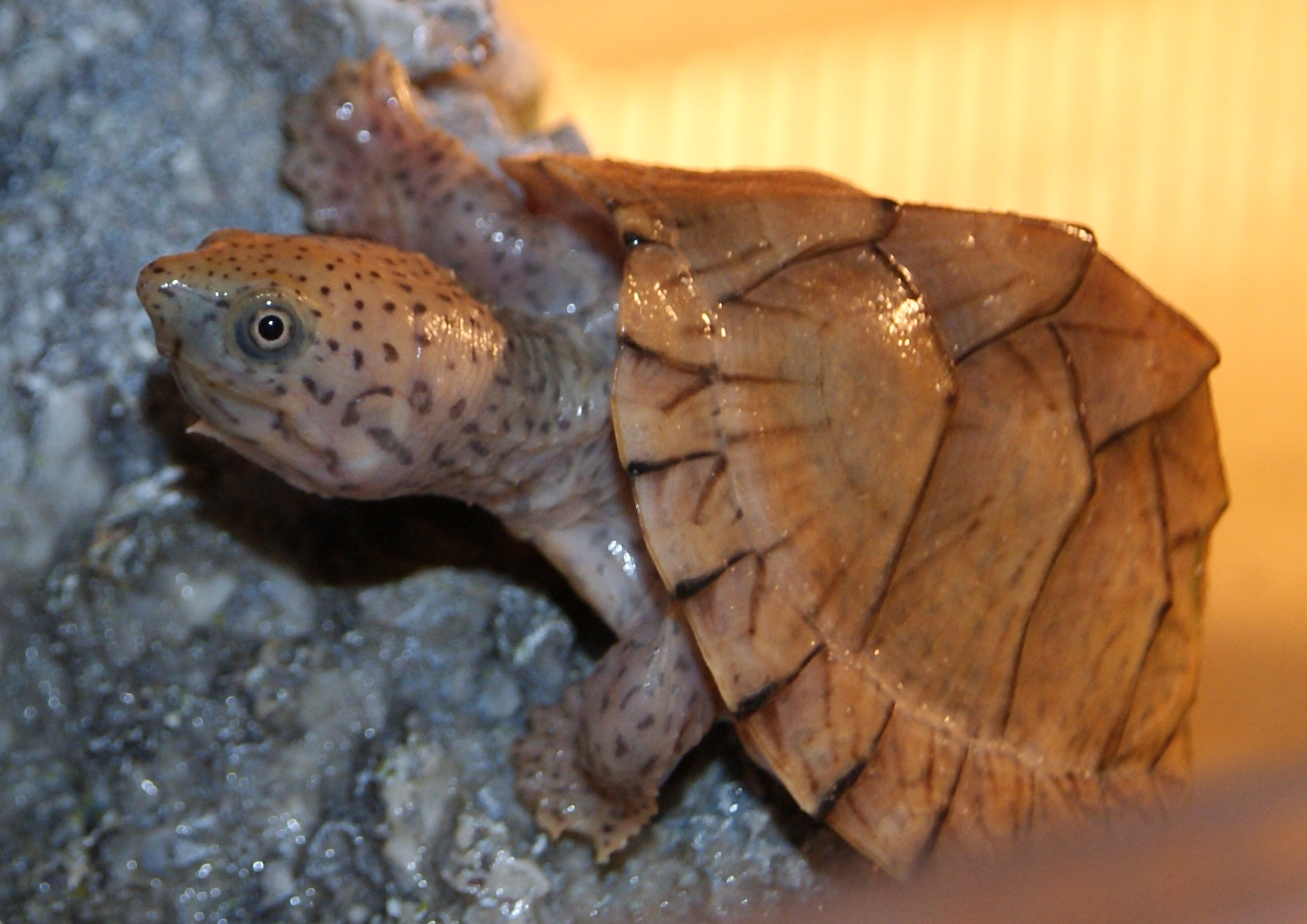
Razor-backed musk turtle (S. carinatus) captive hatchling

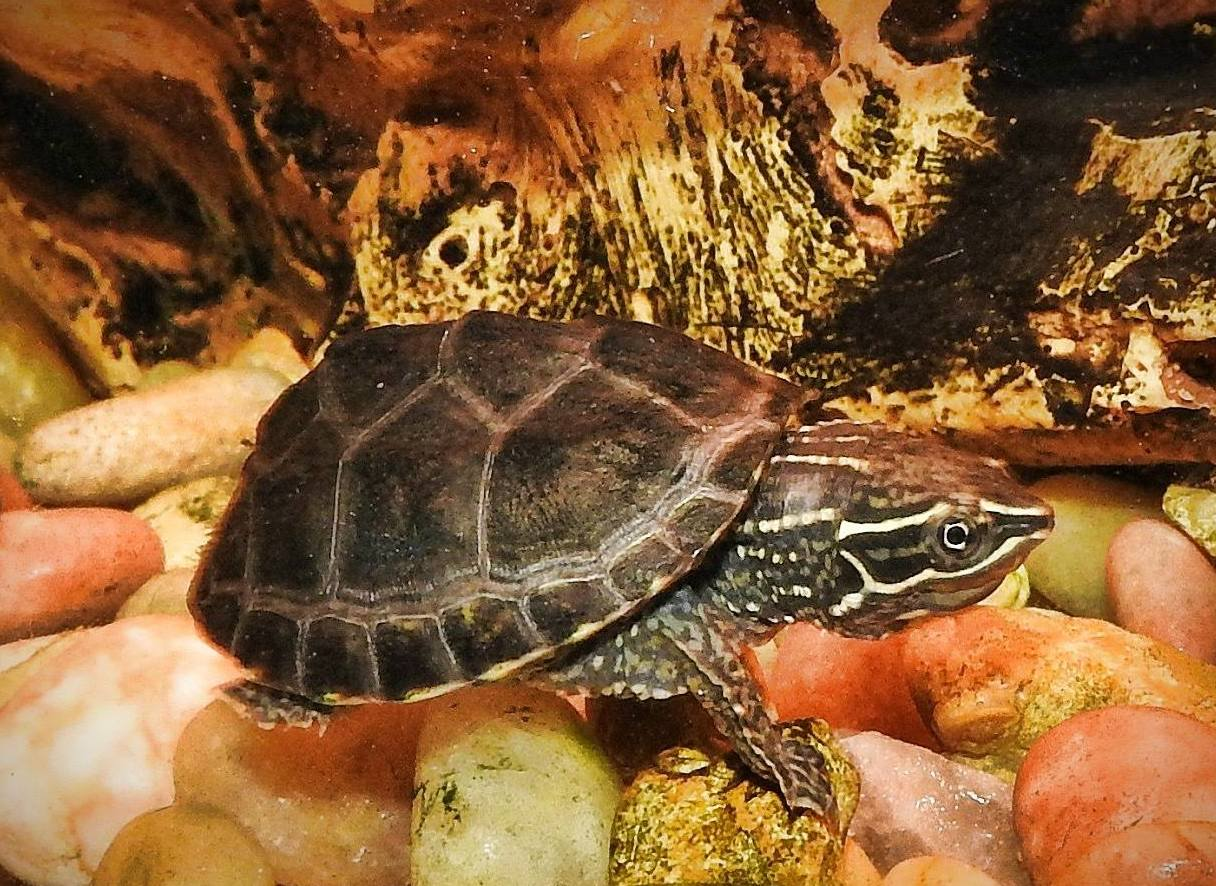
Eastern musk turtle (S. odoratus), captive hatchling

Sternotherus are omnivorous. The loggerhead (S. minor) and stripe-necked musk turtle (S. peltifer) have been described as opportunistic generalist tending toward carnivory. Mollusk make up a significant portion of the diet in all species, particularly adults. Juveniles and sub-adults (under 5 cm.) feed on a higher percentage of aquatic insects, algae, and carrion. An ontogenetic change in diet occurs and adults shift to an omnivorous diet with a high percentage of mollusk. Food items include mollusks (gastropods and bivalves), insects (including larva, adults, aquatic and terrestrial), crustaceans (crayfish and crabs), worms (earthworms and leeches), amphibians (tadpoles and small frogs), carrion, filamantous green algae, parts of vascular plants and seeds (e.g. Prunus, Sambucus, Ulmus, Podostemum). Some novel and less common documented food items include spiders, millipedes, small fish and fish eggs, isopods, and small turtles. The flattened musk turtle (S. depressus) is known to feed on introduced Asian clams (Corbicula maniliensis).

The razor-backed (S. carinatus) and eastern musk turtles (S. odoratus) are known to be bottom feeders, often searching with the neck extended and probing the mud and sand with their heads. Olfaction is probably important in the location and selection of food items. However, musk turtles occasionally feed at the surface and are also known to eat out of the water. Eastern musk turtles (S. odoratus) have occasionally been observed leaving the water at dusk to feed on slugs on land. Some larger adults develop hypertrophied head musculature and expanded crushing surfaces on both the upper and lower jaws that aid in eating mollusk. One study concluded razor-backed (S. carinatus) and eastern musk turtles (S. odoratus) were "euryphagous with food preferences directly related to the availability of food." Another study found the diet of the eastern musk turtle (S. odoratus) varied seasonally and males ate more insects and females more snails. Digestive turnover rates, from ingestion to defecation, of 49 hours (S. odoratus) to 57 hours (S. minor, S. peltifer) have been reported, although temperatures may influence these times.

== Habitat ==
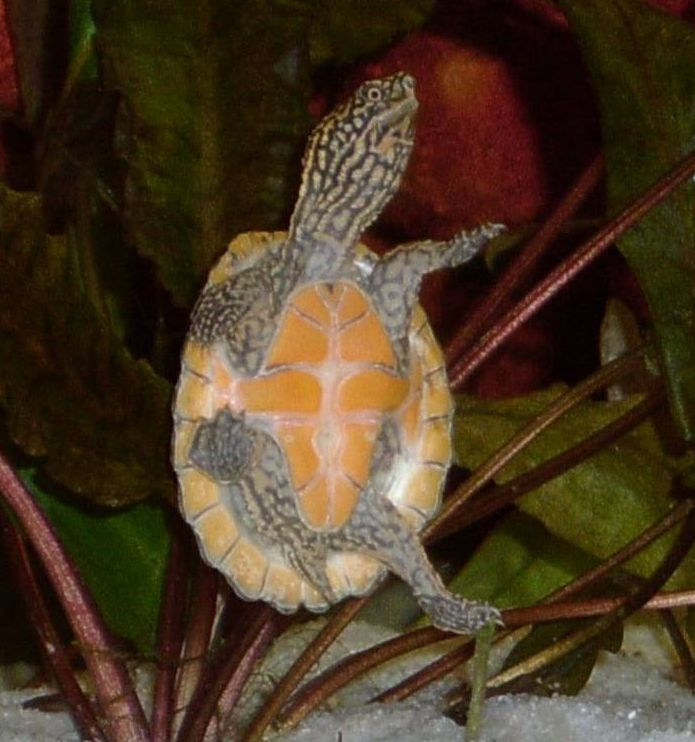
Stripeneck musk turtle (S. peltifer), captive hatchling

Sternotherus are largely aquatic, but some species bask frequently, and may occasionally leave the water to forage and lay eggs. Fallen logs and deadwood submerged and emerging from the water are important for shelter and basking sites for all species of Sternotherus. Habitat preferences varies among some species. The eastern musk turtle (S. odoratus) tends to be generalist and may occur in almost any body of water, as are loggerheads (S. minor) to a lesser extent, although water with slow or no currents, soft bottoms, and shelter in the form of logs and rocks are usually preferred over very deep water and swift currents. Eastern musk turtles have been found at depths of 9 meters but, shallower water (ca. 1 meter), are more typical. Brackish water is usually avoided. Depths of 0.5–1.5 meters are typical for loggerheads (S. minor), but they have been found at 13 meters. The razor-backed musk turtle (S. carinatus) favors the relatively deeper waters of rivers, creeks, bayous, and associated oxbow lakes, backwater swamps, and floodplains where slower currents and soft substrates are found. The stripe-necked musk turtle (S. peltifer) are lotic, preferring the currents of rivers and streams although they can be abundant in lakes and impoundments along these waterways as well. The flattened musk turtle (S. depressus) is an inhabitant of clear, rocky to sandy bottom creeks and streams above the fall line, typically 1.5 meters or less in depth, taking shelter under logs and rocks, or burrowing in the sand. The intermediate musk turtle (S. intermedius) was regarded as a hybrid between S m. minor and S. m. peltifer as recently as 2017, and few if any studies specifically examining the ecology of the species have been published (as of 2022).

In one ecological study of kinosternid turtles conducted over five years in Oklahoma, permanent bodies of lotic (moving) water in wooded areas such as large rivers and creeks were the favored habitats of both razor-backed (S. carinatus) and eastern musk turtles (S. odoratus), however, S. carinatus was generally found in deeper water. No sexual, age, or seasonal differences were observed in habitat selection other than juveniles preferred shallower water than adults. The two species were strictly aquatic and terrestrial migrations occurred only during the breeding season. When inactive, both specie hid under rocks, logs, and overhanging banks, but did not show the burrowing proclivities that Kinosternon did. Turtles were found in abundance in quiet waters where submerged and floating vegetation such as algae, Nasturtium, Polygonum, Myriophyllum, Najas, and Potamogeton formed in mats and provided food and suitable shelter. Light intensity, pH levels, and transparency of water were examined, although it was concluded they were probably not directly limiting factors for the turtles, but did affect the distribution of vegetation and prey which provided food for the turtles.

== Behavior ==
Sternotherus is a highly aquatic genus. But some species, like the common musk turtle, are known to bask on fallen trees and coarse woody debris on shorelines. The thermal activity range and annual activity period was longer for Sternothaerus than Kinosternon

== Gallery ==
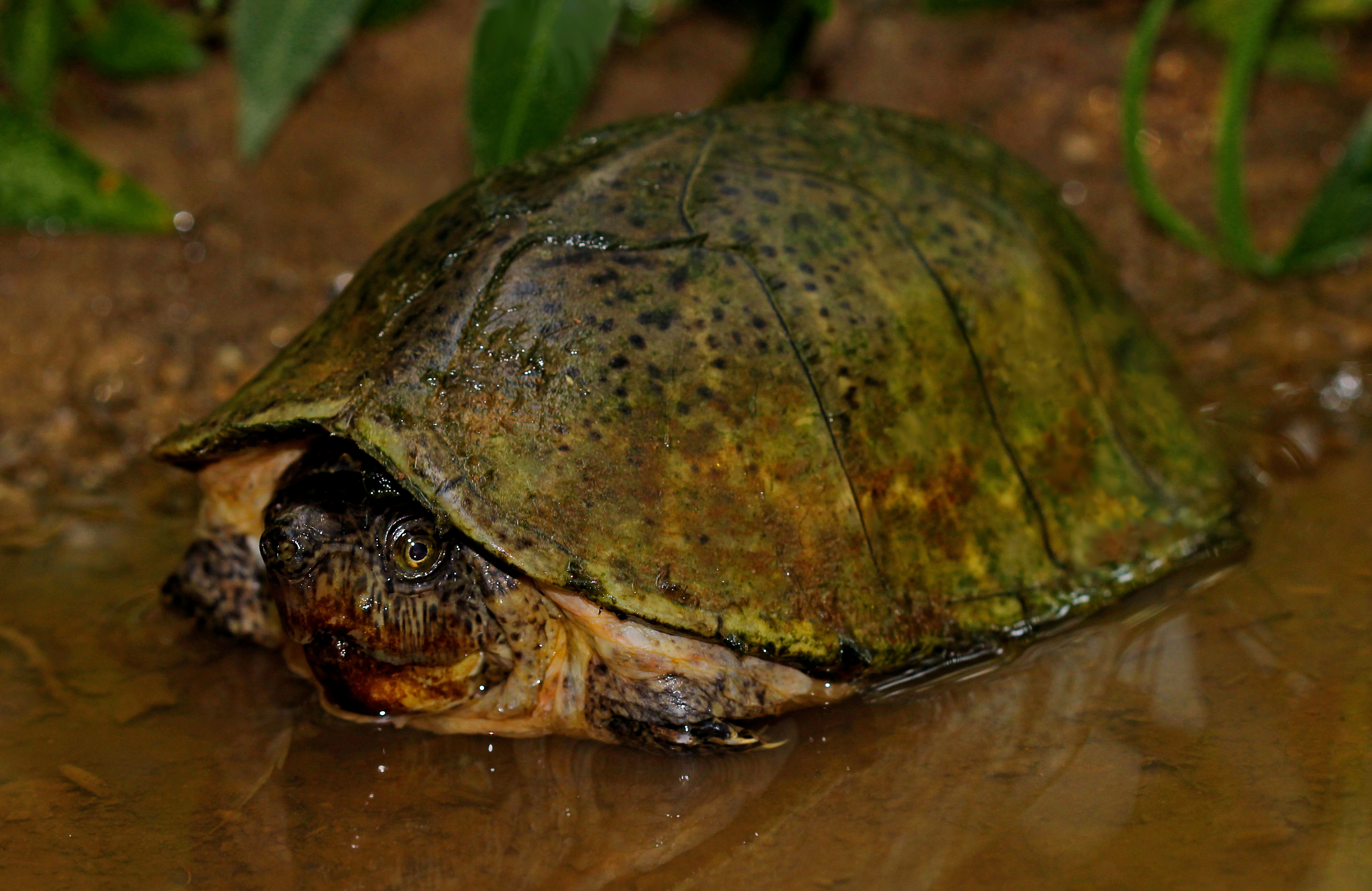
Razorback musk turtle (Sternotherus carinatus), Saline County, Arkansas (July 28, 2017)

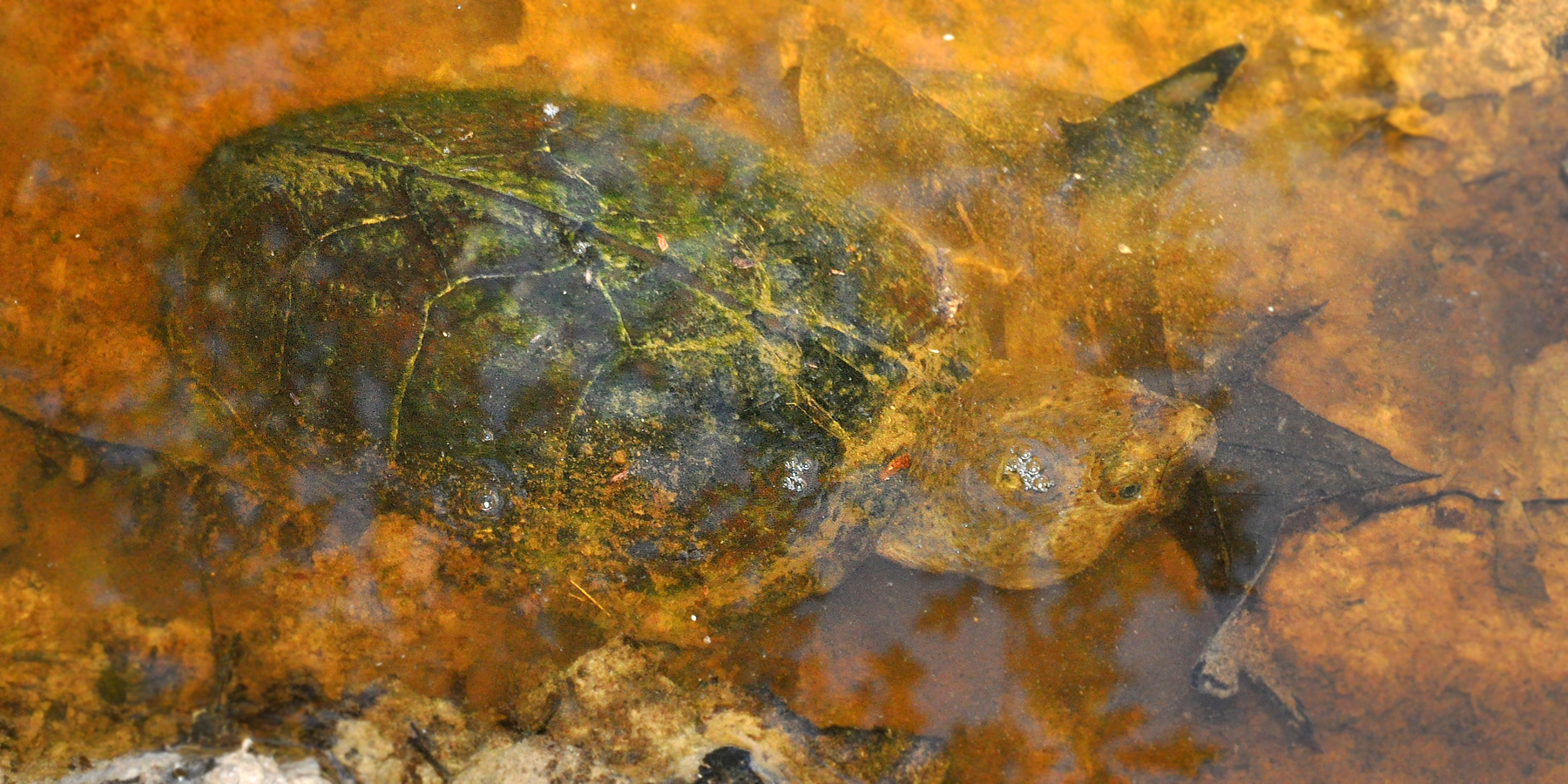
Razorback musk turtle (Sternotherus carinatus), in-situ, Hardin County, Texas (October 10, 2013)

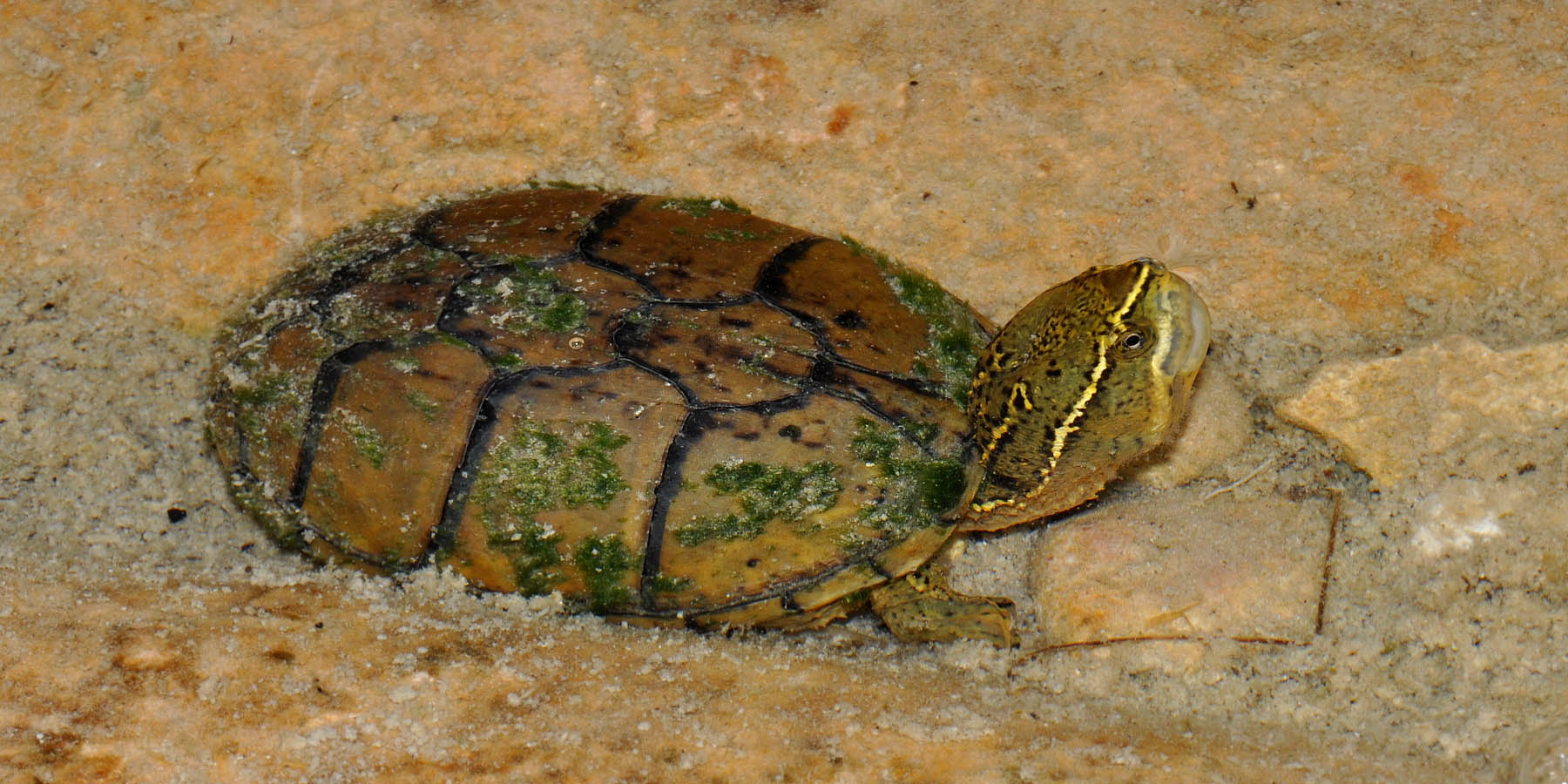
Eastern musk turtle (Sternotherus odoratus), in-situ, Kerr County, Texas (8 May 2014)
