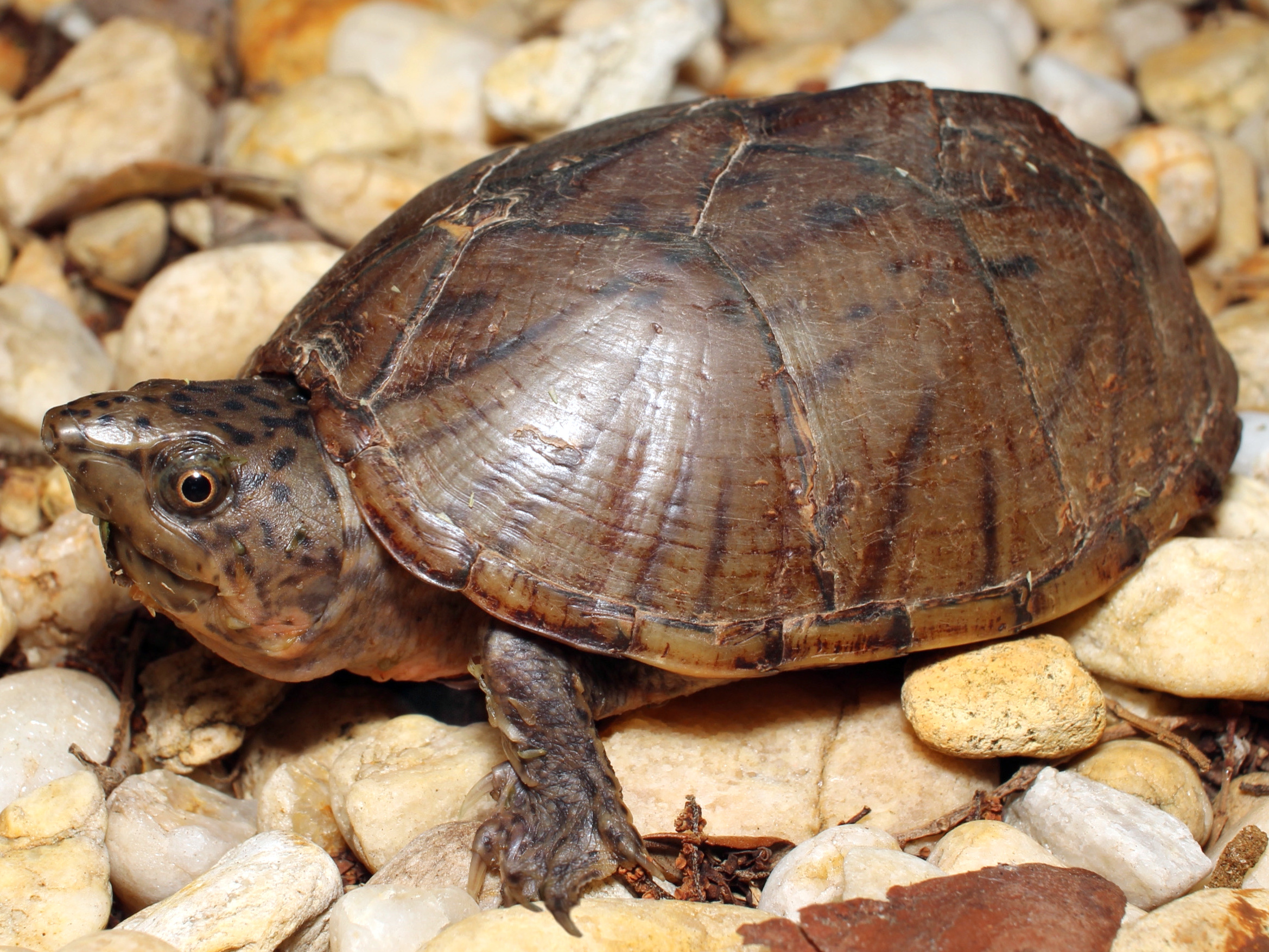
- This turtle was crawling along a riverbed.

Scientific classification
- Kingdom: Animalia
- Phylum: Chordata
- Class: Reptilia
- Order: Testudines
- Suborder: Cryptodira
- Family: Kinosternidae
- Genus: Sternotherus
- Species: S. intermedius

Binomial name
- Sternotherus intermedius Scott, Glenn & Rissler, 2017

= Intermediate musk turtle =

Species of turtle

Sternotherus intermedius is a species of small turtle native to Alabama, United States. It is also known as the aliflora musk turtle or intermediate musk turtle due to its intermediate patterns on the shell. For a long time, it was thought to be a hybrid between the two subspecies of the loggerhead musk turtle (the loggerhead and striped-neck musk turtle), but in 2017, it was declared a new species based on DNA research. It is endemic to the Choctawhatchee River and Conecuh River basins.
