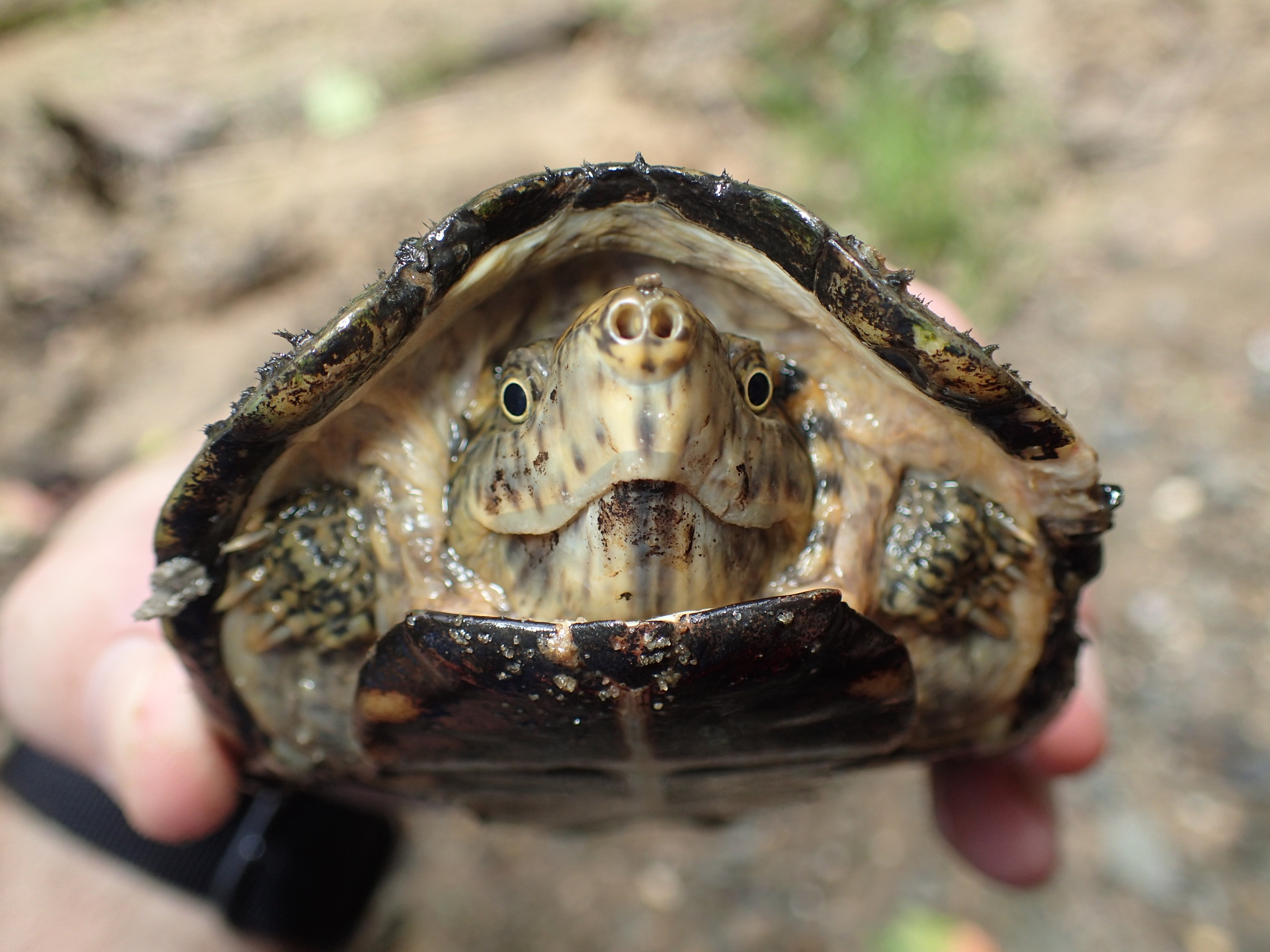
- In Alabama

Scientific classification
- Kingdom: Animalia
- Phylum: Chordata
- Class: Reptilia
- Order: Testudines
- Suborder: Cryptodira
- Family: Kinosternidae
- Genus: Sternotherus
- Species: S. peltifer

Binomial name
- Sternotherus peltifer (H.M. Smith & Glass, 1947)

= Stripeneck musk turtle =

Species of turtle

The stripeneck musk turtle (Sternotherus peltifer) is a species of turtle in the family Kinosternidae from the southeastern United States.

== Distribution ==
Alabama, Georgia, Kentucky, Louisiana, Mississippi, Tennessee, Virginia, and North Carolina.

== Gallery ==
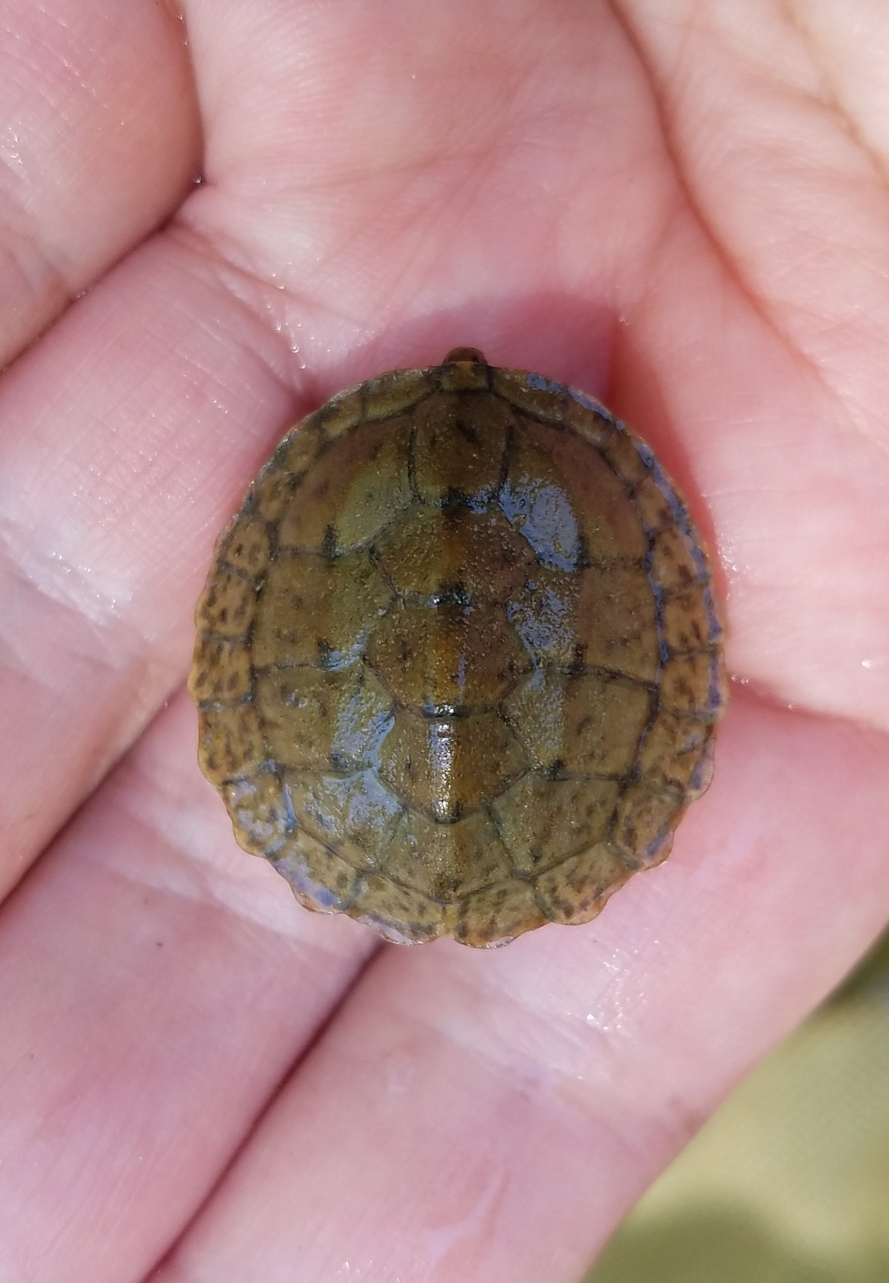
Juvenile carapace, Georgia

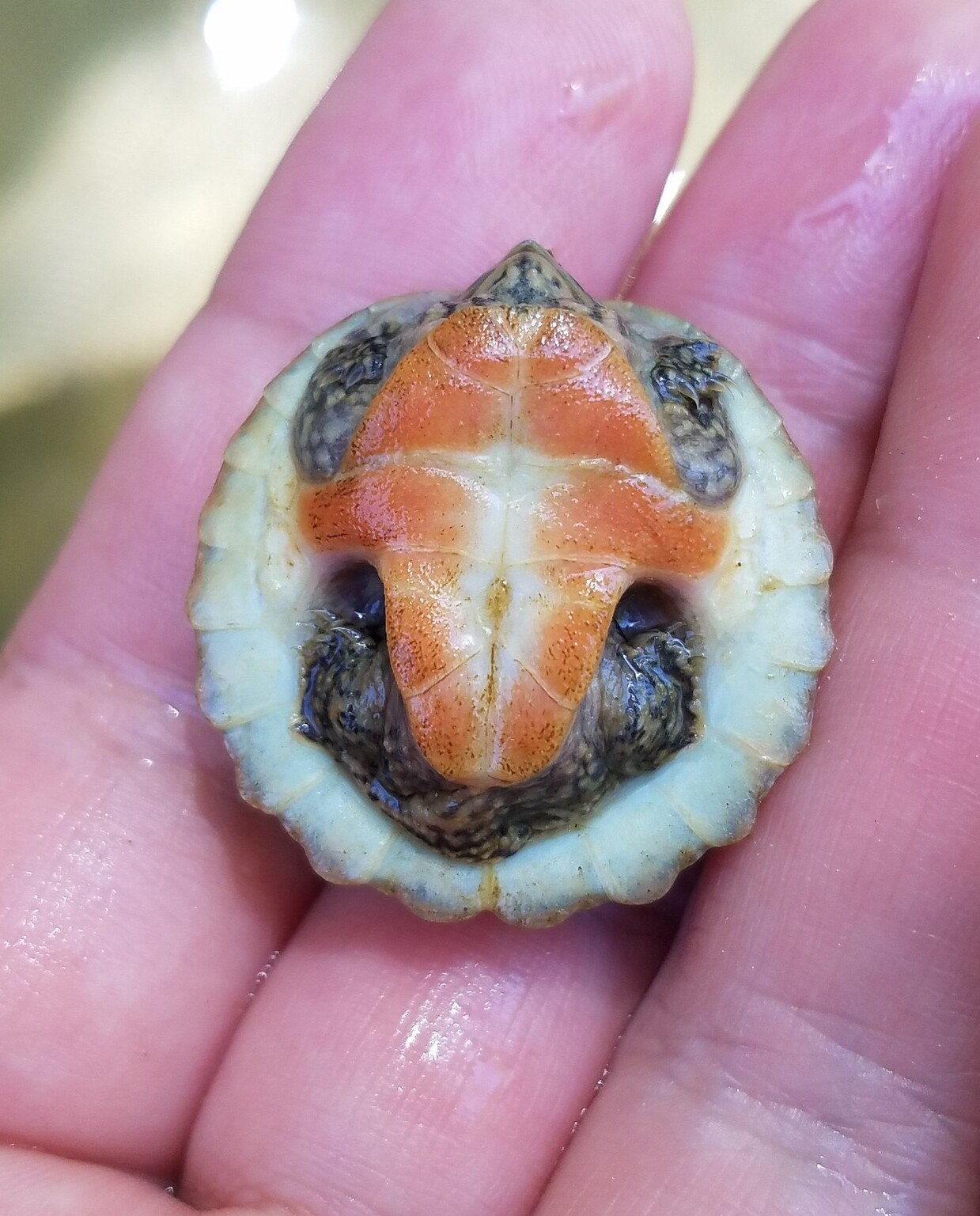
Juvenile plastron, Georgia

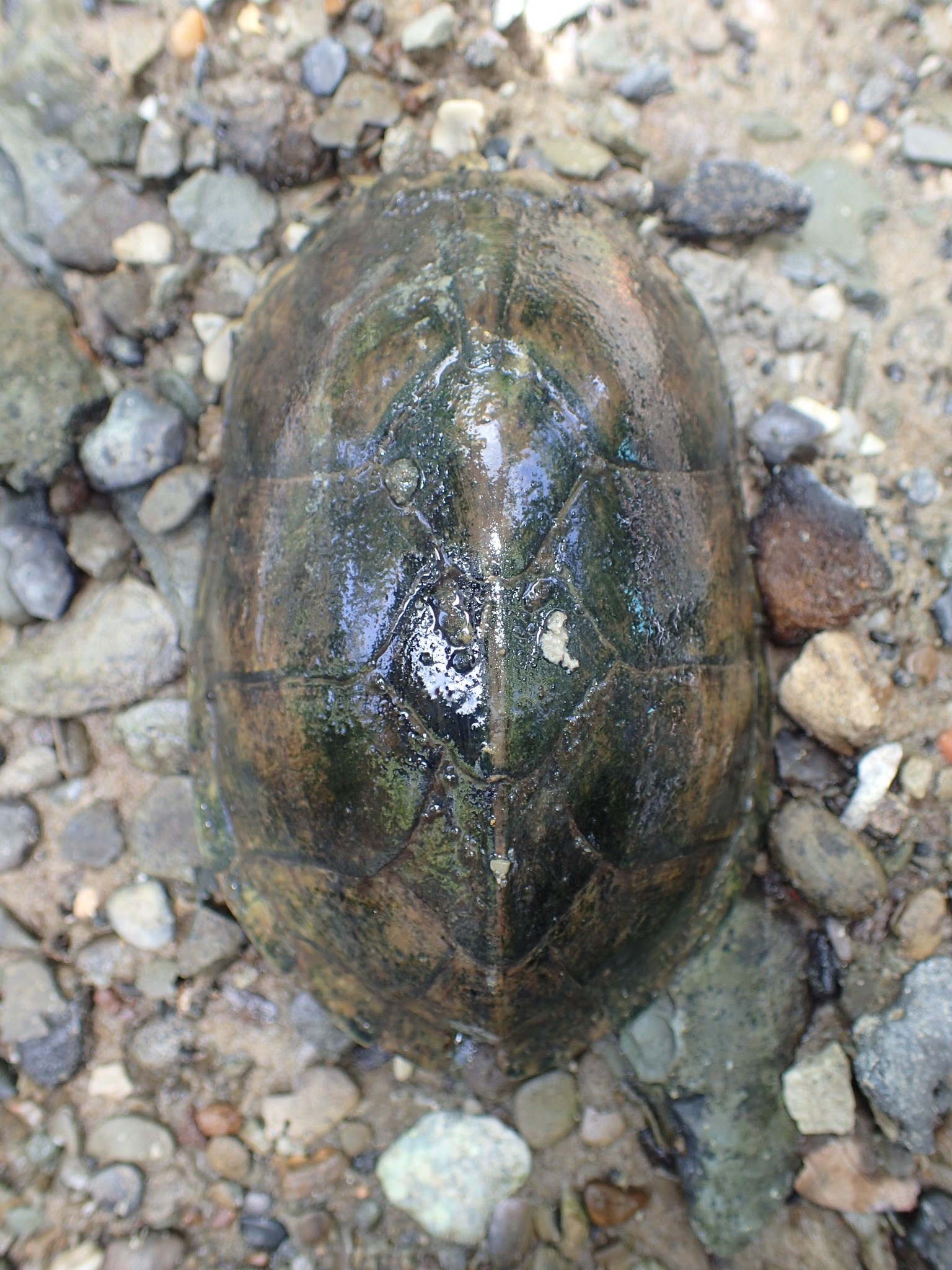
Adult carapace, Alabama

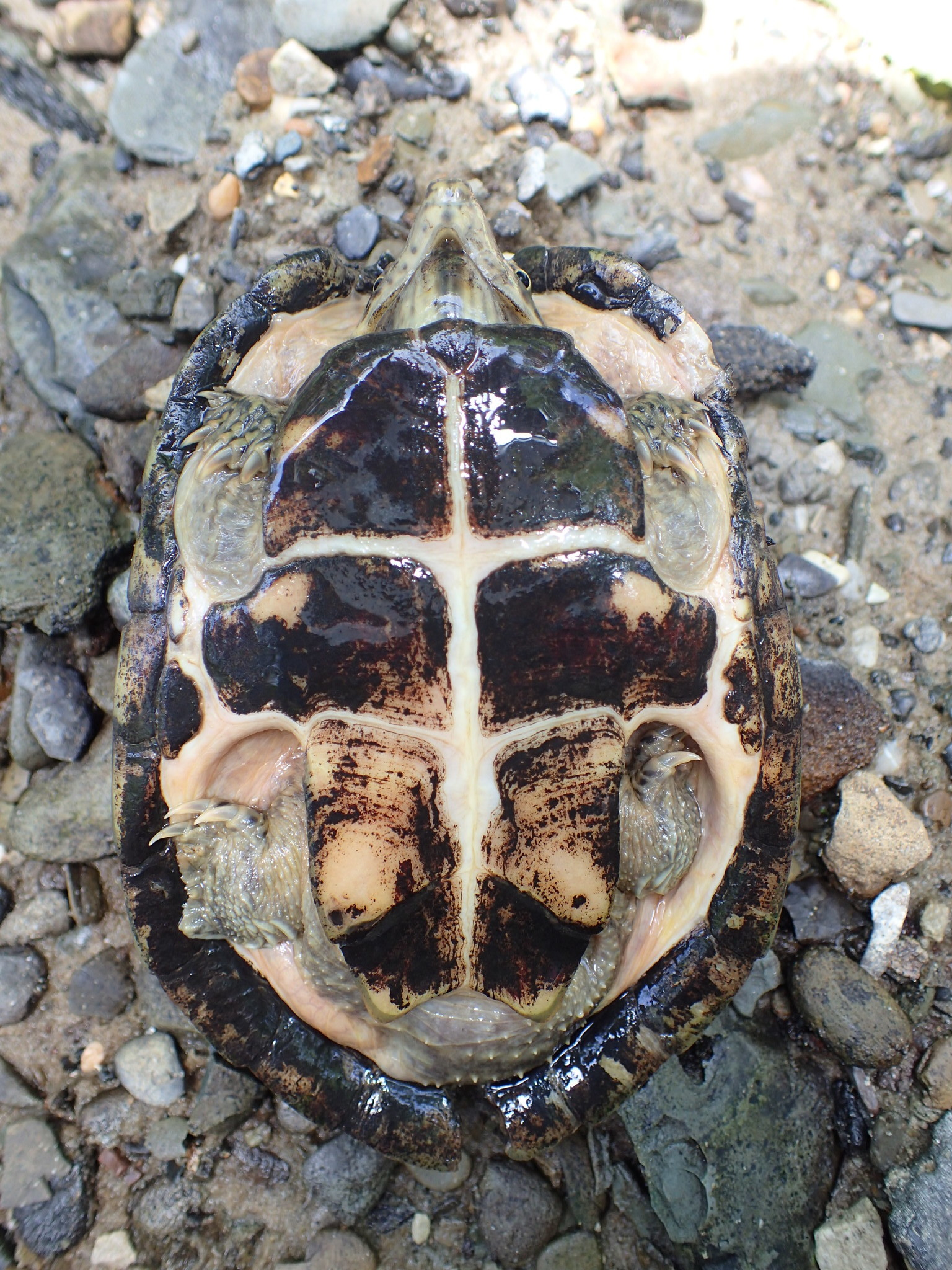
Adult plastron, Alabama

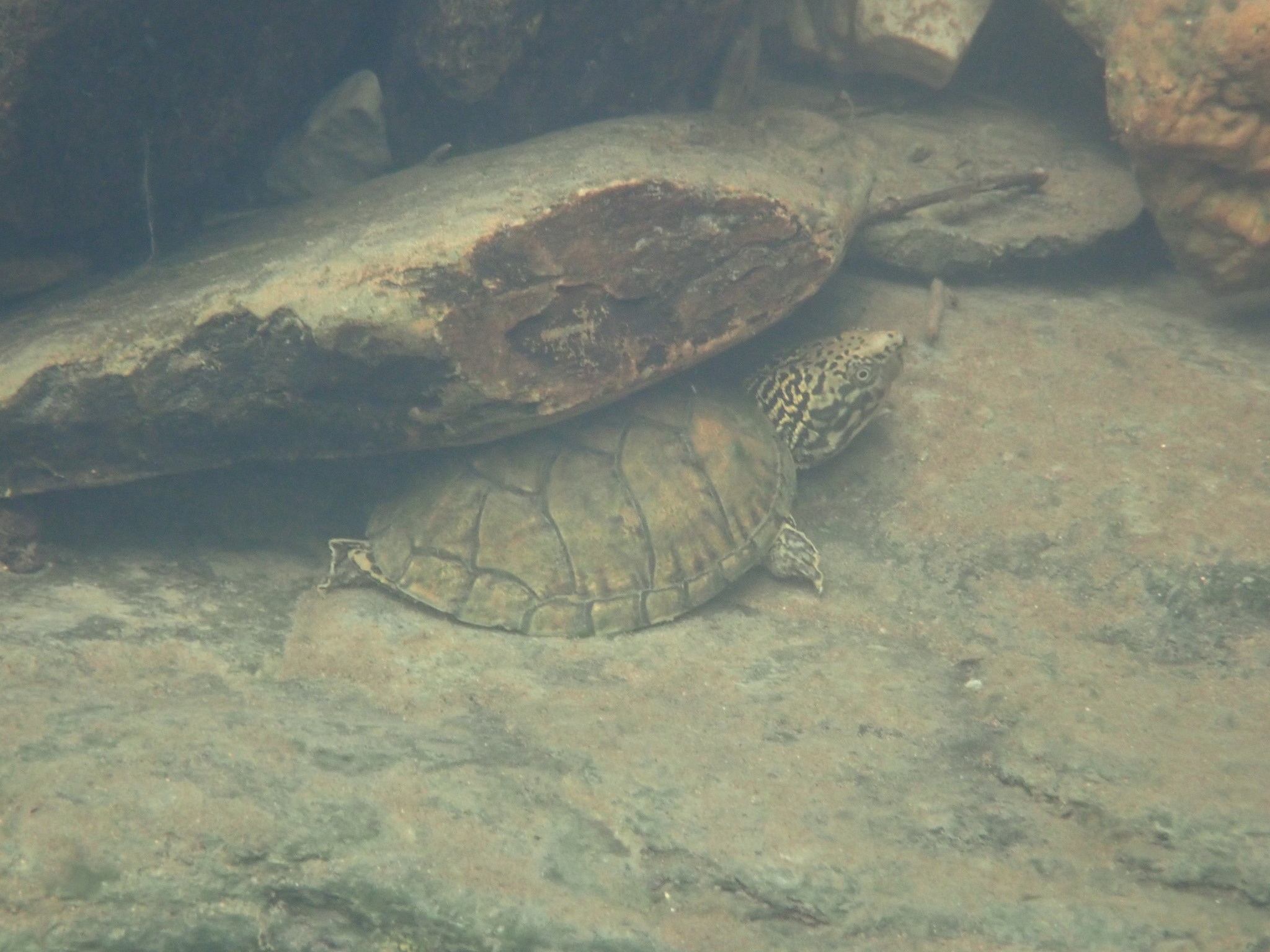
Underwater, Alabama

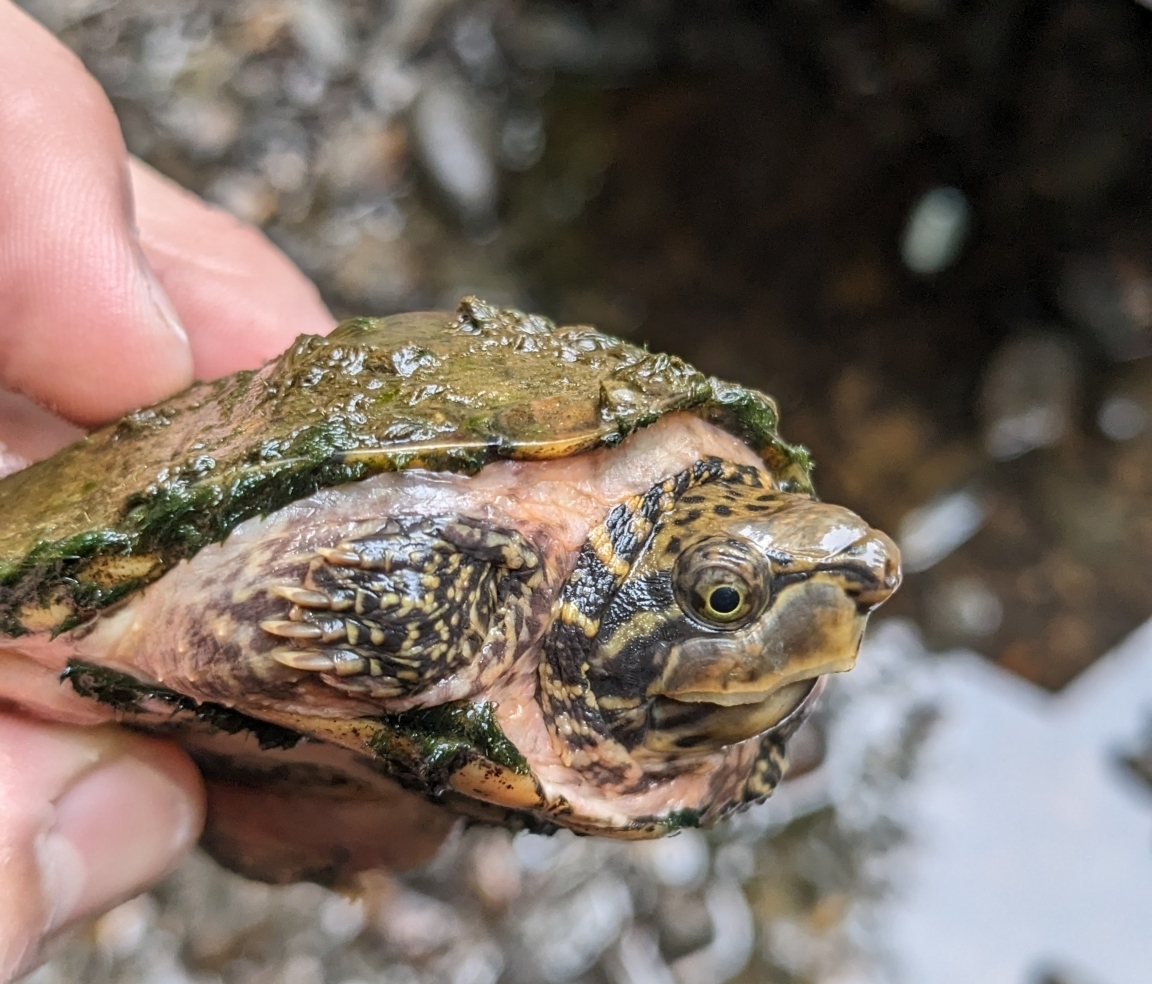
Tennessee
