= Donald W. Tinkle =

American herpetologist (1930–1980)

Donald Ward Tinkle (December 3, 1930 – February 21, 1980) was a prominent herpetologist, ecologist, and evolutionary biologist at the University of Michigan until his illness and death at age 49. He is best known for his intensive demographic studies of lizards, which involved full censuses of local populations repeated over several years to obtain life table parameters such as age at maturity, survivorship, and reproductive effort. He was a pioneer in developing life history theory along with key students including Henry Wilbur, Michael Hirshfield, and Arthur Dunham, and he was an important collaborator with Dr. Richard D. Alexander in the application of individual selection theory and sociobiological ideas to varied organisms including humans.

Tinkle was a student of the renowned herpetologist Fred Cagle, receiving a PhD at Tulane University after conducting studies of freshwater turtles in the southeastern United States with future herpetologist and author J. Whitfield Gibbons as his undergraduate assistant. Before becoming director of the University of Michigan Museum of Zoology, he held a one-year Maytag Chair at Arizona State University in 1972 where he influenced the careers of several young herpetologists, including Laurie J. Vitt and Justin D. Congdon. After his return to the Michigan campus at Ann Arbor, he initiated a project in 1974 at the University's Edwin S. George Reserve that became the longest running and most intensive study ever conducted on the ecology of freshwater turtles. That study continued until 2008 under the direction of Justin D. Congdon.

A species of lizard, Phyllodactylus tinklei, was named in his honor by James R. Dixon in 1966. As of 2020 the species is considered a synonym of Phyllodactylus xanti.
