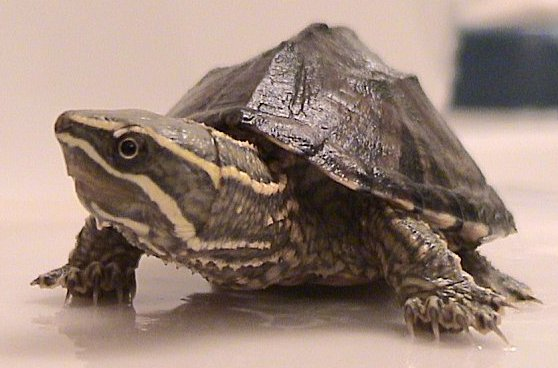
- Common musk turtle, a species of the superfamily Kinosternoidea

Scientific classification
- Kingdom: Animalia
- Phylum: Chordata
- Class: Reptilia
- Order: Testudines
- Suborder: Cryptodira
- Clade: Chelydroidea
- Superfamily: Kinosternoidea; Joyce, Parham, and Gauthier 2004

Families
- Dermatemydidae; Kinosternidae

= Kinosternoidea =

Superfamily of turtles

Kinosternoidea is a superfamily of aquatic turtles, which includes two families: Dermatemydidae, and Kinosternidae.

Kinosternoids are cryptodires, turtles whose necks are able to retract within their shell. Molecular studies suggest they are likely the sister group to the snapping turtles of the family Chelydridae. They are also omnivorous, oviparous, phosphatic, and actively mobile.

== Classification ==
- Family Dermatemydidae

- Genus Dermatemys
- Genus Baptemys

- Family Kinosternidae

- Genus Hoplochelys
- Subfamily Staurotypinae

- Genus Claudius
- Genus Staurotypus

- Subfamily Kinosterninae

- Genus Kinosternon
- Genus Sternotherus

=== Past classification ===
The entirely unrelated big-headed turtle (Platysternon megacephalum) was previously included in classification.
