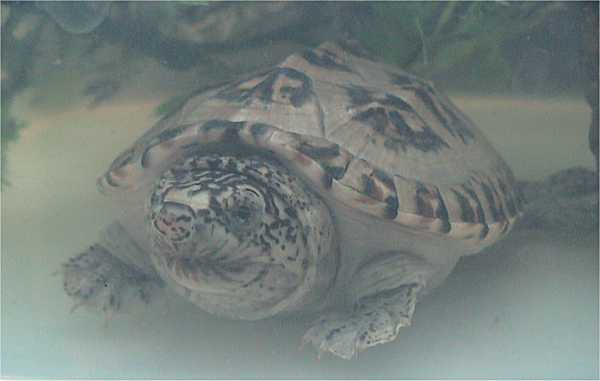
- Staurotypus triporcatus

Conservation status
- Vulnerable (IUCN 3.1)
- CITES Appendix II

Scientific classification
- Kingdom: Animalia
- Phylum: Chordata
- Class: Reptilia
- Order: Testudines
- Suborder: Cryptodira
- Family: Kinosternidae
- Genus: Staurotypus
- Species: S. triporcatus

Binomial name
- Staurotypus triporcatus (Wiegmann, 1828)

Synonyms
- Terrapene triporcata Wiegmann, 1828; Staurotypus triporcatus — Wagler, 1830; Emys (Kinosternon) triporcata — Gray, 1831; Kinosternon triporcatum — Gray, 1831; Clemmys (Staurotypus) triporcata — Fitzinger, 1835; Claudius pictus Cope, 1872; Staurotipus triporcatus — Sumichrast, 1882; Staurotypus triporeatus Thatcher, 1963 (ex errore); Clemmys (Staurotypus) triporcatus — H.M. Smith & R.B. Smith, 1980; Staurotipus triporcatus Ippi & Flores, 2001 (ex errore)

= Mexican musk turtle =

Species of turtle

The Mexican musk turtle (Staurotypus triporcatus), also known commonly as the giant musk turtle, is a species of turtle in the family Kinosternidae. The species occurs in Central America and Mexico.

== Geographic range ==
S. triporcatus is found in Belize, northeastern Guatemala, western Honduras, and Mexico. In Mexico it is found in the Mexican states of Campeche, Chiapas, Oaxaca, Quintana Roo, Tabasco, Tamaulipas, and Veracruz.

== Description ==
S. triporcatus is typically much larger than other species of Kinosternidae, attaining a straight carapace length of up to 36 cm (14 in), with males being significantly smaller than females. It is typically brown, black, or green in color, with a yellow underside. The carapace is distinguished by three distinct ridges, or keels, which run the length.

S. triporcatus exhibits XX/XY sex determination, in contrast to the temperature-dependent sex determination of most turtles.

== Diet ==
Like other musk turtle species, S. triporcatus is carnivorous, eating various types of aquatic invertebrates, as well as fish and carrion..
