= Shandongemys =

Shandongemys Temporal range: Late Cretaceous, ~85–75 Ma

Scientific classification
- Domain: Eukaryota
- Kingdom: Animalia
- Phylum: Chordata
- Class: Reptilia
- Order: Testudines
- Suborder: Cryptodira
- Superfamily: Testudinoidea
- Family: †Lindholmemydidae
- Genus: †Shandongemys; Lu et al., 2013
- Species: †S. dongwuica

Binomial name
- †Shandongemys dongwuica Lu et al., 2013

Extinct genus of turtles

Shandongemys is an extinct genus of turtle from the Late Cretaceous Wangshi Group of Shandong, China, and the type species is S. dongwuica. The holotype is ZCDM V0050.
