= Gomphochelys =

Gomphochelys Temporal range: Paleocene–Eocene

Scientific classification
- Kingdom: Animalia
- Phylum: Chordata
- Class: Reptilia
- Order: Testudines
- Suborder: Cryptodira
- Family: Dermatemydidae
- Genus: †Gomphochelys; Bourque et al., 2015

Type species
- Gomphochelys nanus

Extinct genus of turtles

Gomphochelys is an extinct genus of dermatemydid sea turtles that lived in Wyoming during the Palaeocene-Eocene Thermal Maximum. It is known from a single species, G. nanus.
