= Wutuchelys =

Wutuchelys Temporal range: Ypresian

Scientific classification
- Kingdom: Animalia
- Phylum: Chordata
- Class: Reptilia
- Order: Testudines
- Suborder: Cryptodira
- Superfamily: Testudinoidea
- Genus: †Wutuchelys
- Species: †W. eocenica

Binomial name
- †Wutuchelys eocenica Tong et al., 2019

Extinct genus of testudinoid

Wutuchelys is an extinct genus of testudinoid that lived during the Ypresian stage of the Eocene epoch.

== Distribution ==
Wutuchelys eocenica is known from the Wutu Formation of Shandong, China.
