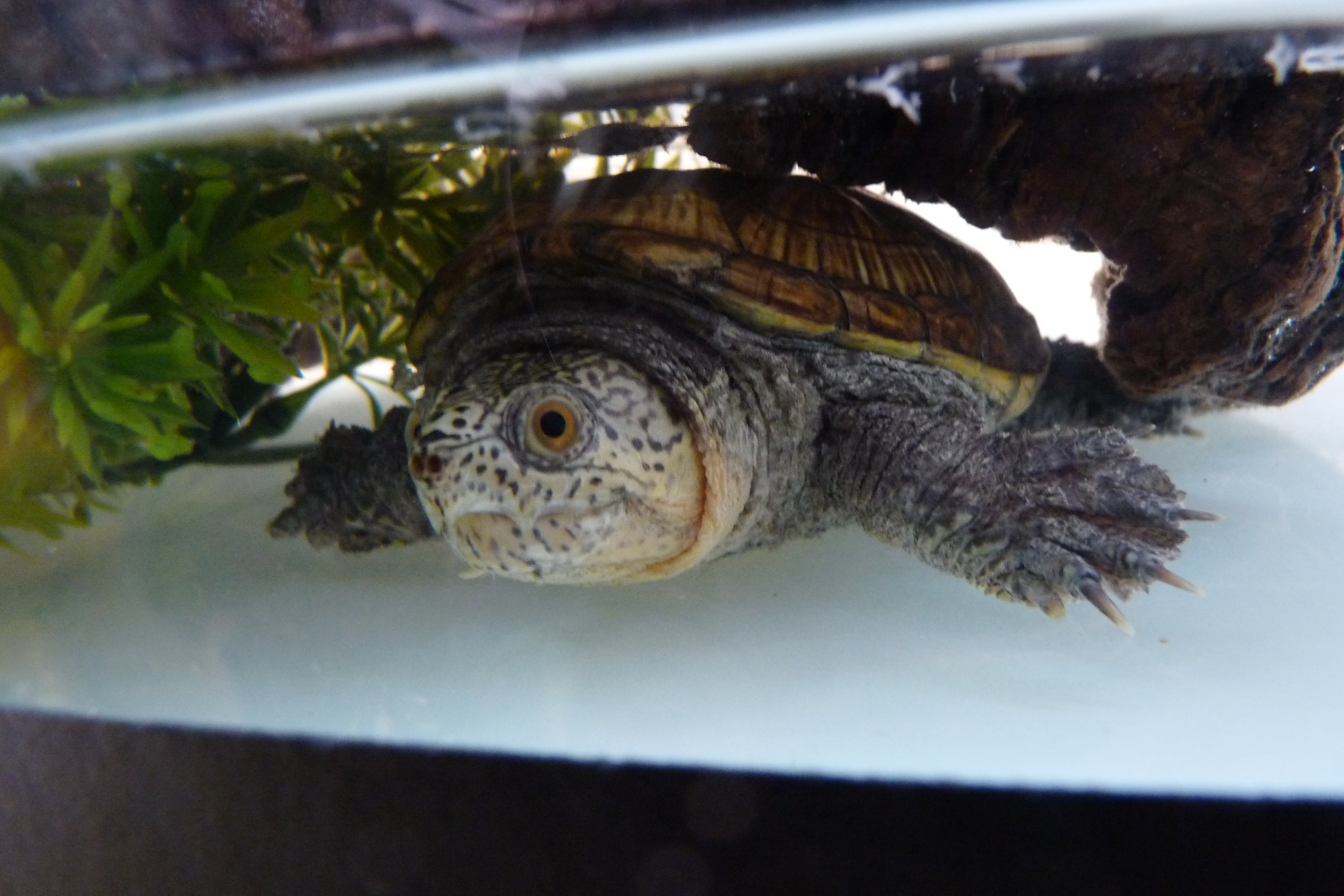
- Claudius angustatus in an aquarium

Conservation status
- Endangered (IUCN 3.1)
- CITES Appendix II

Scientific classification
- Kingdom: Animalia
- Phylum: Chordata
- Class: Reptilia
- Order: Testudines
- Suborder: Cryptodira
- Family: Kinosternidae
- Subfamily: Staurotypinae
- Genus: Claudius; Cope, 1865
- Species: C. angustatus

Binomial name
- Claudius angustatus Cope, 1865

Synonyms
- Claudius angustatus Cope, 1865; Claudius megalocephalus Bocourt, 1868; Claudius macrocephalus Gray, 1868 (ex errore); Claudius megacephalus Boulenger, 1889 (ex errore); Claudias angustatus — Velasco, 1892; Claudius agassizii H.M. Smith & Taylor, 1950 (nomen nudum); Claudius angustatum — Sullivan & Riggs, 1967

= Narrow-bridged musk turtle =

Species of turtle in the family Kinosternidae

The narrow-bridged musk turtle (Claudius angustatus) is a species of turtle in the family Kinosternidae. The species is found in Central America and Mexico.

== Geographic range ==
C. angustatus is found in Mexico, Guatemala, and Belize.

== Taxonomy ==
As of 2010, C. angustatus is the only recognized extant species in the genus Claudius.

== Description ==
The narrow-bridged musk turtle is typically brown in color. The scutes of the carapace have lines and graining, imparting an almost wood-like appearance. It often has bright-yellow markings on the edges of the carapace. As it ages, algae often heavily cover the shell, masking the patterning and coloration. The head is large and bulbous for its size, with a sharp beak and a long neck. The jaw joint anatomy of the narrow-bridged musk turtle is unique among modern Cryptodira. In most cryptodires the jaw joint is formed by a biconcave facet. In the narrow-bridged musk turtle, the jaw joint of is formed by a broad hemispherical condyle, more akin to Pleurodira. The carapace is domed, with three distinct ridges down the length. Though classified in the subfamily Staurotypinae with the "giant" musk turtles, the narrow-bridged musk turtle generally only grows to a straight carapace length of about 6.5 in (16.5 cm).

The narrow-bridged musk turtle exhibits genetic sex determination, in contrast to most turtles; although the mechanism is not known for certain, it is suspected to be XX/XY like that of its relative Staurotypus.

== Behavior, habitat, and diet ==
Like all musk turtles, the narrow-bridged musk turtle is almost entirely aquatic, and prefers habitats such as slow-moving creeks, or shallow ponds that are heavily vegetated. It spends much of its time walking along the bottom, foraging for aquatic insects and other invertebrates, and carrion. It has glands under the rear of the shell from which it can release a foul-smelling musk, hence its common name.
