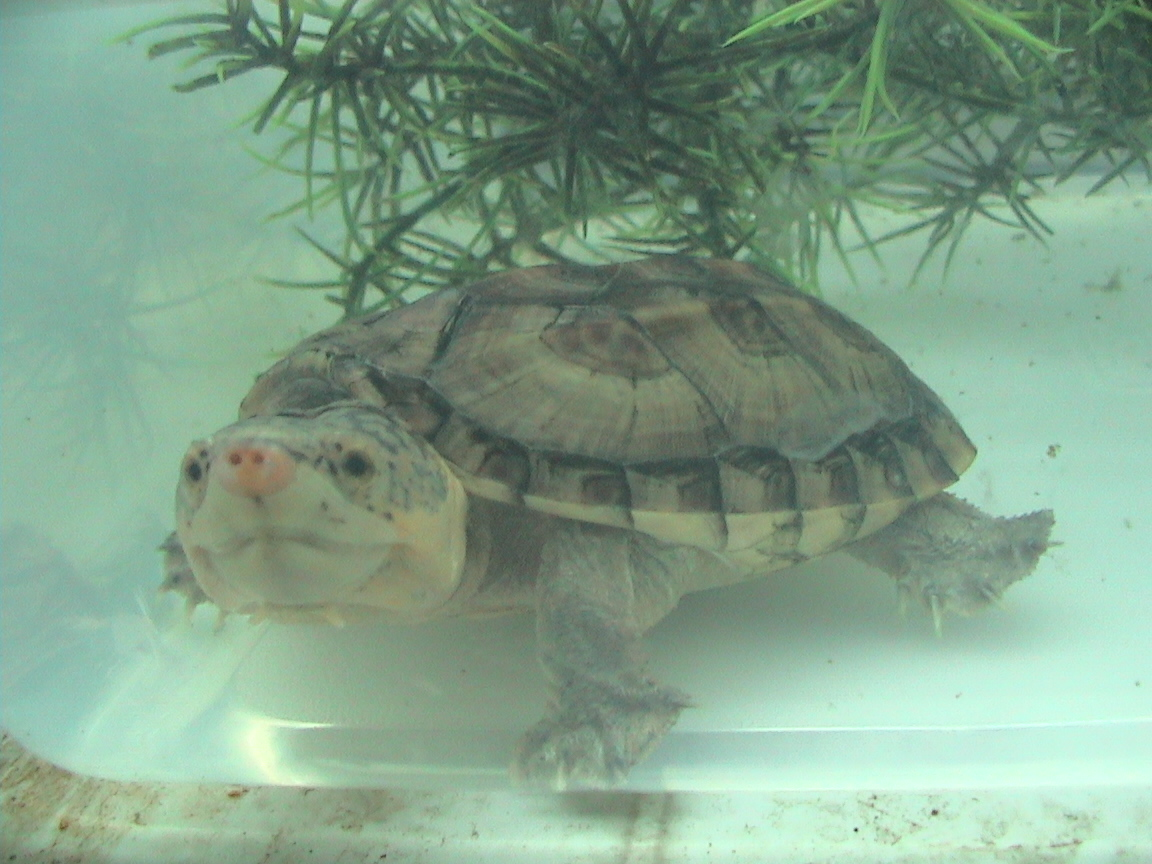
- The giant musk turtle Staurotypus salvinii

Scientific classification
- Kingdom: Animalia
- Phylum: Chordata
- Class: Reptilia
- Order: Testudines
- Suborder: Cryptodira
- Family: Kinosternidae
- Subfamily: Staurotypinae; Gray, 1869

= Staurotypinae =

Subfamily of turtles

The Staurotypinae are a subfamily of the family Kinosternidae of aquatic turtles, which contains the genera Claudius and Staurotypus.

Staurotypus exhibits XX/XY sex determination, in contrast to the temperature-dependent sex determination of most turtles. Although the exact mechanism of sex determination in Claudius is unknown, it is known to be genetically determined; it is suspected that it exhibits XX/XY sex determination as well.

== Genera ==
- Claudius
- Staurotypus
