= Richard Vogt =

Richard Vogt may refer to:

- Richard Vogt (boxer) (1913–1988), German boxer
- Richard Vogt (aircraft designer) (1894–1979), German aircraft designer
- Richard Vogt (herpetologist) (1949–2021), American scientist

== See also ==
- Vogt (surname)
