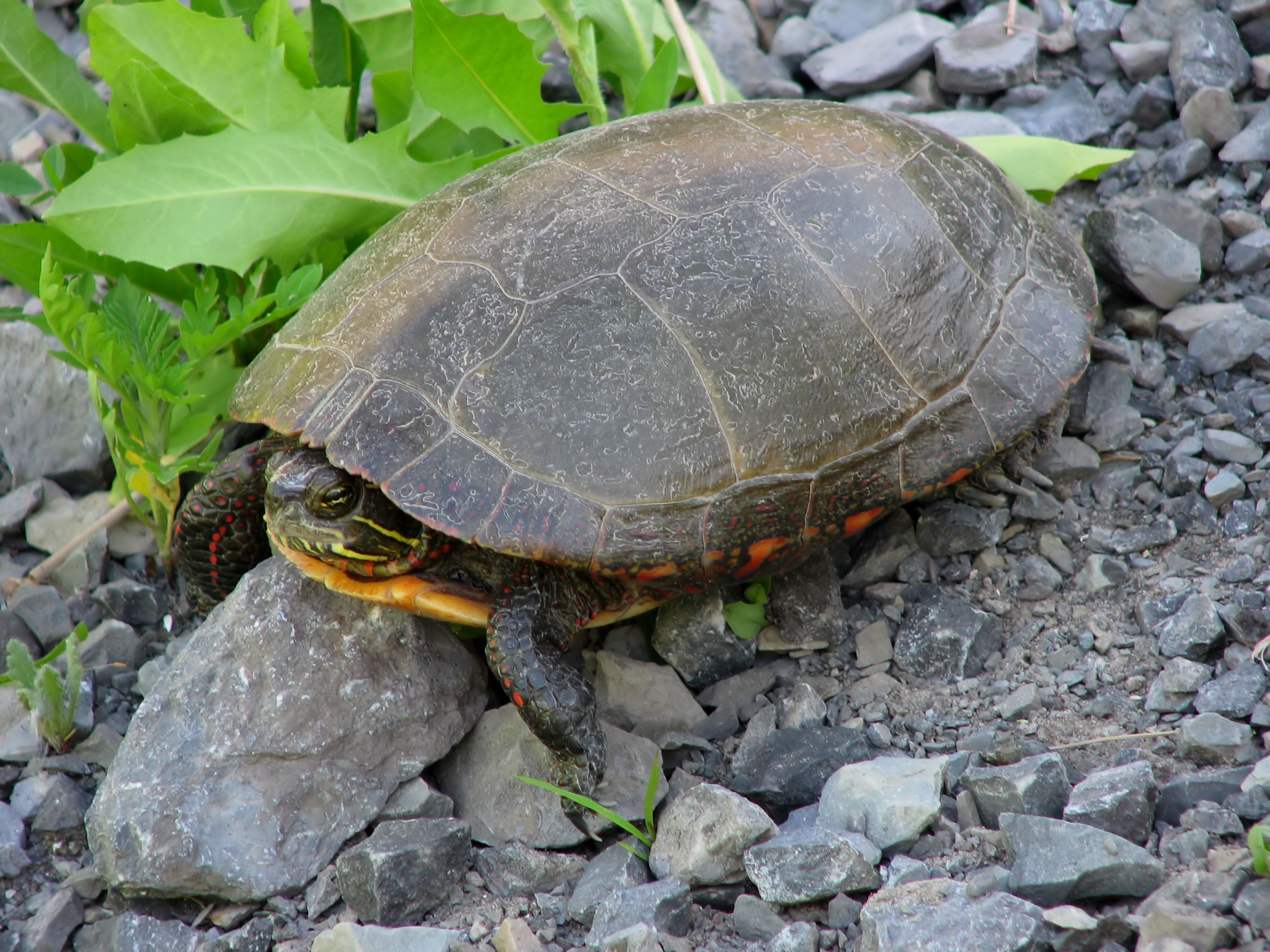
- Midland painted turtle (Chrysemys picta marginata) a species of the family Emydidae in the Testudinoidea superfamily

Scientific classification
- Kingdom: Animalia
- Phylum: Chordata
- Class: Reptilia
- Order: Testudines
- Suborder: Cryptodira
- Clade: Durocryptodira
- Clade: Pantestudinoidea
- Superfamily: Testudinoidea; Fitzinger, 1826

Families
- †Wutuchelys; Emydidae; Geoemydidae; †Haichemydidae; †Lindholmemydidae; Platysternidae; †Sinochelyidae; Testudinidae

= Testudinoidea =

Superfamily of turtles

Testudinoidea is a superfamily within the suborder Cryptodira of the order Testudines. It includes the pond turtles (Family: Emydidae), Asian turtles (Family: Geoemydidae), the monotypic big-headed turtle (Family: Platysternidae), and the tortoises (Family: Testudinidae).

== Systematics ==
A 2021 study found the clade to be divided into two extant groups: Emysternia, containing Emydidae and Platysternidae; and Testuguria, containing Geoemydidae and Testudinidae. The extinct Lindholmemydidae, formerly classified in Testudinoidea, may fall outside the crown group of Testudinoidea, although there is not yet enough evidence for this.

- Pantestudinoidea
  - †Lindholmemydidae?
  - Testudinoidea
    - †Wutuchelys
    - †Haichemydidae
    - †Sinochelyidae
    - Emysternia
      - Emydidae
      - Platysternidae
    - Testuguria
      - Geoemydidae
      - Testudinidae
