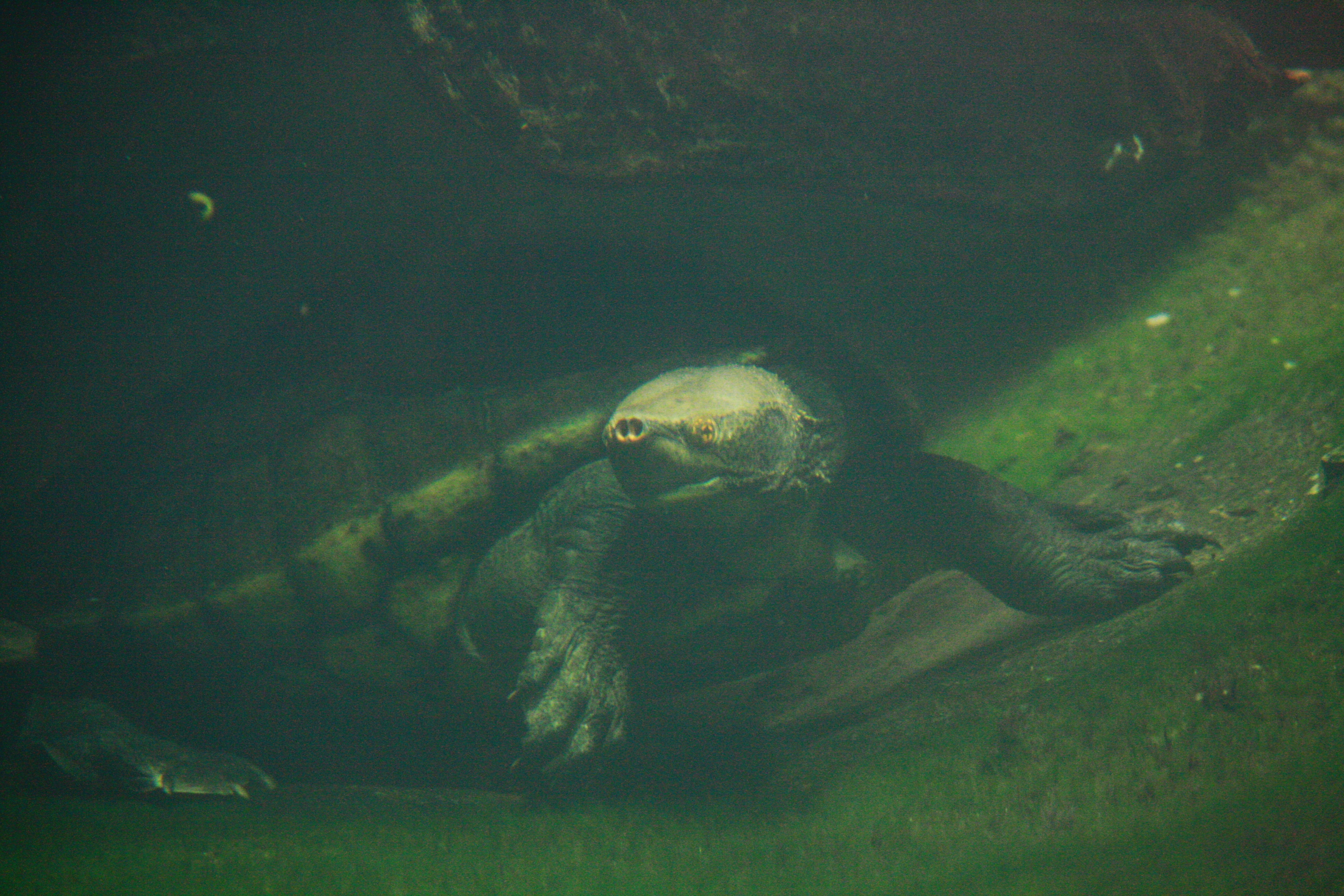
- In the Prague Zoo

Conservation status
- Critically Endangered (IUCN 3.1)
- CITES Appendix II

Scientific classification
- Kingdom: Animalia
- Phylum: Chordata
- Order: Testudines
- Suborder: Cryptodira
- Family: Dermatemydidae
- Genus: Dermatemys; Gray, 1847
- Species: D. mawii

Binomial name
- Dermatemys mawii Gray, 1847

Synonyms
- Dermatemys mawii Gray, 1847: 56; Emys berardii A.M.C. Duméril & Bibron, 1851: 11; Dermatemys abnormis Cope, 1868: 120; Dermatemys salvinii Gray, 1870: 50; Limnochelone micrura F. Werner, 1901: 298

= Hickatee =

Genus of turtles

The hickatee (Dermatemys mawii) or in Spanish tortuga blanca ("white turtle"), also called the Central American river turtle, is the only living species in the family Dermatemydidae. The species is found in the Atlantic drainages of Central America, specifically Belize, Guatemala, southern Mexico, and probably Honduras. It is a relatively large-bodied species, with records of 60 cm (24 in) straight carapace length and weights of 22 kg (49 lb); although most individuals are smaller. This is a herbivorous and almost completely aquatic turtle that does not surface to bask. Bizarrely for reptiles, the eggs can remain viable even after being underwater for weeks -in the recent past, some scientists mistakenly claimed it nests underwater, likely due to visiting Central America during a frequent flood, when nests are often submerged.

In the culture of the Ancient Mayan civilisation this species and turtles in general had numerous uses such as being used in warfare, as musical instruments and as food, with this species likely being consumed by the elites during feasts. The Maya probably exported these turtles to areas where they do not occur, based on their shell remains in kitchen middens. There is genetic evidence that the Mayans and other ancient peoples may have hunted the turtle to local extinction in areas it now occurs in, and that some modern turtle populations stem from turtles introduced into waterways from elsewhere. The turtle also had mythological symbolism, although the true nature of Ancient Mayan myth has been largely obscured by time. Among the modern communities inheriting this land the turtle continues to be eagerly sought as a dish eaten during important cultural events. The meat of this turtle is said to be very tasty. It has thus had a long history of exploitation.

This has prompted Western conservationists to declare this use unsustainable, and that the turtle is now 'critically endangered', especially singling out the people of Tabasco as the culprits. In Belize, the only country where it is still legal to hunt these animals, it is still common in some areas, but populations are devastated in areas where people live. In Mexico, the state of the population is unclear. It was said to be almost extirpated from Mexico in 2006 based on an entry in a book from the 1970s, but reasonable amounts are still caught in areas such as Tabasco and Quintana Roo. In Guatemala the species is abundant in some areas, but uncommon elsewhere.

Although in the 1990s scientists dismissed breeding this species as impracticable, it is now known they can reproduce in poor waters, and as a generalist herbivorous species fodder costs are low. Much has been discovered regarding their animal husbandry, with some US scientists now musing that commercial breeding might be cost effective using experimental polyculture systems with the turtles as a secondary income source. The Mexican government already stimulated the farming of this species in the 2000s, there are now likely a few thousand kept in captivity there. The health of these captive animals is not ideal, and the success of these operations is unclear.

== Taxonomy ==
Dermatemys mawii is the only living species in the family Dermatemydidae. Its closest relatives are only known from fossils with some 19 genera described from a worldwide distribution in the Jurassic and Cretaceous.

=== Etymology ===
The specific name, mawii, is in honour of the collector of the type specimen, Lieutenant Mawe of the British Navy.

This species is usually vernacularly called tortuga blanca in Spanish, because it can be readily distinguished when prepared as food. When the meat of this turtle is cooked, it turns a white colour, unlike the more common turtle meat (Trachemys scripta), which colours dark.

=== Genetics ===
Many species sharing a similar distribution have phylogeographic structure revealed in their genomes, with the population often being split into at least three subgroups representing the three main Atlantic hydrological basins of this region, the Papaloapan, Coatzacoalcos and Grijalva-Usumacinta. A 2011 study of the mitochondrial DNA (mtDNA) of extant populations throughout the range of this species, however, revealed a less clear differentiation. Although some genetic structure was evident, most locations showed a high rate of mixing of different lineages, with two main closely related mitochondrial haplotypes dominating the population. Three divergent mitochondrial lineages were found: an extremely rare one dubbed '1D' only found in four samples from Sarstún and Salinas on the southeast edge of the Grijalva-Usumacinta basin, a second northernmost 'Papaloapan' lineage restricted to the Papaloapan basin in the state of Veracruz, to the west of the Sierra de Santa Marta and the Isthmus of Tehuantepec, and a third widespread 'central' lineage that was found in all studied localities. It appeared as if a formerly clear phylogeographical pattern had been obscured by transport and introductions of turtle populations from one waterway to another, i.e. secondary blurring by large-scale gene flow between populations. Low haplotype diversity at some localities indicated prehistoric population bottlenecks, possibly after a drastic cull from over-harvesting, followed by population expansions. As it is almost certain the Ancient Maya were engaged in long distance trade in this turtle species and consumed large amounts, it was deemed most probable that the Maya were responsible for this (see section on interaction with humans below). Even today, turtles have been found trapped in small isolated ponds (called aguadas in Guatemala) where they would be unlikely to naturally disperse to, or in areas they do not naturally occur, likely moved there by people in order to harvest them at a later date.

Although most haplotypes were relatively closely related, there was one highly divergent haplotype which only showed up in four samples from Sarstún and Salinas, divergent enough to represent a possible new hyper-critically endangered cryptic species. Hydrological reproductive barriers between populations may have led to the main lineages splitting in the Pliocene to Pleistocene (3.73–0.227 million years ago), generally enough time to accumulate the genetic divergences for speciation to occur. The sampling locations, however, also contained the common central haplotypes. The existence of such divergent genes led Vogt et al. to recommended splitting up the taxon into three evolutionary significant units, corresponding to the Sarstun, Salinas, and Papaloapan populations, and something called a 'management unit' (Note: unexplained, but most likely sensu Moritz C (1999) Conservation units and translocations: strategies for conserving evolutionary processes. Hereditas 30: 217–228. fide González (2013).) for the locations where all of the 238 turtles tested in 2011 had the more common central mitochondria, for conservation purposes. Although mtDNA can reveal deep genetic structure in populations, as it is only inherited via the mother, it does not show insofar different subpopulations are independently evolving units, because different populations may interbreed without this showing in the mtDNA of individuals. A subsequent 2013 study of eight loci of the nuclear DNA aimed to resolve this.

This 2013 study found no sign of a recent bottleneck in the fifteen locations sampled, indicating that harvesting going for the past half century had not yet had an effect on genomic diversity, possibly a long generation time and delayed sexual maturity of D. mawii buffering against loss of genetic diversity despite population size reduction. The Sarstún and Salinas populations in general were not strongly differentiated from the neighbouring populations, but the four individuals from Sarstún and Salinas with divergent mitochondria did have divergent microsatellite loci sequences in varying amounts according to the individual, with three rare alleles only found in this subpopulation of four. The samples from Papaloapan locations were highly differentiated compared to almost all other populations, and also were rich in unique alleles. However, individuals carrying Papaloapan-type mtDNA haplotypes did not appear differentiated from the central type individuals, and these individuals occurred at relatively low frequencies amongst the central type haplotypes shared with adjacent populations to the east of the isthmus, indicating significant gene flow of mitochondrial lineages westwards across the isthmus. At the same time nuclear microsatellites appear to show gene flow in the other direction. Such conflicting signals could be caused by different episodes, or be due to a sex bias in dispersal. Also the populations from Sibun River, Lake Salpetén and Laguna Sacnab, all near the eastern edge of the distribution, were relatively well-differentiated from the remaining populations. This was thought to be due to losses of genetic variability from recent genetic drift and/or demographic isolation. All the other populations had high levels of gene flow, even between areas separated by geographic distances of more than 300 km. The study found that this suggests likely thousands of years of human-mediated trade, but that it might also just mean that this species is capable of moving great distances during its life. Besides microsatellite regions another part of the nuclear DNA was looked at, a 779 bp fragment of first intron of the RNA protein R35, with four haplotypes found. This revealed no phylogeographic structure: the main haplotype was common across the distribution, and the four individuals from Sarstún and Salinas all had this haplotype.

The overall pattern is completely different in the alligator snapping turtle (Macrochelys temminckii), which is also often caught, but in which gene flow between populations is very low, but the mixed lineages are somewhat similar to the diamondback terrapin (Malaclemys terrapin), with translocations during the early twentieth century, or the radiated tortoise (Geochelone radiata) and gopher tortoises (Gopherus polyphemus), which show contemporary population structuring influenced by recent releases.

The 2013 study concluded that as there was evidence of substantial genetic mingling the species was best regarded as a single cohesive 'management unit' for conservation purposes, as opposed to Vogt et al. in 2011. The sample size of the individuals with the 1D mitochondria was too small to calculate insofar they represent a taxonomically relevant cryptic species.

== Description ==
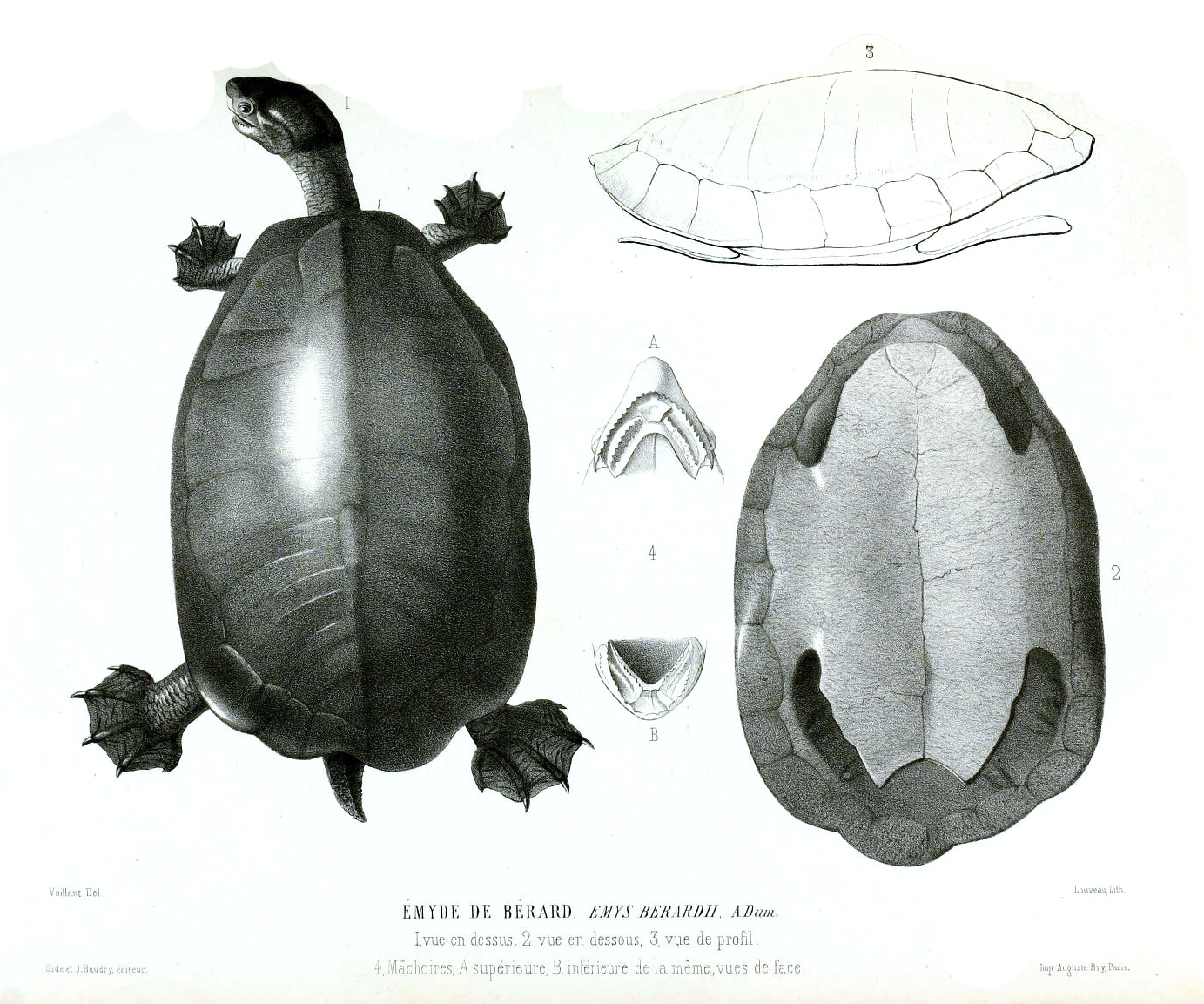

Dermatemys mawii It is a relatively large-bodied species, with historical records of 60 cm (24 in) straight carapace length and weights of 22 kg (49 lb); however, more recent records have found few individuals over 14 kg (31 lb) in Mexico or 11 kg (24 lb) in Guatemala. It has a low, flattened, smooth carapace with a median keel present in juveniles, it is usually a uniform brown, almost black, grey or olive in colour. The plastron is usually white to yellow, though may acquire substrate staining in some areas. In juveniles, a distinctive keel is found down the centre of the carapace, and the outer edges have serrations. These features are lost as the turtle ages. Its skin is predominantly the same colour as the shell, with reddish or peach-coloured markings around the neck and underside.

Adult males can often be differentiated from females by yellow (although sometimes cream or reddish-brown) markings on the top of their heads, as opposed to the uniformly dull-coloured heads of females, and longer, thicker tails.

== Distribution ==
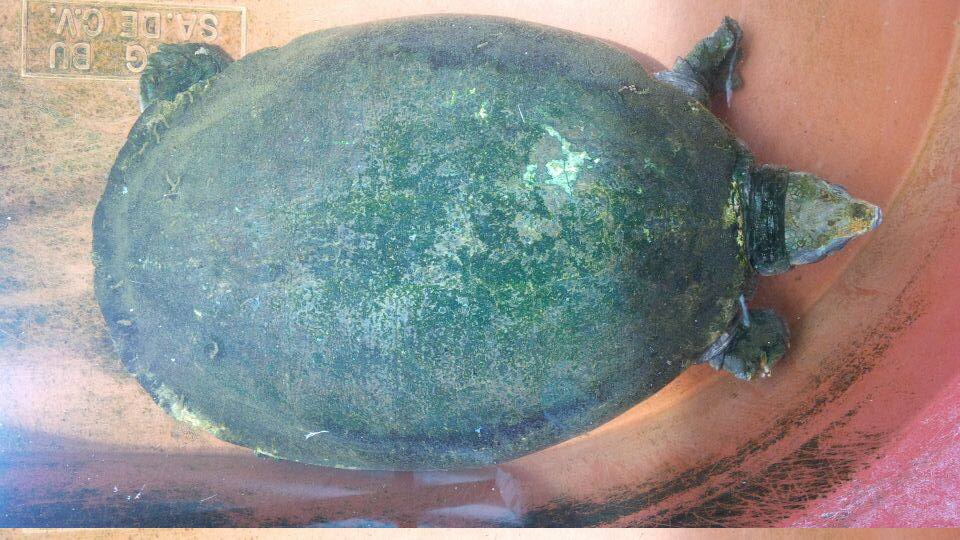

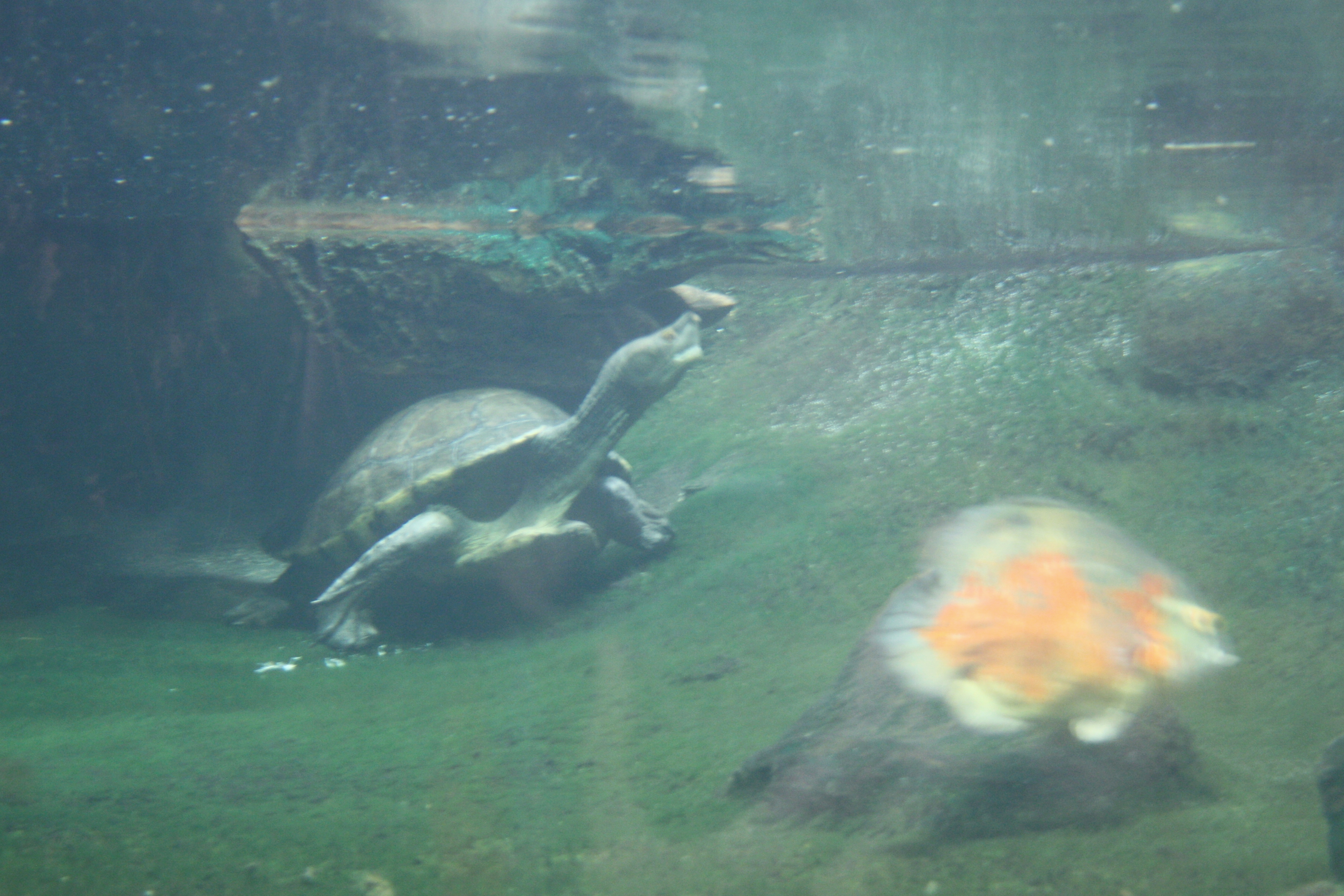
Central American river turtle in Prague Zoo

Dermatemys mawii lives in Atlantic-draining larger rivers and lakes in Central America, from southern Mexico through Belize to the Guatemalan-Honduran border. In Mexico it occurs in the states of Veracruz, Tabasco, Campeche, the north of Oaxaca, the north of Chiapas and the south of Quintana Roo, primarily in the hydrological basins of the Papaloapan, Coatzacoalcos and Grijalva-Usumacinta River systems.

In Guatemala the species occurs from southern and central Petén Department, south to Lago de Izabal and the rivers which drain into it. The presence and status in the Río Motagua bordering Honduras was unknown in 2011. It is reasonably common in the Pasión River and its tributaries as well as several lakes in Petén as of 1998. It was once common in Lake Petén Itzá, but by 1998 had become rarer there. It is well protected in Yaxhá Lake. In 2007 it was found to occur throughout northern Petén in the area corresponding to the Maya Biosphere Reserve, with the researchers reporting that it was quite common almost everywhere, and extending the known distribution somewhat with the Río Azul in Mirador-Río Azul National Park and Playa Grande, Quiche. Based on an extrapolation of the turtle densities obtained in this survey, 4,081 turtles are estimated to currently exist within this area. This number is clearly an extreme underestimate, as only the surface area of large water bodies and rivers was taken into account, and the lowest densities found in the area were used in the calculations in order to be conservative. Very high turtle densities were captured in Laguna Peru in 2007 and 2009.

== Ecology ==
Dermatemys mawii is a nocturnal, completely aquatic turtle that does not bask or leave the water, except to lay eggs.

The most significant predator is the otter (Lontra longicaudis). Vogt et al. stated in 2011 that these otters are known to be able to keep turtle populations low in some cases by hindering recruitment, whereas Platt and Rainwater in 2011 claim that they are the first to register otter predation in this species, and note that because other otter species in Canada or Europe are not significant predators of other species of turtles and turtles are not believed to form a major part of the otter diets, they hypothesise that otter predation is not significant, and also state that while there was ample evidence for otter predation in one part of Belize, this was the only place they had seen it occur. Campbell in 1998 notes that the otter is itself not common enough for this to be an issue. Especially large juveniles and subadults are preyed upon by otters in Belize. Otter predation can be recognised by the manner by which they typically chew off the heads, tail and limbs, sometimes slurping out the entrails, but leave the shell intact.

The crocodiles Crocodylus moreletii and C. acutus usually feed on juveniles and hatchlings, or intermediate-sized turtles. Crocodiles crush the shell and swallow the turtle whole. The indigo snake Drymarchon melanurus preys on the eggs and hatchlings. According to one report raccoons (Procyon lotor) have a similar feeding strategy as otters, and typically target nesting females, other reports has them as predators of the eggs and hatchlings. Other predators of the eggs and hatchlings are coati (Nasua narica) and birds are also known to eat the eggs and hatchlings, namely the rails Aramides cajanea and Rallus longirostris, limpkins (Aramus guarauna) and the herons Butorides virescens, Nycticorax nycticorax and Nyctanassa violacea. A possible predator is the jaguar (Panthera onca), which feeds on turtles in general by cracking the shell open to scoop out the contents.

D. mawii hosts a number of specialised parasites. The fluke Caballerodiscus resupinatus is found in the intestine and C. tabascensis in the intestine and stomach, both have been found in Tabasco and Veracruz, Parachiorchis parviacetabulatus recorded from the intestine was only found once in Veracruz, Pseudocleptodiscus margaritae recorded from the intestine was only found twice in Tabasco, Dermatemytrema trifoliatum in the intestine and stomach from Oaxaca, Tabasco and Veracruz, Octangioides skrjabini was recorded from the intestine and only found once in Tabasco, whereas O. tlacotalpensis was recorded from the intestine and only found in two localities in Veracruz, and lastly Choanophorus rovirosai was recorded from the intestine in Tabasco and Veracruz. All of these eight fluke species are only known to be hosted by D. mawii. Serpinema trispinosum is a parasitic nematode (also see entry on diet below) which has been recovered from a wide variety of freshwater turtles in North and Central America. Species of Placobdella, a type of leech, have been Chiapas found to suck blood from the skin of these turtles, as well as a number of other Kinosternon mud turtles in other parts of southern Mexico. A study on the blood of turtles collected in the wild in Pantanos de Centla Biosphere Reserve and a turtle breeding farm, both located in Tabasco, found 100% of the wild turtles were infected with a species of Haemogregarina, a protozoan parasite inhabiting the red blood cells of turtles and spread by leeches. The protozoan was more prevalent during the rainy season. 27% of the wild turtles had leeches feeding off them, with no apparent detrimental effect on the hosts. The captive turtles were uninfected by both, but more unhealthy in other ways, wild turtles were better fed, bigger, and exhibited no real damage to the shell or major wounds.

On a turtle farm in Veracruz it was noticed that turtles kept out of water for any period were highly susceptible to a bacterial lung infection.

=== Diet ===
Dermatemys mawii is herbivorous; it is a generalist, feeding on aquatic plants, floating plants, shoreline emergents, bank vegetation and grasses depending on the habitat. Typically, these include Russell river grass (Paspalum paniculatum), among others. It will also eat fruit and flowers opportunistically. During the rainy season the waters rise a few metres, sometimes many, in some places this brings the leaves and branches of terrestrial trees within the jaws of this turtle and it will largely browse on this during this season, in other places the water floods pastures, and the turtle will primarily graze upon the submerged grass. The habitat appears to be the main factor impacting diet -in many rivers the water is too strong or the waters to muddy to sustain aquatic plant-life, and in these waters the turtles feed on plants growing on the banks. Where the banks are too steep for such plants, here the turtles feed on leaves of overhanging branches.

It feeds during the night, spending most of the day underwater, generally in the deepest parts, usually near or under large branches and likewise, and often half-buried in the mud.

Because leafy vegetables are low-energy foods requiring extensive digestion, and reptiles are cold-blooded, herbivorous reptiles usually try to speed things up by basking in the sun -water turtles plopping back into the water as one walks past a lake is a common experience in tropical and subtropical climates. This species does not bask, maintaining the same body temperature as the waters which surround it. Thus this means that it likely has a specialised gut flora to help it break down its food, but the particulars of this have not adequately been explored. One experiment found that symbiotic microorganisms must aid in digestion -when eggs from the same nest were incubated and separated into two groups, with the hatchlings in one group being fed adult faeces and other group lacking this food additive, found that the young which snacked on excrement grew much faster than their peers. In green iguanas the behaviour of young feeding on adult dung is known to be important, but it is unknown if this means that turtle hatchlings also exhibit this behaviour in the wild. The intestines of these turtles are commonly swarming with nematodes-again, in iguanas of the Cyclura genus similar worms appear to aid in digestion, but in this case it is unknown if they are parasites, commensals or symbionts.

Captured D. mawii will occasionally, however, eat fish. Juveniles in captivity tend to more readily accept animal matter as food which may show that young D. mawii are more apt to be carnivorous.

=== Reproduction ===
The exact reproductive season for this species, Dermatemys mawii, has been confused in the literature. However, it is possible that a combination of a diapause and variable local reproductive cues is responsible for this. There appears to be a primary breeding season timed with the later part of the rainy season (September to December) and a secondary one at the beginning of the dry season (January to February). The species can lay up to 4 clutches per year with an average of 2–20 eggs per clutch; clutch sizes over 15, however, were not common.

As this species often buries its eggs in more than one nests with a rather random spatial distribution within one to three metres along a constantly shifting shoreline, the nests are extremely difficult to locate for humans, and finding eggs is very uncommon. In 1989 and 1990, despite nightly searches by a team during two seasons, only two nests were located. Polisar was never able to witness nesting himself, but three accounts from local hunters had the animals nesting within 1.5 metres from the shoreline.

In 1996 Polisar published that it was quite possible that the turtles nest underwater like the Australian Chelodina rugosa, a claim repeated as a certainty in later works, but in 2011 Vogt et al. dismiss the claim as invented by 'locals' confused by the constantly rising and falling waters of their homeland.

== Interaction with humans ==
Dermatemys mawii has been hunted for food for millennia. Archaeologists have recovered the remains of what appear to be Ancient Mayan feasts, wherein large numbers of turtles were roasted. Such remains are also found in areas, such as the eastern and northern Yucatán, where the species is not believed to occur today. This could be due to import during Mayan times, or represent a distribution it is now extirpated from, or modern scientists simply have not looked properly here. A 2011 study of the mtDNA of extant populations throughout the range of this species indicated that the population was likely highly impacted during Mayan times, and may have even been extirpated from certain areas, only to be restocked from other waterways. The mitochondrial divergences likely represent hydrological reproductive barriers between populations that may have existed for up to three million years, but there is an absence of a clear phylogeographical pattern between the lineages and the collection localities, with different mitochondrial lineages interspersed amongst each other, which shows probable large-scale gene flow between populations. This can be explained by colonisation of the area by imported animals. Haplotype diversity was furthermore found to be quite low in some populations, which was explained as likely the result of bottlenecks resulting from over-harvesting during Mayan followed by population expansions. A later genetic study refined this story and largely supported it, but proposed alternate explanations. Bottlenecks were not found to be caused by recent hunting pressure in this study (see genetics section above). According to a study by Götz which looked at the contents of different kitchen middens in the Yucatán, it is clear that although all species of turtles were eaten, D. mawii was a luxury product of the elites. Some time later, in the mid-16th century, Spanish explorers of the Gulf Coast of Mexico relate that turtles were a common meal for them there.

The turtles were also used for warfare by the Mayans, the carapace being used as a shield by Mayan warriors.

Today the turtle remains much loved as a traditional feast food in the Tabasco community, where it is considered a mark of cultural identity. D. mawii is primarily prepared for the religious festivities of Lent and Semana Santa.

In Belize these turtles are a culturally important food and popularly served as a traditional dish especially around the festivities of Easter, Christmas and La Ruta Maya, which is a canoe race in March attended by many people. A recipe from the 1950s or 1960s advises pouring boiling water over the chopped pieces of hickatee to remove the thin skin, seasoning the meat with thyme, black pepper, onion, garlic and vinegar and letting it marinate overnight, cooking in hot oil, mixing with coconut cream and serving with rice.

In the Petén highlands of Guatemala it is the most esteemed turtle because of its delicious flesh.

== Conservation ==
Dermatemys mawii is a heavily exploited turtle; it is primarily harvested for its meat, exploitation of nesting females and their eggs is inconsequential because the nests are extremely hard to find. The species has been overhunted because it is valued by local people as a food, thus the meat fetches good prices.

The turtle is now uncommon from much of its former range in southern Mexico. It was assessed by the IUCN as being a critically endangered species in 2006 and is listed as endangered under the US Endangered Species Act. It is listed in Appendix II of the Convention on International Trade in Endangered Species (CITES) meaning international trade is regulated by the CITES permit system, and local laws are in place to control hunting.

=== Conservation efforts in Belize ===
The non-governmental conservation organisation the Turtle Survival Alliance (TSA) has conducted at least two hickatee workshops in Belize in the early 2010s where attendees were taught net capture techniques, measuring captured turtles and recording the information on standard collection sheets.

A countrywide survey of the population in Belize in 1983 and 1984 found that the species was common and abundant in some areas, but declining in population in more human-populated areas. Research in north-central Belize from 1989 through 1991 determined that harvesting rates in human-populated areas were unsustainable. As such, in 1993 the government of Belize instituted a number of new laws meant to control hunting and forbid trade. Hunting was forbidden in a certain closed season, hunters were allowed to bag no more than three turtles, and females above a certain size have to be released. A series of protected zones were established in a number of the major waterways in northern Belize. A 1998 and 1999 survey in north-central Belize found that the species was still common in remote areas, but was also still declining in more populated areas. A 2010 countrywide survey indicated that the population was much the same as in the previous surveys, depressed in human-populated areas, but healthy populations continue to exist in more remote areas. Although there was not much difference between the situation of the population in 2010 compared to the 1980s, there was a general decrease in overall numbers and sighting localities. Interviews with locals indicate the 1993 laws are largely ineffective, hunting continues to be performed with in some areas with hundreds of turtles being caught in small parts of the Belize River, and the traditional Easter dish of the country continues to be served in rural restaurants.

=== Captive breeding ===
In 1997 Polisar claimed it was rarely found in captivity, and that breeding would probably be impractical because he thought the nesting behaviour was complicated in this species. He seems to be somewhat wrong in this. The first turtle farm in Mexico has been operating in Nacajuca, Tabasco, since the 1980s when it began as a rescue centre. It is the largest captive breeding facility for Dermatemys today, with a population of about 700 individuals in 2006, and 800 in 2011. The turtles were three times a week fed with commercial pellets for tilapia fish, Melampodium divaricatum and Eichhornia crassipes, sometimes with the odd vegetable. The reproductive adult females were injected with calcium supplements twice a year (March, after the end of the oviposition period, and June–July at the beginning of the courtship period). The Mexican government has stimulated the breeding of this species in captivity, and as of 2009 fourteen farms were officially registered with the Secretaría del Medio Ambiente y Recursos Naturales, holding a few dozen to a few hundred turtles each.

As a generalist herbivore fodder costs are low. However, growth rates are low. In 2011 some US scientists mused that commercial breeding might be cost effective using experimental aquatic polyculture systems with the turtles as a secondary income source, and shrimp as the main crop. The turtles could graze on weeds and grasses, and do not harm the shrimp. A three year pilot study was done in Veracruz, after the pond weeds were consumed the turtles were fed grass clippings, and the turtles reproduced each year.

A project conducted by TSA on Belize Foundation for Research and Environmental Education property began in early 2011 focused on generating food plants and exploring husbandry details, such as egg laying and incubation. Located in southern Belize along the Bladen River, the 1,200 acres (4.9 km^{2}) property is situated among four protected areas (Bladen Nature Reserve, Cockscomb Basin Jaguar Reserve, Deep River Forest Reserve and Maya Mountain Forest Reserve). The goal of the program was to generate hatchlings and release them for stocking purposes.

As of 2006 it was kept at the following zoos: Veracruz Aquarium, Chicago Zoo, Detroit Zoo, Philadelphia Zoo (with the most specimens), and the Guatemala City Zoo (with only one).
