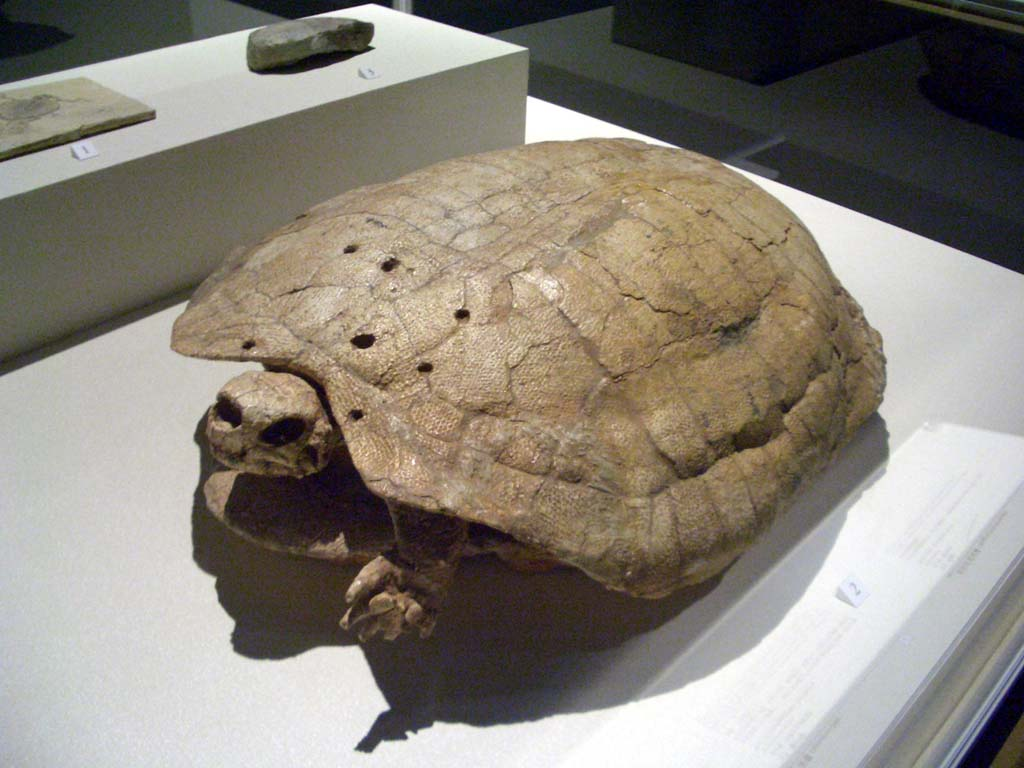
- A Dermatemydidae fossil from Hong Kong Science Museum

Scientific classification
- Kingdom: Animalia
- Phylum: Chordata
- Class: Reptilia
- Order: Testudines
- Suborder: Cryptodira
- Superfamily: Kinosternoidea
- Family: Dermatemydidae; Gray, 1870

Synonyms
- Dermatemydae - Gray, 1870; Dermatemydidae - Baur, 1888

= Dermatemydidae =

Dermatemydidae Temporal range: ?Late Cretaceous to present

Family of turtles

The Dermatemydidae are a family of turtles. The family was named by John Edward Gray in 1870, and its only extant genus is Dermatemys.

== Subtaxa ==
- †Baptemys
- Dermatemys
- †Gomphochelys
- †Notomorpha
