= Lindholmemydidae =

Lindholmemydidae Temporal range: Cenomanian-Ypresian 99.7–55.8 Ma

Scientific classification
- Domain: Eukaryota
- Kingdom: Animalia
- Phylum: Chordata
- Class: Reptilia
- Order: Testudines
- Suborder: Cryptodira
- Superfamily: Testudinoidea
- Family: †Lindholmemydidae; Chkhikvadze, 1970

Extinct family of turtles

Lindholmemydidae is an extinct family of turtles in the Testudinoidea.

== Genera ==
- Amuremys
- Elkemys
- Gravemys
- Hongilemys
- Khodzhakulemys
- Mongolemys
- Paragravemys
- Paramongolemys
- Shandongemys
