= Sinochelyidae =

Sinochelyidae Temporal range: Early Cretaceous - Late Cretaceous 143–66 Ma

Scientific classification
- Domain: Eukaryota
- Kingdom: Animalia
- Phylum: Chordata
- Class: Reptilia
- Order: Testudines
- Suborder: Cryptodira
- Superfamily: Testudinoidea
- Family: †Sinochelyidae

Extinct family of turtles

Sinochelyidae is an extinct family of Testudinoidea turtles found in China.

== Genera ==
- Heishanemys
- Sinochelys
