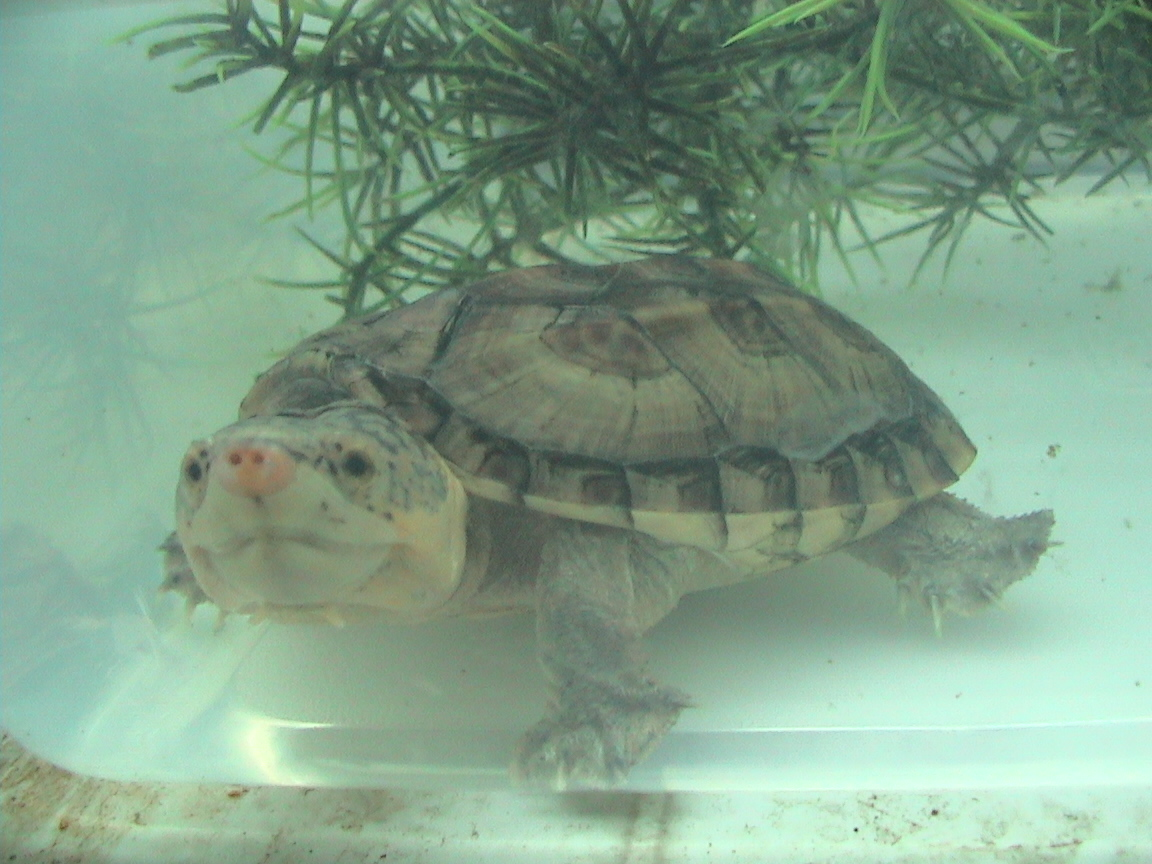
- Staurotypus salvinii in an aquarium

Conservation status
- Endangered (IUCN 3.1)
- CITES Appendix II

Scientific classification
- Kingdom: Animalia
- Phylum: Chordata
- Class: Reptilia
- Order: Testudines
- Suborder: Cryptodira
- Family: Kinosternidae
- Genus: Staurotypus
- Species: S. salvinii

Binomial name
- Staurotypus salvinii Gray, 1864

Synonyms
- Staurotypus (Stauremys) salvinii Gray, 1864; Stauremys salvinii — Gray, 1870; Staurotypus marmoratus Fischer, 1872; Claudius severus Cope, 1872; Staurotypus (Claudius) severus — Bocourt, 1876; Staurotypus salvini [sic] Günther, 1885 (ex errore); Staurotypus biporcatus Gadow, 1905 (nomen nudum); Staurotypus salvanii [sic] Beltrán, 1953 (ex errore)

= Giant musk turtle =

Species of turtle

The giant musk turtle (Staurotypus salvinii), also known commonly as the Chiapas giant musk turtle or the Mexican giant musk turtle, is a species of turtle in the family Kinosternidae. The species is found in Central America.

== Geographic range ==
S. salvinii is found in Belize, El Salvador, Guatemala, western Honduras, and Mexico (Chiapas and Oaxaca).

== Habitat ==
The giant musk turtle prefers to inhabit slow-moving bodies of freshwater such as reservoirs, and rivers with soft bottoms and ample vegetation.

== Etymology ==
The specific name, salvinii, honors English naturalist and herpetologist Osbert Salvin.

== Description ==
S. salvinii is typically much larger than other species of Kinosternidae, attaining a straight carapace length of up to 38 cm (15 inches), with males being significantly smaller than females. It is typically brown, black, or green in color, with a yellow underside. The carapace is distinguished by three distinct ridges, or keels which run its length. The giant musk turtle tends to be quite aggressive, agile and energetic.

S. salvinii exhibits XX/XY sex determination, in contrast to the temperature-dependent sex determination of most turtles.

== Diet ==
Like other musk turtle species, S. salvinii is carnivorous, eating various species of fishes, crustaceans, smaller turtles, insects, mollusks, and carrion. The giant musk turtle's feeding technique is to open its mouth rapidly leading to a powerful inrush of water which sucks the prey into its mouth.

== Reproduction ==
S. salvinii is oviparous.
