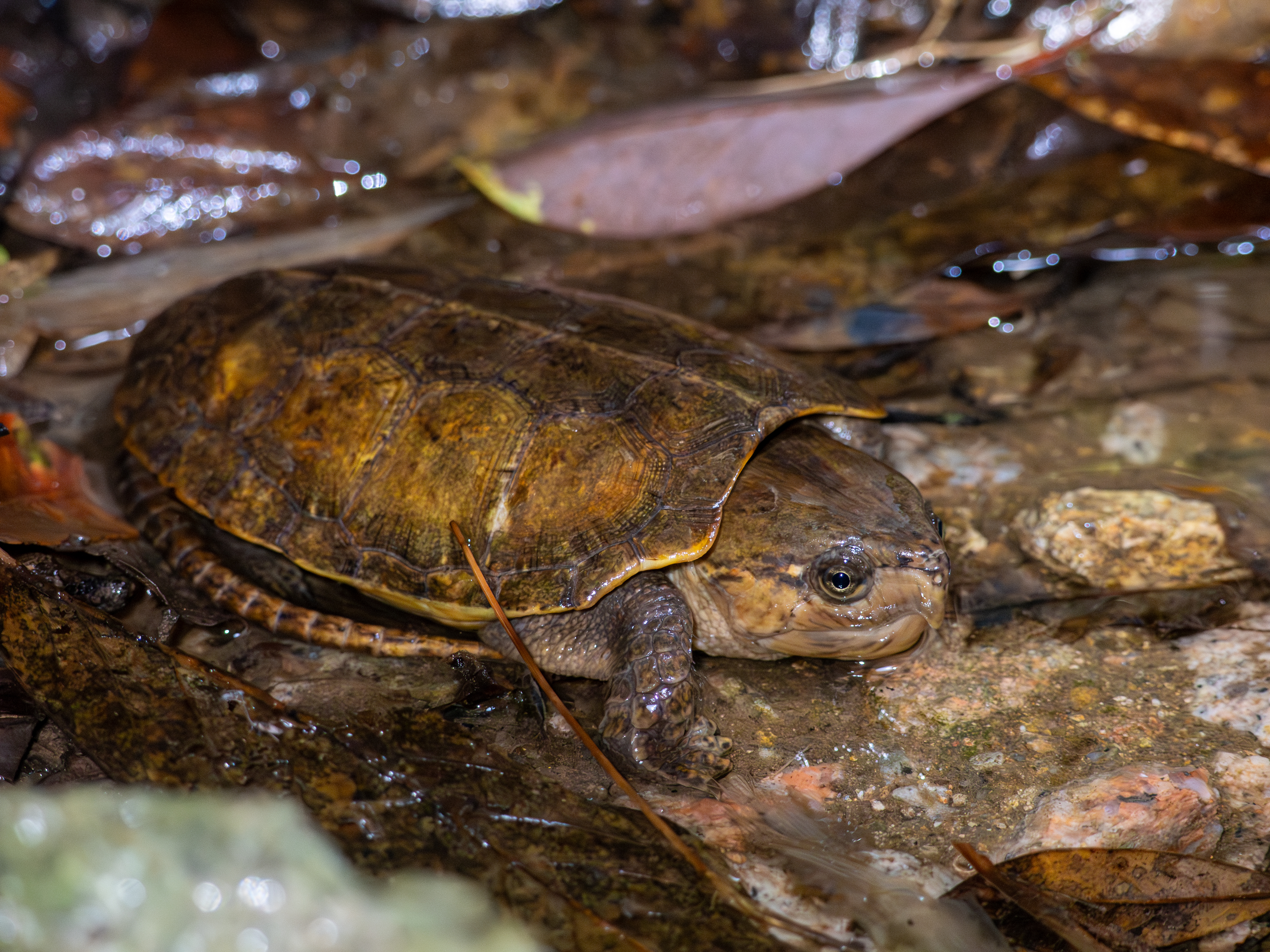
- A sub-adult Big-headed Turtle seen in Hong Kong

Conservation status
- Critically Endangered (IUCN 3.1)
- CITES Appendix I

Scientific classification
- Kingdom: Animalia
- Phylum: Chordata
- Class: Reptilia
- Order: Testudines
- Suborder: Cryptodira
- Superfamily: Testudinoidea
- Family: Platysternidae; Gray, 1869
- Genus: Platysternon; Gray, 1831
- Species: P. megacephalum

Binomial name
- Platysternon megacephalum Gray, 1831

Synonyms
- Platysternon megacephalum megacephalum: Platysternon megacephalum Gray, 1831; Platisternon megacephalus Gray, 1834; Platysternon megacephalus Gray, 1835; Emys megacephala Schlegel, 1838; Platysternon magacephalum Fitzinger, 1843 (ex errore); Platysternum megacephalum Boulenger, 1889; Platysternon platycephalum Mertens, 1959 (ex errore); Platysternum megalocephalum Stanek, 1959 (ex errore); Platysternon megacephalum megacephalum Wermuth, 1960; Platysternon magacephalum megacephalum Pritchard, 1979; Platysternon megacephalum tristernalis Schleich & Gruber, 1984; Platysternon megacephalum tristornalis Alderton, 1988 (ex errore); Platysternon megacephalum peguense: Platysternon peguense Gray, 1870; Platysternon megacephalum peguense Wermuth, 1960; Platysternon megacephalum vogeli Wermuth, 1969; Platysternon megacephalum penguense Nutaphand, 1979 (ex errore); Platysternon megacephalum penuense Nutaphand, 1979 (ex errore); Platysternon megacephalum peguensis Sharma, 1998 (ex errore); Platysternon megacephalum shiui: Platysternon megacephalum shiui Ernst & McCord, 1987

= Big-headed turtle =

Species of turtle

The big-headed turtle (Platysternon megacephalum) is a species of turtle in the family Platysternidae from Southeast Asia and southern China.

== Background ==
Previously considered a distinct family placed on occasion in "Kinosternoidea", it was later moved to the Emydidae. This, as well as the subfamily and the genus Platysternon, are monotypic.

The big-headed turtle is named after its disproportionately large head which leads to an inability to retreat into its shell. In order to protect itself it instead has an armored head and sharp beak.

== Distribution ==
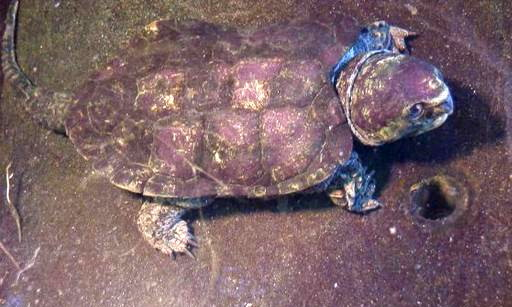
A captive adult big-headed turtle

The big-headed turtle is found in Cambodia, China, Laos, Myanmar, Thailand, and Vietnam. It is commonly found in fast flowing streams and waterfalls in rocky areas.

== Behaviour ==
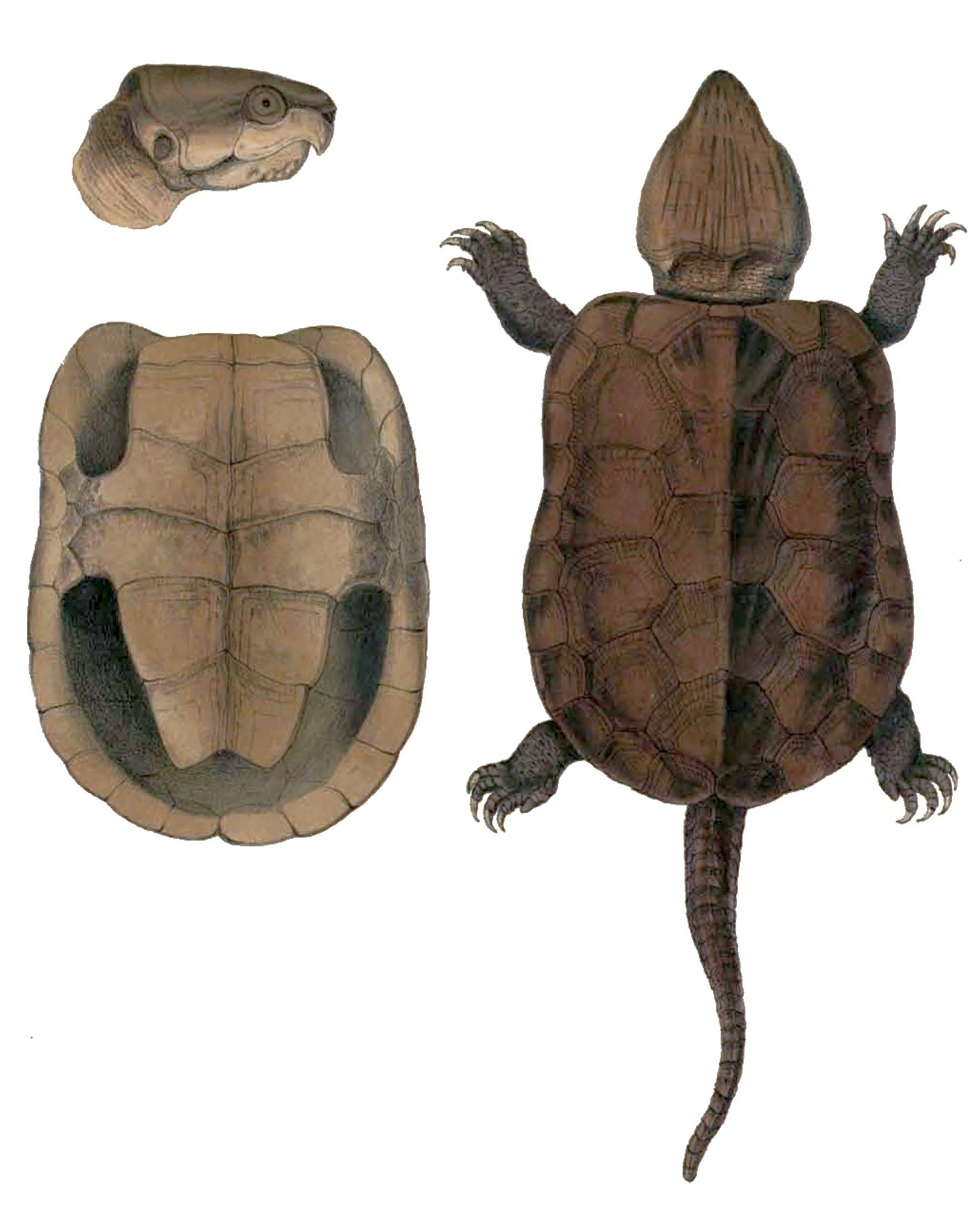
Illustration from Indian Zoology (1830–1834) by John Edward Gray

The big-headed turtle is known to readily climb over obstacles in and around rivers and fast streams, using its tail as a prop to extend the reach of its strong claws. It also uses its beak to assist in climbing. It has been reported to climb trees and bushes. These turtles generally move more during the night, and are not prone to moving long distances. They have a general daily range of 0-89.6m and males tend to move further than the females in this species. They are not strong swimmers, and when swimming, this species occasionally arches its tail in the manner of a scorpion. The big-headed turtle cannot pull its head in its shell. That being the case, it will not hesitate to use its powerful jaws to defend itself. Its diet consists of fish, snails and worms. It also tends to eat fruits like the Machilus spp., as well as insects, crabs and mollusks.

== Diet ==
Originally assumed to be strictly carnivorous, this appears to be an opportunistic feeder with a significant shift towards omnivory or herbivory. Using fecal matter, big-headed turtles are found to consume fruits (Machilus and Turpinia arguta), terrestrial insect adults/larva and aquatic larva (Coleoptera, Homoptera, Hymenoptera, Isoptera, Lepidoptera, Mantodea, Orthoptera, Diptera, Ephemeroptera, Odonata and Tricoptera), mollusks (Sulcospira hainanensis), frogs, rodents, and freshwater crabs. Their eating behavior changes depending on the environmental conditions, but predominantly consume fruits. Seeds partially digested were found to have increased germination success after turtle excretion, possibly connecting their frugivore habits to environmental conditions.

== Exploitation ==
The big-headed turtle is found quite frequently in illegal wildlife trade. It is readily consumed in Asia and is frequently a market item. Hunters capture them on lines with baited straight pins, so this species is rapidly disappearing in the wild. The species is also threatened by its use in the pet trade.

== Subspecies ==
- P. m. megacephalum, China, 1831
- P. m. peguense, Myanmar and Thailand, 1870
- P. m. shiui, Cambodia, Laos and Vietnam, 1987

In addition, two other subspecies, P. m. tristernalis (1984) and P. m. vogeli (1969), have been given, but may be invalid.

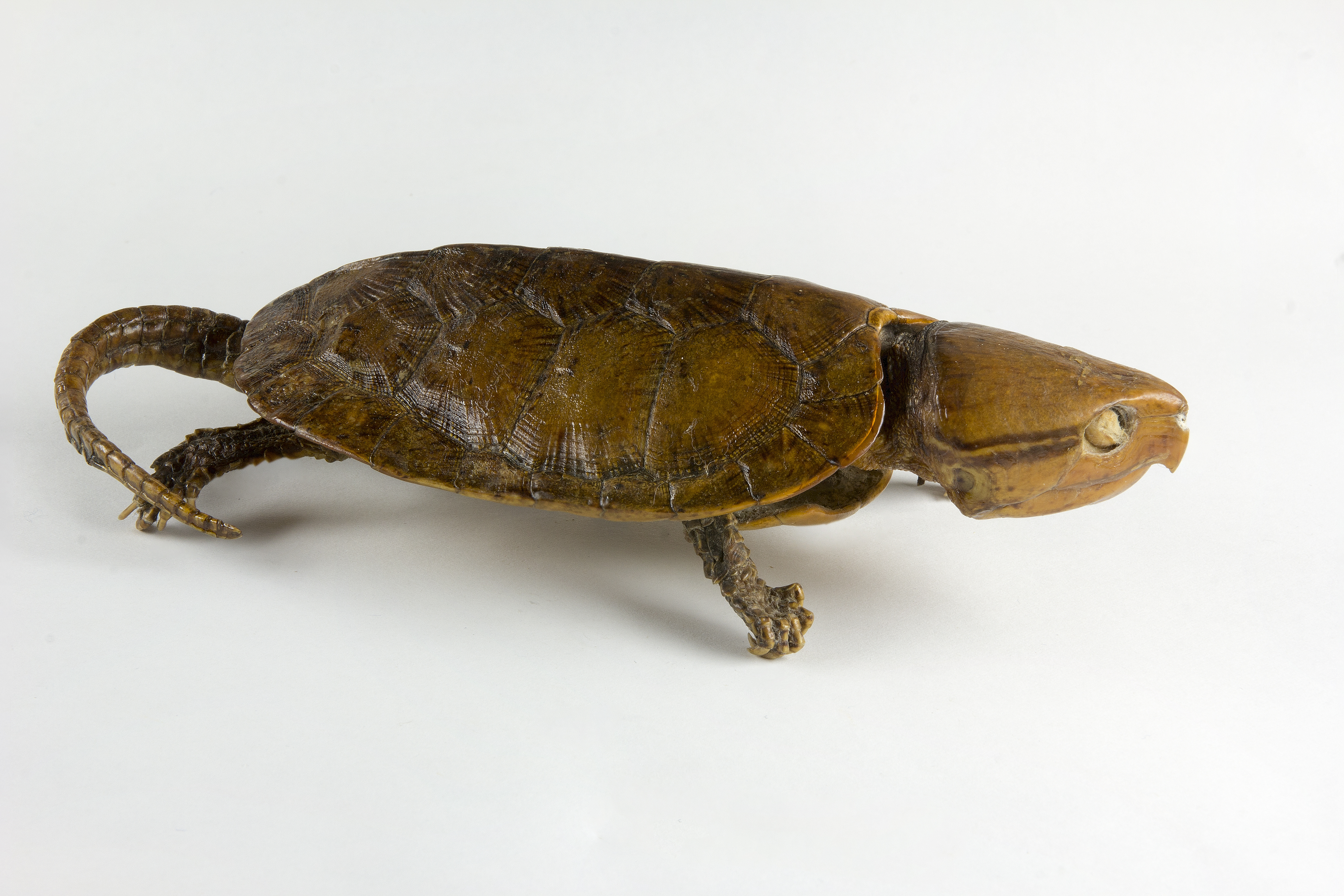
Platysternon megacephalum - MHNT
