= Haichemys =

Haichemys Temporal range: Late Cretaceous (Maastrichtian), ~70 Ma

Scientific classification
- Kingdom: Animalia
- Phylum: Chordata
- Class: Reptilia
- Order: Testudines
- Suborder: Cryptodira
- Family: †Haichemydidae; Sukhanov and Narmandakh, 2006
- Genus: †Haichemys; Sukhanov and Narmandakh, 2006

Type species
- †Haichemys ulensis Sukhanov and Narmandakh, 2006

Extinct genus of turtles

Haichemys is an extinct genus of turtles that lived during the Late Cretaceous period in what is now Mongolia. It was first described in 2006 and placed into the family Haichemydidae, of which it is the only genus. The validity of Haichemys has been questioned, with a study published in 2013 finding it likely that all known fossils of it actually represent hatchlings of Mongolemys elegans, though this cannot be conclusively proven until specimens preserving both the skull and shell are found.

Haichemys are suggested to have had durophagous diet from surrounding carbonaceous claystone found in swamps and lakes.
