= Glenn Flores =

American pediatrician and researcher

- Born: Glenn Flores
- Education: Harvard College (A.B.); University of California, San Francisco School of Medicine (M.D.)
- Occupations: Pediatrician, Professor, Health Services Researcher
- Employer: University of Miami Miller School of Medicine
- Known for: Research on health equity, racial and ethnic disparities in child health, and public policy in pediatrics
- Title: Professor and Chair of Pediatrics, Senior Associate Dean of Child Health, George E. Batchelor Endowed Chair in Child Health

Glenn Flores is an American pediatrician, health-services researcher, and child-health advocate. He is Professor and Chair of Pediatrics, Senior Associate Dean of Child Health, and the George E. Batchelor Endowed Chair in Child Health at the University of Miami Miller School of Medicine. His work focuses on health equity, racial and ethnic disparities, language barriers in healthcare, and child-health policy.

== Early life and education ==
Flores received his undergraduate degree from Harvard College. He initially pursued a career in zoology, publishing several articles describing new species of frogs, and on lizard ecology. A frog species, Pristimantis floridus, was later named after him by colleagues. He earned his M.D. from the University of California, San Francisco School of Medicine. He completed his pediatric residency at Weill Cornell Medicine/NewYork-Presbyterian Hospital, and a fellowship in the Robert Wood Johnson Clinical Scholars Program at Yale University School of Medicine.

== Career ==
Flores was assistant and then associate professor of pediatrics and public health at Boston Medical Center and Boston University School of Medicine from 1995-2002. In 2002, Flores moved to the Medical College of Wisconsin as a tenured associate professor of pediatrics, where he also directed the Center for the Advancement of Underserved Children, and was promoted to full professor. From 2007-2015, Flores was Director of the Division of General Pediatrics, Professor of Pediatrics, and the Judith and Charles Ginsburg Endowed Chair in Pediatrics at University of Texas Southwestern Medical Center and Children's Medical Center Dallas. He then was the Distinguished Chair of Health Policy Research at the Medica Research Institute from 2015-2017, followed by Professor of Pediatrics, Chief Research Officer, and Vice Chair of Research at Connecticut Children's Medical Center and in the University of Connecticut School of Medicine Department of Pediatrics until 2021.

In 2021, Flores became Chair of Pediatrics, Senior Associate Dean of Child Health, the George E. Batchelor Endowed Chair in Child Health, Director of the Batchelor Children's Research Institute, and tenured Professor of Pediatrics, Public Health Sciences, and Psychiatry and Behavioral Health Sciences at the University of Miami School of Medicine. He is PI and founding Director of the National Institute of Diabetes and Digestive and Kidney Diseases-funded Academic Pediatric Association Research in Academic Pediatrics Investigator Development (RAPID) Program, which also includes partnerships with the American Pediatric Society, American Board of Pediatrics, and Pediatric Infectious Diseases Society.

Based on his Eunice Kennedy Shriver National Institute of Child Health and Human Development-funded research, Flores drafted 2018 federal legislation that was part of the Children’s Health Insurance Program (CHIP) reauthorization, making organizations using parent mentors eligible for $120 million in Centers for Medicare & Medicaid Services grants for Medicaid and CHIP outreach and enrollment, resulting in programs in 11 states and the Cherokee Nation.

He has held advisory or leadership roles with the United States Preventive Services Task Force, American Pediatric Society, Institute of Medicine (now the National Academy of Medicine), Centers for Disease Control and Prevention, and American Medical Association.

== Research and publications ==
Flores's research is centered on racial and ethnic disparities in children’s health, health equity, language barriers in health care, childhood obesity, social determinants of health, and health policy, which have been cited over 22,600 times. He also published a series of narrative essays on severely ill children. His research has been funded by the National Institute of Child Health and Human Development, National Institute of Diabetes and Digestive and Kidney Diseases, Agency for Healthcare Research and Quality, Centers for Medicare & Medicaid Services, Robert Wood Johnson Foundation, and Commonwealth Fund.

== Advocacy and public service ==
Flores has provided briefings and testimony before the United States Senate, United States House of Representatives, and Department of Health and Human Services, and served as a consultant to the United States Department of Health and Human Services Office for Civil Rights and Surgeon General of the United States. He has also served as a consultant for the Sesame Workshop, and as a member of the National Advisory Committee of the RWJ Health Opportunity and Equity (HOPE) Measures and "Cradle to K Cabinet" for Minneapolis Mayor Betsy Hodges.

== Honors and awards ==
- American Academy of Pediatrics Outstanding Achievement Award in Epidemiology (2006)
- Millie and Richard Brock Award (2008)
- Helen Rodríguez-Trías Social Justice Award, American Public Health Association (APHA) (2010)
- Academic Pediatric Association (APA) Research Award (2012) and Public Policy & Advocacy Award (2017)
- David P. Rall Award for Advocacy in Public Health, APHA (2019)
- Miller-Sarkin Mentoring Holistic Award, APA (2023)
- David G. Nichols Health Equity Award, American Pediatric Society (2024)
- Reinhardt Distinguished Career Award, AcademyHealth (2024)

== Selected publications ==
- Flores G. The impact of medical interpreter services on the quality of health care: a systematic review. Med Care Res Rev. 2005 Jun;62(3):255-99. doi: 10.1177/1077558705275416. PMID 15894705.
- Flores G. Language barriers to health care in the United States. N Engl J Med. 2006 Jul 20;355(3):229-31. doi: 10.1056/NEJMp058316. PMID 16855260.
- Flores G. Intensive care. J Emerg Med. 1992 May-Jun;10(3):377-80. doi:10.1016/0736-4679(92)90347-v. PMID 1624752.
- Flores G, Abreu M, Barone CP, Bachur R, Lin H. Errors of medical interpretation and their potential clinical consequences: a comparison of professional versus ad hoc versus no interpreters. Ann Emerg Med. 2012 Nov;60(5):545-53. doi: 10.1016/j.annemergmed.2012.01.025. Epub 2012 Mar 15. PMID 22424655.
- Flores G, Bauchner H, Feinstein AR, Nguyen US. The impact of ethnicity, family income, and parental education on children's health and use of health services. Am J Public Health. 1999 Jul;89(7):1066-71. doi: 10.2105/ajph.89.7.1066. PMID 10394317; PMCID: PMC1508855.
- Flores G, Bridon C, Torres S, Perez R, Walter T, Brotanek J, Lin H, Tomany-Korman S. Improving asthma outcomes in minority children: a randomized, controlled trial of parent mentors. Pediatrics. 2009 Dec;124(6):1522-32. doi: 10.1542/peds.2009-0230. PMID 19948624.

== Selected memberships ==
- National Advisory Committee, RWJ Amos Medical Faculty Development Program
- Research Committee and Engagement Committee (Co-Chair), Association of Medical School Pediatric Department Chairs
- Editorial Board, Journal of Health Care for the Poor and Underserved
