= Richard Vogt (herpetologist) =

American herpetologist based in Brazil (1949–2021)

- Born: August 6, 1949
- Died: January 17, 2021 (aged 71); Manaus, Brazil
- Known for: Herpetology

Richard Carl Vogt (August 6, 1949 – January 17, 2021) was an American herpetologist based in Brazil. He was the director of the Centro de Estudos de Quelônios da Amazônia (Center for the Study of Amazonian Turtles) at the National Institute of Amazonian Research (INPA).

== Career ==
Vogt received his PhD in 1978 from the University of Wisconsin-Madison, his dissertation focused on the systematics and ecology of the false map turtle (Graptemys pseudogeographica). The same year, he became a Postdoctoral Fellow at Carnegie Museum of Natural History in Pittsburgh.

In March 2000, Wildlife Conservation magazine wrote about Vogt's work in his role as Curator of reptiles and amphibians for the Museum of INPA in Manaus. At the time, his research was focused on working with communities in Mamirauá to monitor and safeguard the population levels of both the six-tubercled Amazon River turtle (Podocnemis sextuberculata) and the yellow-headed sideneck turtle (Podocnemis unifilis).

In 2013, Vogt was part of a group of authors who published a paper in the Journal of Comparative Psychology that described findings which they considered to be the "...first evidence of acoustic communication mediating posthatching parental care in chelonians." The vocalization study focused on recordings of the acoustic behavior of the Arrau turtle (Podocnemis expansa) as both hatchlings and adult turtles, with the theory that these sounds assist in synchronised hatching and emergence, and in the hatchlings' seeking of female turtle attention to accompany them during migration. In 2017, this research was expanded to show that the pig-nosed turtle (Carettochelys insculpta) also emits underwater sounds.

In 2006, Vogt was part of the assessment panel which determined the critically endangered status of the Central American river turtle (Dermatemys mawii). Similarly in 2016, he assisted in assessing the critically endangered status of Hoge's side-necked turtle (Messoclemmys hogei).

== Awards and recognition ==
In 2014, the impact of Vogt's research was highlighted when he was awarded the 9th Annual 2014 Behler Turtle Conservation Award. The Award is presented in memory of herpetologist John L. Behler.

In May 2018, a newly identified endangered Mexican turtle species, Kinosternon vogti, was named for Vogt, to honour his more than 40 years in the field, scientific impact and mentorship of younger scientists.

In July 2018, Vogt received the Distinguished Herpetologist Award at the Joint Meeting of Ichthyologists and Herpetologists by the Herpetologists' League. During his acceptance address, several images of "scantily clad female students" in his presentation were covered up by conference staff without informing Vogt, and the photographs were criticized by other members in attendance. In response to the controversy, the Herpetologist's League rescinded Vogt's award due to the inappropriate images and the rumors of him behaving inappropriately toward colleagues, and instituted a new diversity and inclusion committee. Vogt did not respond to allegations concerning his behavior, but said that the interference of his slides "made matters worse by suggesting to people that there was something wrong with the material".

== Books ==
- Vogt, Richard C. (1981). Natural history of amphibians and reptiles in Wisconsin. Milwaukee: Milwaukee Public Museum.
- Tait, Noel; Vogt, Richard C.; Dingle, Hugh (consultants) (2006). The encyclopedia of reptiles, amphibians & invertebrates: a complete visual guide. San Francisco: Fog City Press. Republished in 2014.
- Vogt, Richard C. (2008). Amazon turtles. Manaus: Instituto Nacional de Pesquisas da Amazônia (INPA).
- Legler, John M.; Vogt, Richard C. (2013). The turtles of Mexico: land and freshwater forms. Berkeley: University of California Press.
