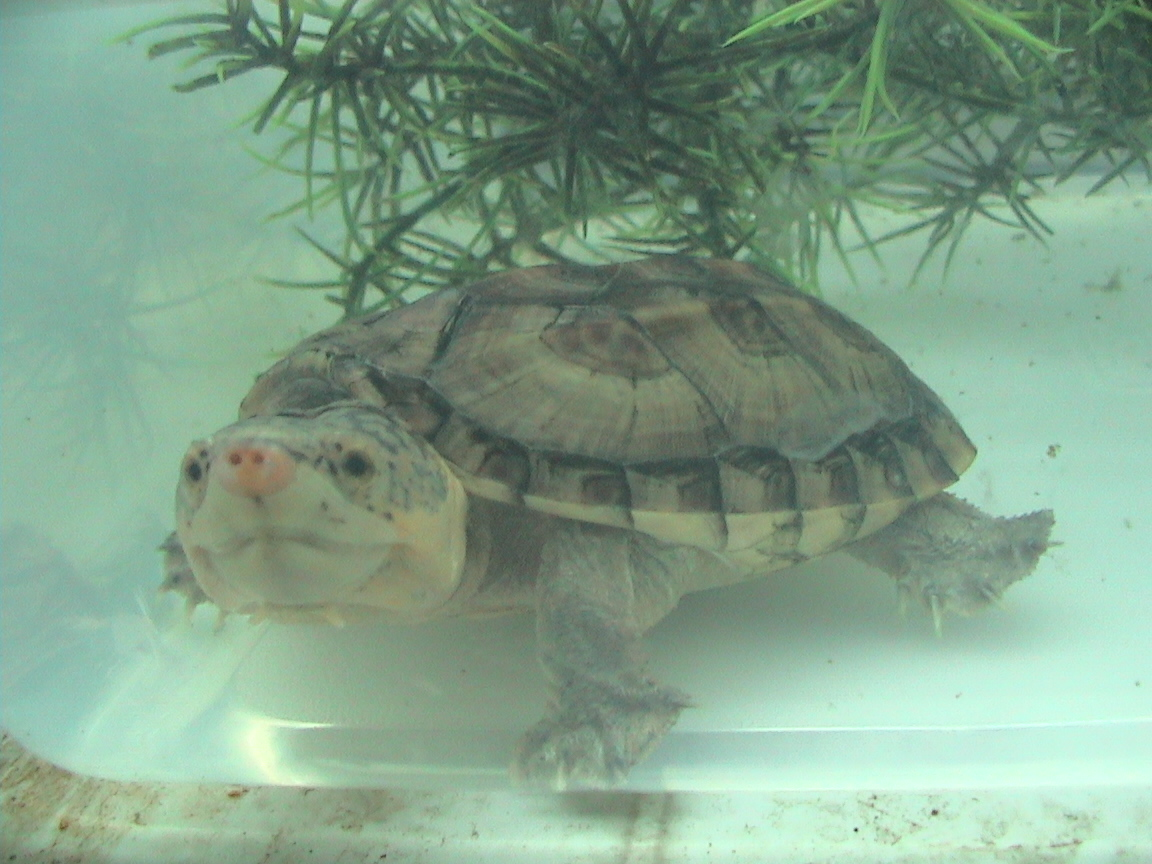
- Staurotypus salvinii (Chiapas giant musk turtle or giant musk turtle)

Scientific classification
- Kingdom: Animalia
- Phylum: Chordata
- Class: Reptilia
- Order: Testudines
- Suborder: Cryptodira
- Family: Kinosternidae
- Subfamily: Staurotypinae
- Genus: Staurotypus; Wagler, 1830

= Staurotypus =

Genus of turtles

Staurotypus is a genus of aquatic turtles, commonly known as giant musk turtles, Mexican musk turtles, or three-keeled musk turtles, in the family Kinosternidae. The genus contains two recognized species, which are endemic to Mexico and Central America. Both species are sold and bred as pets.

== Species ==
The following two species are recognized as being valid.

- Staurotypus salvinii Gray, 1864 – Chiapas giant musk turtle, giant musk turtle, Pacific coast giant musk turtle
- Staurotypus triporcatus (Wiegmann, 1828) – Mexican musk turtle, Giant Mexican musk turtle

== Geographic distribution ==
Both species of the genus Staurotypus are native to Mexico and Central America. S. salvinii is found primarily in Mexico, in the states of Oaxaca and Chiapas, but ranges south into Guatemala, El Salvador, and Belize. S. triporcatus is also found primarily in Mexico, and is more widespread, found in the states of Veracruz, Tabasco, Chiapas, Yucatán, and Campeche, and ranges south into Belize, Guatemala, and Honduras.

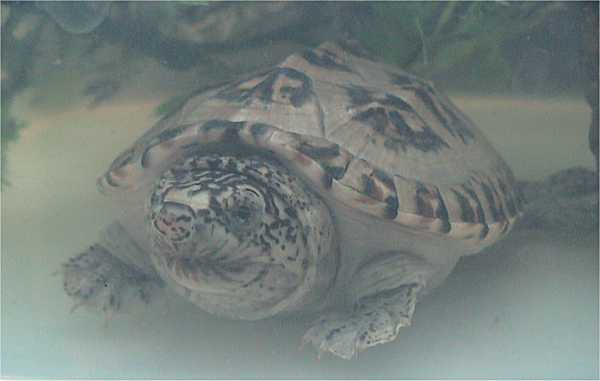
Staurotypus triporcatus (Mexican musk turtle or narrow-bridged musk turtle)

== Description ==
Species in the genus Staurotypus are typically much larger than other species of Kinosternidae, attaining a straight carapace length of up to 36 cm (14 in), with males being significantly smaller than females. Typically brown, black, or green in color, with yellow undersides, the carapace is distinguished by three distinct ridges, or keels, which run the length.

Staurotypus turtles exhibit XX/XY sex determination, in contrast to the temperature-dependent sex determination of most turtles.

== Diet ==
Like other musk turtle species, Staurotypus are omnivorous, eating various types of aquatic invertebrates, as well as fish and carrion.
