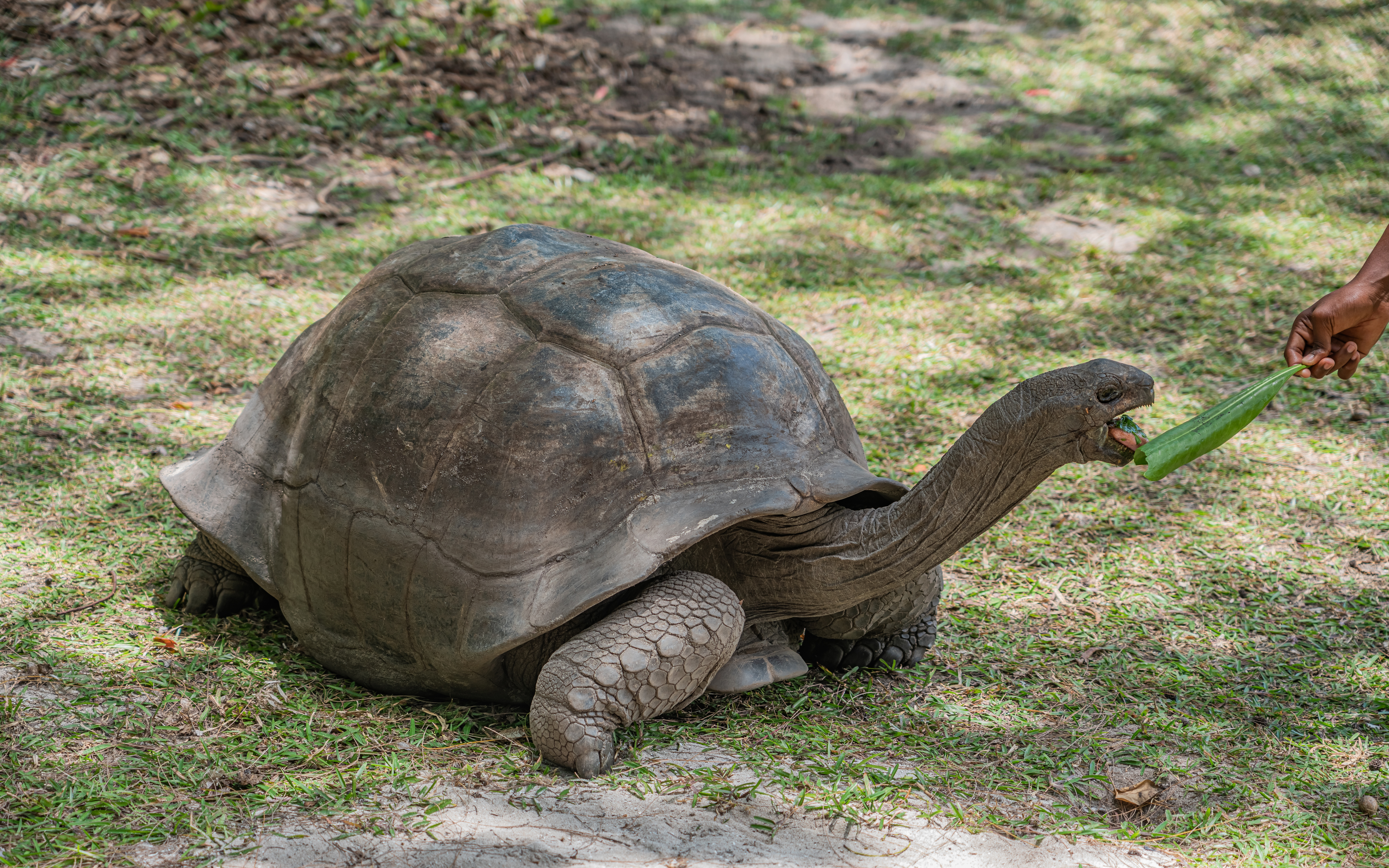
- Aldabra giant tortoise (Aldabrachelys gigantea)

Scientific classification
- Kingdom: Animalia
- Phylum: Chordata
- Class: Reptilia
- Order: Testudines
- Suborder: Cryptodira; Cope, 1868

Subgroups
- See text

Synonyms
- Cryptoderes Duméril and Bibron, 1834; Cryptodera Lichtenstein, 1856; Cryptodira Cope, 1868; Cryptodiramorpha Lee, 1995; Pancryptodira Joyce, Parham, and Gauthier, 2004

= Cryptodira =

Cryptodira Temporal range: Late Jurassic –Present

Suborder of reptiles

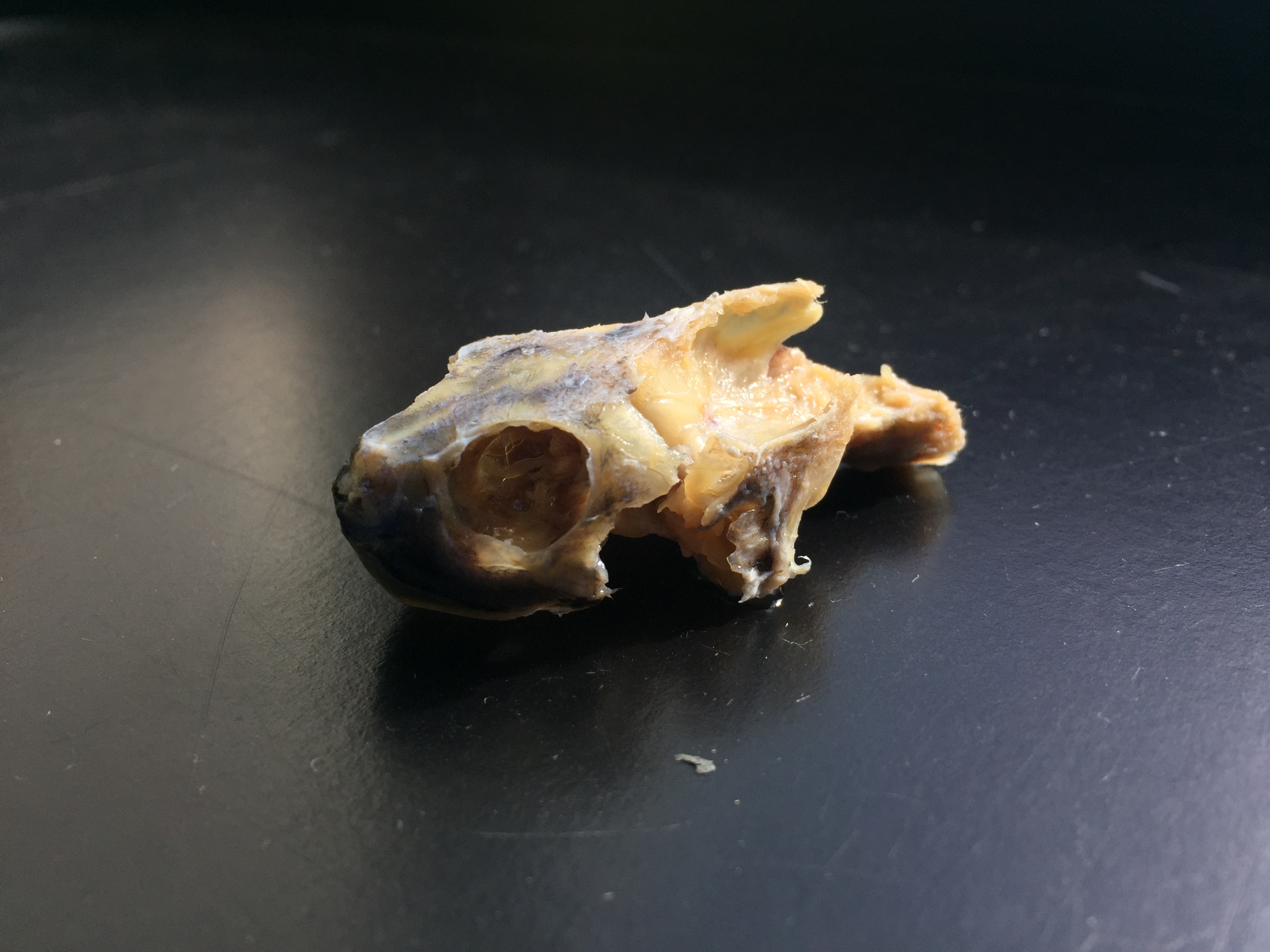
Skull of a cryptodiran turtle from the family Emydidae

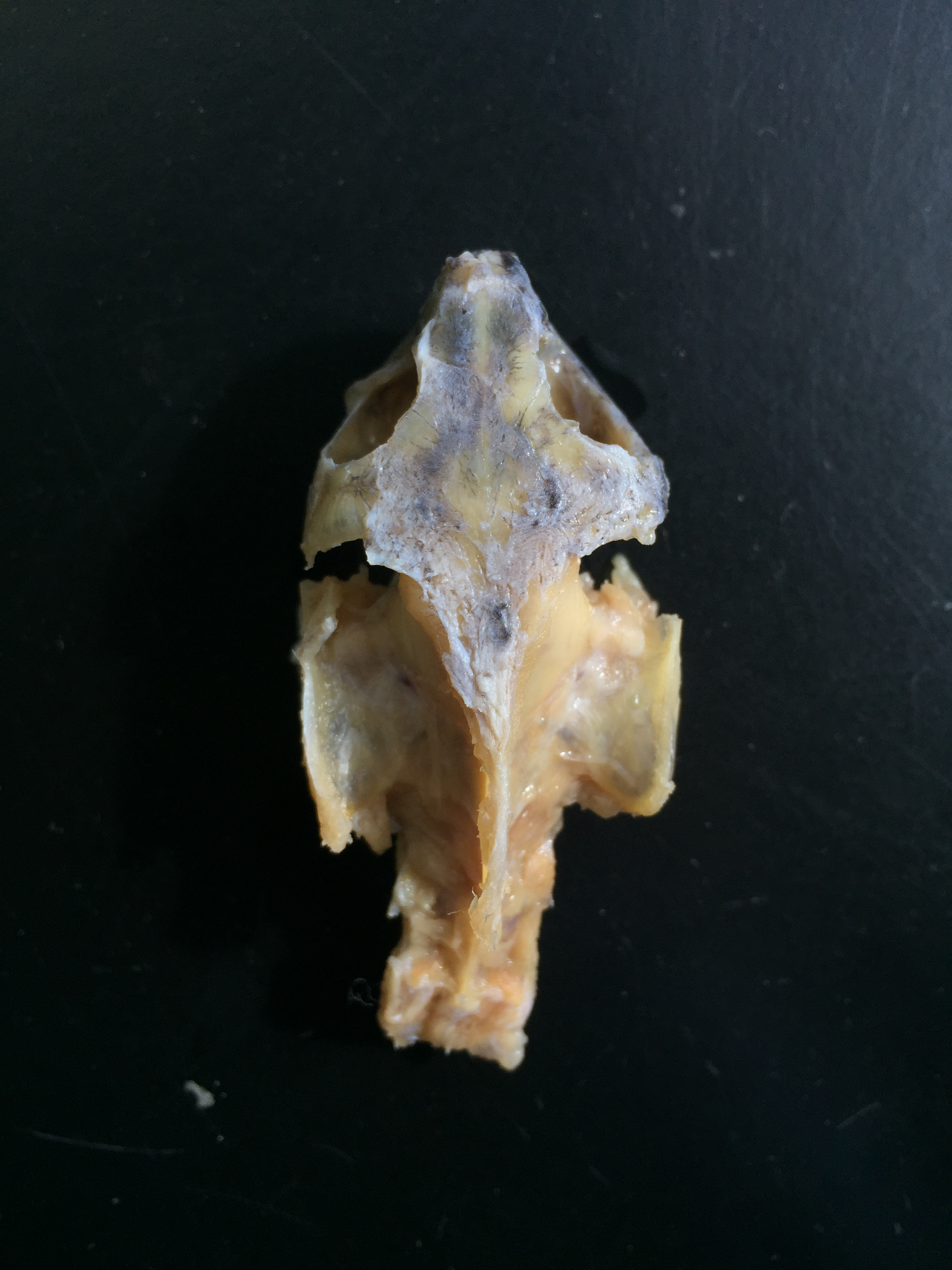
Dorsal view of skull and cervical vertebrae of a cryptodiran turtle from the family Emydidae. Not all cervical vertebrae are featured due to the dissection cut.

The Cryptodira (Greek: hidden neck) are a suborder of Testudines that includes most living tortoises and turtles. Cryptodira is commonly called the hidden-necked turtles or the typical turtles. Cryptodira differ from Pleurodira (side-necked turtles) in that they lower their necks and pull the heads straight back into the shells, instead of folding their necks sideways along the body under the shells' marginals. They include among their species freshwater turtles, snapping turtles, tortoises, softshell turtles, and sea turtles.

== Neck retraction ==
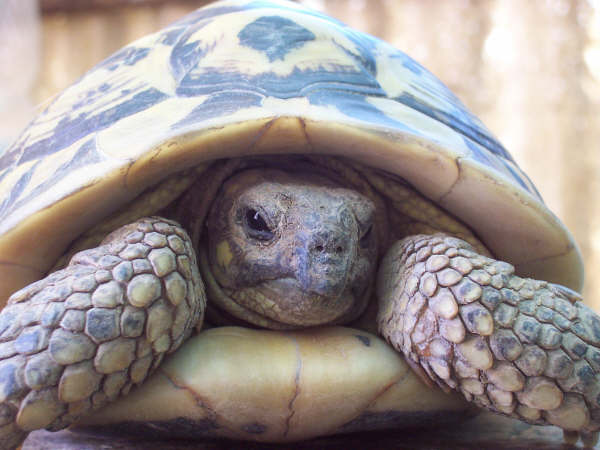
Testudo hermanni showing typical cryptodiran neck retraction, in which the head is retracted straight backwards into its shell.

The Cryptodira are characterized by retraction of the head in the vertical plane, which permits for primarily vertical movements and restricted lateral movements outside of the shell. These motions are largely due to the morphology and arrangement of cervical vertebrae. In all recent turtles, the cervical column consists of nine joints and eight vertebrae. Compared to the narrow vertebrae and the closely positioned zygapophyses of the pleurodires, the cryptodires' vertebrae take on the opposite shape. Their cervical vertebrae are more distended, and their zygapophyses (processes that interlock adjacent vertebrae) are much more widely spaced—features allowing for a condition called ginglymoidy, and ultimately, their "hidden" neck retraction. Ginglymoidy refers to the double articulation where articulation between the sixth and seventh vertebrae and the seventh and eighth vertebrae allows for bending of the neck into an S shape. Formation of this S shape occurs in one plane that enables retraction into the shell.

A comparison of cryptodiran neck retraction compared to Pleurodiran neck retraction.

Cryptodiran neck retraction is also dependent on associated cervical musculature for its characteristic motions. A study that focused solely on the mechanism of neck retraction in Chelodina (pleurodire) versus that of Apalone (cryptodire), found an absence of the longissimus and iliocostalis systems and reduced epaxial musculature. Absence of longissimus musculature, which primarily functions in moving the neck via ipsilateral flexion and contralateral rotation, contributes to the backwards retraction of the neck into the shell. Lack of this muscular system also results in poorly developed transverse processes (the lateral processes of a vertebra), forcing them to be developed in a more cranial direction. The iliocostalis system, used for lateral flexion and extension of the vertebral column, is commonly absent in all turtles. With the presence of a shell, these muscular movements are no longer possible. Epaxial musculature that functions in alternated forms of stepping and walking is minimized in turtles, due to their restricted stride lengths and heavily weighted shells.

== Systematics and evolution ==
Cryptodires evolved from pleurodires during the early Jurassic period, originating from South America and Southeast Asia. This split corresponds with the breakup of the supercontinent Pangaea. By the end of the Jurassic, cryptodires had almost completely replaced pleurodires in the lakes and rivers, while beginning to develop land-based species. Meanwhile, pleurodires became the dominant freshwater testudines in the Cretaceous to Eocene of Europe, and produced a family of marine species, the Bothremydidae.

The Cryptodira suborder has four living superfamilies, the Chelonioidea (sea turtles), Testudinoidea (tortoises and pond turtles), Kinosternoidea (Central American river turtle and mud turtles) and Trionychoidea (soft-shell turtles and relatives). Chelydridae (snapping turtles) form a sister group to Kinosternoidea. The former three subfamilies (and Chelydridae) are classified in the clade Durocryptodira, while the latter is classified in the clade Trionychia. These two clades likely diverged in the middle of the Jurassic.

Two circumscriptions of the Cryptodira are commonly found. One is used here; it includes a number of primitive extinct lineages known only from fossils, as well as the Eucryptodira. These are, in turn, made up from some very basal groups, and the Centrocryptodira contain the prehistoric relatives of the living cryptodires, as well as the latter, which are collectively called Polycryptodira or Durocryptodira.

The alternate concept restricts the use of the term "Cryptodira" to the crown clade (i.e. Polycryptodira). The Cryptodira as understood here are called Cryptodiramorpha in this view. A recent study placed Plesiochelyidae as an Angolachelonia and outside Testudines, thus Cryptodira.

As per the system used here, the Cryptodira can be classified as:

- †Hangaiemys
- †Bashuchelyidae
- Pan-Cryptodira
  - Family †Macrobaenidae? Sukhanov 1964
  - Family †Xinjiangchelyidae? Nesov, 1990
  - Family †Sinemydidae? Yeh, 1963
  - Clade Pandurocryptodira
    - Clade Americhelydia
      - Clade Chelydroidea
        - Family Chelydridae (snapping turtles)
        - Superfamily Kinosternoidea
          - Family Dermatemydidae (river turtles)
          - Family Kinosternidae (mud turtles)
      - Clade Panchelonioidea
        - Clade †Angolachelonia?
          - Clade †Thalassochelydia?
            - Family †Eurysternidae?
            - Family †Plesiochelyidae?
            - Family †Thalassemydidae?
            - †Owadowia?
          - Family †Sandownidae? (may also belong in Thalassochelydia)
        - Family †Protostegidae? (may also belong in Thalassochelydia)
        - Family †Toxochelyidae
        - Family †Ctenochelyidae
        - Superfamily Chelonioidea (sea turtles)
          - Family Cheloniidae (green sea turtles and relatives)
          - Family Dermochelyidae (leatherback sea turtles)
    - Clade Pantestudinoidea
      - Family †Lindholmemydidae?
      - Superfamily Testudinoidea
        - Family †Haichemydidae
        - Family †Sinochelyidae
        - Clade Emysternia
          - Family Platysternidae (big-headed turtle)
          - Family Emydidae (pond, box and water turtles)
        - Clade Testuguria
          - Family Geoemydidae (Asian river turtles, Asian leaf turtles, Asian box turtles and roofed turtles)
          - Family Testudinidae (tortoises)
  - Clade Pantrionychia
    - Clade †Adocusia
      - Family †Adocidae
      - Family †Nanhsiungchelyidae
    - Superfamily Trionychia
      - Family Carettochelyidae (pignose turtles)
      - Family Trionychidae (softshell turtles)
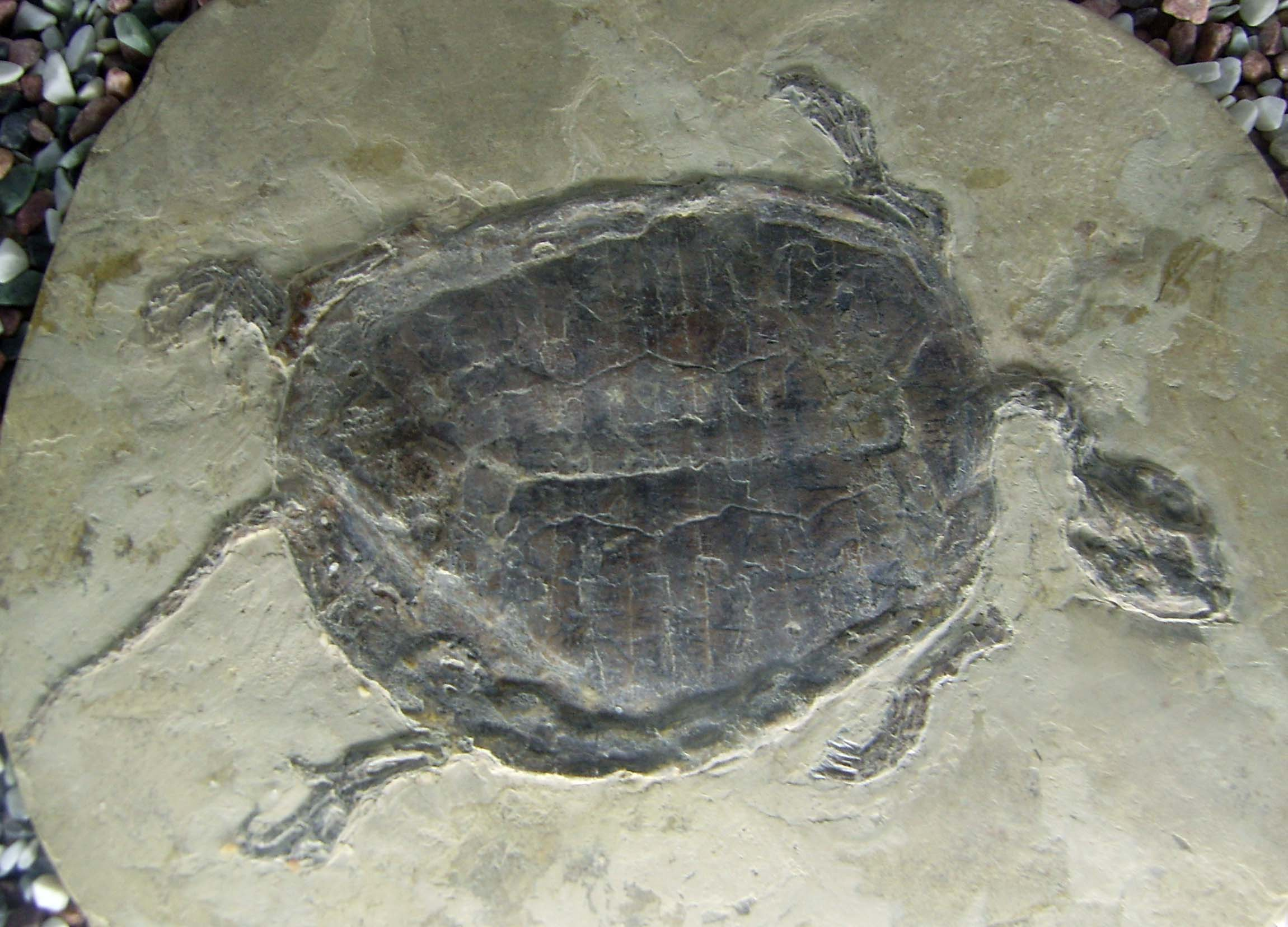
Ordosemys liaoxiensis was a member of Sinemydidae.

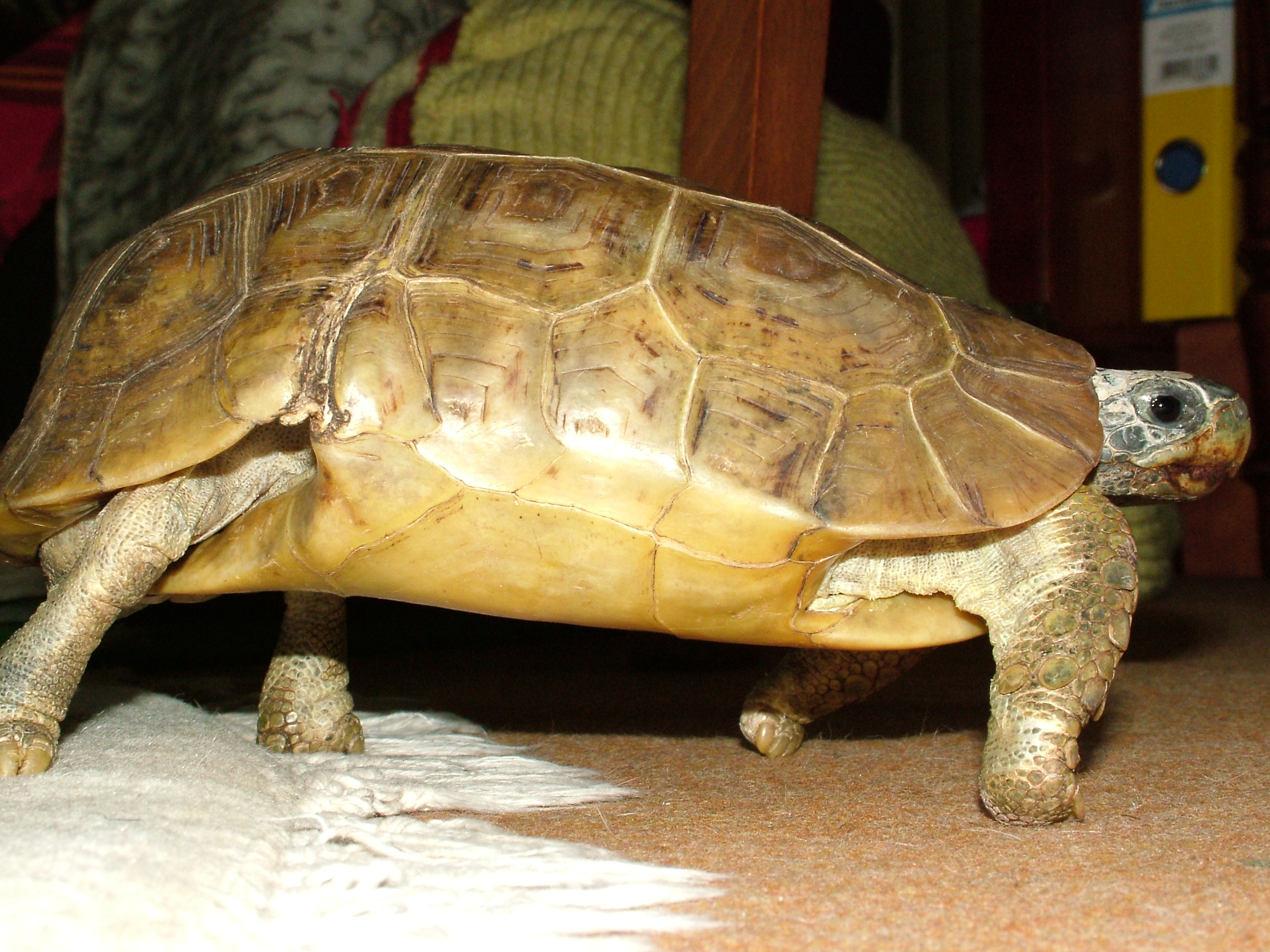
Kinixys belliana from the Testudinidae

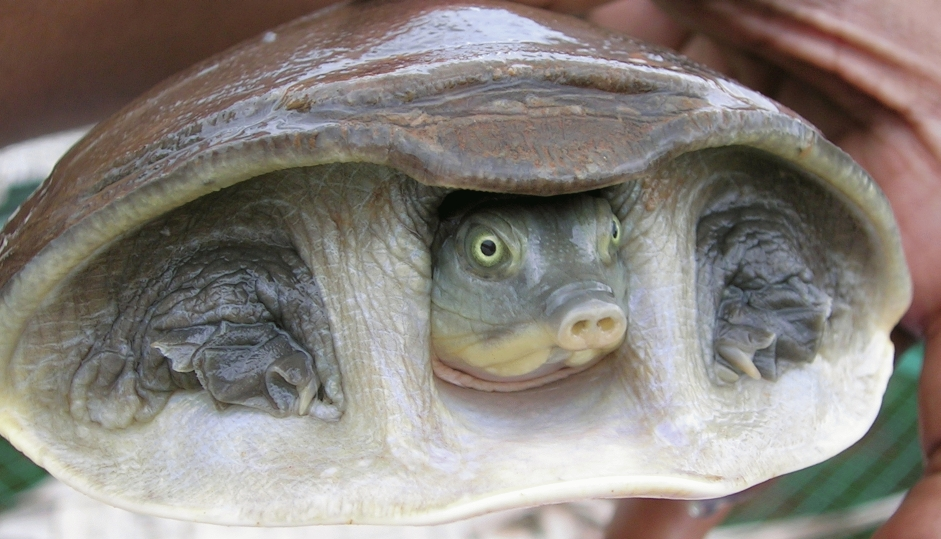
The Indian flapshell turtle (Lissemys punctata) from the Trionychidae is a highly advanced eucryptodire.

== Distribution ==
- Trionychidae (softshell turtles) are found from North America, Africa, South and East Asia to New Guinea.
- Kinosternidae (mud and musk turtles) are found from eastern North America to the Amazon drainage of South America.
- Dermatemydidae (Mesoamerican river turtles) are found in the Caribbean-Gulf drainage of Mesoamerica.
- Emydidae (cooters, sliders, American box turtles, and Allies) are found from Europe to Ural Mountains and North America southward to Eastern Brazil.
