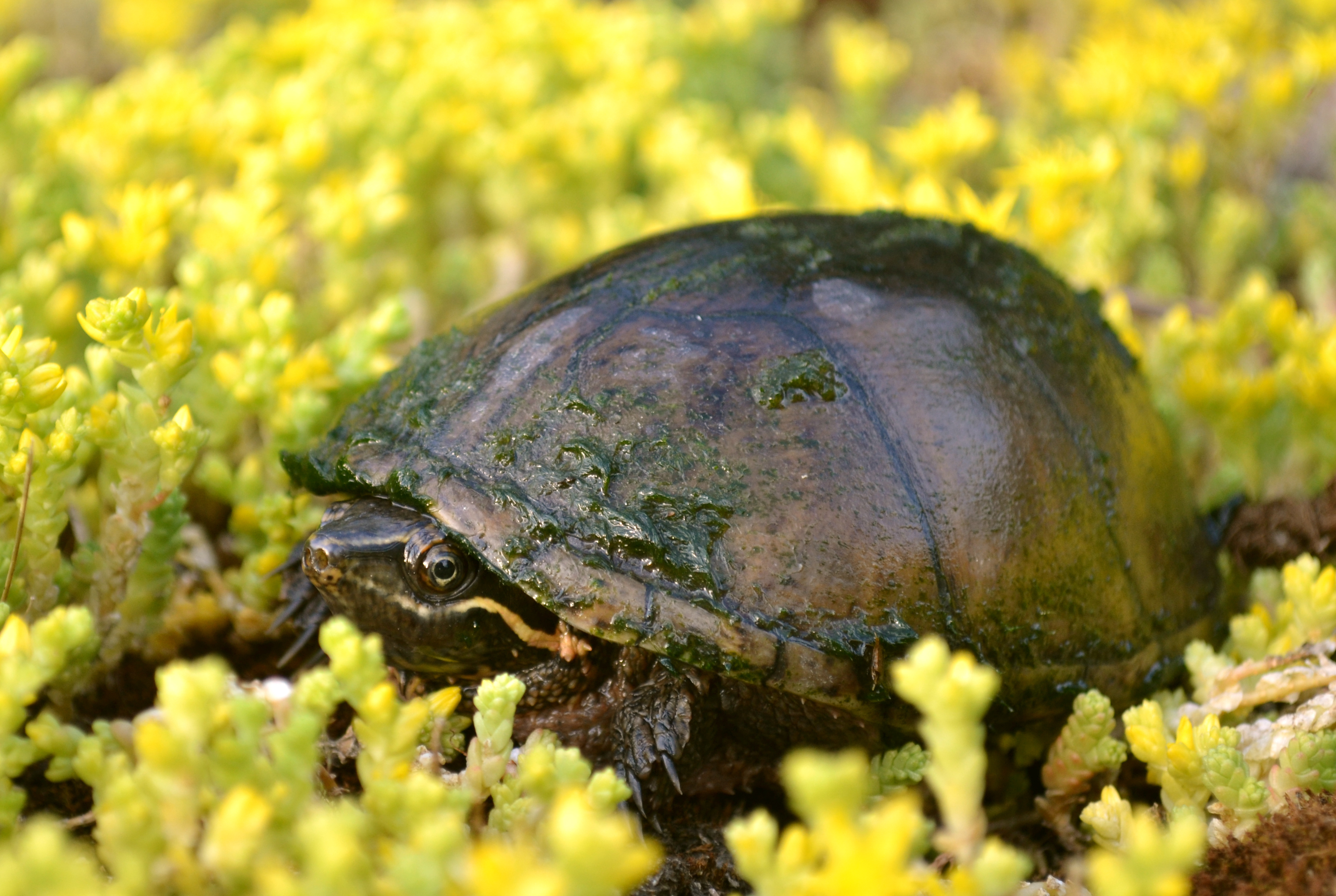
- In Ontario

Conservation status
- Least Concern (IUCN 3.1)

- Secure (NatureServe)

Scientific classification
- Kingdom: Animalia
- Phylum: Chordata
- Class: Reptilia
- Order: Testudines
- Suborder: Cryptodira
- Family: Kinosternidae
- Genus: Sternotherus
- Species: S. odoratus

Binomial name
- Sternotherus odoratus (Latreille in Sonnini & Latreille, 1801)

Synonyms
- List: Testudo odorata Latreille, 1801; Testudo glutinata Daudin, 1801; Emys odorata — Schweigger, 1812; Emys glutinata — Merrem, 1820; Terrapene boscii Merrem, 1820; Terrapene odorata — Merrem, 1820; Cistuda odorata — Say, 1825; Sternotherus odorata — Gray, 1825; Sternothaerus boscii — Bell, 1825; Sternothaerus odoratus — Bell, 1825; Clemmys glutinata — Ritgen, 1828; Kinosternum odoratum — Bonaparte, 1830; Emys (Kinosternon) odoratum — Gray, 1831; Kinosternon odoratum — Gray, 1831; Didicla odorata — Rafinesque, 1832; Staurotypus odoratus — A.M.C. Duméril & Bibron, 1835; Clemmys (Sternothaerus) odorata — Fitzinger, 1835; Cistudo odorata — LeConte, 1854; Kinosternum guttatum LeConte, 1854; Sternotherus odoratus — LeConte, 1854; Aromochelys odorata — Gray, 1856; Aromochelys odoratum — Gray, 1856; Cinosternum odoratum — Agassiz, 1857; Emys glutinosa Agassiz, 1857; Ozotheca odorata — Agassiz, 1857; Ozotheca tristycha Agassiz, 1857; Cinosternum guttatum — Agassiz, 1857; Testudo glutinosa — Agassiz, 1857; Aromochelys guttata — Strauch, 1862; Aromochelys tristycha — Strauch, 1862; Ozothea odorata — Velasco, 1892; Sternothoerus odoratus — A.E. Brown, 1908; Sternotherus oderatus [sic] Dadd, 1974 (ex errore); Clemmys (Sternothaerus) odoratus — H.M. Smith & R.B. Smith, 1980; Kinosternon (Sternothaerus) odoratus — H.M. Smith & R.B. Smith, 1980; Armochelys odoratum — Zug, 1986; Sternotherus odouratus [sic] Herrel, 2002 (ex errore)

= Sternotherus odoratus =

Species of turtle

Sternotherus odoratus is a species of small turtle in the family Kinosternidae. The species is native to southeastern Canada and much of the Eastern United States. It is also known commonly as the common musk turtle, eastern musk turtle, or stinkpot turtle due to its ability to release a foul musky odor from scent glands on the edge of its shell, possibly to deter predation. This turtle is grouped in the same family as mud turtles.

== Etymology ==
The generic name Sternotherus is derived from the Greek word sternon, meaning chest or breast, and theros, meaning animal, in reference to the hinge on the turtles' plastron. The trivial name, or specific epithet odoratus is Latin, meaning to have an odor, referencing the scent of the musk from the scent glands that the turtles can produce when under stress or attack.

== Taxonomy ==
The species now known as Sternotherus odoratus was first described by the French taxonomist Pierre André Latreille in 1801, from a specimen collected near Charleston, South Carolina. At the time, almost all turtles were classified in the genus Testudo, and he gave it the name Testudo odorata. In 1825, John Edward Gray created the genus Sternotherus to include species of musk turtles, and it became Sternotherus odoratus. The species has been redescribed numerous times by many authors, leading to a large number of synonyms and some confusion in its classification.

As recently as the 1990s the genus Sternotherus was placed in the synonymy of the closely related genus Kinosternon, however that arrangement was not widely accepted and Sternotherus is generally regarded as a valid genus. The two genera Sternotherus (musk turtles) and Kinosternon (mud turtles), constitute the subfamily Kinosterninae within the family Kinosternidae.

== Description ==
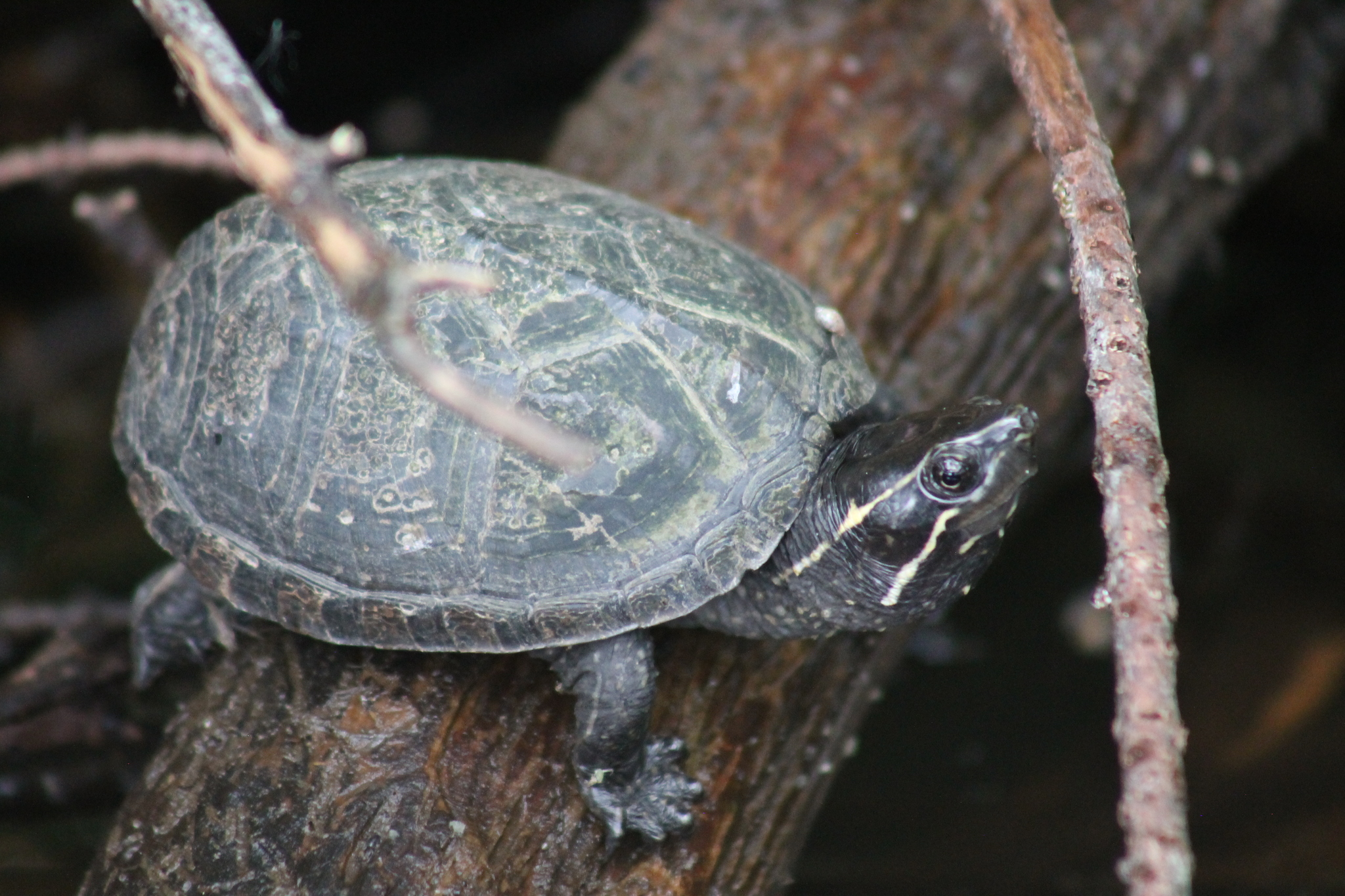
In Tennessee

The stinkpot is a small black, grey or brown turtle with a highly domed shell. It grows to a straight carapace length of approximately 5.1–14 cm (2.0–5.5 in).

It has a long neck and rather short legs. The yellow lines on the neck are a good field marker, and often can be seen from above in swimming turtles. The head is vaguely triangular in shape, with a pointed snout and sharp beak, and yellow-green striping from the tip of the nose to the neck. Barbels are present on the chin and the throat. The plastron is relatively small, offering little protection for the legs, and has only one transverse, anterior hinge. Algae often grow on their carapaces. Their tiny tongues are covered in bud-like papillae that allow them to respire underwater. This species is less buoyant than free swimming species and regulates buoyancy by varying its lung volume. They lack the cloacal bursae, internal pouch like structures, that some similar species have that assist with regulating buoyancy by storing water.

=== Megacephaly ===
In several populations, eastern musk turtles exhibit megacephaly. Megacephalic turtles have much larger and broader heads, and hypertrophied jaws muscles. The condition is known to occur in 9 families of turtles, and is associated with a durophagous diet. Normal and megacephalic individuals often coexist within the same population. It appears that megacephaly may not be genetically linked, instead developing in individuals as a response to a heavily durophagous diet.

=== Sexual dimorphism ===
Males can usually be distinguished from females by their significantly longer tails and by the spike that protrudes at the end of the tail. The anal vent on the underside of the tail extends out beyond the plastron on males. Females are also typically larger than males.

== Geographic distribution ==
The eastern musk turtle ranges in southern Ontario, southern Quebec, and in the Eastern United States from southern Maine in the north, south through to Florida, and west to central Texas, with a disjunct population located in central Wisconsin.

== Ecology and natural history ==
=== Behavior ===
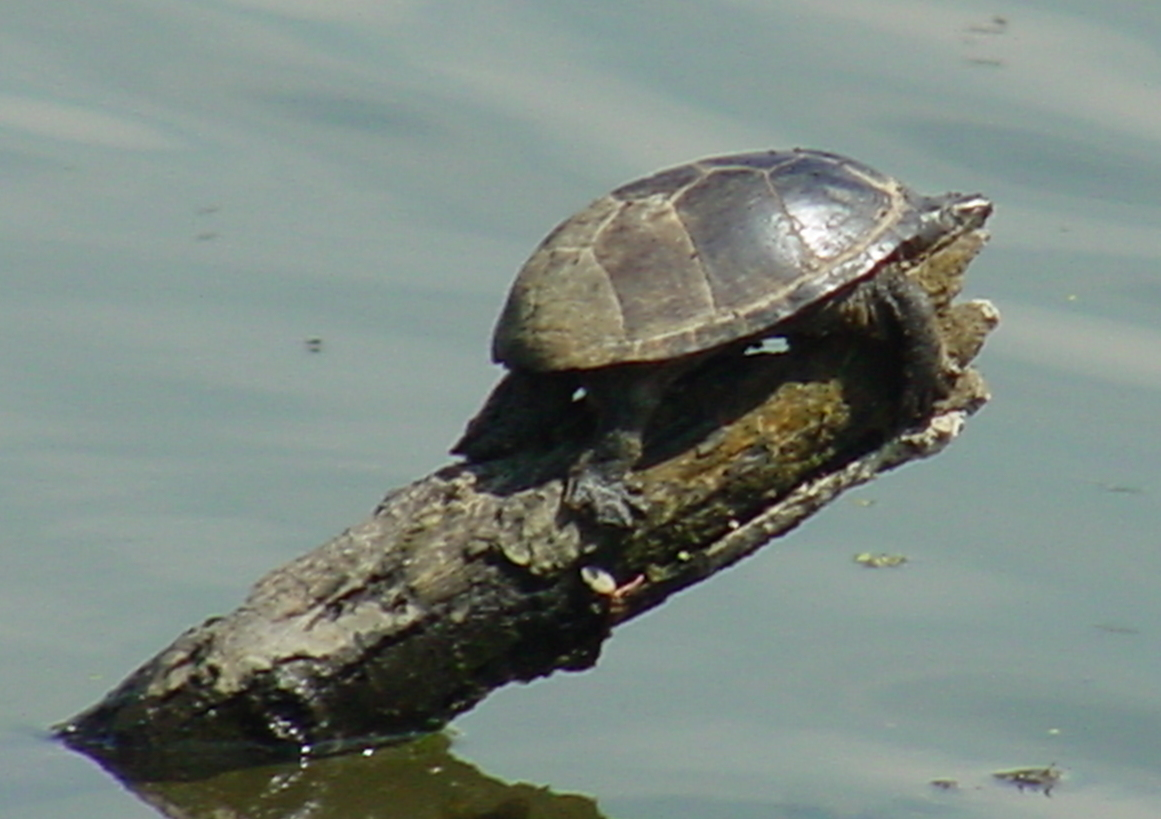
Sternotherus odoratus basking, Morris County, New Jersey.

The eastern musk turtle is mostly aquatic, spending the vast majority of its time in shallow, heavily vegetated waters of slow moving creeks, or in ponds. It typically only ventures onto land when the female lays eggs, to bask, or in some cases forage. It can climb sloping, partially submerged tree trunks or branches to as high as 2 m (6.6 ft) above the water surface, and has been known to drop into boats or canoes passing underneath. It is a poor swimmer and can most often be found walking along the bottom of its native habitats, which include swamps, marshes, ephemeral pools, and large rivers and lakes. The eastern musk turtle oftentimes uses chemical cues for intraspecies communication.

Its defense mechanism is to excrete a musk scent from a small gland in its underside, hence the name musk turtle. This is used to scare away predators and natural enemies. If harassed, a wild stinkpot often will not hesitate to bite. Because its neck can extend as far as its hind feet, caution is required when handling one.

=== Habitat ===
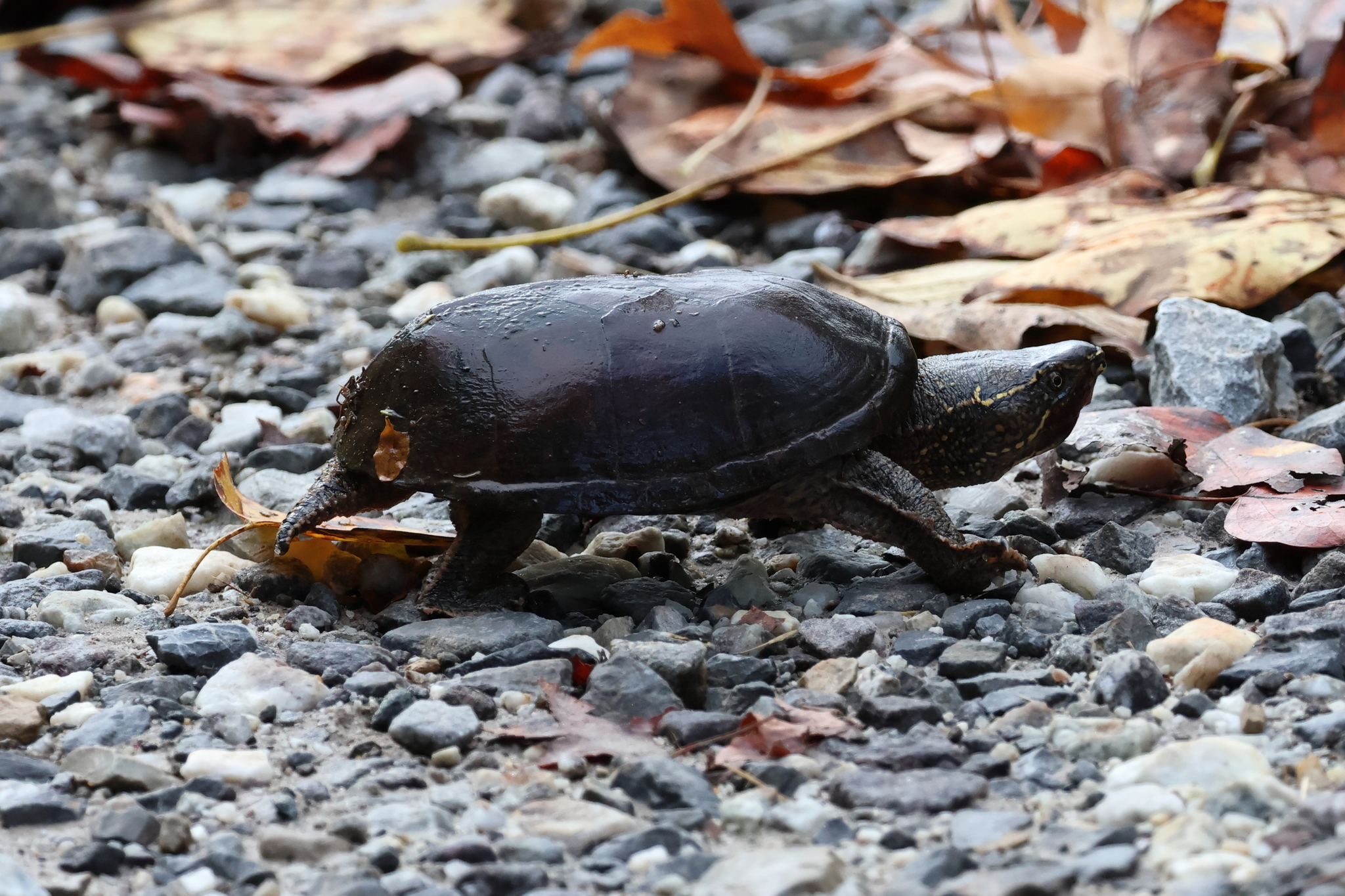
In Virginia

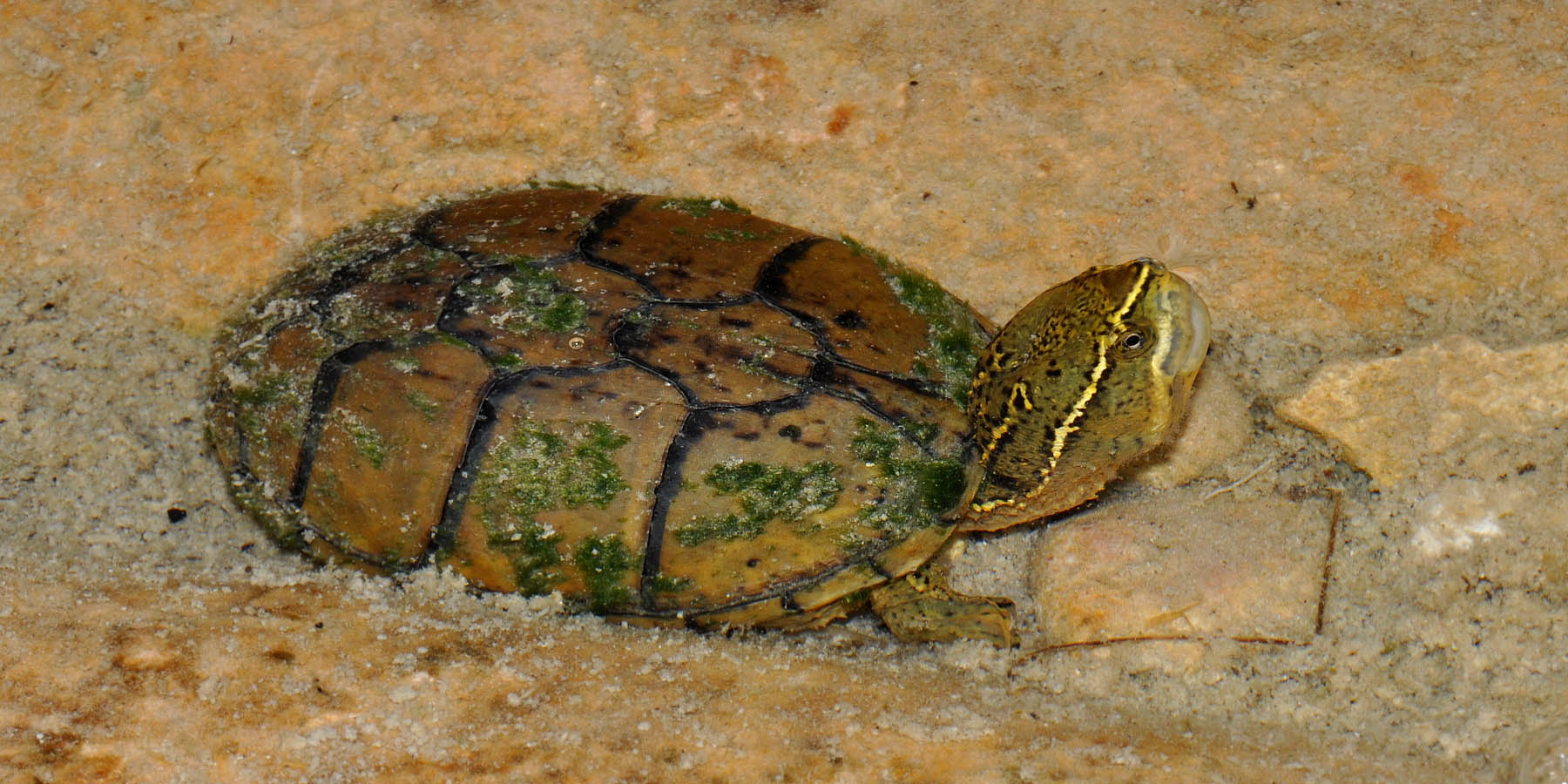
Eastern musk turtle in situ, Kerr County, Texas.

S. odoratus is found in a variety of wetland habitats and littoral zones, particularly shallow watercourses with a slow current and muddy bottom. Although it is more aquatic than some turtles, it is also capable of climbing, and may be seen basking on fallen trees and woody debris. Fallen trees and coarse woody debris are known to be important components of wetland habitat, and may be particularly beneficial to basking turtles. Like all turtles, the stinkpot must nest on land, and shoreline real estate development is detrimental. S. odoratus is also commonly found on roads during the nesting season, having fallen victim to road mortality, particularly after heavy rainfall. It hibernates buried in the mud under logs, or in muskrat lodges. Common musk turtles are able to live in a large range of environments due to their ability to rapidly adjust their immune activity to match outside temperatures. However, individuals actively choose warmer microhabitats to optimize physiological performance.

=== Diet ===
Sternotherus odoratus are omnivorous. The most common prey in the diet are mollusks (gastropods and bivalves), insects (including larva, adults, aquatic and terrestrial), and crustaceans (amphipods, isopods, and crayfish). Other items documented in the diet include earthworms, leeches, spiders, millipedes, small fish and fish eggs, amphibians (tadpoles and small frogs), small turtles, carrion, filamentous green algae, parts of vascular plants (e.g. Cornus, Eichhornia, Elodea, Hydrilla, Najas, Nuphar, Utricularia, Vallisneria), and a variety of seeds. Juveniles and sub-adults (under 5 cm.) feed on a higher percentage of aquatic insects, algae, and carrion with an ontogenetic shift to a broader diet in adults.

Sternotherus odoratus are predominantly aquatic, bottom feeders, but they are known to feed at the surface, and forage on land on occasion. Eastern musk turtles typically walk on the bottom of waterways with their necks extended searching for food, probing their heads into sand, mud, and decaying vegetation. An Oklahoma study found them to be euryphagous with seasonal changes in the diet, and food preferences directly related to availability, taking more animal food in the summer and plant material in the winter. Vegetation is a smaller, but consistent portion of the diet. Stomach and colon contents from 68 specimens were analyzed revealing 97.4% of the individuals had aquatic vegetation, comprising 20.4% of the volume. Missouri populations of S. odoratus were studied and found monthly, seasonal, and sexual differences in dietary preferences, in part due to sexual differences in peak activity and reproductive conditions. The study refuted the idea that S. odoratus are simply dietary generalists and that fluctuations in food availability, density, seasonal variation, and reproductive conditions influence their diet. Another study in Florida found the absence, or presence and competition, between other musk turtle species can influence the diet. A study from Texas found that certain populations of this species were consuming higher rates of invasive snails due to their abundance in some ecosystems.

A Michigan study suggested that the scavenging habits may be overestimated in the species and that musk turtles feed readily on freshly dead material but refuse animal flesh in advanced stages of decay. All fish remains from the digestive tracts were carrion, predominantly fish injured by anglers and dead or dying bait "minnows" dumped by fishermen.

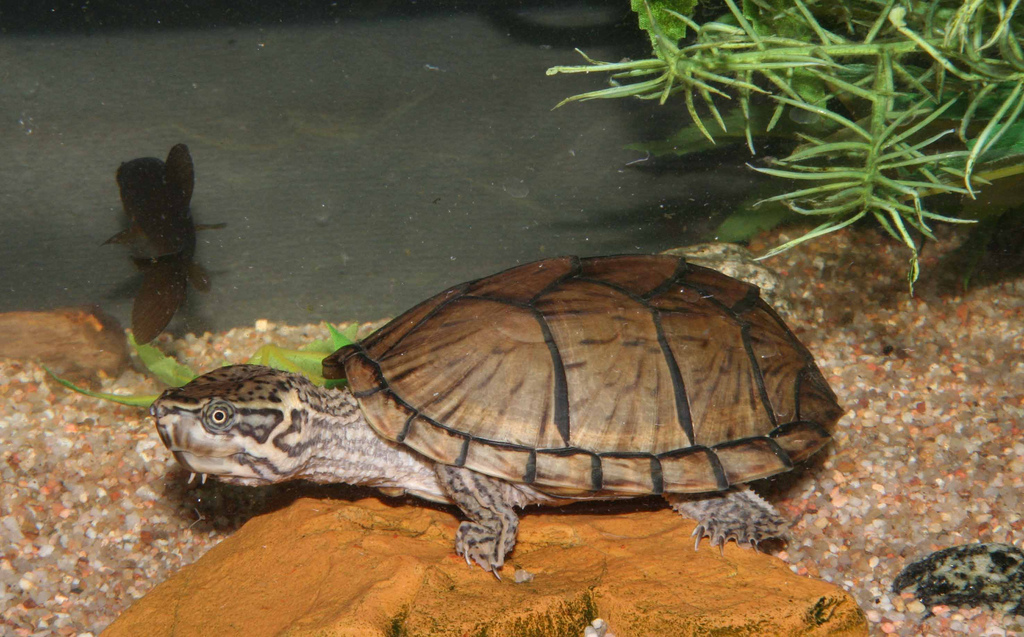
A hybrid between eastern and razor-backed musk turtles.

Adults and juveniles of stinkpots are eaten by raccoons, striped skunks, gray foxes, North American river otters, bald eagles, red-shouldered hawks, boat-tailed grackles, herons, egrets, common snapping turtles, northern water snakes and cottonmouths. American bullfrogs and largemouth bass also prey on stinkpots.

Eggs and hatchlings of stinkpots are eaten by raccoons, gray foxes, striped skunks, Virginia opossums, eastern kingsnakes, scarlet snakes and crows.

=== Lifecycle ===
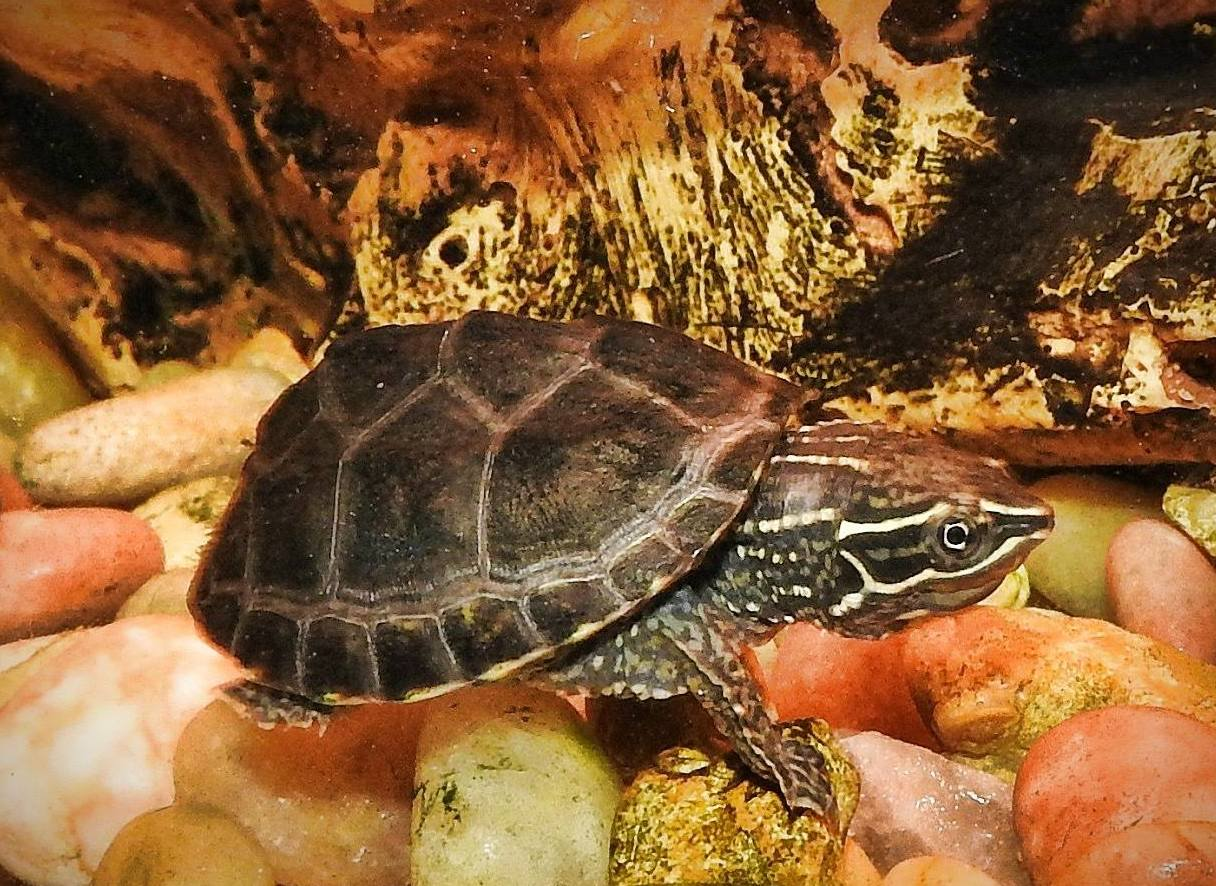
Juvenile

Female eastern musk turtles take 5 years to reach maturity.

Breeding of the eastern musk turtle occurs in the spring, and females often lay between 2 and 9 elliptical, hard-shelled eggs in a shallow burrow or under shoreline debris. However, testosterone and hormone levels peak in fall during spermiation. An unusual behavior is the tendency to share nesting sites; in one case there were 16 nests under a single log. The eggs hatch in late summer or early fall after an incubation period of 100 to 150 days, making this turtle a species that displays delayed emergence. Although in many turtles egg size increases with female size, that may not be the cause for musk turtles. Egg width increases, and elongation (length/width) decreases as female size and clutch size increases. One study found females that differed considerably in size still produced eggs of the same mean shape and size. However, the females were of similar age suggesting egg size and shape may be age specific. In this same study they found that the female's pelvic aperture gap was always wider than the width of the largest egg and there is no found optimal egg size that prevails better than others.

Egg predation is a major cause of mortality, as with many turtle species. In one Pennsylvania population, hatching success was only 15 percent, and predators alone destroyed 25 of 32 nests. Hatchlings are usually less than one inch long and have a very ridged shell which will become less pronounced as they age and will eventually be completely smooth and domed. Its lifespan, as with most turtles, is quite long, with specimens in captivity being recorded at 50+ years of age.

== Conservation status ==
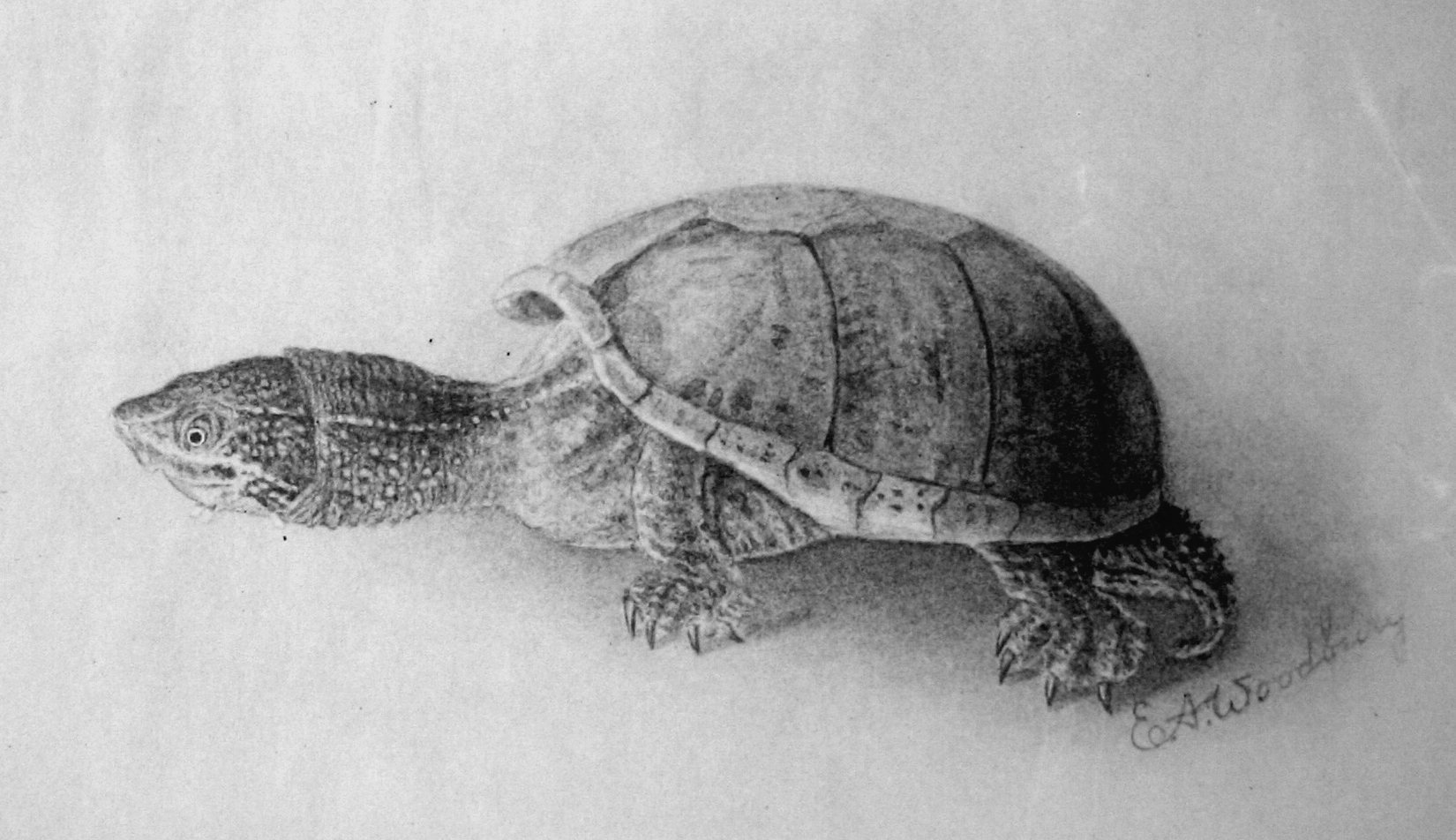
Illustration by E.A. Woodbury.

Though the eastern musk turtle holds no federal conservation status in the US and is quite common throughout most of its range, it has declined notably in some areas, and appears to be more sensitive than some native species to human degradation of wetlands. It is listed as a threatened species in the state of Iowa. It is listed as a species at risk in Canada, and is protected by the federal Species at Risk Act (SARA). It is also protected under Ontario's endangered species act. In this part of its range, only wetlands with minimal human impact have robust populations. Road mortality of breeding females may be one of the problems associated with human development.

== Gallery ==
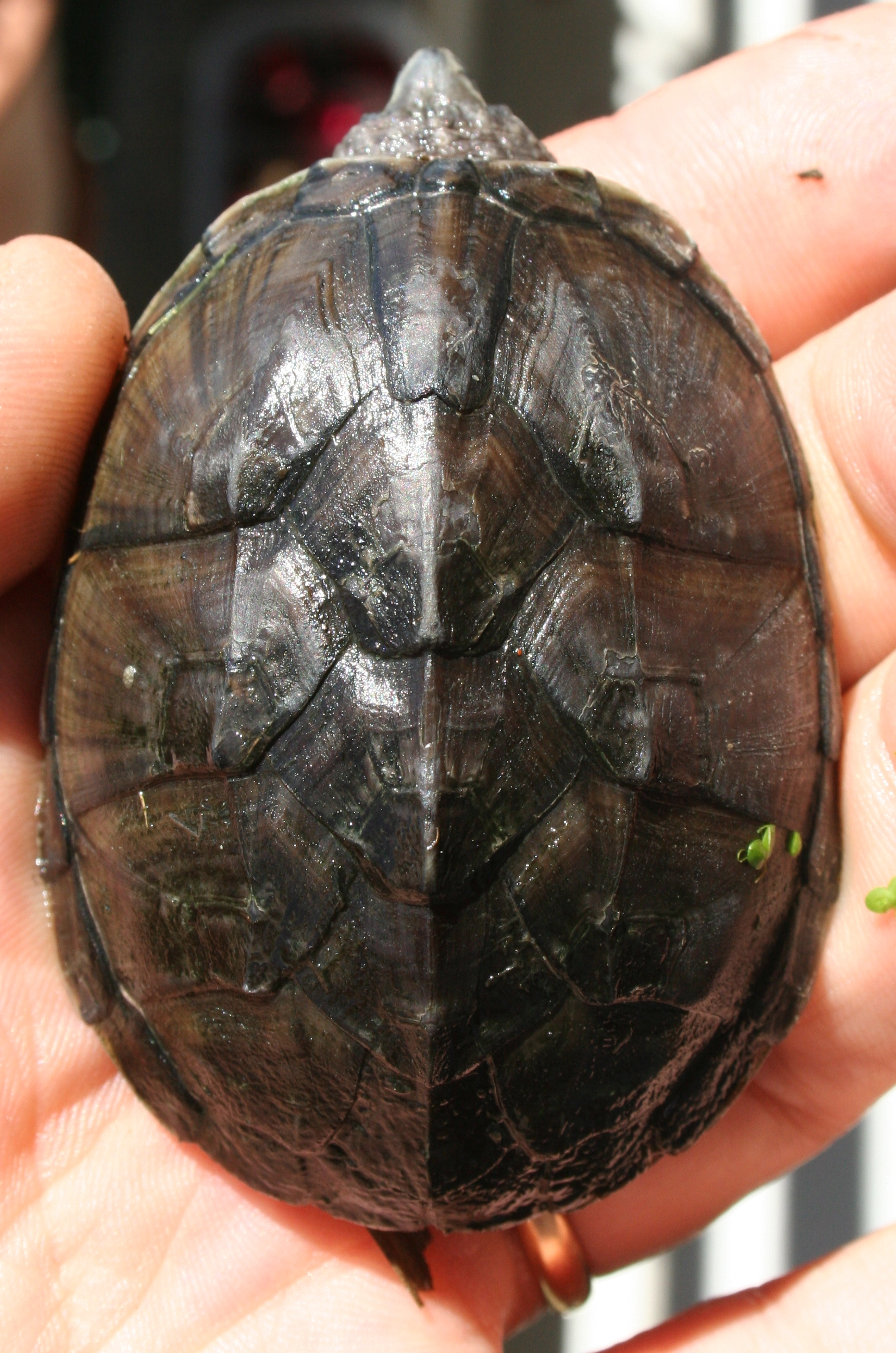
Carapace

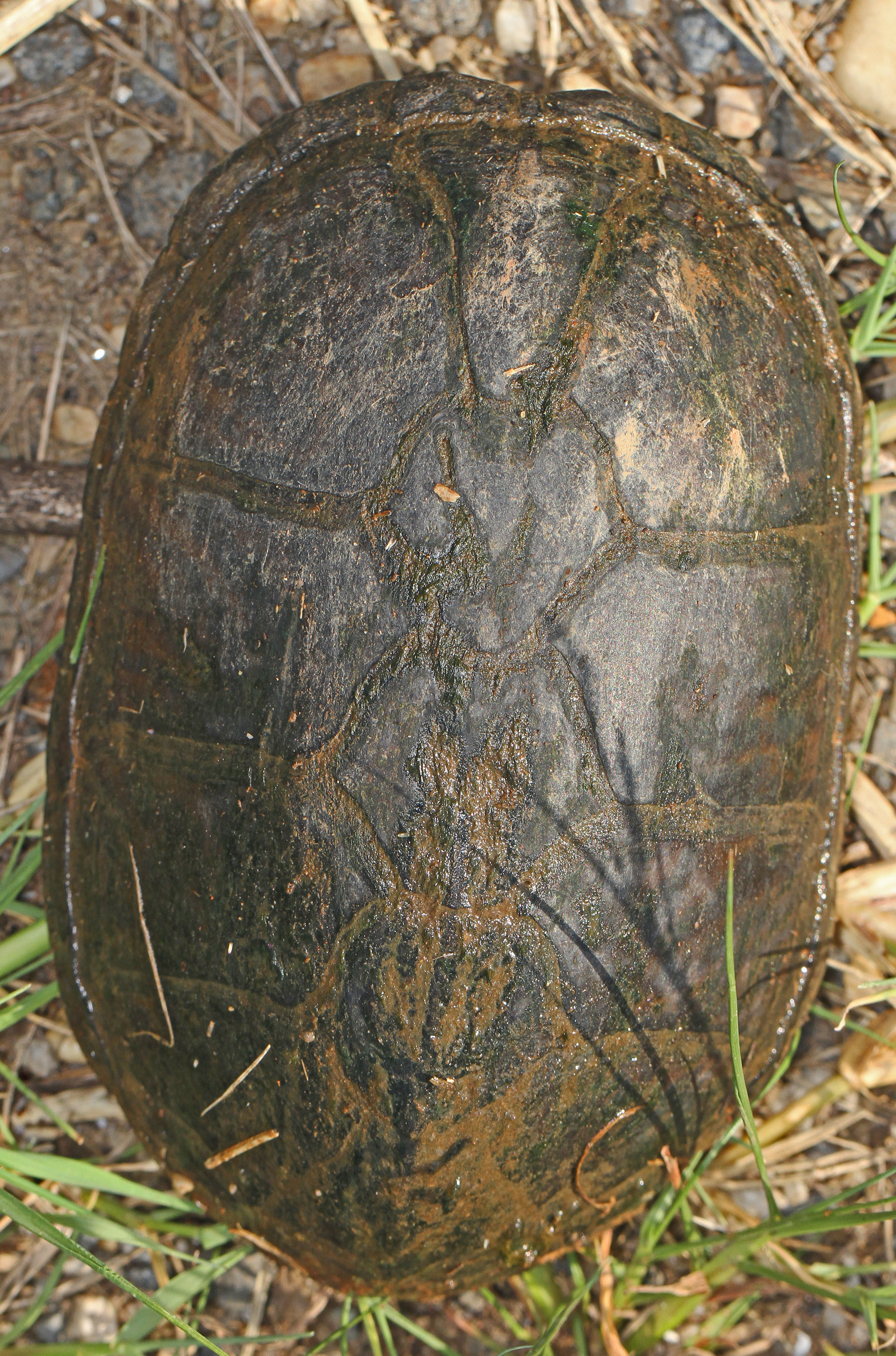
Carapace, Maryland

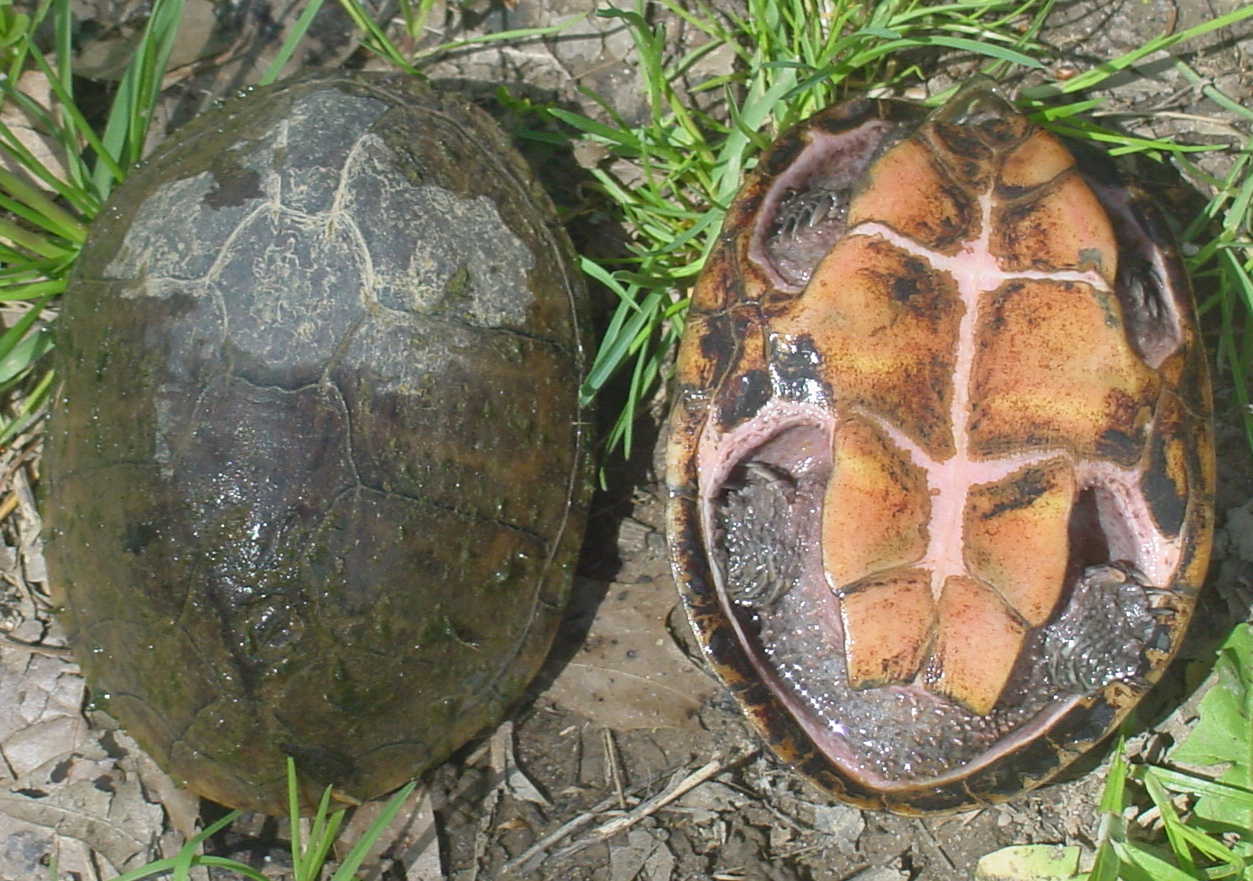
Carapace and plastron, New Jersey

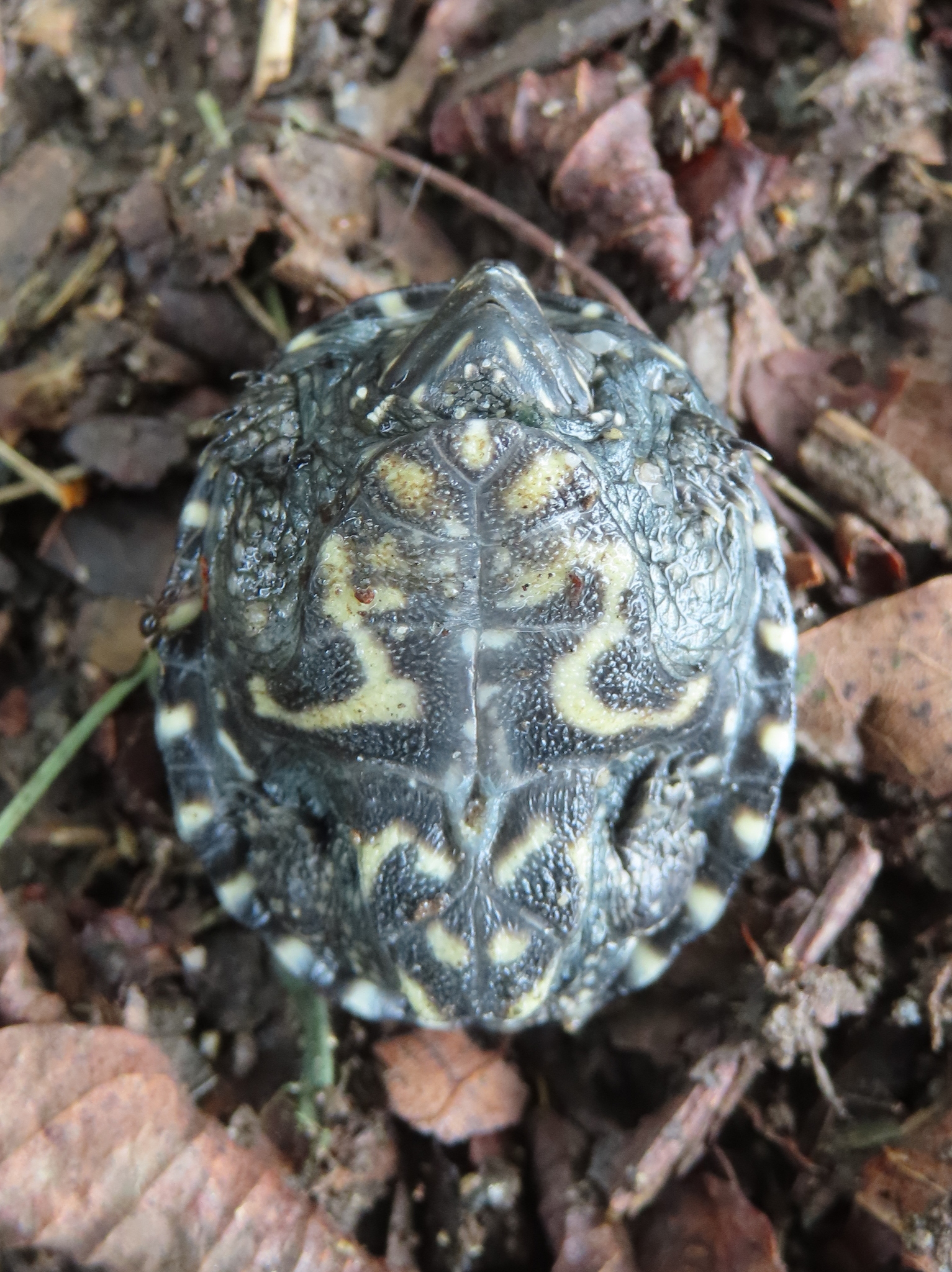
Juvenile plastron, Maryland

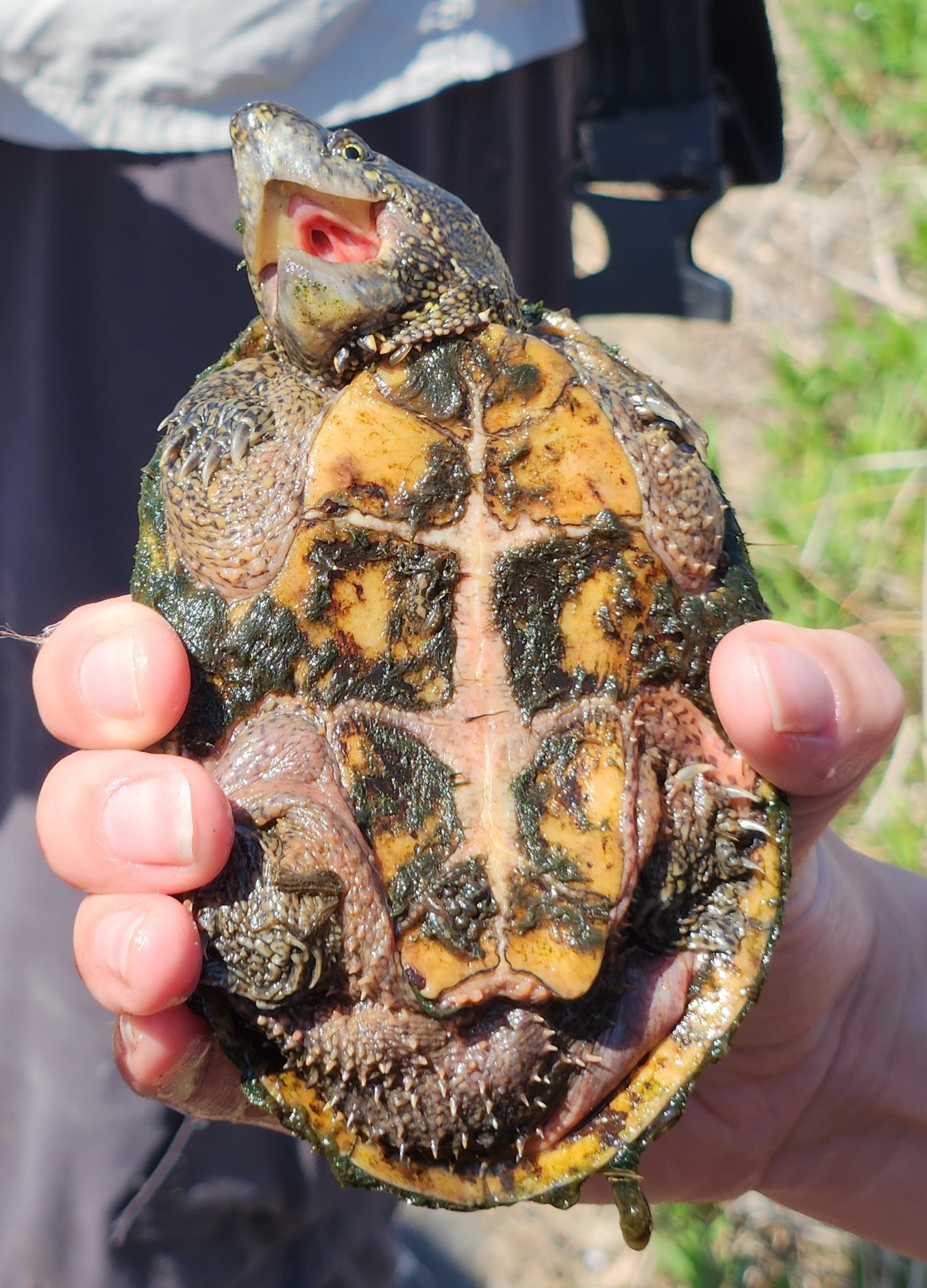
Plastron, Ontario

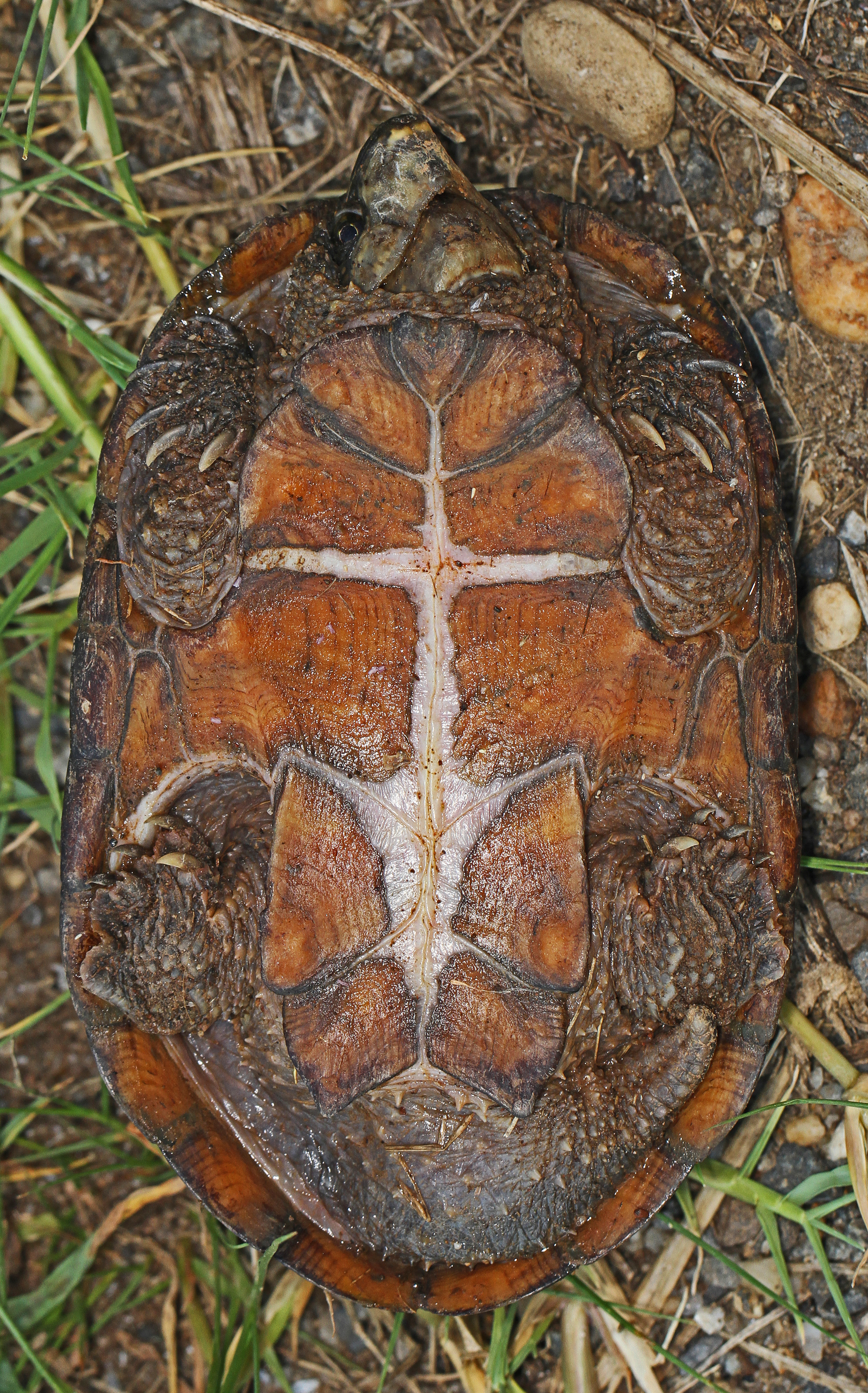
Plastron, Maryland

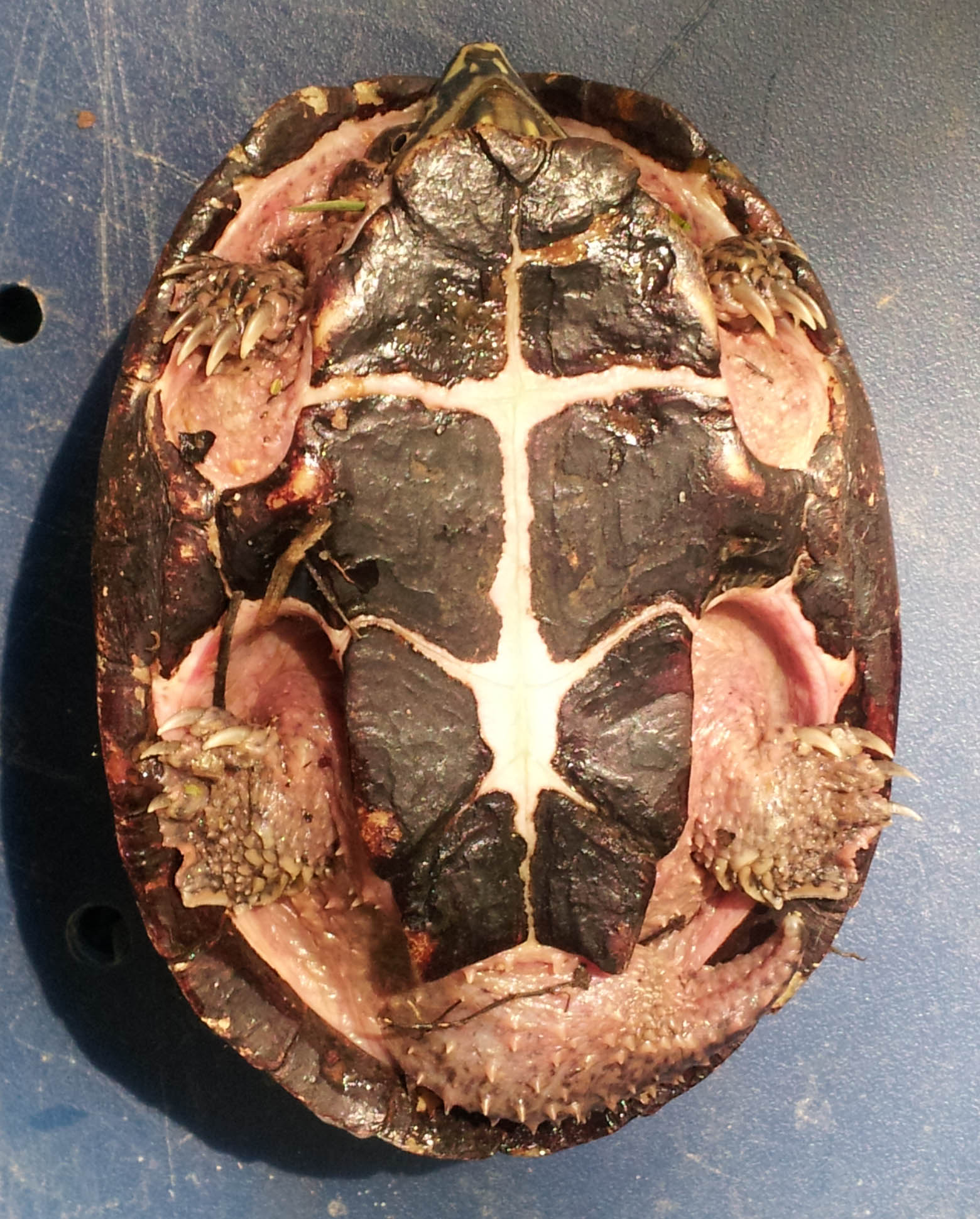
Plastron, Maryland

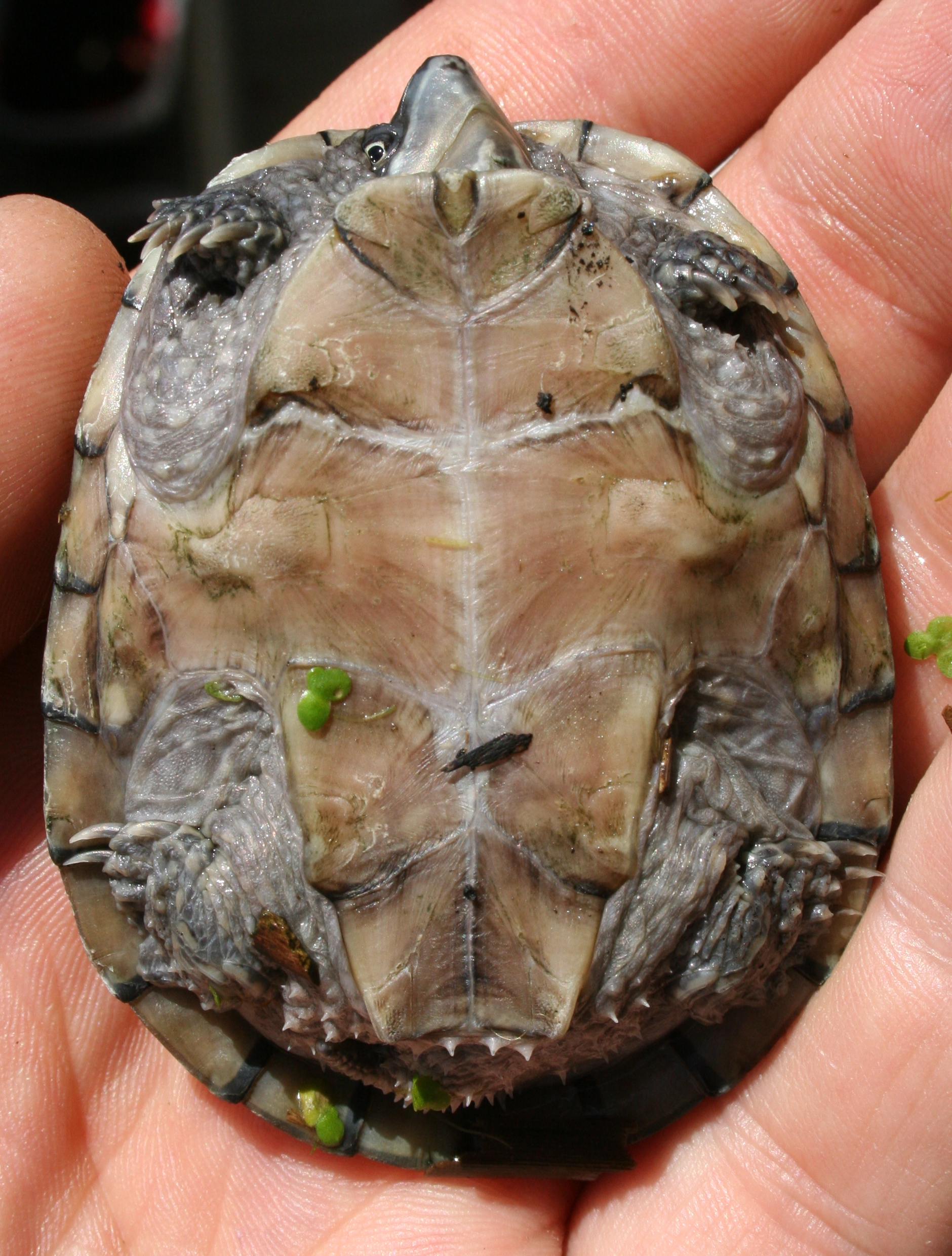
Plastron

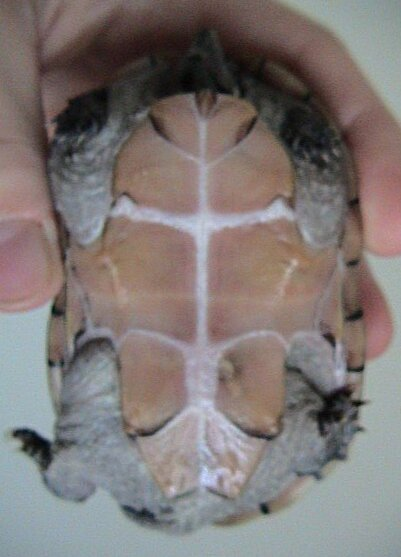
Plastron
