= Tantillita lintoni =

Conservation status
- Least Concern (IUCN 3.1)

Scientific classification
- Kingdom: Animalia
- Phylum: Chordata
- Class: Reptilia
- Order: Squamata
- Suborder: Serpentes
- Family: Colubridae
- Genus: Tantillita
- Species: T. lintoni

Binomial name
- Tantillita lintoni (H.M. Smith, 1940)

Synonyms
- Tantilla lintoni H.M. Smith, 1940

Species of snake

Tantillita lintoni, also known commonly as the brown dwarf short-tailed snake, Linton's dwarf short-tail snake, and la culebrita enana de Linton in Spanish, is a species of snake in the subfamily Colubrinae of the family Colubridae. The species is native to southeastern Mexico and Central America. There are two recognized subspecies

== Etymology ==
The specific name, lintoni, is in honor of American archaeologist Linton Satterthwaite Jr.

The subspecific name, rozellae, is in honor of American herpetologist Rozella Blood Smith who was the wife of American herpetologist Hobart M. Smith.

== Geographic range ==
T. lintoni is found in Mexico, Belize, Guatemala, Honduras, and Nicaragua.

== Habitat ==
The preferred natural habitat of T. lintoni is forest, at altitudes from sea level to 550 m (1,800 ft), but it has also been found in banana groves and pastures.

== Behavior ==
T. lintoni is terrestrial.

== Reproduction ==
T. lintoni is oviparous.

== Subspecies ==
Two subspecies are recognized as being valid, including the nominotypical subspecies.

- Tantillita linton lintoni (H.M. Smith, 1940)
- Tantillita lintoni rozellae Pérez-Higareda, 1985
