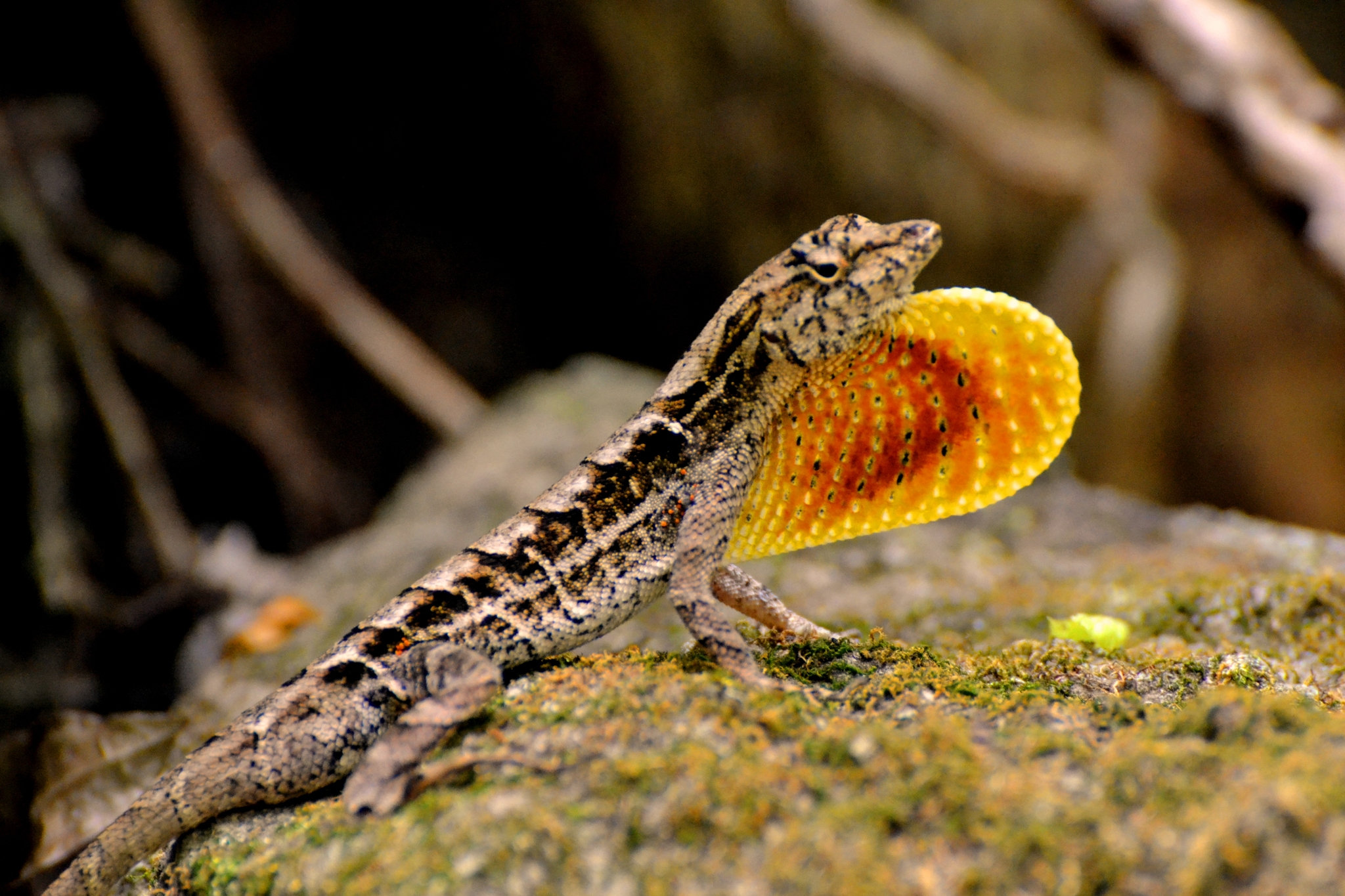

Scientific classification
- Kingdom: Animalia
- Phylum: Chordata
- Class: Reptilia
- Order: Squamata
- Suborder: Iguania
- Family: Dactyloidae
- Genus: Anolis
- Species: A. spilorhipis

Binomial name
- Anolis spilorhipis Álvarez Del Toro & Smith, 1956)

= Anolis spilorhipis =

Species of lizard

Anolis spilorhipis is a species of lizard in the family Dactyloidae. The species is found in Mexico.
