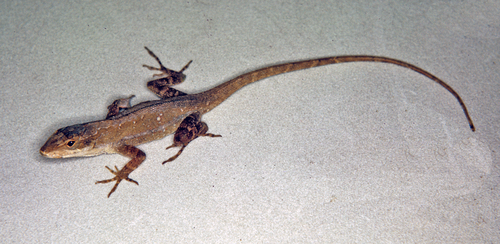

Conservation status
- Least Concern (IUCN 3.1)

Scientific classification
- Kingdom: Animalia
- Phylum: Chordata
- Class: Reptilia
- Order: Squamata
- Suborder: Iguania
- Family: Dactyloidae
- Genus: Anolis
- Species: A. megapholidotus

Binomial name
- Anolis megapholidotus Smith, 1933

= Anolis megapholidotus =

Species of lizard

Anolis megapholidotus, the large-scaled anole, is a species of lizard in the family Dactyloidae. The species is found in Mexico.
