= Mary Butler Lewis =

American anthropologist

Mary Butler Lewis (1903–1970) was an American archaeologist, anthropologist, and public educator best known for her contributions to the fields of Mesoamerican archaeology and Northeastern and Central U.S. prehistory. She was the first female archaeologist to earn a doctorate degree from the department of anthropology at the University of Pennsylvania, as well as one of the first female archaeologists to earn a Ph.D. in the United States. She worked with the University of Pennsylvania Museum as the assistant of the American section and as a research assistant, where she conducted her own fieldwork in Piedras Negras in Guatemala. She pioneered research on Mesoamerican pottery and ceramics, which paved the way for many new projects. President of the Philadelphia Anthropological Society, Butler conducted historical research in Pennsylvania and New York.

== Early life and education ==
Butler was born in 1903 in Media, Pennsylvania. She was the daughter of Eleanor Baird Reed and George Thomas Butler, a leading attorney of the Delaware County Bar Association."

Butler attended Vassar College for her undergraduate studies, graduating in 1925, then went on to the Sorbonne for a year of postgraduate studies. She taught French in the United States for a few years, and later began her studies in anthropology with a master's degree at Radcliffe College of Harvard University, where she graduated in 1930.

In 1936, she earned her Ph.D. from the University of Pennsylvania. She was the first female archaeologist to earn an anthropology degree at the University of Pennsylvania. At the time, she was one of the first female archaeologists to earn a doctorate degree in the United States. Her dissertation, "Ethnological and Historical Importance of Piedras Negras Pottery," pioneered research in Mesoamerican pottery for future scholars.

Butler was also a member of the Society for American Archaeology as well as Sigma Xi.

== Influence in the Field of Mesoamerican Archaeology ==
Butler's influence in the field of Mesoamerican Archaeology began with her employment at the University of Pennsylvania Museum, where she was Assistant of the American Section from 1930 to 1939. At the start of her career, she travelled to Guatemala on two separate occasions for expeditions sponsored by the University of Pennsylvania Museum. During these expeditions, she worked under J. Alden Mason and Linton Sattherthwaite.

Butler used the research from these expeditions for her dissertation. She also published the Piedras Negras "Preliminary Papers," and her study of ceramics became "pivotal" to Linton Satterthwaite's reconstruction of the Piedras Negras site.

After receiving her doctoral degree from the University of Pennsylvania, Butler became a research associate at the University of Pennsylvania Museum. From 1939 to 1941, she was funded by the American Philosophical Association to do fieldwork in Guatemala. With this funding, she visited Guatemala twice more, first at the site of Alta Verapaz and then Quiche. She excavated sites near San Pedro Carcha, Chama, and Nabaj, and her work was continued by Robert Burkitt.

== Influence in the Field of Northeastern and Central United States Prehistory ==
When Butler entered the field of Northeastern and Central United States archaeology and prehistory, it was male-dominated. Because Butler had credentials and training from outside the United States, she was a more attractive candidate for field work. As a result, Butler was able to gain field work employment even when women were generally barred from such employment.

=== Ceramic Technology Project ===
She began her work in 1935 leading a Ceramic Technology Project that was co-sponsored by the University of Pennsylvania Museum and Works Progress Administration. This project consisted of analyzing artifacts with chemicals and other petrographic methods. Specifically, her findings included an analysis of pigments, clays, and other factors in technology that had changed over time.

=== Survey of Hudson Valley ===
In 1936, she directed work for the Pennsylvania Historical Commission in 1936 in Somerset County. Afterwards, she conducted a large archaeological survey of the Hudson Valley for Vassar College, including 45 sites, sponsored by a grant from the Carnegie Corporation. She hired many women to work with her in the field; her first field crew was almost one-third women. After two field seasons, the Carnegie Corporation discontinued its financial support due to the war effort, where the remaining funds were directed instead. In 1940, Butler used this data and presented a paper at the Eastern States Archaeological Federation.

Even with the Federation's backing, her contributions did not receive much recognition. At the time of publication, the New York State Archaeologist did not include her survey results in his publication of major works, which can be attributed to gender bias.

=== Local Pennsylvania Historical Sites ===
After marrying Clifford Lewis in 1942 and having two children, she shifted her professional focus to local historical sites in Pennsylvania. This change from a global to local focus is described as a "survival strategy" for many female archaeologists at the time. Female archaeologists struggled with sexism in the workforce and having to balance raising children with their careers, so the best option was to work close to home. When her children were young, Butler tried to avoid taking long trips that would require her to leave her family.

In 1943, however, Butler took an emergency call and conducted an excavation in Broomall, Pennsylvania. She "bundled up her eleven-week-old daughter in the car and went forth to the dig - carrying on efficiently as director, and giving the baby her bottle at the coffee break and lunch hour."

She later became a Historian-Archaeologist for the restoration of the Morton Morton House in Norwood, Pennsylvania. For this project, she conducted historical research and analyzed correspondences, financial records, and more from the location. An avid educator, she was an instructor at Hunter College, Bryn Mawr College, and Vassar College, employing her graduate students on the Morton Morton restoration project.

== Final Years and Death ==
For her entire career, Butler was a research associate at the University of Pennsylvania Museum of Archaeology and Anthropology. She was a fellow of the American Anthropological Association and became President of the Philadelphia Anthropological Society. Lewis continued her research until she died of cancer in 1970 at her home in Media, Pennsylvania.
