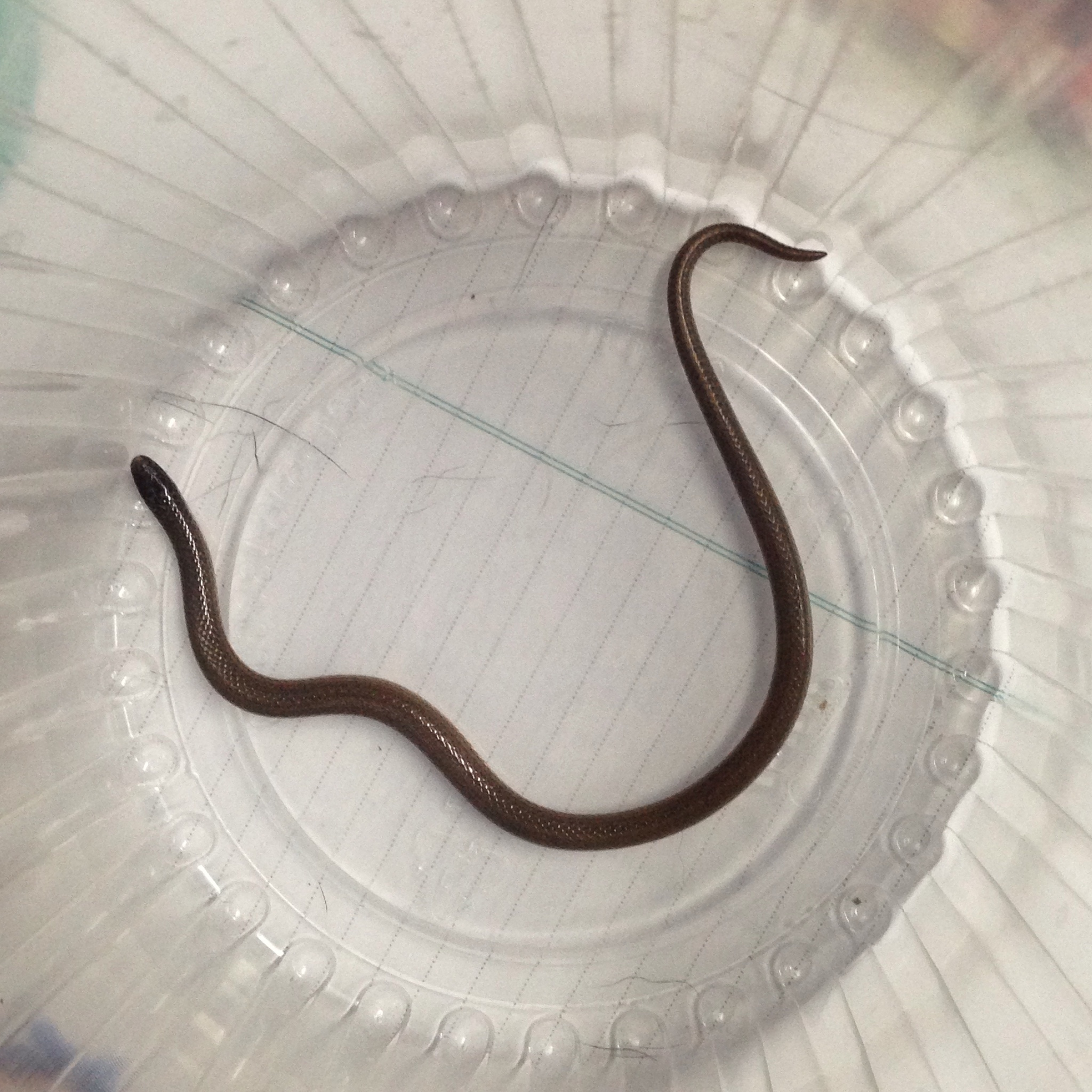
- Tantillita canula

Scientific classification
- Kingdom: Animalia
- Phylum: Chordata
- Class: Reptilia
- Order: Squamata
- Suborder: Serpentes
- Family: Colubridae
- Subfamily: Colubrinae
- Genus: Tantillita; H.M. Smith, 1941

= Tantillita =

Genus of snakes

Tantillita is a genus of snakes in the family Colubridae. The genus is endemic to Central America.

== Species and subspecies ==
Three species are recognized as being valid. One species has two subspecies, including the nominotypical subspecies.

- Tantillita brevissima (Taylor, 1937) - speckled dwarf short-tail snake
- Tantillita canula (Cope, 1876) - Yucatan dwarf short-tail snake
- Tantillita lintoni (H.M. Smith, 1940) - brown dwarf short-tailed snake, Linton's dwarf short-tail snake,
  - Tantillita lintoni lintoni (H.M. Smith, 1940)
  - Tantillita lintoni rozellae Pérez-Higareda, 1985

Nota bene: A binomial authority or a trinomial authority in parentheses indicates that the species or the subspecies, respectively, was originally described in a genus other than Tantillita.

== Etymology ==
The specific name, lintoni, is in honor of American archeologist Linton Satterthwaite.

The subspecific name, rozellae, is in honor of American herpetologist Rozella Blood Smith, wife of American herpetologist Hobart Muir Smith.

== Reproduction ==
All species in the genus Tantillita are oviparous.
