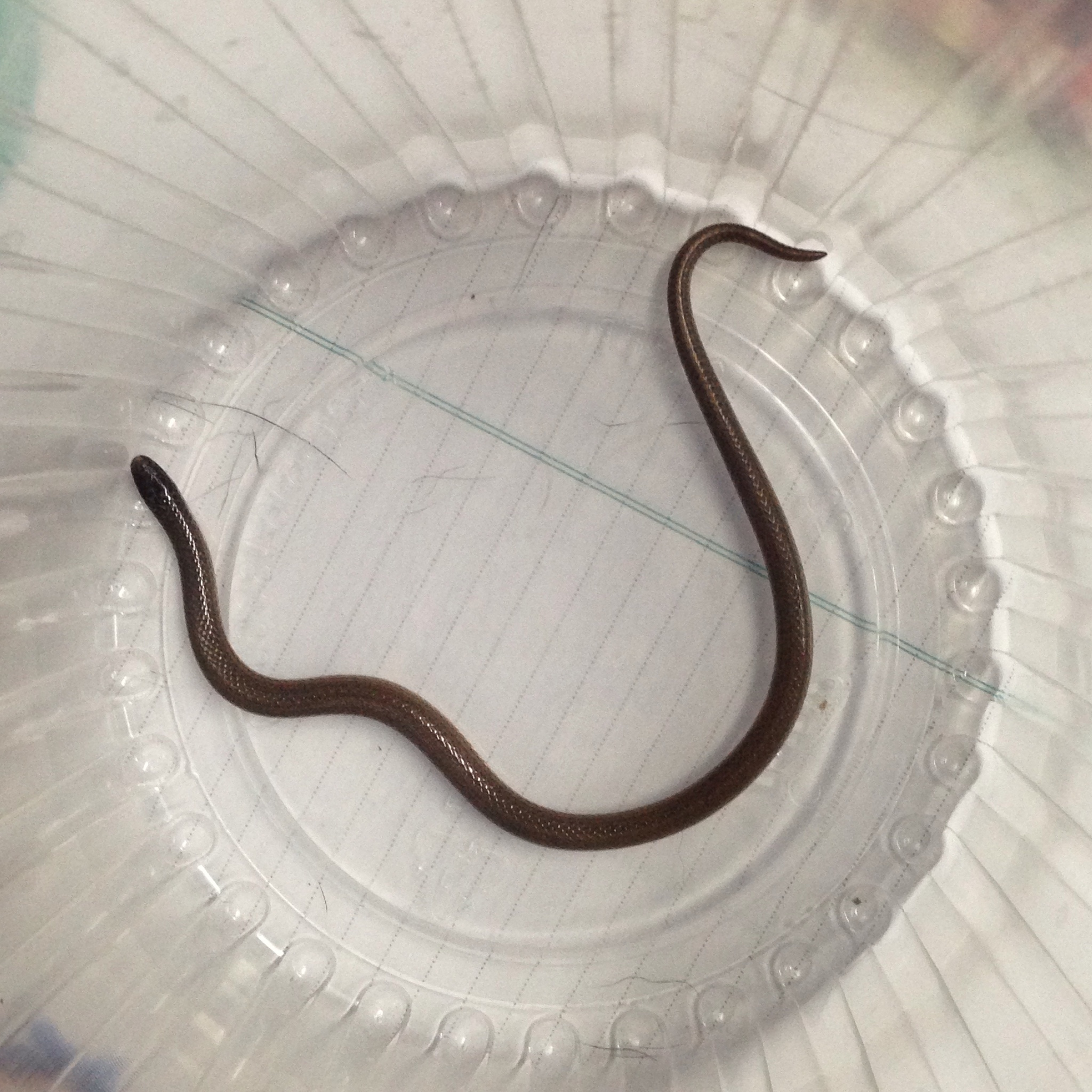

Conservation status
- Least Concern (IUCN 3.1)

Scientific classification
- Kingdom: Animalia
- Phylum: Chordata
- Class: Reptilia
- Order: Squamata
- Suborder: Serpentes
- Family: Colubridae
- Genus: Tantillita
- Species: T. canula

Binomial name
- Tantillita canula (Cope, 1875)

= Tantillita canula =

Species of snake

Tantillita canula, the Yucatán dwarf short-tail snake, is a species of snake of the family Colubridae.

The snake is found in Mexico, Guatemala, Belize, and El Salvador.
