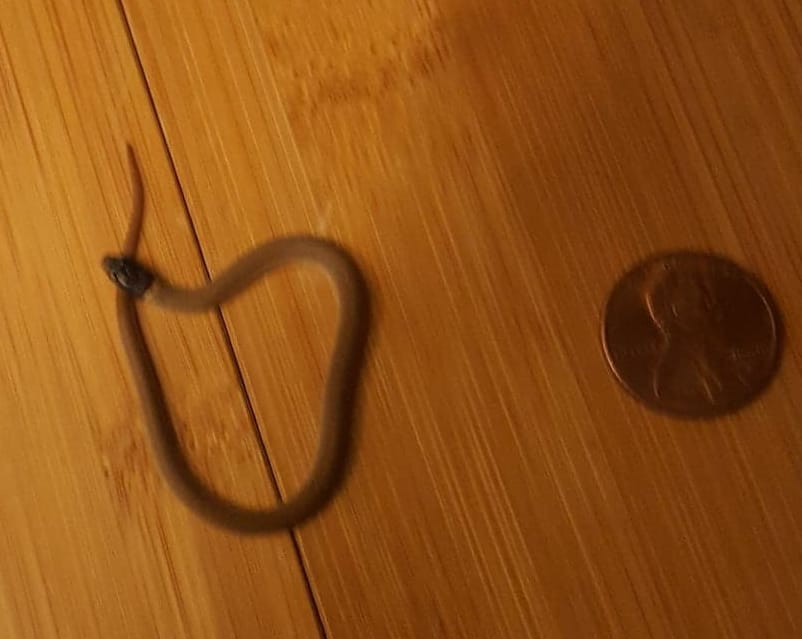

Conservation status
- Least Concern (IUCN 3.1)

Scientific classification
- Kingdom: Animalia
- Phylum: Chordata
- Class: Reptilia
- Order: Squamata
- Suborder: Serpentes
- Family: Colubridae
- Genus: Tantilla
- Species: T. hobartsmithi

Binomial name
- Tantilla hobartsmithi Taylor, 1936
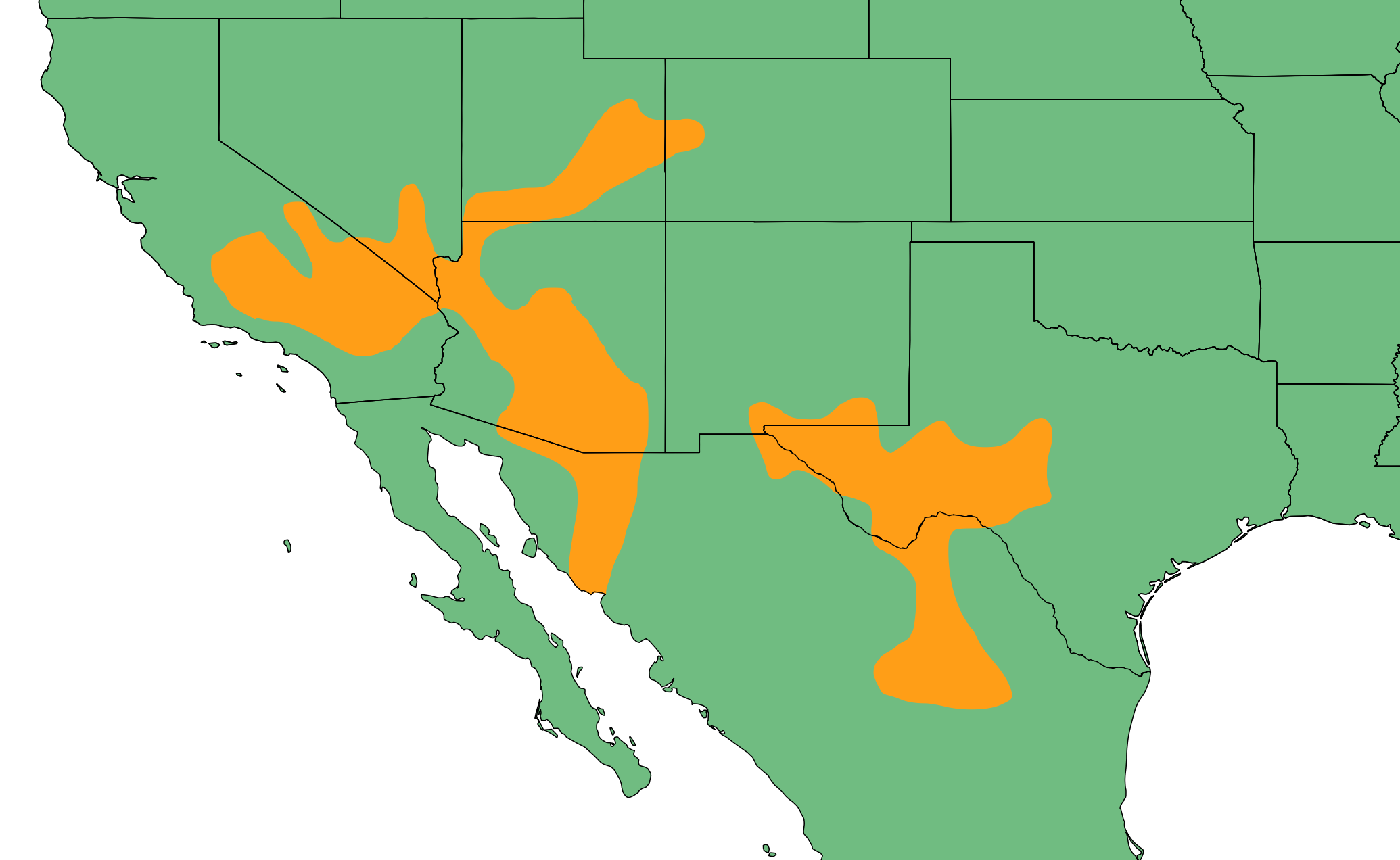

Synonyms
- Tantilla hobartsmithi Taylor, 1936; Tantilla utahensis Blanchard, 1938; Tantilla hobartsmithi — Stebbins, 1985

= Tantilla hobartsmithi =

Species of snake

Tantilla hobartsmithi, commonly known as Smith's black-headed snake and the southwestern blackhead snake, is a species of small snake in the subfamily Colubrinae of the family Colubridae. The species is native to the southwestern United States and adjacent northern Mexico.

== Etymology ==
The specific name or epithet, hobartsmithi, is in honor of American zoologist and herpetologist Hobart M. Smith (1912–2013).

== Taxonomy and systematics ==
Tantilla hobartsmithi was first described by Edward Harrison Taylor in 1936.

== Description ==
The southwestern blackhead snake is a small snake, growing to a maximum total length (tail included) of 15 in (38 cm), but typically averaging around 8 in (20 cm) in total length.

Dorsally, it is uniformly brown in color, except for the black-colored head, which gives it its common name, and a cream-colored or white collar. On the belly, there is a broad reddish stripe, which runs down the center of the ventral scales.

== Venom ==
Tantilla hobartsmithi is rear-fanged, having enlarged rear teeth and a modified saliva, which while harmless to mammals, is believed to be toxic to arthropods, its primary prey.

== Behavior ==
Blackhead snakes (genus Tantilla) are primarily nocturnal and fossorial, spending most of their time hiding in loose soil, leaf litter, or under ground debris.

== Diet ==
Blackhead snakes eat most varieties of soft-bodied insects, centipedes, millipedes, and spiders.

== Reproduction ==
Tantilla hobartsmithi is oviparous. Clutch size is only one to three eggs, which are laid in June, July, or August.

== Geographic range ==
The southwestern blackhead snake is found in the southwestern United States, in Arizona, California, Colorado, Nevada, New Mexico, Texas, and Utah, as well as in northern Mexico, in Chihuahua, Coahuila, and Sonora.

== Habitat ==
The preferred natural habitats of Tantilla hobartsmithi are desert, grassland, shrubland, and forest, at altitudes from sea level to 1,981 m (6,499 ft).
