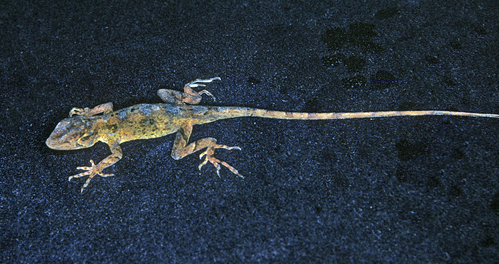

Conservation status
- Endangered (IUCN 3.1)

Scientific classification
- Kingdom: Animalia
- Phylum: Chordata
- Class: Reptilia
- Order: Squamata
- Suborder: Iguania
- Family: Anolidae
- Genus: Anolis
- Species: A. hobartsmithi

Binomial name
- Anolis hobartsmithi Nieto-Montes de Oca, 2001

= Anolis hobartsmithi =

Species of lizard

Anolis hobartsmithi, also known commonly as Hobart Smith's anole, the north Chiapas anole, and el abanquillo de Hobart Smith in Mexican Spanish, is a species of lizard in the family Dactyloidae. The species is native to Mexico.

== Etymology ==
The specific name, hobartsmithi, is in honor of American herpetologist Hobart Muir Smith.

== Geographic range ==
A. hobartsmithi is endemic to the Mexican state of Chiapas.

== Habitat ==
The preferred natural habitat of A. hobartsmithi is forest, but it has also been found in agricultural areas. The holotype was collected at an altitude of about 2,000 m (6,600 ft).

== Reproduction ==
A. hobartsmithi is oviparous.
