= Rozella B. Smith =

American herpetologist and data archivist and analyst

- Born: Rozella Pearl Beverly Blood; 18 May 1911; Wichita, Kansas
- Died: 15 December 1987 (aged 76); Boulder, Colorado
- Education: University of Illinois at Urbana–Champaign
- Occupation: Herpetologist
- Spouse: Hobart M. Smith

Rozella B. Smith (1911–1987) was an American herpetologist and data archivist and analyst.

== Biography ==
Rozella Pearl Beverly Blood was an only child, born 18 May 1911 in Wichita, Kansas, to Charles Gillman Blood and Sarah Dorothy "Dollie" Sherman. She died in Boulder, Colorado on 15 December 1987.

Rozella Blood enrolled in Wichita High School in 1929 and then became a student at the institution then-called the University of Wichita, earning a B.A. in 1932 and an M.S. in entomology in 1933. She went on to attend the University of Kansas Medical School as a graduate student and assistant instructor in anatomy, neurology and histology, also working as a staff artist, from 1933 to 1937. After earning a teaching certificate in Kansas, she taught science and mathematics for a year at Altoona High School starting in the fall of 1937.

=== Researcher and teacher ===
In 1938, she married fellow graduate student and herpetologist Hobart M. Smith in Chicago, Illinois, and changed her name to Rozella B. Smith. They would go on to have two children, Bruce and Sally. Following the wedding, the pair left on a two-year research trip to Mexico, where they gathered more than 20,000 amphibians and reptiles, which were all preserved, tagged and transported to the Smithsonian Institution in Washington, D.C. After the trip's conclusion, the Smiths moved to Washington for a year to oversee the integration of their specimens into the Smithsonian's collections.

At the University of Illinois, she attended classes as "an unattached graduate student" from 1953 to 1961. Later, in 1963, she earned a second a Master of Science degree, this time in library science. Then, she earned a second teaching certificate so she could lead classes in ancient history for a year at the University High School beginning in 1965.

After moving to Boulder, Colorado, in 1968, where she worked at the University of Colorado, she gave "guidance to undergraduates, graduates, and faculty members in her own and other departments, and to affiliates of the Center for Computer Research in the Humanities, in techniques of her special forte of fixed-field data processing and retrieval, and of correlation indexing." In August 1982, she was awarded an honorary Doctor of Science degree from the University of Colorado in recognition of her work with undergraduate and graduate students.

=== Data analysis ===
Smith was working as head cataloger in the library of the National Center for Atmospheric Research in Boulder, Colorado, in 1966, when she began customizing new cataloging software on computers that had just been made available.

She took on the job of digitizing the large quantity of data and graphics accumulated over nearly 30 years of collecting by herself and her co-author and husband. Throughout this time, supported from 1971 to 1985 with grants from the National Library of Medicine and several National Science Foundation divisions, she created the computational structures, input mechanisms, data analysis techniques and output documents. In so doing she provided essential information to her collaborator, H.M. Smith, who used her analytical results to evaluate his extensive research collection and publish more than 1,600 manuscripts, with many listing Rozella as coauthor.

=== Taxa ===
In her honor, several species-group taxa bear the name rozellae including a subspecies of snake, Tantillita lintoni rozellae, 1940, and a species of lizard, Celestus rozellae, 1942.

== Selected works ==
Rozella Smith was author or co-author of seven books and close to 70 articles, as well as many other projects that remained unfinished and unpublished, such as several data analysis works about Mexican herpetology.

- Smith, Hobart Muir, and Rozella B. Smith. Early foundations of Mexican herpetology: An annotated and indexed bibliography of the herpetological publications of Alfredo Dugès, 1826-1910. University of Illinois Press, 1969.
- Bock, C. E., and Rozella B. Smith. "An analysis of Colorado Christmas counts." Am. Birds 25.6 (1971): 945–947.
- Smith, Hobart M., and Rozella B. Smith. "Synopsis of the Herpetofauna of Mexico, vol. 1, Analysis of the Literature on the Mexican Axolotl." Augusta: Lundberg Press (1971).
- Smith, Hobart M., and Rozella B. Smith. "Chresonymy ex synonymy." Systematic Biology 21.4 (1972): 445-445.
- Smith, Hobart M., Rozella B. Smith, and H. Lewis Sawin. "The generic name of the neotropical semiterrestrial emydine turtles." Transactions of the Kansas Academy of Science (1903) (1974): 211–218.
- Smith, Hobart M., Rozella B. Smith, and H. Lewis Sawin. "A summary of snake classification (Reptilia, Serpentes)." Journal of Herpetology (1977): 115–121.
- Pérez-Higareda, Gonzalo, Hobart M. Smith, and Rozella B. Smith. "A new species of Tantilla from Veracruz, Mexico." Journal of herpetology 19.2 (1985): 290–292.
- Southwick, Charles H., and Rozella B. Smith. "The growth of primate field studies." Comparative primate biology 2.pt A (1986): 73–91.
