= Linton Satterthwaite =

Mayan archaeologist (1897-1978)

Linton Satterthwaite Jr. (1897–1978) was a Maya archaeologist and epigrapher and is primarily associated with the University Museum at the University of Pennsylvania. He is well known for his works at Caracol, Piedras Negras, Cahal Pech and Benque Viejo (Xunantunich).

== Early life and training ==
Satterthwaite was born in Trenton, New Jersey and had a public school education in the area. After graduating from Trenton High School, Satterthwaite joined the military and served as a cadet and flying officer for the Royal Navy Air Force during World War I. Afterwards, he decided to attend Yale University for his B.A. and worked as a reporter from 1929 to 1931. He participated as an archaeological assistant in excavations in Texas, West Virginia, and Guatemala. Satterthwaite was awarded his Ph.D. in Anthropology in 1943.

== Piedras Negras ==
In 1932, Linton Satterthwaite was named assistant director for the excavations at Piedras Negras. In 1933, J. Alden Mason left his position as field director at Piedras Negras, and the title was then given to Satterthwaite until 1939.

The focus of the expeditions at Piedras Negras was to answer archaeological questions such as establishing building sequences, stratigraphy, and uncovering architectural remains. This was a stark difference from that of Mason, who focused on monumental sculptures. Acting as director, Satterthwaite was able to excavate eleven temples, seventeen palaces, two ballcourts and multiple sweatbaths.

During his time at Piedras Negras, Satterthwaite was very well known for using a diligent and systematic approach in identifying building function. Satterthwaite also mapped many small buildings, setting a standard used by Mayanists to come (Houston et al. 1998). Because of Satterthwaite’s legal background, he was also able to effectively create detailed isometrics that conveyed the substance of excavations and define terms and labels.

Although many publications on Piedras Negras came out during his time there, Satterthwaite was still never able to finish all of the reports that he intended to. One publication that was completed the book Piedras Negras Archaeology, 1931-1939.

Among the archaeologists who worked with Satterthwaite at Piedras Negras was Mary Butler Lewis, a leading expert on Mesoamerican ceramics, and the first woman to receive a PhD in Anthropology from Penn.

== Caracol, Belize ==
Initial discovery and research of Caracol, Belize occurred in 1938, when Rosa Mai discovered the ancient ruins and A.H. Anderson did initial research, discovering 8 pieces of stelae in the process.

From 1950 to 1958, Linton Satterthwaite directed three sessions of archaeological work at Caracol, Belize. His concentration at this site was on hieroglyphs and chronology. During this time, in 1955 Linton Satterthwaite became curator of the American Section of the University Museum and Professor of Anthropology at the University of Pennsylvania. He created a systematic locational guide and inventory of the artifacts from the New World.

During the three seasons in the 1950s at Caracol, Satterthwaite was able to find twenty-six early classic vessels, nine late classic vessels, but as previously stated most of his time was dedicated to the monumental sculptures. In total, Satterthwaite found twenty stelae and nineteen altars. These monuments were made into casts, photographed, sketched and made into quarter-scale blowups. Much of his work at Caracol was published in the book The Monuments and Inscriptions of Caracol, Belize, which is co-authored with Carl P. Beetz. In this book, Satterthwaite and Beetz describe the stelae and altars, from their exact context in the ground to interpretations of the hieroglyphs recorded on these monuments.

== Cahal Pech and Benque Viejo (Xunantunich) ==
At the same time of the Caracol investigations 2026, Satterthwaite was also conducting archaeological investigations at Cahal Pech and Benque Viejo (what is now called Xunantunich).

Satterthwaite worked at these sites for two seasons beginning in 1950. It was considered a “housemound project”, and Satterthwaite was able to investigate seventeen structures and five stelae.

== Tikal ==
Linton Satterthwaite also served as the project’s epigrapher at Tikal, Guatemala. His heavy interest in Maya chronology and monuments can also be seen in the article entitled, "New Radiocarbon Dates and the Maya Correlation Problem," which he co-authored with radiocarbon-dating specialist Elizabeth K. Ralph, and in which they discuss dates of lintel and vault beams from Tikal.

== Retirement and death ==
In 1969, Linton Satterthwaite retired as curator for the University Museum and professor at Penn. He did however continue his work on the data at Caracol, Belize and Xunantunich. He died on March 11, 1978.

== Legacy ==
Satterthwaite was able to jumpstart careers in Maya studies, specifically with Tatiana Proskouriakoff, who started her archaeological career in Piedras Negras, Guatemala during Satterthwaite’s tenure there. In the preface of The Monuments and Inscriptions of Caracol, Belize, William Coe and Christopher Jones praise Satterthwaite as a man of "limitless generosity, and, more germanely, his ingrained need to recognize each man's contribution".

Linton Satterthwaite is commemorated in the scientific name of a species of Central American snake, Tantillita lintoni.

== See also ==
- Maya Script
- Mayan Languages
- Mesoamerican chronology
- Pre-Columbian Belize
