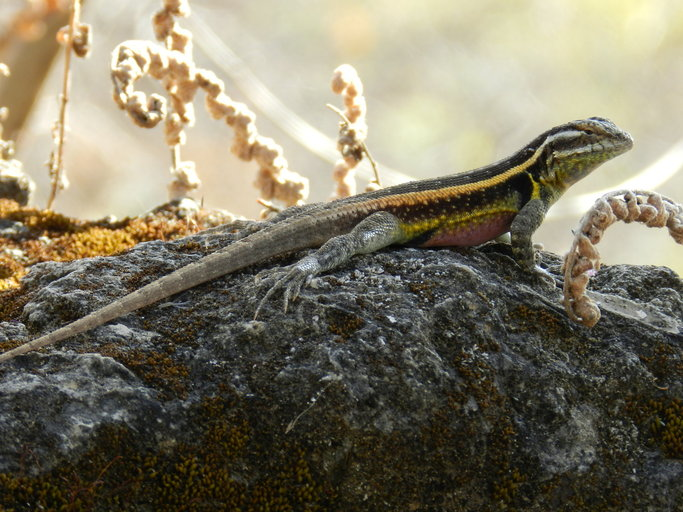

Conservation status
- Least Concern (IUCN 3.1)

Scientific classification
- Domain: Eukaryota
- Kingdom: Animalia
- Phylum: Chordata
- Class: Reptilia
- Order: Squamata
- Suborder: Iguania
- Family: Phrynosomatidae
- Genus: Sceloporus
- Species: S. smithi

Binomial name
- Sceloporus smithi Hartweg & J.A. Oliver 1937

= Sceloporus smithi =

Species of lizard

Sceloporus smithi, Smith's rosebelly lizard, is a species of lizard in the family Phrynosomatidae. It is endemic to Mexico.
