= Hobart Muir Smith =

American herpetologist

Hobart Muir Smith, born Frederick William Stouffer (September 26, 1912 – March 4, 2013), was an American herpetologist. He is credited with describing more than 100 new species of American reptiles and amphibians. In addition, he has been honored by having at least six species named after him, including the southwestern blackhead snake (Tantilla hobartsmithi), Smith's earth snake (Uropeltis grandis), Smith's arboreal alligator lizard (Abronia smithi), Hobart's anadia (Anadia hobarti), Hobart Smith's anole (Anolis hobartsmithi), and Smith's rose-bellied lizard (Sceloporus smithi). At 100 years of age, Smith continued to be an active and productive herpetologist. Although he published on a wide range of herpetological subjects, his main focus throughout his career was on the amphibians and reptiles of Mexico, including taxonomy, bibliographies, and history. Having published more than 1,600 manuscripts, he surpassed all contemporaries and remains the most published herpetologist of all time.

== Early life and education ==
Smith was born in Stanwood, Iowa on September 26, 1912. Smith attained his Bachelor of Science in 1932 from Kansas State University, under Howard K. Gloyd, and attained his masters (in 1933) and doctorate (in 1936) at the University of Kansas under Dr. Edward Harrison Taylor, where his thesis was a revision of the lizard genus Sceloporus. He also participated in several specimen collecting trips to Mexico.

== Career ==
In 1936-37 Smith was awarded a National Research Council Fellowship at the University of Michigan, where he wrote The Mexican and Central American Lizards of the Genus Sceloporus (1939). In 1937 he worked for both the Chicago Academy of Sciences and the Field Museum of Natural History. He was given a fellowship by the Smithsonian Institution to collect specimens in Mexico, and collected over 20,000. From 1941 until 1945 he was a zoology professor at the University of Rochester, in New York. In 1945 he returned to the University of Kansas as an associate professor and wrote the Handbook of Lizards, Lizards of the US and of Canada. In 1946 he moved to Texas and became an associate professor of wildlife management at Texas A&M University and wrote Checklist and key to snakes of Mexico and Checklist and key to amphibians of Mexico with Taylor. From 1947 until 1968 he was a professor of zoology at the University of Illinois at Urbana-Champaign where correspondence with Stephen Smith can be found in the University Archives. He retired in 1968 and moved to Boulder, Colorado, where he became a professor of biology at the University of Colorado. In 1972 he became chairman of, what is now, the Department of Ecology and Evolutionary Biology. In 1983 he retired, becoming a professor emeritus and continued his personal research with over 1,600 publications, including 29 books.

== Personal life ==
Born Frederick William Stouffer in 1912, he was adopted in 1916 by Charles and Frances Smith, farmers. In 1938 he married Rozella Pearl Beverly Blood (who became Rozella Pearl Beverly Blood Smith, 1911–1987), who helped him publish his extensive collection of herpetological notes. In 1942 he named a species of lizard in honor of her, Celestus rozellae. A subspecies of snake, Tantillita lintoni rozellae, is also named in honor of her.

== Selected bibliography ==
- Smith, H. M. (1939). The Mexican and Central American Lizards of the Genus Sceloporus. Zoological Series, Field Museum of Natural History Vol. 26, No.1: 429 pp.
- Smith, H. M., and E. H. Taylor (1945). An Annotated Checklist and Key to the Snakes of Mexico. United States National Museum, Bulletin 187: 1–239.
- Smith, H. M. (1946). Handbook of Lizards: Lizards of the United States and of Canada. Comstock Publishing Associates, Cornell University Press. Ithaca, New York. xxi, 557 pp. 1995 pbk.)
- Smith, H. M., and E. H. Taylor (1948). An Annotated Checklist and Key to the Amphibia of Mexico. United States National Museum, Bulletin 194: 1–118.
- Handbook of Amphibians and Reptiles of Kansas (1950).
- Smith, H. M., and E. H. Taylor (1950). An Annotated Checklist and Key to the Reptiles of Mexico Exclusive of Snakes. United States National Museum, Bulletin 199: 1–253.
- Reptiles and Amphibians: A Guide to Familiar American Species with Herbert S. Zim (1953, 1956).
- Reptiles and Amphibians - A Guide to Familiar American Species (1958).
- Poisonous Amphibians and Reptiles (1959).
- Smith, H. M. (1961). Evolution of Chordate Structure. Holt, Rinehart and Winston. 529 pp.
- Snakes as Pets (1965).
- Smith, H. M., and Rozella B. Smith (1969). Early Foundations of Mexican Herpetology: An annotated and indexed bibliography of the herpetological publications of Alfredo Dugés, 1826-1910. University of Illinois Press. Urbana, Illinois. 85 pp.
- Smith, H. M. and Rozella B. Smith (1971). Synopsis of the Herpetofauna of Mexico, Vol. I. Analysis of the Literature on the Mexican Axolotl. Eric Lundburg. Augusta, West Virginia. xxvii, 245 pp.
- Smith, H. M., and Rozella B. Smith (1973). Synopsis of the Herpetofauna of Mexico, Vol. II. Analysis of the Literature Exclusive of the Mexican Axolotl. Eric Lundburg. Augusta, West Virginia. xxxiii, 367 pp.
- Smith, H. M., and Rozella B. Smith (1976). Synopsis of the Herpetofauna of Mexico, Vol. III, Source Analysis and Index for Mexican Reptiles. John Johnson, North Bennington, Vermont. 997 pp.
- Smith, H. M., and Rozella B. Smith (1976). Synopsis of the Herpetofauna of Mexico, Vol. IV. Source Analysis and Index for Mexican Amphibians. John Johnson. North Bennington, Vermont. 254 pp. ISBN 0-910914-09-5.
- Smith, H. M., and Rozella B. Smith (1977). Synopsis of the Herpetofauna of Mexico, Vol. V. Guide to Mexican Amphisbaenians and Crocodilians, Bibliographic Addenda II. John Johnson. North Bennington, Vermont. 187 pp. ISBN 0-910914-09-5.
- Smith, H. M., and Rozella B. Smith (1979). Synopsis of the Herpetofauna of Mexico, Vol. VI, Guide to Mexican Turtles, Bibliographic Addendum III. John Johnson, North Bennington, Vermont. xviii, 1044 pp. ISBN 0-910914-11-7.
- Smith, H. M., and Rozella B. Smith (1993). Synopsis of the Herpetofauna of Mexico, Vol. VII, Bibliographic Addendum IV and Index to Bibliographic Addenda II-IV 1979-1991. University Press of Colorado, Niwot, Colorado. ix, 1082 pp. ISBN 0-87081-284-X.
- Smith, H. M., and Edmund D. Brodie Jr. (1978). Reptiles of North America: A Guide to Field Identification. Golden Press. Western Publishing Co. Inc. Racine, Wisconsin. 240 pp. ISBN 0-307-47009-1.
- Smith, Hobart M., and David Chiszar (1996). Species-Group Taxa of the False Coral Snake Genus Pliocercus. Ramus Publishing. 112 pp. ISBN 0965253503.
- Lemos Espinal, Julio A., and Hobart M. Smith (2007). Amphibians and Reptiles of the State of Chihuahua, Mexico. Universidad Nacional Autónoma de México. México, D.F. xiii + 613 pp. ISBN 970-9000-41-1.
